= Balthazar Ntivuguruzwa =

Rwandan prelate

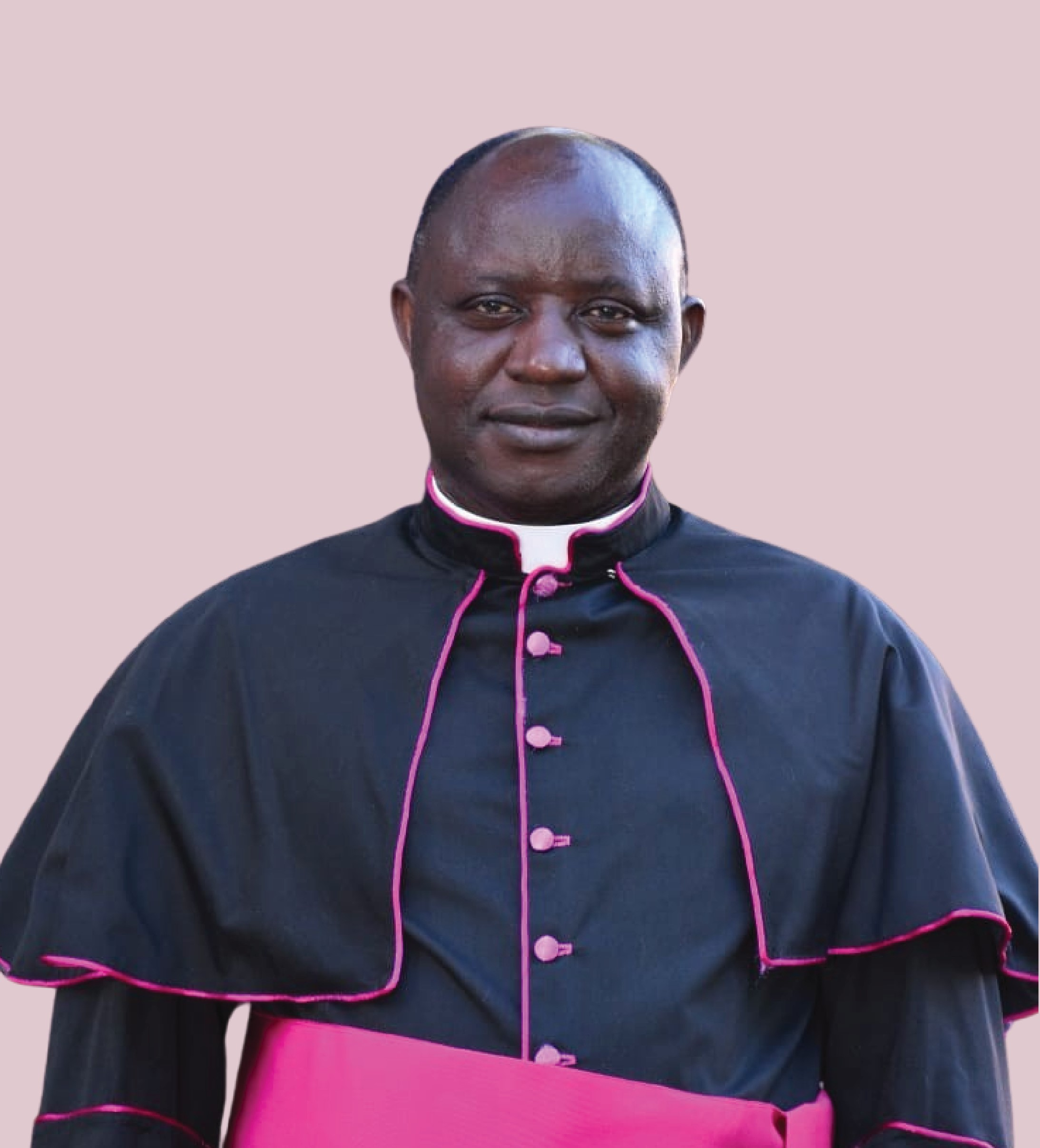
- Church: Roman Catholic Church
- Diocese: Kabgayi
- Elected: 2 May 2023
- Installed: 17 June 2023
- Predecessor: Smaragde Mbonyintege
- Previous posts: Vice Chancellor, Institut Catholique de Kabgayi

Orders
- Ordination: 18 Jan 1997 by Anastase Mutabazi
- Consecration: 17 June 2023 by Antoine Kambanda

Personal details
- Born: 15 September 1967 (age 59) Muhanga, Rwanda
- Denomination: Catholic
- Residence: Kabgayi
- Education: Université catholique de Louvain
- Motto: Orate in Veritate; (Pray in Truth)

Styles of Balthazar Ntivuguruzwa
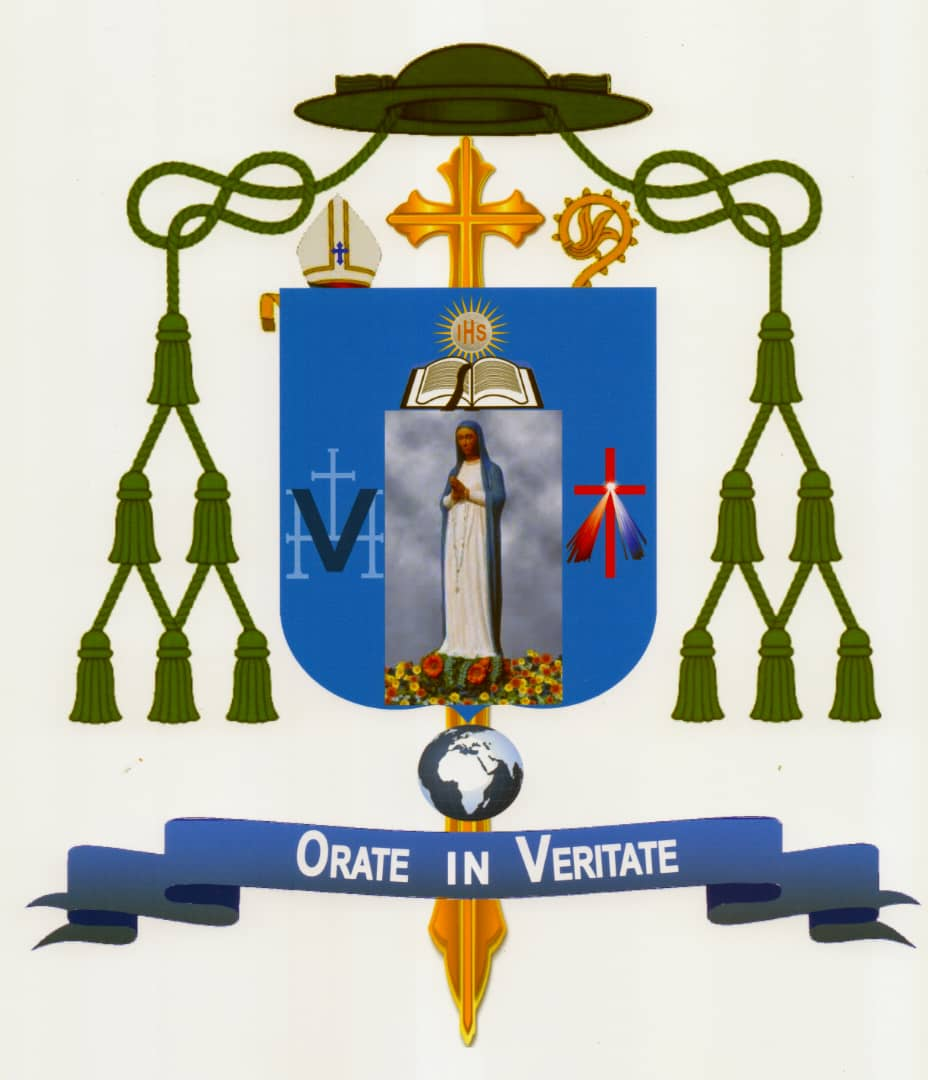
- Reference style: The Most Reverend
- Spoken style: Monsignor

Balthazar Ntivuguruzwa (born September 15, 1967) is a Rwandan prelate, educator and bishop of the Roman Catholic Church. Since June 2023, he has served as the Bishop of Diocese of Kabgayi. Previously, he served as the Vice Chancellor of Institut Catholique de Kabgayi and the dean of studies at Nyakibanda Major Seminary.

== Early life and education ==
Ntivuguruzwa was born on September 15, 1967, in Kabgayi, Rwanda. He studied at the Saint Leon Minor Seminary of Kabgayi from 1982 to 1988. After the Minor Seminary, he studied philosophy at the seminary in Kabgayi and then studied theology at the Université Catholique du Congo in Kinshassa, DRC. On January 18, 1997, he was ordained Priest of the Diocese of Kabgayi.

From 2003, Ntivuguruzwa studied at the Catholic University of Louvain and received his PhD in 2009. His Thesis, "Magisterium and moral life of the faithful: A rereading of the Catechism of the Catholic Church" was supervised by Henri Wattiaux.

== Career ==
Ntivuguruzwa was appointed vice rector and teacher at the Saint Leon Minor Seminary of Kabgayi until 2000. Between 2000 and 2003, he was a Secretary of Bishop Anasthase Mutabazi. During his time doing PhD in Louvain, he worked in pastoral care in the Archdiocese of Mechelen-Brussels.

After completing his doctorate studies, Ntivuguruzwa returned to Rwanda. From 2010 to 2017, he worked at Nyakibanda Major Seminary where he was a professor and dean of studies. Since 2017 up to his consecration, he was the Vice Chancellor of Catholic Institute in Kabgayi, an institute of higher learning of the Kabgayi Diocese.

== Bishop of Kabgayi Diocese ==
On May 2, 2023, Pope Francis elected Ntivuguruzwa to replace Bishop Smaradge Mbonyintege as the Bishop of Catholic Diocese of Kabgayi. Ntivuguruzwa was consecrated on 17 June 2023 by a congregation led by Antoine Kambanda.

Ntivuguruzwa is the seventh Bishop of Kabgayi Diocese. His Motto is "Orate in Veritate" (English: Pray in Truth).
