= List of participants at the Fourteenth Ordinary General Assembly of the Synod of Bishops =

The Fourteenth Ordinary General Assembly of the Synod of Bishops will contain "a great part of the episcopate," with many participating bishops being elected by their peers. The Synod fathers include

== List of synod fathers ==
Role	Names
President	Francis, Supreme Pontiff
Delegate Presidents	Cardinals Andre Vingt-Trois, Luis Antonio Tagle, Raymundo Damasceno Assis, and Wilfrid F. Napier
General Reporter	Cardinal Péter Erdő
General Secretary	Cardinal Lorenzo Baldisseri
Special Secretary	Archbishop Bruno Forte

== From the Eastern Catholic Churches ==
=== Synod of the Coptic Catholic Church ===
ex officio: Patriarch Ibrahim Isaac Sidrak, Patriarch of Alexandria of the Copts, Head of the Synod of the Coptic Catholic Church.

=== Synod of the Greek-Melkite Catholic ===
ex officio: Patriarch Gregory III Laham, B.S., Patriarch of Antioch of the Greek-Melkites, Head of the Synod of the Greek-Melkite Catholic.

ex electione: Archbishop George Bacouni, Archbishop of Akka, Acre, Ptolemais of the Greek-Melkites.

=== Synod of the Syriac Catholic Church ===
ex officio: Patriarch Ignatius Joseph III Yonan, Patriarch of Antioch of the Syrians, Head of the Synod of the Syriac Catholic Church.

=== Synod of the Maronite Church ===
ex officio: Patriarch Bechara Boutros al-Rahi, OMM, Patriarch of Antioch of the Maronites, Head of the Synod of the Maronite Church.

ex electione: Bishop Antoine Nabil Andari, Titular Bishop of Tarsus of the Maronites, Auxiliary and Syncellus of Joubbé, Sarba and Jounieh of the Maronites, President of the Episcopal Commission for the Family and Life.

Bishop Antoine Tarabay, OLM, Bishop of Saint Maron of Sydney of the Maronites.

=== Synod of the Chaldean Church ===
ex officio: Patriarch Louis Raphael I Sako, Patriarch of Babylon of the Chaldeans, Head of the Synod of the Chaldean Church.

=== Synod of the Armenian Catholic Church ===
ex officio: Patriarch Krikor Bedros XX Gabroyan, Patriarch of Cilicia of the Armenians, Head of the Synod of the Armenian Catholic Church.

=== Synod of the Ukrainian Greek Catholic Church ===
ex officio: Major Archbishop Sviatoslav Shevchuk, Major Archbishop of Kyiv-Haly, Head of the Synod of the Ukrainian Greek Catholic Church.

ex electione: Bishop Hlib Lonchyna, Bishop of the Holy Family of London the Ukrainians Byzantines.

Bishop Borys Gudziak, Bishop of Saint Vladimir-Le-Grand de Paris of the Ukrainians Byzantines.

=== Synod of the Syro-Malabar ===
ex officio: Cardinal, Major Archbishop George Alencherry, Major Archbishop of Ernakulam-Angamaly of the Syro-Malabar, President of the Synod of the Syro-Malabar Church.

ex electione: Bishop Joseph Kallarangatt, Bishop of Palai of the Syro-Malabar.

Archbishop Andrews Thazhath, Archbishop of Trichur of Syro-Malabar.

=== Synod of the Syro-Malankara ===
ex officio: Cardinal, Major Archbishop Baselios Cleemis, Major Archbishop of Trivandrum of the Syro-Malankars, Head of the Synod of the Syro-Malankara.

=== Synod of the Romanian Church ===
ex officio: Bishop Mihai Frățilă, Bishop of St. Basil the Great in Bucharest of the Romanians.

=== Council of the Ethiopian Church ===
ex officio: Cardinal, Archbishop Berhaneyesus Demerew Souraphiel, CM, President of the Episcopal Conference, Archbishop of Addis Ababa, President of the Council of the Ethiopian Church.

=== Council of the Ruthenian Church, U.S.A. ===
ex officio: Archbishop William C. Skurla, Metropolitan Archbishop of Pittsburgh of Byzantines, President of the Council of the Ruthenian Church.

=== Church Council Slovak ===
ex officio: Archbishop Ján Babjak, SI, Metropolitan Archbishop of Presov for Catholics of Byzantine Rite, President of Council of Slovakia Church.

=== Church Council Eritrea ===
ex officio: Archbishop Menghesteab Tesfamariam MCCJ, Metropolitan Archbishop of Asmara, President of the Council of the Church Eritrea.

=== Council of the Hungarian Church ===
ex officio: Archbishop Péter Fülöp Kocsis, Metropolitan Archbishop of Hajdúdorog for Catholics of Byzantine Rite, President of Council of the Hungarian Church.

== Elected by Episcopal Conferences ==
=== Africa ===
==== North Africa (C.E.R.N.A.) ====
Member:Bishop Jean-Paul Vesco, OP, Bishop of Oran (Algeria)

==== Angola and Sao Tome ====
Member: Bishop Emílio Sumbelelo, Bishop of Uíje (Angola)

==== Benin ====
Member: Bishop Eugène Cyrille Houndékon, Bishop of Abomey, Vice President of the Episcopal Conference

==== Botswana, South Africa And Swaziland ====
Members: Archbishop Stephen Brislin, Archbishop of Cape Town, Kaapstad, President of the Episcopal Conference (South Africa)

Bishop Zolile Peter Mpambani, SCI, Bishop of Kokstad (South Africa)

==== Burkina Faso And Niger ====
Member: Bishop Joseph Sama, Bishop of Nouna (Burkina Faso)

==== Burundi ====
Member: Bishop Gervais Bashimiyubusa, of Ngozi, president of the Episcopal Conference.

Substitute: Bishop Joachim Ntahondereye of Muyinga.

==== Cameroon ====
Members: ArchbishopJoseph Atanga, SI, Archbishop of Bertoua

ArchbishopSamuel Kleda, Archbishop of Douala, President of the Episcopal Conference

==== Central African Republic ====
Member: Bishop Cyr-Nestor Yapaupa, Bishop of Alindao

==== Chad ====
Member: Bishop Henri Coudray, SI, Titular Bishop of Silli, Apostolic Vicar of Mongo

==== Congo (Rep. of) ====
Member: Bishop Urbain Ngassongo, Bishop of Gamboma, President of the Episcopal Commission for Family Ministry

==== Congo (Democratic Rep. of) ====
Members: Bishop Nicolas Djomo Lola, Bishop of Tshumbe

Bishop Philibert Tembo Nlandu, CICM, Bishop of Budjala

==== Ethiopia and Eritrea ====
Member: Bishop Tsegaye Keneni Derera, apostolic vicar of Soddo, Ethiopia.

Substitute: Bishop Markos Gebremedhin, C.M., apostolic vicar of Jimma-Bonga, Ethiopia.

==== Gabon ====
Member: Bishop Mathieu Madega Lebouakehan, Bishop of Mouila, President of the Episcopal Conference

==== Gambia and Sierra Leone ====
Member: Bishop Charles Allieu Matthew Campbell, Bishop of Bo (Sierra Leone)

==== Ghana ====
Member: Archbishop Charles Gabriel Palmer- Buckle, of Accra.

Substitute: Bishop Anthony Kwami Adanuty of Keta-katsi.

==== Guinea ====
Member: Bishop Raphael Balla Guilavogui, Bishop of N'Zérékoré

==== Equatorial Guinea ====
Member: Bishop Juan Matogo Oyana, CMF, Bishop of Bata3

==== Indian Ocean (C.E.D.O.I.) ====
Member: Bishop Maurice Piat CSSp., Bishop of Port-Louis (Mauritius), President of the Episcopal Conference

==== Ivory Coast ====
Member: Bishop Ignace Bessi Dogb, Bishop of Katiola, President of the Episcopal Commission Nationale de l'Apostolat des laïcs

==== Kenya ====
Members: Cardinal John Njue, Archbishop of Nairobi, president of the Episcopal Conference.

Bishop James Maria Wainaina Kungu of Muranga.

Substitute: Bishop Emanuel Barbara, O.F.M. Cap. of Malindi.

==== Lesotho ====
Member: Archbishop Gerard Tlali Lerotholi, OMI, Archbishop of Maseru, President of the Episcopal Conference

==== Liberia ====
Member:Bishop Anthony Fallah Borwah, Bishop of Gbarnga

==== Madagascar ====
Member: Bishop Desire Tsarahazana of Toamasina, president of the Episcopal Conference.

Substitute: Bishop Jean de Dieu Raoelison, auxiliary of Antananarivo.MALAWI

==== Malawi ====
Member: Archbishop Thomas Luke Msusa, SMM, Archbishop of Blantyre, President of the Episcopal Conference

==== Mali ====
Member: Bishop Jonas Dembele, Bishop of Kayes

==== Mozambique ====
Member: Archbishop Francisco Chimoio, O.F.M. Cap., Archbishop of Maputo, President of the Episcopal Commission for the Family

==== Namibia ====
Member: Bishop Phillip Pöllitzer, OMI, Bishop of Keetmanshoop

==== Nigeria ====
Members: Archbishop Matthew Man-oso Ndagoso, Archbishop of Kaduna

Bishop Camillus Archibong Etokudoh Umoh, Bishop of Ikot Ekpene

Bishop Jude Ayodeji Arogundade, Bishop of Ondo

==== Rwanda ====
Member: Bishop Antoine Kambanda of Kibungo.

Substitute: Bishop Smaragde Mbonyintege of Kabgayi, president of the Episcopal Conference.

==== Senegal, Mauritania, Capo Verde and Guinea-Bissau ====
Member: Archbishop Benjamin Ndiaye, Archbishop of Dakar (Senegal), President of the Episcopal Conference

==== Sudan ====
Member: Archbishop Paulino Lukudu Loro MCCJ, Archbishop of Juba

==== Tanzania ====
Members: Bishop Tarcisius Ngalalekumtwa, Bishop of Iringa, President of the Episcopal Conference

Bishop Renatus Leonard Nkwande, Bishop of Bunda

==== Togo ====
Member: Bishop Jacques Danga Longa, Bishop of Kara

==== Uganda ====
Members: Archbishop John Baptist Odama, Archbishop of Gulu, President of the Episcopal Conference

Bishop Joseph Anthony Zziwa, Bishop of Kiyinda-Mityana, Vice President of the Episcopal Conference

==== Zambia ====
Member: Bishop Benjamin S. Phiri, Titular Bishop of Nachingwea, Auxiliary of Chipata

==== Zimbabwe ====
Member: Bishop Xavier Munyongani Xavier Johnsai MUNYONGANI, Bishop of Gweru

=== Americas ===
==== Argentina ====
Members: Bishop Pedro María Laxague, auxiliary of Bahia Blanca.

Archbishop Jose Maria Arancedo of Santa Fe de la Vera Cruz, president of the Episcopal Conference.

Cardinal Mario Aurelio Poli, archbishop of Buenos Aires.

Substitutes: Archbishop Andres Stanovnik, O.F.M. Cap. of Corrientes.

Archbishop Hector Ruben Aguer of La Plata. BOLIVIA

His Ecc.za Rev.ma Mgr. Braulio SÁEZ García, OCD, Titular Bishop of Satin, auxiliary of Santa Cruz de la Sierra

His Ecc.za Rev.ma Mons. Krzysztof Janusz BIAASIK WAWROWSKA, SVD, Bishop of Oruro

==== Brazil ====
Members: Archbishop Sérgio da Rocha, Archbishop of Brasilia, President of the Episcopal Conference

Bishop João Carlos Petrini, Bishop of Camaçari

Archbishop Geraldo Lyrio Rocha, Archbishop of Mariana

Cardinal Archbishop Odilo Pedro Scherer, Archbishop of São Paulo

==== Canada ====
Members: Archbishop Paul-André Durocher, Archbishop of Gatineau, President of the Episcopal Conference

Bishop Noël Simard, Bishop of Valleyfield

Archbishop Thomas Christopher Collins, Archbishop of Toronto

Archbishop Richard William Smith, Archbishop of Edmonton

==== Chile ====
Members: Bishop Bernardo Miguel Bastres Florence, S.D.B. of Punta Arenas.

Cardinal Ricardo Ezzati Andrello, S.D.B., archbishop of Santiago de Chile, president of the Episcopal Conference.

Substitute: Bishop Cristian Contreras Villarroel of Melipilla, general secretary of the Episcopal Conference.

==== Colombia ====
Members: Bishop Pablo Emir Salas Anteliz, Bishop of Armenia

Cardinal Archbishop Rubén Salazar Gómez, Archbishop of Bogota, President of the Latin American Episcopal Council (CELAM.)

Archbishop Oscar Urbina Ortega, Archbishop of Villavicencio

==== Costa Rica ====
Member: Bishop José Francisco Ulloa Rojas, Bishop of Cartago, President of the Episcopal Comisión para la Pastoral Familiar

==== Cuba ====
Member: Bishop Marcelo Arturo Gonzalez Amador of Santa Clara.

==== Dominican Republic ====
Member: Bishop Gregorio Nicanor Peña Rodríguez, Bishop of Nuestra Señora de la Altagracia en Higüey, President of the Episcopal Conference

==== Ecuador ====
Members: Archbishop Antonio Arregui Yarza of Guayaquil.

Archbishop Luis Gerardo Cabrera Herrera, O.F.M. of Cuenca.

Substitutes: Bishop Julio Parrilla Diaz of Riobamba.

Bishop Marcos Aurelio Perez Caicedo of Babahoyo, vice president of the Episcopal Conference.

==== El Salvador ====
Member: Bishop Constantino Barrera Morales, Bishop of Sonsonate

==== Guatemala ====
Member: Bishop Rodolfo Valenzuela Núñez, Bishop of Vera Paz, Coban, President of the Episcopal Conference

==== Haiti ====
Member: Bishop Yves-Marie Péan, CSC, Bishop of Gonaïves

==== Honduras ====
Member: Bishop Luis Sole Fa, C.M. of Trujillo.

Substitute: Bishop Angel Garachana Perez, C.M.F. of San Pedro Sula.

==== Mexico ====
Members: Bishop Rodrigo Aguilar Martinez of Tehuacan.

Cardinal Norberto Rivera Carrera, archbishop of Mexico.

Bishop Alfonso Gerardo Miranda Guardiola, auxiliary of Monterrey.

Cardinal Francisco Robles Ortega, archbishop of Guadalajara, president of the Episcopal Conference.

Substitutes: Bishop Jose Francisco Gonzalez Gonzalez of Campeche.

==== Nicaragua ====
Member: Bishop César Bosco Vivas Robelo, Bishop of León en Nicaragua

==== Panama ====
Member: Bishop Aníbal Saldaña Santamaría, OAR, Bishop Prelate of Bocas del Toro

==== Paraguay ====
Member: Bishop Miguel Ángel Cabello Almada, Bishop of Concepción en Paraguay

==== Peru ====
Member: Archbishop Salvador Piñeiro, Archbishop of Ayacucho or Huamanga, President of the Episcopal Conference

Archbishop Héctor Miguel Cabrejos Vidarte, OFM, Archbishop of Trujillo

==== Puerto Rico ====
Member: Archbishop Roberto González Nieves, OFM, Archbishop of San Juan de Puerto Rico, President of the Episcopal Conference

==== United States ====
Members: Archbishop Joseph Edward Kurtz of Louisville, president of the Episcopal Conference.

Archbishop Charles Joseph Chaput, O.F.M. Cap. of Philadelphia.

Cardinal Daniel N. Di Nardo, archbishop of Galveston-Houston, vice president of the Episcopal Conference.

Archbishop José Horacio Gómez of Los Angeles.

Substitutes: Archbishop Blase J. Cupich of Chicago.

Archbishop Salvatore Joseph Cordileone of San Francisco.

==== Uruguay ====
Member: Bishop Jaime Rafael Fuentes Martin of Minas.

Substitute:Bishop Rodolfo Pedro Wirz Kraemer of Maldonado-Punta del Este, president of the Episcopal Conference.

==== Venezuela ====
Members: Cardinal Archbishop Jorge Urosa, Archbishop of Caracas, Santiago de Venezuela

Archbishop Diego Padrón, Archbishop of Cumana, President of the Episcopal Conference

==== West Indies ====
Member: Bishop Francis Dean Alleyne OSB, Bishop of Georgetown

=== Asia ===
==== Arab Countries ====
Member: Patriarch Fouad Twal, Patriarch of Jerusalem of the Latins (Jerusalem), President of the Episcopal Conference

==== Bangladesh ====
Member: Bishop Paul Ponen Kubi, CSC, Bishop of Mymensingh, President of the Episcopal Family Life Commission

==== Cambodia and Laos ====
Member: Bishop Louis-Marie Ling Mangkhanekhoun, Titular Bishop of Acque new Proconsulari, Apostolic Vicar of Pakse (Laos)

==== China ====
Member: Bishop John Baptist Lee Keh-mien, Bishop of Hsinchu

==== East Timor ====
Member: Bishop Basilio do Nascimento, Bishop of Baucau, President of the Episcopal Conference

==== India (C.C.B.I.) ====
Members: Cardinal Archbishop Oswald Gracias, Archbishop of Bombay, President of the Episcopal Conference

Patriarch Filipe Neri Ferrão, Archbishop of Goa and Damao and Patriarch of the East Indies

Bishop Selvister Ponnumuthan, Bishop of Punalur

Archbishop Dominic Jala, SDB, Archbishop of Shillong

==== Indonesia ====
Members: Archbishop Ignatius Suharyo Hardjoatmodjo, Archbishop of Jakarta, President of the Episcopal Conference

Bishop Franciscus Kopong Kung, Bishop of Larantuka

==== Iran ====
Member: Ramzi Garmou, Archbishop of Tehran of the Chaldeans, Patriarchal Administrator of Ahwaz the Chaldeans, President of the Episcopal Conference

==== Japan ====
Member: Archbishop Joseph Mitsuaki Takami, PSS, Archbishop of Nagasaki, Vice President of the Episcopal Conference

==== Korea ====
Member: Bishop Peter Woo-il Kang, Bishop of Cheju

==== Kazakhstan ====
Member: Archbishop Tomasz Peta, Archbishop of Maria Santissima in Astana, President of the Episcopal Conference

==== Malaysia – Singapore – Brunei ====
Member: Archbishop John Wong Soo Kau, Archbishop of Kota Kinabalu (Malaysia)

==== Myanmar ====
Member: Cardinal Archbishop Charles Maung Bo, SDB, Archbishop of Yangon

==== Pakistan ====
Member: Bishop Joseph Arshad of Faisalabad.

Substitute: Archbishop Sebastian Francis Shaw of Lahore.

==== Philippines ====
Members: Archbishop Romulo Valles, Archbishop of Davao

Archbishop Jose Serofia Palma, Archbishop of Cebu

Bishop Gilbert A. Garcera, Bishop of Daet

==== Sri Lanka ====
Member: Bishop Harold Anthony Perera, Bishop of Kurunegala

==== Thailand ====
Member: Bishop Silvio Siripong Charatsri, Bishop of Chanthaburi

==== Vietnam ====
Members: Archbishop Paul Bui Van Doc of Thanh-Pho Ho Chi Minh, Hochiminh Ville, president of the Episcopal Conference.

Bishop Joseph Dinh Duc Dao, auxiliary of Xuan Loc.

Substitute: Bishop Pierre Nguyen Van Kham of My Tho.

=== Europe ===
==== Albania ====
Member: Bishop George Frendo, O.P. Auxiliary of Tirane-Durrës.

Substitute: Bishop Ottavio Vitale, R.C.J. of Lezhe, Lesh.

==== Austria ====
Member: Bishop Benno Elbs of Feldkirch.

Substitute: Bishop Kalus Kung of Sankt Polten.

==== Belarus ====
Member: Archbishop Tadeusz Kondrusiewicz of Minsk-Mohilev, President of the Episcopal Conference

==== Belgium ====
Member: Bishop Johan Bonny, Bishop of Antwerp, Antwerp

==== Bosnia and Herzegovina ====
Member: Bishop Tomo Vuksic, military ordinary of Bosnia and Herzegovina.

Substitute: Bishop Marko Semren, O.F.M. auxiliary of Banja Luka.

==== Bulgaria ====
Member: Bishop Gheorghi Ivanov Jovcev, Bishop of Sofia and Plovdiv

==== Croatia ====
Member: Bishop Antun Škvorčević, Bishop of Požega

==== Czech Republic ====
Member: Bishop Jan Vokál, Bishop of Hradec Kralove

==== Episcopal Conference of the International SS. Cyril and Methodius ====
Member: Bishop László Német, SVD, Bishop of Zrenjanin (Serbia)

==== France ====
Members: Archbishop Georges Pontier of Marseille, president of the Episcopal Conference.

Cardinal Andre Vingt-Trois, archbishop Paris.

Bishop Jean-Luc Brunin of Le Havre.

Bishop Jean-Paul James of Nantes.

Substitutes: Bishop Olivier de Germay of Ajaccio.

Bishop Bruno Feillet, auxiliary of Reims.

==== Germany ====
Members: Cardinal Archbishop Reinhard Marx, Archbishop of Munich and Freising

Archbishop Heiner Koch, Archbishop of Berlin

Bishop Franz-Josef Hermann Bode, Bishop of Osnabrück

==== Greece ====
Member: Bishop Fragkiskos Papamanolis, O.F.M. Cap. emeritus of Syros, president of the Episcopal Conference.

Substitute: Archbishop Nikolaos Foskolos, emeritus of Athenai.

==== Hungary ====
Bishop András Veres, Bishop of Szombathely

==== Ireland ====
Members: Archbishop Diarmuid Martin of Dublin.

Archbishop Eamon Martin of Armagh, president of the Episcopal Conference.

Substitute: Archbishop Kieran O'Reilly, S.M.A. of Cashel.

==== Italy ====
Members: Cardinal Archbishop Angelo Bagnasco, Archbishop of Genoa, President of the Episcopal Conference

Cardinal Archbishop Angelo Scola, Archbishop of Milan

Bishop Franco Giulio Brambilla, Bishop of Novara

Bishop Enrico Solmi, Bishop of Parma

==== Latvia ====
Member: Archbishop Zbigņevs Stankevičs, Archbishop of Riga

==== Lithuania ====
Member: Cardinal Audrys Jouzas Backis, archbishop emeritus of Vilnius.

Substitute: Bishop Rimantas Norvila of Vilkaviskis.

==== Malta ====
Member: Bishop Mario Grech, Bishop of Gozo, President of the Episcopal Conference

==== Netherlands ====
Member: Cardinal Willem Jacobus Eijk, archbishop of Utrecht.

Substitute: Bishop Johannes Wilhelmus Maria Liesen of Breda.

==== Poland ====
Members: Archbishop Stanisław Gądecki, Archbishop of Poznan, President of the Episcopal Conference

Archbishop Henryk Hoser, SAC, Archbishop-Bishop of Warsaw-Prague

Bishop Jan Franciszek Wątroba, Bishop of Rzeszów

==== Portugal ====
Members: Cardinal Patriarch Manuel Clemente, Patriarch of Lisbon, President of the Episcopal Conference

Bishop Antonino Eugénio Fernandes Dias, Bishop of Portalegre-Castelo Branco, President of the Episcopal Comissão do Laicado and Família

==== Romania ====
Member: Bishop Petru Gherghel, Bishop of Iași

==== Russian Federation ====
Member: Archbishop Paolo Pezzi, FSCB, Archbishop of Mother of God in Moscow, President of the Episcopal Conference

==== Scandinavia ====
Member: Bishop Teemu Sippo, SCI, Bishop of Helsinki

==== Slovakia ====
Member: Archbishop Stanislav Zvolenský, Archbishop of Bratislava, President of the Episcopal Conference

==== Slovenia ====
Member: Archbishop Stane Zore, OFM, Archbishop of Ljubljana

==== Spain ====
Members: Cardinal Ricardo Blazquez Perez, archbishop of Valladolid, president of the Episcopal Conference.

Bishop Mario Iceta Gavicagogeascoa of Bilbao.

Archbishop Carlos Osoro Sierra of Madrid.

Substitute: Bishop Juan Antonio Reig Pla of Alcala de Henares.

==== Switzerland ====
Member: Bishop Jean-Marie Lovey, CRB, Bishop of Sion

==== Turkey ====
Member: Archbishop Lévon Boghos Zékiyan, Archbishop of Istanbul

==== Ukraine ====
Member: Archbishop Mieczysław Mokrzycki, Archbishop of Lviv of the Latins, President of the Episcopal Conference

==== United Kingdom ====
===== England and Wales =====
Members: Cardinal Vincent Gerard Nichols, archbishop of Westminster, president of the Episcopal Conference.

Bishop Peter John Haworth Doyle of Northampton.

Substitute: Bishop Philip Anthony Egan of Portsmouth.

===== Scotland =====
Member: Archbishop Philip Tartaglia, Archbishop of Glasgow, President of the Episcopal Conference

=== Oceania ===
==== Australia ====
Members: Bishop Daniel Eugene Hurley of Darwin.

Archbishop Mark Benedict Coleridge of Brisbane.

Substitute: Archbishop Philip Edward Wilson of Adelaide.

==== New Zealand ====
Member: Bishop Charles Edward Drennan of Palmerston North.

Substitute: Cardinal John Dew, archbishop of Wellington, president of the Episcopal Conference.

==== Pacific (CEPAC) ====
Member: Archbishop Peter Loy Chong, Archbishop of Suva

==== Papua New Guinea and Solomon Islands ====
Member: Bishop Anton Bal, Bishop of Kundiawa, the Independent Commission for Family Life

== Elected representatives of the Union of Superiors General ==
Members: Rev. Father Adolfo Nicolás Pachon, superior general of the Jesuits

Rev. Fr. Marco Tasca, O.F.M. Conv., Minister General of the Franciscan Friars Minor Conventual

Rev. Fr. Mario Aldegani, CSI, Superior General of the Josephites of Murialdo

Rev. Richard P. Kuuia Baawobr, M.Afr., Superior General of the White Fathers

Rev. Fr. Bruno Cadoré, OP, Master General of the Dominicans

Rev. Jesús Díaz Alonso, SF, Superior General of the Sons of the Holy Family of Jesus, Mary and Joseph

Rev. Father Michael Brehl, C.SS.R., Superior General of the Redemptorists

Rev. Javier Alvarez-Ossorio, SS.CC., superior general of the Picpus Fathers

Rev. Ab. Jeremias Schröder OSB, Archabbot President of the Congregation of Sant'Ottilia

Fr. Hervé Janson, PFJ, Prior General of the Little Brothers of Jesus (Foucauld)

== Heads of the Dicasteries of the Roman Curia ==
Cardinal Pietro Parolin, Secretary of State

Cardinal Gerhard Ludwig Müller, Prefect of the Congregation for the Doctrine of the Faith

Cardinal Leonardo Sandri, Prefect of the Congregation for Oriental Churches

Cardinal Robert Sarah, Prefect of the Congregation for Divine Worship and the Discipline of the Sacraments

Cardinal Angelo Amato, SDB, Prefect of the Congregation for the Causes of Saints

Cardinal Marc Ouellet, PSS, prefect of the Congregation for Bishops

Cardinal Fernando Filoni, Prefect of the Congregation for the Evangelization of Peoples

Cardinal Beniamino Stella, Prefect of the Congregation for the Clergy

Cardinal João Braz de Aviz, Prefect of the Congregation for Institutes of Consecrated Life and Societies of Apostolic Life

Cardinal Giuseppe Versaldi, Prefect of the Congregation for Catholic Education

Cardinal Mauro Piacenza, Major Penitentiary of the Apostolic Penitentiary

Cardinal Dominique Mamberti, Prefect of the Supreme Tribunal of the Apostolic Signatura

Cardinal Stanisław Ryłko, President of the Pontifical Council for the Laity

Cardinal Kurt Koch, President of the Pontifical Council for Promoting Christian Unity

Archbishop Emeritus Vincenzo Paglia, Archbishop-Bishop Emeritus of Terni-Narni-Amelia, president of the Pontifical Council for the Family

Cardinal Peter Kodwo Appiah Turkson, President of the Pontifical Council for Justice and Peace

Cardinal Antonio Maria Vegliò, president of the Pontifical Council for the Pastoral Care of Migrants and Itinerant People

Archbishop Emeritus Zygmunt Zimowski, Archbishop-Bishop Emeritus of Radom, President of the Pontifical Council for Health Care Workers

Cardinal Francesco Coccopalmerio, president of the Pontifical Council for Legislative Texts

Cardinal Jean-Louis Tauran, President of the Pontifical Council for Interreligious Dialogue and the Camerlengo of the Holy Roman Church

Cardinal Gianfranco Ravasi, president of the Pontifical Council for Culture

Archbishop Emeritus Claudio Maria Celli, Titular Archbishop of Civitanova, President of the Pontifical Council for Social Communications

Archbishop Emeritus Salvatore Fisichella, Titular Archbishop of Voghenza, President of the Pontifical Council for Promoting the New Evangelization

Cardinal George Pell, Prefect of the Secretariat for the Economy

Cardinal Domenico Calcagno, President of the Administration of the Patrimony of the Apostolic See

== Pontifical appointments ==
Cardinal Angelo Sodano, Dean of the College of Cardinals

Cardinal Godfried Danneels, archbishop emeritus of Mechelen-Brussel (Belgium).

Cardinal Dionigi Tettamanzi, archbishop emeritus of Milan (Italy).

Cardinal Christoph Schönborn OP, archbishop of Vienna, President of the Episcopal Conference (Austria).

Cardinal Walter Kasper, president emeritus of the Pontifical Council for Promoting Christian Unity (Vatican City).

Cardinal Wilfrid Fox Napier, OFM, Archbishop of Durban (South Africa).

Cardinal Óscar Andrés Rodríguez Maradiaga, SDB, Archbishop of Tegucigalpa, President of the Episcopal Conference (Honduras).

Cardinal Péter Erdő, Archbishop of Esztergom-Budapest, President of the Episcopal Conference, President of the Council for European Episcopal Conferences (CCEE) (Hungary).

Cardinal Carlo Caffarra, Archbishop of Bologna (Italy).

Cardinal Lluís Martínez Sistach, Archbishop of Barcelona (Spain).

Cardinal Laurent Monsengwo Pasinya, Archbishop of Kinshasa (Democratic Rep. Of Congo).

Cardinal Donald Wuerl, Archbishop of Washington (USA).

Cardinal Raymundo Damasceno Assis, Archbishop of Aparecida (Brazil).

Cardinal Timothy Michael Dolan, Archbishop of New York (USA).

Cardinal Luis Antonio Tagle, Archbishop of Manila (Philippines).

Cardinal Gérald Lacroix, Archbishop of Quebec (Canada).

Cardinal Gualtiero Bassetti, Archbishop of Perugia-Città della Pieve (Italy).

Cardinal Philippe Ouédraogo, Archbishop of Ouagadougou (Burkina Faso).

Cardinal John Dew, Archbishop of Wellington, President of the Episcopal Conference (New Zealand).

Cardinal Edoardo Menichelli, Archbishop of Ancona-Osimo (Italy).

Cardinal Alberto Suárez Inda, Archbishop of Morelia (Mexico).

Cardinal Francesco Montenegro, Archbishop of Agrigento (Italy).

Cardinal Daniel Sturla SDB, Archbishop of Montevideo (Uruguay).

Cardinal José Luis Lacunza Maestrojuán, OAR, Bishop David, President of the Episcopal Conference (Panama).

Cardinal Soane Patita Paini Mafi, Bishop of Tonga, President of the Episcopal Conference (Tonga).

Cardinal Elio Sgreccia, president emeritus of the Pontifical Academy for Life (Italy).

Cardinal Giuseppe Bertello, President of the Governorate of Vatican City (Vatican City).

Archbishop Baltazar Enrique Porras Cardozo, Archbishop of Mérida (Venezuela).

Archbishop. Yannis Spiteris, O.F.M. Cap., Archbishop of Corfu, Zakynthos and Kefalonia (Greece).

Archbishop Bruno Forte, Archbishop of Chieti-Vasto (Italy).

Archbishop Laurent Ulrich, Archbishop of Lille (France).

Archbishop Carlos Aguiar Retes, Archbishop of Tlalnepantla (Mexico).

Archbishop Sergio Eduardo Castriani CSSp., Archbishop of Manaus (Brazil).

Archbishop Víctor Manuel Fernández, Titular Archbishop of Tiburnia, Rector of the Pontifical Catholic University of Argentina (Argentina).

Archbishop Blase J. Cupich, Archbishop of Chicago (USA).

Bishop George Vance Murry, S.J., Bishop of Youngstown (United States).

Bishop. Marcello Semeraro, Bishop of Albano (Italy).

Bishop Alonso Gerardo Garza Treviño, Bishop of Piedras Negras (Mexico).

Bishop Lucas Van Looy, SDB, Bishop of Ghent, (Belgium).

Msgr. Pio Vito Pinto, Dean of the Tribunal of the Roman Rota (Vatican City).

Msgr Saulo Scarabattoli, pastor of Holy Spirit Parish in Port Eburnea, Perugia (Italy).

Msgr. Roberto Rosa, parish priest of St. James the Apostle, Trieste (Italy).

Fr. François-Xavier Dumortier, S.J., rector of the Pontifical Gregorian University in Rome (Italy).

Fr. Antonio Spadaro S.J., director of the journal La Civilta Cattolica (Italy).

Fr. Manuel Jesúìus Arroba Conde, CMF, Dean of the Faculty of utrusque jure of the Pontifical Lateran University (Spain).

== Undersecretary of the Synod of Bishops ==
Member: Bishop Fabio Fabene, Titular Bishop of Aquipendium (Vatican City)

== Collaborators with the Special Secretary ==
Members: Fr. Matías Auge Benet, C.M.F., Consultor of the Congregation for Divine Worship and the Discipline of the Sacraments, (Spain)

Professor Giacomo Bertolini, associate professor of canon and ecclesiastical law at the University of Padua, Treviso Section; visiting professor at the Pontifical Urban University in Rome, (Italy)

Fr. Giuseppe Bonfrate, lecturer at the Faculty of Theology of the Pontifical Gregorian University in Rome, (Italy)

Msgr. Philippe Bordeyne, rector of the Institut Catholique de Paris, (France)

Msgr. Lluis Clavell, ordinary member of the Pontifical Academy of St. Thomas Aquinas, (Spain)

Msgr. Duarte Nuno Queiroz De Barros Da Cunha, secretary general of the Consilium Conferentiarum Episcoporum Europae (C.C.E.E.), (Portugal)

Mr. Leopold Djogbede, professor at the University of Abomey-Calavi and at the Higher Institute Specialist Teacher Training (Benin)

Fr. Bruno Esposito, O.P., ordinary professor of canon law at the Pontifical University of St. Thomas Aquinas, (Italy)

Dr. John Grabowski, Spain, professor of moral theology at the School of Theology and Religious Studies, Catholic University of America, (United States of America)

Fr. Jose Granados, D.C.J.M., deputy director of the Pontifical John Paul II Institute for Studies on Marriage and Family

Fr. Maurizio Gronchi, ordinary professor of dogmatic at the Pontifical Urban University in Rome, (Italy)

Dr. John Kleinsman, director of the Nathaniel Centre for Bioethics, New Zealand Catholic Bishops' Conference, (New Zealand)

Fr. Sabatino Majorano, C.SS.R., professor of systematic moral theology at the Alphonsian Academy in Rome, (Italy)

Msgr. Michele Giulio Masciarelli, lecturer in dogmatic theology at the Marianum Faculty in Rome, and in fundamental theology at the Theological Institute of Abruzzo and Molise in Chieti, Italy

Professor Pia Matthews, lecturer at St. Mary's University College, London, (Great Britain)

Professor Paolo Moneta, former lecturer in canon and ecclesiastical law at the Faculty of Law of the University of Pisa, Italy

Fr. Antonio Moser, O.F.M., professor emeritus of moral and ethical theology at the Franciscan Theological Institute of Petropolis, (Brazil)

Fr. Aimable Musoni, S.D.B., lecturer in systematic theology, ecclesiology and ecumenism at the Pontifical Salesian University in Rome, (Rwanda)

Fr. Georges Henri Ruyssen, S.J., lecturer in the Faculty of Canon Law at the Pontifical Oriental Institute in Rome, (Belgium)

Fr. Peter Paul Saldanha, lecturer in ecclesiology at the Pontifical Urban University in Rome, India

Fr. Pierangelo Sequeri, director and lecturer in theology at the Theological Faculty of Northern Italy, member of the International Theological Commission, (Italy)

Mr. and Mrs Miano, (Italy):

Professor Giuseppina De Simone in Miano, lecturer in philosophy at the Theological Faculty of Southern Italy in Naples

Professor Francesco Miano, lecturer in moral philosophy at the University of Rome.

== Auditors ==
Mr. Jacob Mundaplakal Abraham, advisor for the Apostolate of the Family and Lay Organisations in the dioceses of Kerala, India

Dr. Anca Maria Cernea, physician at the Victor Babes Centre for Diagnosis and Treatment and president of the Association of Catholic Doctors of Bucharest, Romania

Ms. Sharron Cole, president of the Parents Centres New Zealand, New Zealand

Ms. Agnes Offiong Erogunaye, national president of the Catholic Women's Organisation of Nigeria, Nigeria

Fr. Garas Boulos Garas Bishay, pastor of the Virgin Mary Queen of Peace parish, Sharm el Sheikh, Egypt

Professor Giovanni Giacobbe, member of the Union of Italian Catholic Jurists, Italy

Ms. Maria Gomes, head of parish family pastoral ministry in Dubai, United Arab Emirates

Ms. Maria Harries, national director for family pastoral care and preparation for marriage; member of the National Commission for Abuse of Minors, Australia

S. Maureen Kelleher, religious of the Sacred Heart of Mary, member of the International Union of Superiors General (U.I.S.G.), United States of America

Mr. Brenda Kim Nayoug, pastoral worker for young people and young married couples, Korea

Professor Maria Marcela Mazzini, lecturer in theology at the Faculty of Theology of the Pontifical Catholic University of Argentina, Argentina

Ms. Moira McQueen, director of the Canadian Catholic Institute of Bioethics, Canada

Ms. Therese Nyirabukeye, advisor and formator for the African Federation of Family Action (FAAF), Rwanda

S. Berta Maria Porras Fallas, head of Family Pastoral Care of the Tertiary Capuchin Sisters of the Holy Family, Member of the International Union of Superiors General (U.I.S.G.), Costa Rica

S. Carmen Sammut, S.M.N.D.A., president of the International Union of Superiors General (U.I.S.G.), Malta

Professor Lucia Scaraffia, former lecturer in contemporary history at the University of Rome La Sapienza; coordinator of the monthly of the L'Osservatore Romano "Donne Chiesa Mondo", Italy

Dr. Edgar Humberto Tejada Zeballos, physician and specialist in bioethics; member of the Episcopal Commission for the Family of the Peruvian Episcopal Conference, Peru.

Mr. and Mrs. Bajaj, India

Mrs. Penny and Mr. Ishwar Bajaj, Hindu-Christian couple from the diocese of Mumbai, India

Mr. and Mrs. Buch, Germany

Sig.ra Petra Buch, diocesan family pastoral worker

Dr. Aloys Johann Buch, professor of moral theology at the Interdiocesan Major Seminary of St. Lambert; permanent deacon of the diocese of Aachen

Mr. and Mrs. Diaz Victoria, Colombia

Mrs. Isabel Botia de Diaz and Mr. Humberto Diaz Victoria, members of the National Commission for the Family of the Episcopal Conference; pastoral directors of the Hombres y Mujeres de futuro Foundation

Mr. and Mrs. Galindo, Mexico

Mrs. Gertrudiz Clara Rubio De Galindo and Mr. Andres Salvador Galindo Lopez, executive secretaries of the Episcopal Commission for the Family of the Episcopal Conference; secretaries of CELAM for the Mexico-Central America zone

Mr. and Mrs. Gay Montalvo, Spain

Mrs. María Monserrat Rosell Torrus De Gay Montalvo, member of the marriage group of the parish of St. Francis de Sales in Barcelona

Mr. Eugenio Gay Montalvo, former Magistrate of the Constitutional Court of Spain; former member of the diocesan Pastoral Council of Barcelona

Mr. and Mrs. Kola, Cameroon

Mrs. Aicha Marianne Kenne Sob Kola and Mr. Irenee KOLA, members of the African Federation of Family Action (FAAF); marriage and family counsellors

Mr. and Mrs. Marqus Odeesho, Iraq

Mrs. Suhaila Salim Toma and Mr. Wisam Marqus Odeesho, pastoral workers in the Chaldean parish of St. George in Baghdad

Mr. and Mrs. Matassoni, Italy

Mrs. Marialucia Zecchini and Mr. Marco Marassoni, members of the Commission for family pastoral care in the archdiocese of Trento

Mr. and Mrs. Mignonat, France

Mrs. Nathalie Mignonat and Mr. Christian Mignonat, members of the movement Equipes Reliance for remarried divorcees, founder members of the group SEDIRE for receiving and accompanying civilly married couples

Mr. and Mrs. Nkosi, South Africa

Mrs. Buysile Patronella Nkosi and Mr. Meshack Jabulani Nkosi, members of the Advisory Committee for the National Family Desk of the Southern African Episcopal Catholic Bishops' Conference.

Mr. and Mrs. Paloni, Italy

Mrs. Patrizia Calabrese and Mr. Massimo Paloni, couple involved in family missionary pastoral work

Mr. and Mrs. Pulikowski, Poland

Mrs. Jadwiga Pulikowska and Mr. Jacek Pulikowski, advisors of the Council for Family Pastoral Care of the archdiocese of Poznan

Mr. and Mrs. De Rezende, Brazil

Mrs. Ketty Abaroa De Rezende and Dr. Pedro Jussieu De Rezende, lecturers at the Universidade Estadual de Campinas, engaged in family pastoral work

Mr. and Mrs. Rojas, Colombia

Mrs. Maria Angelica Rojas, engaged in family pastoral work, and Mr. Luis Haydn Rojas Martinez, director of the department of Ethics and Humanity at the La gran Colombia University

Mr. and Mrs. Salloum, Lebanon

Mrs. Souheila Rizk Salloum, lecturer in psychology at the USEK.

Mr. Georges Fayez Salloum, expert on the Maronite Patriarchal Synod

Mr. and Mrs. Villafania, Philippines

Mrs. María Socorro Ocampo Villafania, former lecturer in theology at the Assumption College; collaborator with the Salesian Sisters in the preparation of catechists

Mr. Nelson Silvestre Villafania, collaborator with the Evangelion Foundation in Manila

Mr. and Mrs. Witczak, United States of America

Mrs. Catherine Wally Witczak and Mr. Anthony Paul Witczak, directors of Worldwide Marriage Encounter International Ecclesial Team.

== General Secretariat of the Synod of Bishops ==
Cardinal Lorenzo Baldisseri, general secretary of the Synod of Bishops

Bishop Fabio Fabene

Msgr. John Anthony Abruzzese

Msgr. Etienne Brocard

Msgr. Daniel Estivill

Fr. Ambrogio Ivan Samus

Fr. Raffaele Lanzilli, S.J.

Fr. Pasquale Bua

Ms. Paola Volterra Toppano

Dr. Federica Vivian

Mr. Pietro Camilli

Mr. Andrea Cimino

=== Collaborators of the General Secretariat ===
Msgr. Zvonimir Sersic of the diocesis of Krk, Croatia

Fr. Giuseppe Deodato of the diocesis of Rome, Italy

=== Assistants ===
Fr. Edouard Akom, Cameroon

Sem. Francesco Argese, Italy

Fr. Emmanuel Ayo, Philippines

Fr. Alexis Bavugamenshi, Burundi

Fr. Diac. Jean-Baptiste Bienvenu, France

Fr. Zvonko Brezovski, Croatia

Fr. Diac. Vincent Chretienne, France

Fr. Emmanuel De Ruyver, Belgium

Fr. Gabriele Di Martino, Italy

Fr. William Donovan, United States of America

Fr. Kim D'Souza, Canada

Fr. Georges Eko, Cameroon

Fr. Edgar Estrada, Mexico

Fr. Jonathan Flemings, L.C., United States of America

Fr. Cesar Garcia Salazar, Mexico

Fr. Javier Gaxiola Loustaunau, L.C., Mexico

Fr. Tiago Gurgel Do Vale, Brazil

Fr. Juan Iniesta Saez, Spain

Fr. Miroslaw Juchno, Poland

Fr. Thomas Kallikat, India

Fr. P. Laurent Mazas, F.S.J., France

Fr. Boniface Mungai, Kenya

Fr. Brian Needles, United States of America

Fr. Stephen Prisk, United States of America

Fr. Luis Ramirez Almanra, L.C., Mexico

Fr. Carlos Rodriguez Blanco, Spain

Fr. Roberto Secchi, Italy

Sem. Mattia Seu, Italy

Fr. Jhonny Tannoury, Lebanon

Sem. Liviu-Nicolae Ursu, Romania

Sem. Gabriele Vecchione, Italy

Fr. Biasgiu Virgitti, France.

== Heads of news communication ==
Fr. Federico Lombardi, S.J., director of the Holy See Press Office, Vatican City

Fr. Ciro Benedettini, C.P., deputy director of the Holy See Press Office, Vatican City

English

Fr. Thomas Rosica, C.S.B., Chief Executive Officer of the Salt and Light Catholic Media Foundation, Canada

French

Ms. Romilda Ferrauto, director of the French Section of Vatican Radio

German

Fr. Bernard Hagenkord, S.J., director of the German Section of Vatican Radio

Spanish

Fr. Manuel Dorantes, parish priest, archdiocese of Chicago, United States of America.

== Ecumenical Patriarchate ==
Stephanos, Primate of the Orthodox Church of Estonia, Estonia

== Patriarchate of Moscow ==
Hilarion, Metropolitan of Volokolamsk, president of the Department for External Relations of the Patriarchate of Moscow, Russian Federation

== Serbian Patriarchate ==
Andrej, Bishop of Austria and Switzerland, Austria

== Orthodox Church of Romania ==
Iosif, Metropolitan of Western Europe, France

== Orthodox Church of Albania ==
Bishop Andon of Kruja, Albania

== Coptic Orthodox Church of Alexandria ==
Pishoy, Metropolitan of Damietta, Kafr Elsheikh and Elbarari, Egypt

== Syriac-Orthodox Patriarchate of Antioch and All the East ==
Mar Youstinos Boulos, archbishop of Zahle and Bekaa, Lebanon

== Anglican Communion ==
- Tim Thornton, Bishop of Truro (Church of England)

== World Lutheran Federation ==
Ndanganeni Petrus Phaswana, bishop emeritus of the Evangelical Church in South Africa, South Africa

== World Methodist Council ==
Rev. Dr. Tim MacQuiban, director of the ecumenical office of the Methodist Church in Rome, Italy

== Christian Church (Disciples of Christ) ==
Rev. Dr. Robert K. Welsh, president of the Council of the Christian Church (Disciples of Christ), United States of America

== Baptist World Alliance ==
Rev. Dr. A. Roy Medley, general secretary of the Baptist Churches in the United States of America, United States of America

== World Council of Churches ==
Rev. Dr. Walter Altmann, Brazil

== World Evangelical Alliance ==
The Very Reverend Thomas Schirrmacher, president of the Theological Commission of the World Evangelical Alliance, Germany.
