= Kambanda =

Kambanda is a surname. Notable people with the surname include:

- Antoine Kambanda (born 1958), Rwandan Roman Catholic archbishop
- Jean Kambanda (born 1955), Rwandan politician
