= Cathedral Basilica of Our Lady =

Church in Kabgayi, Rwanda

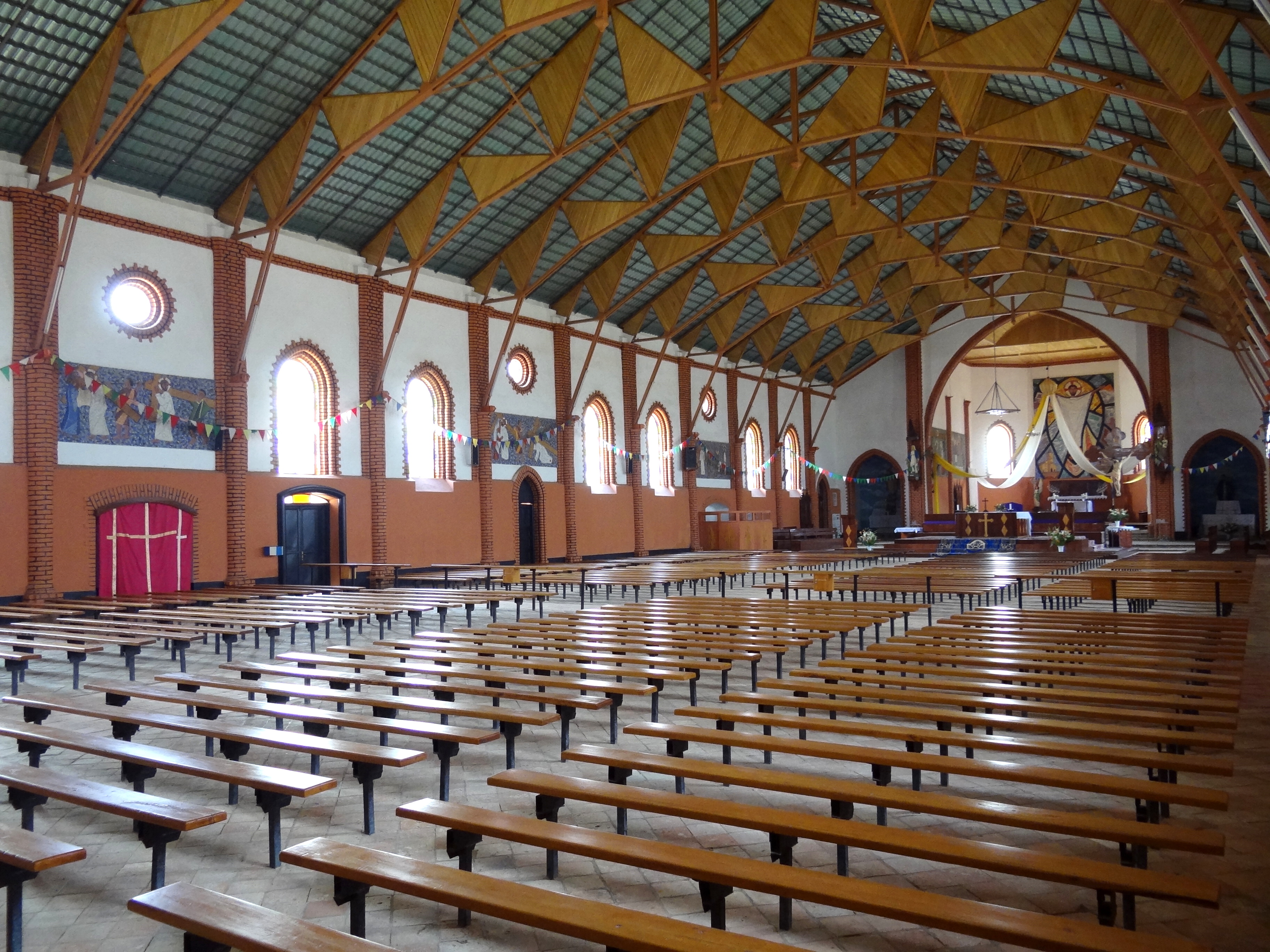
Inside of the Cathedral

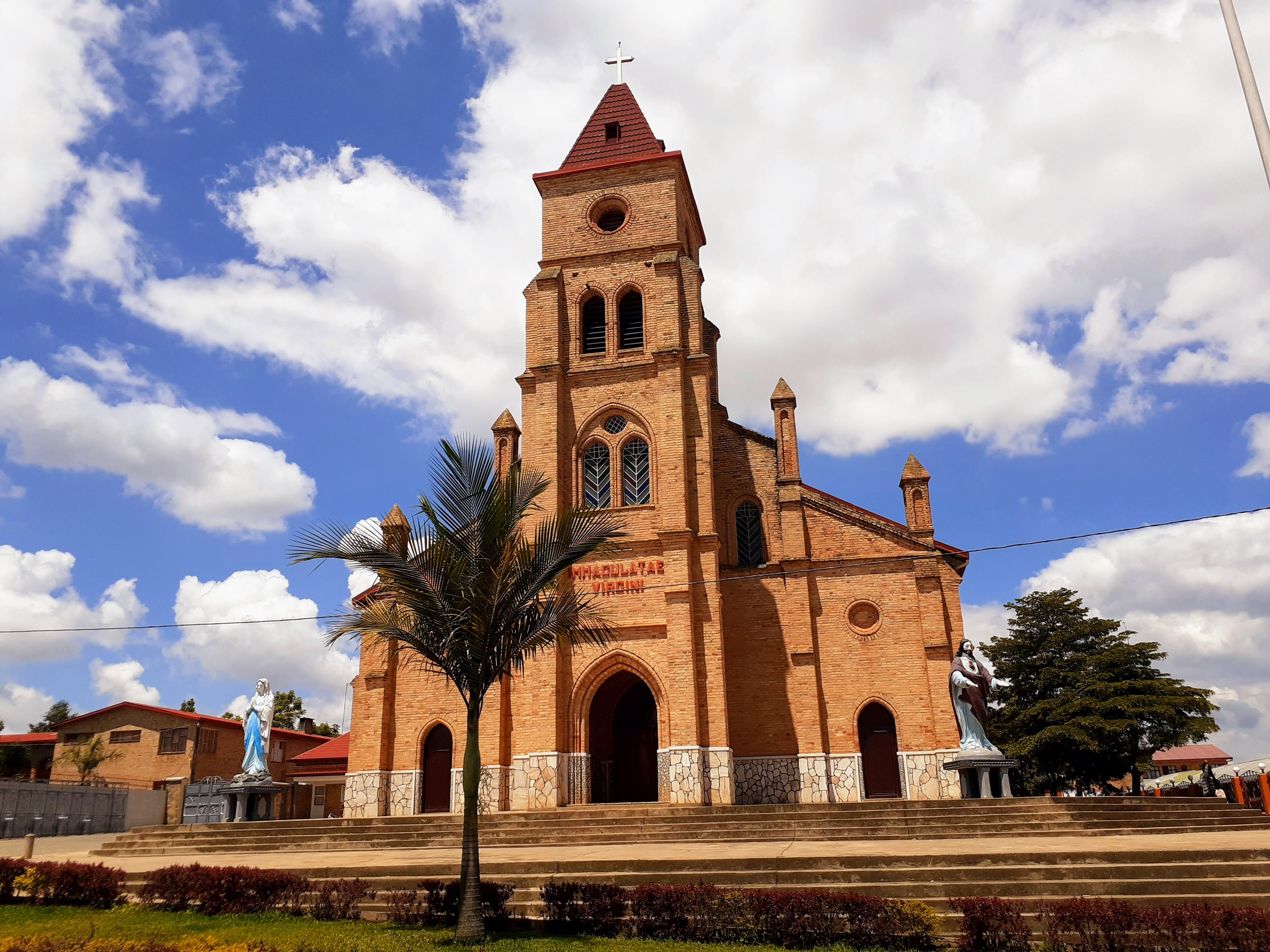
Kiliziya ya KABGAYI

The Cathedral Basilica of Our Lady is a Roman Catholic cathedral and minor basilica dedicated to the Blessed Virgin Mary located in Kabgayi, Rwanda. The basilica is the seat of the Diocese of Kabgayi. The basilica was dedicated on October 22, 1992.
