= Episcopal Conference of Rwanda =

Assembly of Catholic bishops

The Episcopal Conference of Rwanda (French: Conférence Episcopal du Rwanda, CER), established on June 6, 1980, is the episcopal conference of the Catholic Church in Rwanda.

The conference is a member of the Association of Episcopal Conferences of Central Africa (ACEAC) and Symposium of Episcopal Conferences of Africa and Madagascar (SECAM).

== Presidents ==
List of presidents of the Bishops' Conference:

1980–1983: Vincent Nsengiyumva, Archbishop of Archdiocese of Kigali

1983–1991: Joseph Ruzindana, Bishop of Diocese of Byumba

1991–1994: Vincent Nsengiyumva, Archbishop of Kigali

1994–2003: Thaddée Ntihinyurwa, Archbishop of Kigali

2003–2010: Alexis Habiyambere, Bishop of Nyundo

2010–2015: Smaragde Mbonyintege, Bishop of Diocese of Kabgayi

2015–2020: Philippe Rukamba, Bishop of Diocese of Butare

2020– : Antoine Cardinal Kambanda, Archbishop of Kigali.
