= André Perraudin =

Swiss clergyman (1914–2003)

Mgr. André Perraudin, M.Afr.
- Archbishop (personal title) emeritus of Kabgayi, Rwanda
- Appointed: 19 December 1955
- Term ended: 7 October 1989
- Predecessor: Laurent-François Déprimoz
- Successor: Thaddée Nsengiyumva

Personal details
- Born: 7 October 1914 Bagnes, Canton of Valais, Switzerland
- Died: 25 April 2003 (aged 88) Sierre, Canton of Valais, Switzerland
- Denomination: Catholic
- Motto: Super Omnia Caritas

André Perraudin (7 October 1914 – 25 April 2003) was a Swiss Catholic clergyman who lived in Rwanda for nearly fifty years. He was Archbishop of Kabgayi from 1959 to 1989.

== Career ==
André Perraudin was born on 7 October 1914 in Bagnes, in the canton of Valais in Switzerland. He began studying under the White Fathers in the fall of 1926, and was ordained a priest on 25 March 1939. He became the founder and director of the White Father's African House at Fribourg. On 2 December 1947 he left for Burundi, where he learned the local language while serving in missions at Kiganda and Kibumbu. In June 1950 he was appointed professor of theological dogma at the Major Seminary of Nyakibanda in Rwanda. He was appointed rector of the seminary in October 1952. On 18 December 1955 he was elevated to Bishop by Pope Pius XII, and became Vicar Apostolic of Nyundo (Kabgayi) on 25 March 1956. He was appointed Archbishop of Kabgayi, Rwanda on 10 November 1959, holding this position until his retirement on 7 October 1989; Kabgayi was downgraded to diocese in 1976, and he continued as Archbishop (personal title). He died on 25 April 2003 in Sierre.

== February 1959 Pastoral letter ==
In his pastoral letter of 11 February 1959 the Bishop, concerning social justice, wrote in part: "In our Rwanda, differences and social inequalities are to a large extent related to differences in race, in the sense that the wealth on the one hand and political and even judicial power on the other hand, are to a considerable extent in the hands of people of the same race." In a context of strong tensions between the subordinate Hutu majority and the Tutsi elite, these remarks reinforced the support of the Rwandan Catholic Church for the claims of the Hutus for compensation. They were perceived by part of the population as a declaration of war against the Tutsi power and, subsequently, as a form of moral justification for the first massacres of Tutsis that followed in the region of Kabgayi in November 1959. The letter marked a turning point in the history of Rwanda. At this stage of Rwandan history, the written debate on political issues was important like never before. His letter came after the Tutsi-supremacist "Statement of Views", the Hutu-supremacist "Bahutu Manifesto" and the Voici les details de l'histoire. All of these written materials were influential in Rwandan politics of the 1950s and after.

== Publications ==
- Un évêque au Rwanda : " Par-dessus tout la charité " : les six premières années de mon épiscopat (1956-1962). Saint-Maurice: Saint-Augustin. 2003. p. 443. ISBN 2-88011-295-8.
