= Anastase Mutabazi =

Rwandan Catholic prelate (born 1952)

The Most Reverend Anastase Mutabazi
- Bishop Emeritus of Kabgayi, Rwanda
- Church: Roman Catholic Church
- Archdiocese: Roman Catholic Archdiocese of Kigali
- Diocese: Kabgayi
- Appointed: 13 March 1996
- Installed: 26 May 1996
- Term ended: 10 December 2004
- Predecessor: Papias Musengamana
- Successor: Smaragde Mbonyintege

Orders
- Ordination: 25 July 1980
- Consecration: 26 May 1996 by Joseph Sibomana

Personal details
- Born: 24 December 1952 (age 73) Birenga, Ngoma District, Eastern Province, Diocese of Kibungo, Rwanda
- Denomination: Roman Catholic

Anastase Mutabazi (born 24 December 1952) is a Rwandan Catholic prelate. He served as Bishop of the Roman Catholic Diocese of Kabgayi from 1996 until his resignation in 2004. He was appointed bishop on 13 March 1996 by Pope John Paul II. He resigned on 10 December 2004, two weeks shy of his 52nd birthday. The Holy Father John Paul II accepted his resignation. He lives on as Bishop Emeritus of Kabgayi, Rwanda.

== Early years and education ==
He was born on 24 December 1952 in Birenga, Ngoma District, Eastern Province, Diocese of Kibungo, in Rwanda. He studied philosophy and theology and was ordained a priest in March 1996.

== Priest ==
He was ordained a priest of the Roman Catholic Diocese of Kibungo, Rwanda on 25 July 1980. He served in that capacity until 13 March 1996.

== Bishop ==
On 13 March 1996 Pope John Paul II appointed him Bishop of Kabgayi Diocese. He was consecrated and installed at Kabgayi on 26 May 1996 by the hands of Bishop Joseph Sibomana, Bishop Emeritus of Kibungo assisted by Archbishop Thaddée Ntihinyurwa, Archbishop of Kigali and Bishop Frédéric Rubwejanga, Bishop of Kibungo.

On 10 December 2004, The Holy Father John Paul II accepted the resignation request from "the pastoral government of the Diocese of Kabgayi", presented by Bishop Anastase Mutabazi. The Pope appointed Bishop Thaddée Ntihinyurwa, Archbishop of Kigali as Apostolic Administrator for Kabgayi that same day. Bishop Anastase Mutabazi lives on as Bishop Emeritus of Kabgayi, Rwanda.

== See also ==
- Catholic Church in Rwanda

== Succession table ==
Catholic Church titles
Preceded by Thaddée Nsengiyumva (7 October 1989 - 5 June 1994)	Bishop of Kabgayi; 13 March 1996 - 10 December 2004	Succeeded by Smaragde Mbonyintege (21 January 2006 - 2 May 2023)
