= Diocese of Kabgayi =

Diocese of the Catholic Church in Rwanda

Coordinates: 2.1007°S 29.7520°E

Diocese of Kabgayi Dioecesis Kabgayensis
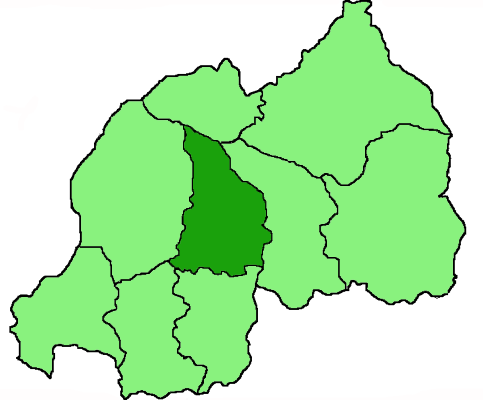

Location
- Country: Rwanda
- Metropolitan: Kigali

Statistics
- Area: 2,187 km^{2} (844 sq mi)
- Population: Total; Catholics: (as of 2004); 974,075; 600,273 (61.6%)

Information
- Rite: Latin Rite
- Cathedral: Cathedral Basilica of Our Lady

Current leadership
- Pope: Leo XIV
- Bishop elect: Balthazar Ntivuguruzwa
- Bishops emeritus: Smaragde Mbonyintege

The Roman Catholic Diocese of Kabgayi (Latin: Kabgayen(sis)) is a diocese located in the city of Kabgayi in the ecclesiastical province of Kigali in Rwanda.

== History ==
- April 25, 1922: The Apostolic Vicariate of Ruanda was established from the northern part of the Apostolic Vicariate of Kivu.
- February 14, 1952: The Apostolic Vicariate of Ruanda was divided into the Apostolic Vicariate of Kabgayi and the Apostolic Vicariate of Nyundo.
- November 10, 1959: The Apostolic Vicariate of Kabgayi was promoted as Metropolitan Archdiocese of Kabgayi.
- April 10, 1976: Demoted as Diocese of Kabgayi; became a suffragan of Kigali

== Leadership ==
Vicars Apostolic of Ruanda

- Léon-Paul Classe, M. Afr. (1922.04.10 - 1945.01.31)
- Laurent-François Déprimoz, M. Afr. (1945.01.31 – 1952.02.14)

Vicars Apostolic of Kabgayi

- Laurent-François Déprimoz, M. Afr. (1952.02.14 – 1955.04.15)
- André Perraudin, M. Afr. (1955.12.19 – 1959.11.10)

Metropolitan Archbishop of Kabgayi

- André Perraudin, M. Afr. (1959.11.10 – 1976.04.10)

Bishops of Kabgayi

- André Perraudin, M. Afr. (1976.04.10 – 1989.10.07)
- Thaddée Nsengiyumva (1989.10.07 – 1994.06.0)
  - Fr. André Sibomana (Apostolic Administrator 1994.11.11 – 1996.03.13)
- Anastase Mutabazi (1996.03.13 – 2004.12.10)
- Smaragde Mbonyintege (21 January 2006 – 2 May 2023)
- Balthazar Ntivuguruzwa, bishop elect (2 May 2023 – present)

=== Coadjutor Bishops ===
- Laurent-François Déprimoz, M. Afr. (1943-1945), Coadjutor Vicar Apostolic
- Thaddée Nsengiyumva (1987-1989)

=== Other priests of this diocese who became bishops ===
- Jean-Baptiste Gahamanyi, appointed Bishop of Astrida in 1961
- Joseph Sibomana, appointed Bishop of Ruhengeri in 1961

== See also ==
- Roman Catholicism in Rwanda
