= Smaragde Mbonyintege =

Rwandan Roman Catholic prelate (born 1947)

The Most Reverend Smaragde Mbonyintege
- Bishop Emeritus of Kabgayi
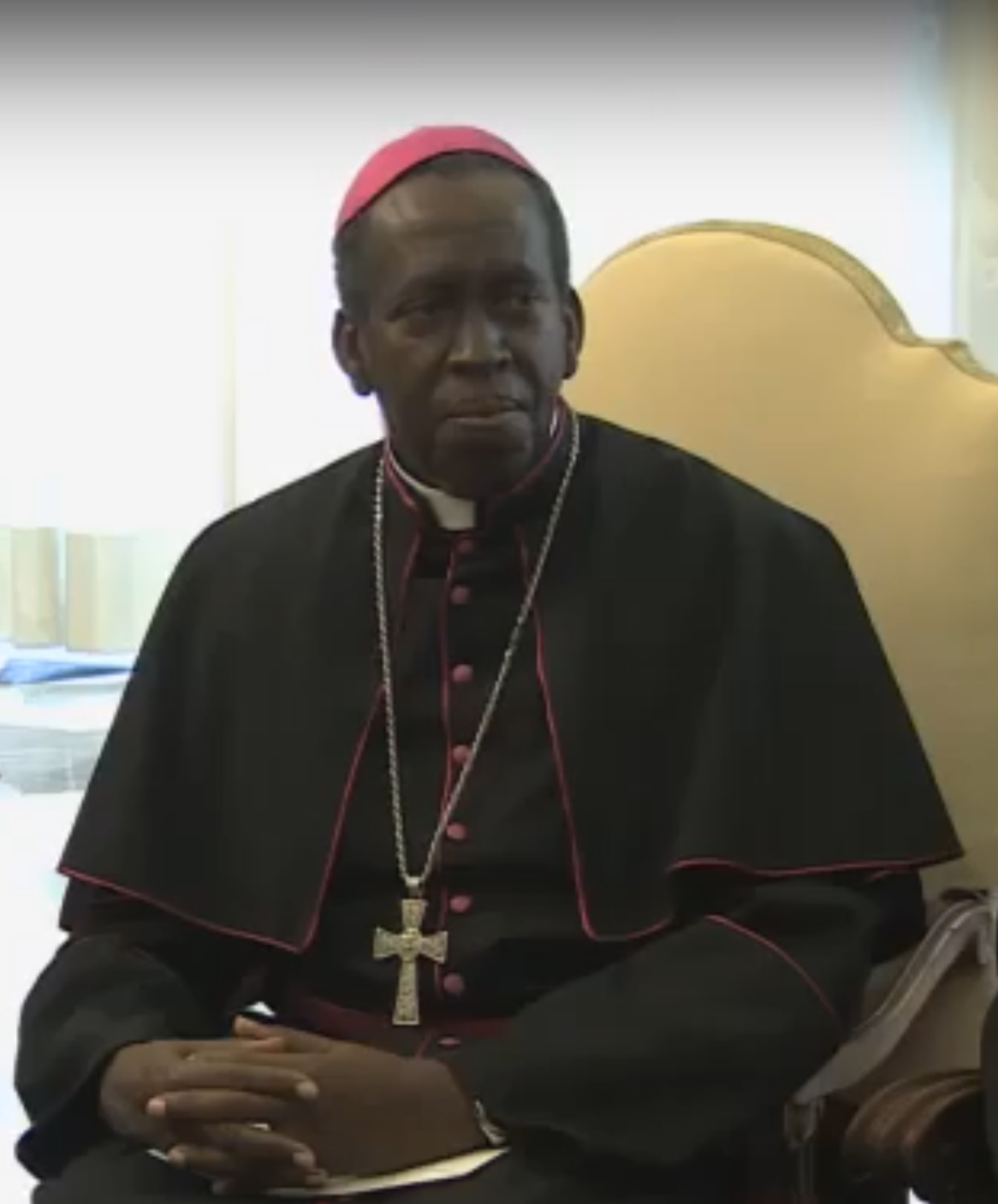
- Church: Catholic Church
- Diocese: Kabgayi
- Appointed: 21 January 2006
- Installed: 26 March 2006
- Term ended: 2 May 2023
- Predecessor: Anastase Mutabazi
- Successor: Balthazar Ntivuguruzwa
- Other post: President of the Association of Episcopal Conferences of Central Africa (2013-)
- Previous post: President of the Rwandan Episcopal Conference (2010-2015)

Orders
- Ordination: 20 July 1975 by André Perraudin
- Consecration: 26 March 2006 by Thaddée Ntihinyurwa

Personal details
- Born: Smaragde Mbonyintege; 2 February 1947 (age 79) Kabgayi, Rwanda
- Denomination: Catholic Church
- Education: Saint Charles Borromeo Major Seminary; Pontifical Gregorian University
- Motto: Lumen Christi spes mea ("The Light of Christ is my hope")

Smaragde Mbonyintege (born 2 February 1947) is a Rwandan prelate of the Catholic Church who was Bishop of Kabgayi in Rwanda from 2006 until 2023. He was appointed Bishop of Kabgayi Diocese by Pope Benedict XVI on 21 January 2006. His age-related retirement was accepted by Pope Francis and took effect on 2 May 2023. He now lives on as Bishop Emeritus of Kabgayi, Rwanda.

== Early life and education ==
Smaragde Mbonyintege was born on 2 February 1947 in Cyeza Parish, Kabgayi Diocese, in the Kamonyi District, in the Southern Province of Rwanda. On 20 May 1960 he was baptized Catholic in Kabgayi, when he was 13 years old. He received his confirmation on 5 July 1960.

He attended primary school in Shyanda, in Kabgayi Parish. He then attended lower secondary school in Byimana. He then studied at the Marist Brothers Teacher Training College in Save in Gisagara District in Rwanda's Southern Province. He studied at the St. Paul Minor Seminary Kigali in the Archdiocese of Kigali.

From 1969 until 1975 he attended Saint Charles Borromeo Major Seminary of Nyakibanda and while there he studied both Philosophy (1969-1972) and Theology (1972-1975). He attended the Pontifical Gregorian University in Rome, Italy, from 1979 until 1983, graduating with a Master of Arts degree in Spiritual Theology. Later, he graduated from the same university in Rome, Italy with a Doctorate in Theology.

== Priest ==
He was ordained a priest of the Catholic Diocese of Kabgayi, Rwanda on 20 July 1975. The ceremony was held in Cyeza Parish. He is the first priest of this parish. He served in that role until 21 January 2006.

As a priest he served in many capacities inside and outside his diocese including as:

- Vicar in the Parish of Kabgayi from 1975 until 1979.
- Chaplain of the diocesan Youth and the "Charismatic Renewal" Movement from 1975 until 1979.
- Bursar at the St. John Senior Seminary Kamonyi starting in 1979.
- Professor and Rector at the St. John Senior Seminary Kamonyi from 1978 until 1979.
- Professor and Spiritual Father at the Saint Charles Borromeo Major Seminary in Nyakibanda from 1983 until 1996.
- Director of the Spirituality and Theology Review "Urumuri rwa Kristu" (Lumen Christi) in 1989.
- Rector of the Saint Charles Borromeo Major Seminary in Nyakibanda from 1996 until 2006.

== Bishop ==
On 22 January 2006 Pope Benedict XVI appointed him Bishop of Kabgayi, Rwanda. He was consecrated and installed at Kabgayi on 26 March 2006 by the hands of Archbishop Thaddée Ntihinyurwa, Archbishop of Kigali assisted by Bishop Frédéric Rubwejanga, Bishop of Kibungo and Bishop Philippe Rukamba, Bishop of Butare.

On 2 May 2023, Pope Francis accepted the resignation of Bishop Smaragde Mbonyintege from the pastoral care of the Catholic Diocese of Kabgayi in Rwanda. On the same day, The Holy Father appointed Monsignor Balthazar Ntivuguruzwa as his successor at Kabgayi.

As of 2013 he was the chairman of the Episcopal Commission responsible for the Clergy, Major Seminaries. He also served as the chairman of the Episcopal Commission for Consecrated Women and that for Ecumenism. He served as the elected president of the Episcopal Conference of Rwanda (ECR).

== See also ==
- Catholic Church in Rwanda

== Succession table ==
Catholic Church titles
Preceded by Anastase Mutabazi (13 March 1996 - 10 December 2004)	Bishop of Kabgayi (21 January 2006 - 2 May 2023)	Succeeded by Balthazar Ntivuguruzwa (since 2 May 2023)
