= Joseph Ruzindana =

Rwandan bishop

Mgr. Joseph Ruzindana
- Bishop of Byumba, Rwanda
- Appointed: 5 November 1981
- Installed: 17 January 1982
- Term ended: 7 June 1994
- Successor: Servilien Nzakamwita

Personal details
- Born: 3 June 1943 Rambura
- Died: 5 June 1994 (aged 51) Kabgayi
- Denomination: Catholic

Joseph Ruzindana (3 June 1943 – 5 June 1994) was a Catholic Bishop of Byumba in Rwanda.

Joseph Ruzindana was born on 3 June 1943 in Rambura. On 23 July 1972 he was ordained priest of Byumba. He was appointed Bishop of Byumba on 5 November 1981, and ordained on 17 January 1982. The bishopric of Byumba was newly formed through a division of the diocese of Ruhengeri.

During the Rwandan genocide, Ruzindana was killed on 5 June 1994 by soldiers of the Rwandan Patriotic Front (RPF), along with Vincent Nsengiyumva, Archbishop of Kigali, Thaddée Nsengiyumva, Bishop of Kabgayi, nine priests, a senior priest of the Josephite Brothers, and a child. The soldiers who killed them were their guards at Gakurazo, near the Kabgayi church center.
