= Antoine Kambanda =

Rwandan prelate of the Catholic Church (born 1958)

His Eminence Antoine Kambanda
- Cardinal, Archbishop of Kigali; Spiritual Protector and Chaplain General of the Order of Saint Lazarus
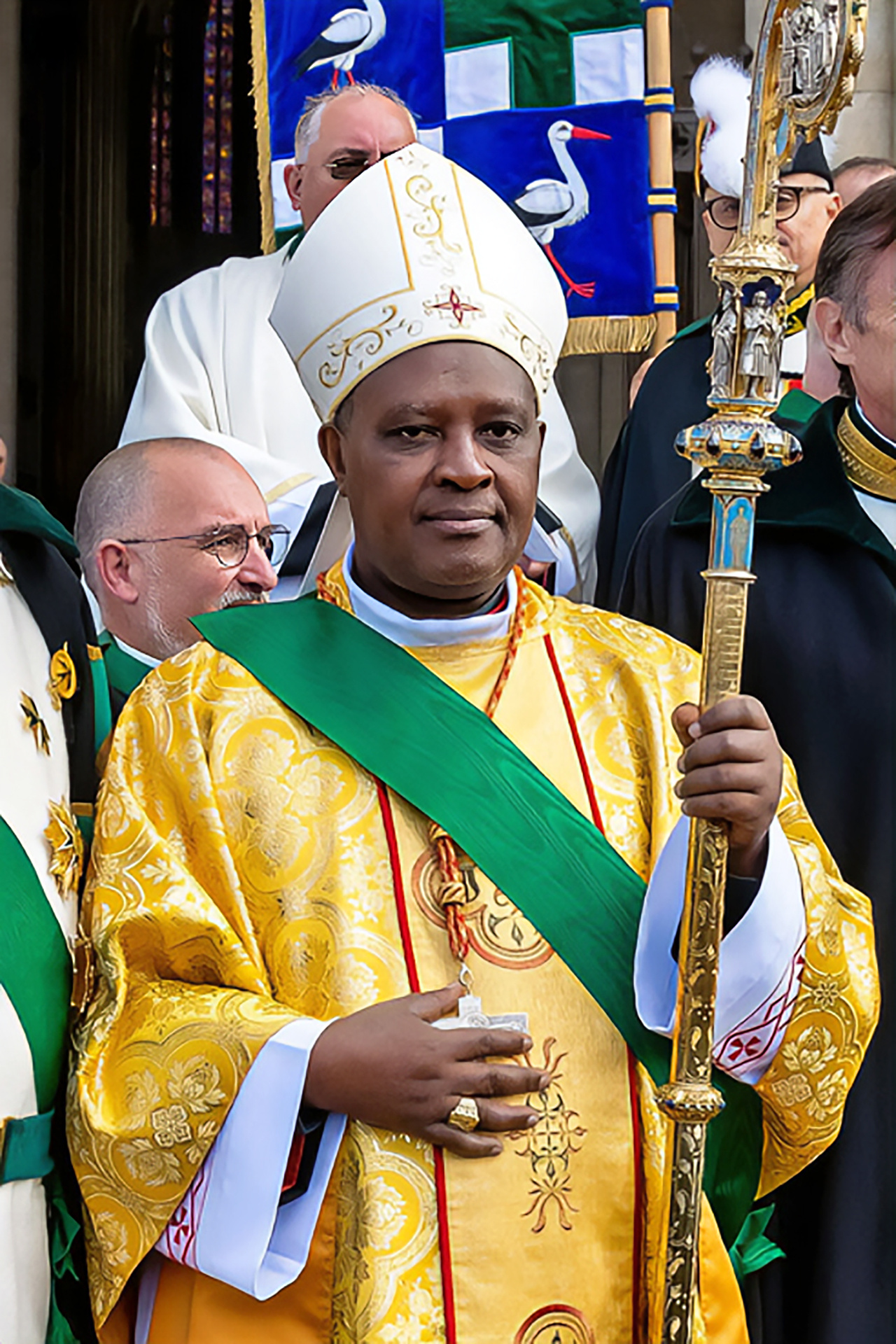
- Church: Roman Catholic Church
- Archdiocese: Kigali
- See: Kigali
- Appointed: 19 November 2018
- Installed: 27 January 2019
- Predecessor: Thaddée Ntihinyurwa
- Other post: Cardinal-Priest of San Sisto (2020-)
- Previous post: Bishop of Kibungo (2013-18)

Orders
- Ordination: 8 September 1990 by Pope John Paul II
- Consecration: 20 July 2013 by Thaddée Ntihinyurwa
- Created cardinal: 28 November 2020 by Pope Francis
- Rank: Cardinal-Priest

Personal details
- Born: Antoine Kambanda; 10 November 1958 (age 67) Nyamata, Rwanda
- Education: Nyakibanda Major Seminary; Alphonsian Academy
- Motto: Ut vitam habeant (That they may have life)
- Coat of arms

Antoine Kambanda (born 10 November 1958) is a Rwandan prelate of the Catholic Church who has been Archbishop of Kigali since 2019. He was Bishop of Kibungo from 2013 to 2018.

Pope Francis raised him to the rank of cardinal on 28 November 2020, making him the first cardinal from Rwanda. He is current Spiritual Protector and Chaplain General of the Orléans obedience of the Military and Hospitaller Order of Saint Lazarus of Jerusalem.

== Early years ==
Antoine Kambanda was born on 10 November 1958 in Rwanda. Because of inter-ethnic violence, his family moved briefly to Burundi and then to Uganda, where he attended elementary, and then to Kenya, where he attended high school. Later he returned to his homeland, where he attended the junior Seminary in Rutongo, Kigali, (1983–1984) and the Saint Charles Borromeo Major Seminary of Nyakibanda in Butare (1984–1990). On 8 September 1990, he was ordained a priest in Kabgayi by Pope John Paul II. After that he was Prefect of Studies from 1990 to 1993 in the minor seminary of St. Vincent in Ndera, Kigali. He then attended the Alphonsian Academy in Rome from 1993 to 1999, where he obtained a doctorate in moral theology. His parents and five of his six siblings, along with many other relatives and friends, were killed in 1994 during the genocide against the Tutsi.

== Priest ==
Kambanda was appointed Director of the diocesan office of Caritas in Kigali in 1999. He then became director of the Development Committee of the Diocese of Kigali, head of the "Justice and Peace" Commission of the diocese, and professor of moral theology and visitor at the Nyakibanda Major Seminary. Speaking in 2004 of the 1994 Rwandan genocide, Kambanda acknowledged that while some members of the Catholic clergy had tried to protect the people, others had been complicit in the killings. Kambanda noted the need for the Catholic Church itself to undergo reconstruction to shake off the effects of the genocide. He has said "the use of the sacrament of penance for reconciliation and healing of ethnic hatred and the reconciliation with oneself, with God and with the others, would be significant to develop a faith characterized by trust that overcomes the fear of the other."

In September 2005 Cardinal Crescenzio Sepe appointed him rector of the inter-diocesan major philosophy seminary in Kabgayi. On 10 February 2006 Kambanda was appointed rector of the Saint Charles Borromeo Major Seminary of Nyakibanda. He replaced Monseigneur Smaragde Mbonyintege, who had been named a bishop.

In June 2011 he led five hundred Rwandan pilgrims to Namugongo, Uganda, to join the Martyrs Day ceremonies to commemorate the 45 Christian converts who were killed in 1884 by King Mwanga II of Buganda. In his sermon, he said that the sacrifice the martyrs made had greatly helped the spread of Christianity in Africa by showing missionaries that converts would be willing to die for their faith.

== Bishop and cardinal ==
On 7 May 2013, Pope Francis named Kambanda Bishop of Kibungo. He succeeded Kizito Bahujimihigo, who resigned in January 2010 amid "serious financial problems" in the diocese and threats on the part of creditor banks to seize diocesan assets. The Episcopal Conference of Rwanda elected him to attend the Synod of Bishops in 2015.

On 19 November 2018, Pope Francis named him Archbishop of Kigali.

On 25 October 2020, Pope Francis announced he would raise him to the rank of cardinal at a consistory scheduled for 28 November 2020. At that consistory, Pope Francis made him Cardinal-Priest of San Sisto. On 16 December, he was named a member of the Congregation for the Evangelization of Peoples.

In October 2021, Pope Francis appointed Cardinal Kambanda as a member of the Congregation for Catholic Education.

In August 2022, he was appointed by Grand Master of the Orléans obedience of the Order of Saint Lazarus Jan Dobrzenský z Dobrzenicz as Spiritual Protector and Chaplain general of the Order.

He participated as a cardinal elector in the 2025 papal conclave that elected Pope Leo XIV.

== See also ==
- Cardinals created by Pope Francis

== Succession table ==
Catholic Church titles
Preceded by Kizito Bahujimihigo	Bishop of Kibungo; 7 May 2013 – 19 November 2018	Vacant
Preceded by Thaddée Ntihinyurwa	Archbishop of Kigali; 19 November 2018 –	Incumbent
Preceded by Marian Jaworski	Cardinal-Priest of San Sisto; 28 November 2020 –	Incumbent
Preceded by Dominik Duka	Spiritual Protector and Chaplain General of the Order of St. Lazarus; 10 August 2022 –	Incumbent
