= Nyakibanda Major Seminary =

Roman Catholic Seminary in Butare, Rwanda

Saint Charles Borromeo Major Seminary of Nyakibanda
- Other names: Nyakibanda Major Seminary
- Type: Seminary
- Established: 1936; 90 years ago
- Religious affiliation: Catholicism; Conference of Bishops of Rwanda
- Location: Butare, Southern Province, Huye District, Rwanda; 2°39′23″S 29°41′40″E

The Saint Charles Borromeo Major Seminary of Nyakibanda is a Roman Catholic seminary near to Butare, in the Gishamvu sector of the Huye District in Southern Province of Rwanda, below the mountain chain called "Ibisi bya Nyakibanda". It is about 12 kilometres (7.5 mi) from Butare.

== Overview ==
The Nyakibanda Major Seminary was created in 1936. The seminary is under the jurisdiction of the Conference of Bishops of Rwanda, who in turn are under the Holy See in Rome, which is represented by the Congregation for the Evangelization of Peoples.

As of 2007 there were 186 seminarians taking the four-year course. As of 2011 the rector was father Antoine Kambanda. Kambanda was appointed in February 2006. He replaced Monseigneur Smaragde Mbonyintege, who had been named a bishop.
