= André Sibomana =

Rwandan journalist (1954–1998)

André Sibomana (1954–1998) was a Rwandan priest and journalist and an exemplary figure in the Rwandan genocide. He was also a human rights activist and a founder of the Rwandan Association for the Defense of the Rights of the Person and of Public Liberties, which is there to record information on all human rights violations occurring in Rwanda and publish them in a report.

From 1988 André Sibomana was editor of the Roman Catholic newspaper Kinyamateka, owned by the Episcopal Conference, which was the only private newspaper in Rwanda and circulated widely in the Rwandan parishes. Sibomana was committed to true investigative journalism, but he lived in a State that didn't guarantee freedom of information. Since he published independent reports that proved extremely embarrassing for the authorities, he was tried several times in 1990, but in vain as he had the proofs of what he published.

Thus, Sibomana was one of the few independent voices in Rwanda in the period leading up to the genocide. When the latter broke out, he realised he'd soon become a target of the extremists. He escaped from the capital Kigali and he used his position to save the lives of many others. "For many people in Rwanda, refraining from murder was, in itself, an act of resistance. Several peasant farmers were killed because they refused to strike the corpses of their Tutsi neighbours. There are courageous and upright men who were not able or did not dare to come to the aid of their fellows and now live with remorse for having failed to do so. There is no merit in my having rescued a few people, because it was in my power to do so. My position gave me a better chance than others," Sibomana explains on page 86 of the interview he gave to Laure Guibert and Hervé Deguine in 1996 in Israel, which was published later. After the war, André Sibomana returned to his job as editor of Kinyamateka and he supported reconciliation until he died in 1998. He adopted seven orphans.

In 2000, Sibomana was named as one of the International Press Institute's 50 World Press Freedom Heroes of the past 50 years.
