= Kabgayi =

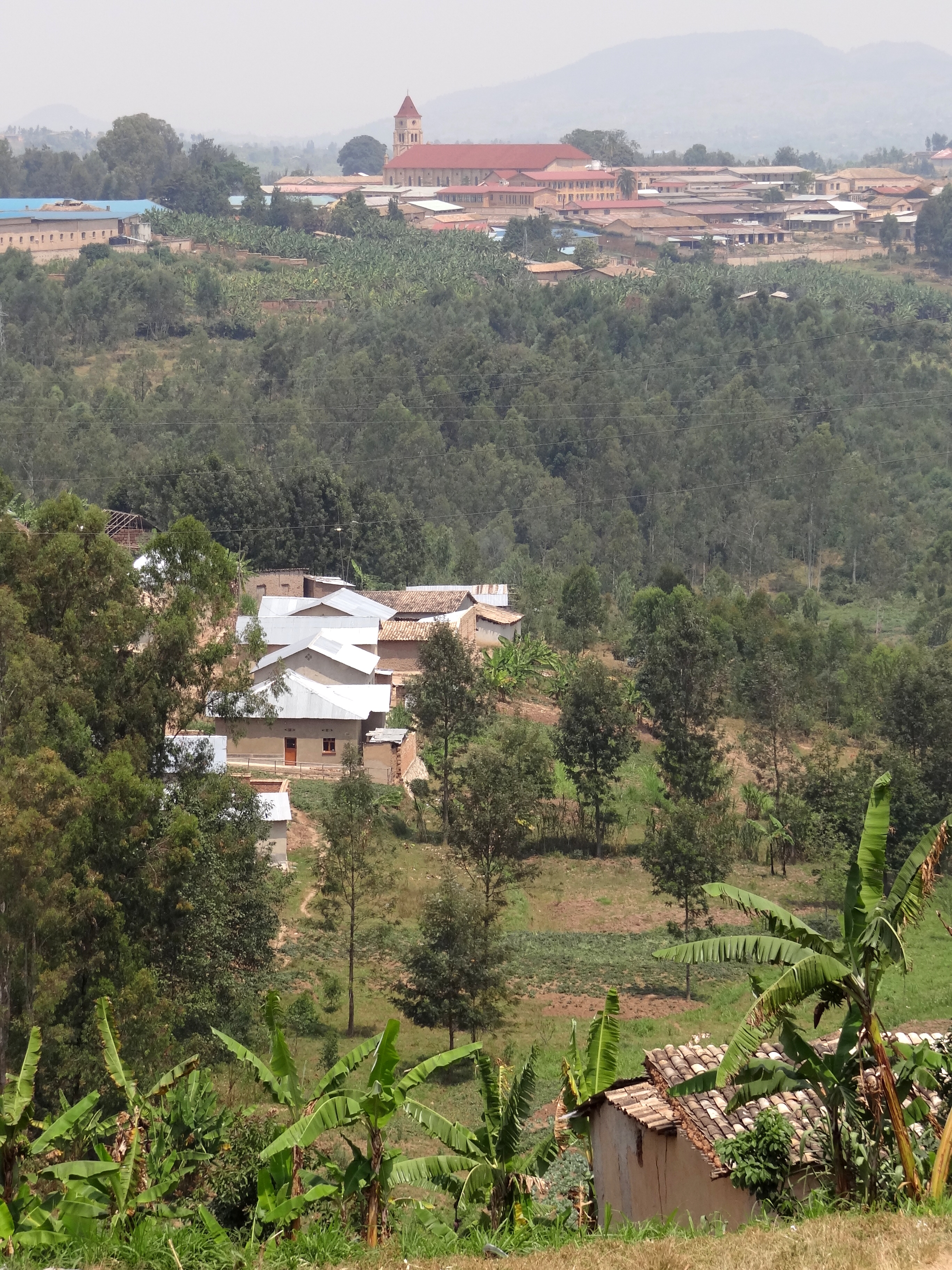
- Suburban View with Kabgayi Cathedral in Distance

- Location in Rwanda
- Coordinates: 2.100718°S 29.752243°E
- Country: Rwanda
- Province: Southern Province
- District: Muhanga District
- City: Gitarama
- Elevation: 5,945 ft (1,812 m)

Kabgayi is located just south of Gitarama in Muhanga District, Southern Province, Rwanda, 25 miles (40 km) southwest of Kigali. It was established as a Catholic Church mission in 1905. It became the center for the Roman Catholic Church in Rwanda and is the site of the oldest cathedral in the country and of Catholic seminaries, schools and a hospital. The church at first supported the Tutsi ruling elite, but later backed the Hutu majority. During the 1994 Rwandan genocide thousands of Tutsis who had taken refuge here were killed. Some survivors admire the courage of many priests who helped them during those difficult days, like Father Evergiste RUKEBESHA and many others. Later, some Hutus including three bishops and many priests were killed by the rebels RPF soldiers. A mass grave beside the hospital is marked by a memorial. Inside the Basilica are kept the bodies of the three bishops killed by FPR rebels. Two of them (Vincent Nsengiyumva, the Archbishop of Kigali and Joseph Ruzindana, Bishop of Byumba) were refused by the Rwandan government to be transferred in their own cathedrals.

== Location ==
Kabgayi lies in the middle of Rwanda's central plateau at an elevation of about 6,000 feet (1,800 m) above sea level. Located in Kamazuru Village of Gahogo Cell in Nyamabuye Sector, it is a 5 minutes’ drive from Muhanga City. The community is just south of Gitarama, the second-largest city in Rwanda, and about 30 kilometres (19 mi) from Kigali, the capital. It has a mild and temperate climate. There are two rainy seasons. Average annual rainfall is 1,000 to 1,100 millimetres (39 to 43 in). Estimated annual evapotranspiration is about 815 millimetres (32.1 in). The soil is sandy and relatively infertile. As of 2002 most of the people in the surrounding Kabgayi district were engaged in farming. Only a few of the wealthier households could afford to own cattle.

== Early history ==
The Kingdom of Rwanda before the European colonial powers arrived was ruled by a Tutsi elite of about 15% of the population over a Hutu peasant class of about 85%. Both are thought to have migrated from elsewhere at some time in the past, the Tutsis from the east and the Hutu from the north. The stereotype is that the Tutsis were tall and slim while the Hutus were shorter and sturdier. The Tutsis were cattle-owners with a warrior tradition and the Hutus were farmers. The two groups shared a common language, kinyarwanda. Wealthy Hutus had married into the Tutsi ruling class, and many Tutsis were poor farmers with no cattle, but there were still social distinctions that set the Tutsis above the Hutus at the start of the colonial era.

At first, the missions in Rwanda were under the Apostolic Vicariate of Southern Victoria Nyanza, headed by John Joseph Hirth. Kabgayi was founded as a mission post after the Germans, the colonial power, had received reluctant permission from the court of King Musinga of Rwanda in 1904. The missionaries received Kabgayi hill in February 1905. They obtained about 120 hectares (300 acres) of land. They embarked on a massive building program, first of houses and then of church buildings, requiring porters, brick layers, cooks, gardeners and other workers. Their demands for labor from the people of the region caused tension with the court. In response, the German authorities informed the missionaries that they must obtain permission from the Court for recruiting labor, and the colonial power would not assist them in this.

However, the mission soon became a power in the land. King Musinga, who was engaged in an internal power struggle, took care to maintain friendly relations with the missionaries, and in December 1906 told them he would like all his people to learn to pray. The Tutsi notables also saw value in good relations with these powerful landowners. Their lengthy visits became a problem to the priests, who could not always give them the attention that courtesy demanded. In July 1907 the fathers began to build a school in Kabgayi for the sons of Tutsi chiefs, whom they considered to be the natural leaders of the country. The fathers sided with a Hutu peasant against his Tutsi overlord when the peasant was in the wrong according to the laws of the land, and again drew censure from the German authorities. In general, though, the missionaries at Kabgayi followed a pro-Tutsi policy.

The church became established in Rwanda. The missions in Burundi, which had been under the Apostolic Vicariate of Unyanyembe, were joined with those of Rwanda to form the Apostolic Vicariate of Kivu. On 12 December 1912, Jean-Joseph Hirth was appointed the first Vicar Apostolic of Kivu. The Minor Seminary of Saint Leon was founded at Kabgayi in 1913. Some of the first students had already been taught at the Rubyia mission in Tanganyika, and could speak better Latin than the old European priests. Hirth established his headquarters at Kabgayi and worked with the Rwandan seminarists there until his retirement in 1921. In 1916, during World War I, the Belgians took over Rwanda and Burundi. They continued German policies, including support of the Tutsi ruling class.

By 1921 there were thirty thousand Christians in the Apostolic Vicariate of Kivu. Kabgayi became the seat of the Apostolic Vicariate of Ruanda when it was created in April 1922, separated from the Apostolic Vicariate of Urundi. In 1928 Alexis Kagame entered the Kabgayi minor seminary. He was to become a major intellectual leader, author and expert on Rwandan traditions and culture. In 1932 the first printing press in Rwanda was installed at Kabgayi. Kinyamateka, the first local journal, began to appear in 1933. Communications gradually improved. In 1938 a track was opened that connected Kabgayi to Rubengera to the west.

== Post war ==
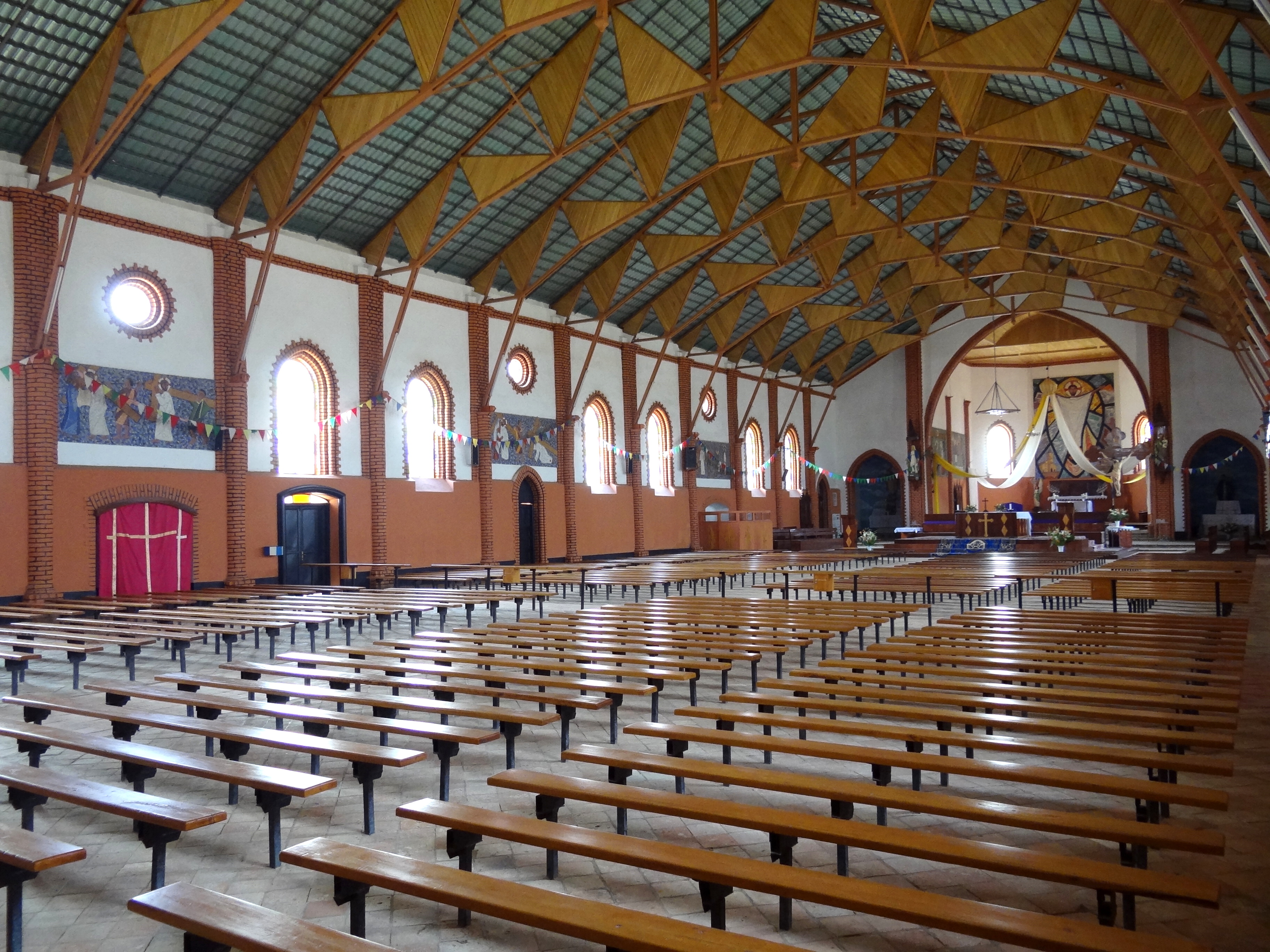
Cathedral Basilica of Our Lady at Kabgayi

The Belgian colonial mandate ended after World War II (1939–1944). In 1946 Rwanda and Burundi were made a trust territory by the United Nations, remaining under Belgian administration. In 1952 Monsignor Aloys Bigirumwami, the first black Roman Catholic bishop in Belgian Africa, was consecrated at Kabgayi. He was later to be a voice in favor of reconciliation between Tutsi and Hutus. In February 1952 the see was renamed the Apostolic Vicariate of Kabgayi. In December 1954 the Kabgayi printing press issued the first number of Hobe, a magazine for children, with eight pages written in the kinyarwanda language. In November 1959 the see was promoted to the Metropolitan Archdiocese of Kabgayi.

In a reversal of their support for the Tutsis, the Catholic church swung behind the Hutu nationalists. In his pastoral letter of 11 February 1959 the Bishop of Kabgayi, André Perraudin, wrote in part: "In our Rwanda, differences and social inequalities are to a large extent related to differences in race, in the sense that the wealth on the one hand and political and even judicial power on the other hand, are to a considerable extent in the hands of people of the same race." These remarks implied that the Rwandan Catholic Church supported the claims of the Hutus. They may have been perceived as a form of moral justification for the first massacres of Tutsis that followed in the region of Kabgayi later that year. In 1959 the church printing press in Kabgayi was even used to produce pamphlets urging the Hutus to use violence against the Tutsis.

On 1 November 1959 the Hutu sub-chief Dominique Mbonyumutwa was assaulted by a gang of Tutsi youths near the Kabgayi mission. He escaped, but rumors that he was dead spread quickly. The next day a group of Hutus attacked four Tutsi notables in the neighboring Ndiza chiefdom, and in the days that followed violence aimed at Tutsis spread throughout Rwanda. During the four-year crisis that ensued, many Tutsis fled to neighboring countries. The Second Vatican Council (1962–1965), with its emphasis on assistance for the poor, contributed to growing support for the Hutus by the Catholic Church, although many of the Tutsis were equally poor.

== Post-independence ==
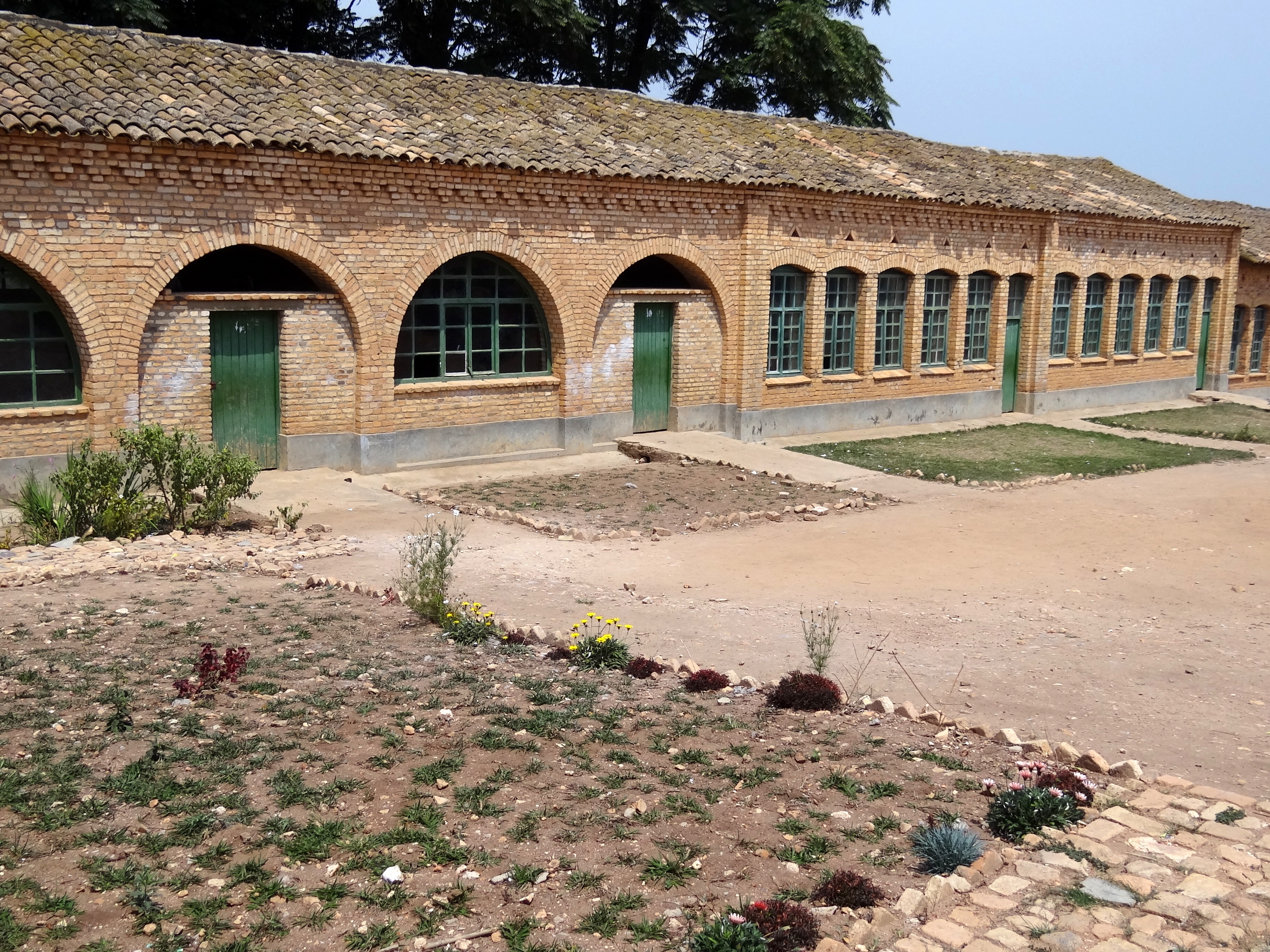
Colonial-Era buildings at Kabgayi Hospital

On 28 January 1961 the National Rwandan Congress declared independence. The declaration by the Hutu-dominated movement was made in Gitarama, just north of Kabgayi. The country officially became independent of Belgium on 1 July 1962. The first President of the country, Grégoire Kayibanda, had been educated at the Kabgayi seminary, as had many of the other Hutu leaders. Kayibanda was the secretary of Archbishop Perraudin at Kabgayi. In 1973 there was a mass murder of Josephite priests in Kabgayi. Both Archbishop Perraudin and President Kayibanda were said to be present, but refused to intervene.

In April 1976 Kabgayi become the seat of the Diocese of Kabgayi after other sees were separated from it. Pope John Paul II visited Kagbayi in September 1990. He spoke out against the gap between the poor peasants of Rwanda and the elite in the cities, and called for equal access to government services and to credit for rural people. The church worked with the government. Vincent Nsengiyumva, the Archbishop of Kigali, became a member of the Hutu MRND ruling party's central committee. A few church leaders objected to excessive Hutu domination. In 1991 the Bishop of Kabgayi, Thaddée Nsengiyumva, issued a pastoral letter that deeply criticized the widespread use of political assassination and lack of interest in reconciliation between the ethnic groups.

Hutu extremists seized power in April 1994 and embarked on a systematic program to kill Tutsis and moderate Hutus. Tutsi refugees from the massacres began to arrive in Kabgayi in mid-April, where they lived in crowded conditions with little food or water, many suffering from malaria or dysentery. Each day, soldiers and militiamen picked out young men to be killed. By the end of May there were about 38,000 refugees in Kabgayi. Kabgayi at this time has been called a "death camp", with the refugees helpless against rape and killings by the militia.

The Rwandan Patriotic Front (RPF), which had been formed by Tutsi exiles in Uganda, fought back and began to gain control of the country. A group of Rwandan bishops appealed to Pope John Paul II asking him to have the Kabgayi religious center made a neutral zone, and the Pope passed on this appeal to the United Nations. The bishops said the Hutu-led army was still providing protection, but if the army were forced to retreat from RPC forces advancing on Kabgayi, they could not protect the refugees from the Hutu militias. U.N. observers dispatched to Kabgayi saw no signs of a massacre, but reported that the refugees were being intimidated.

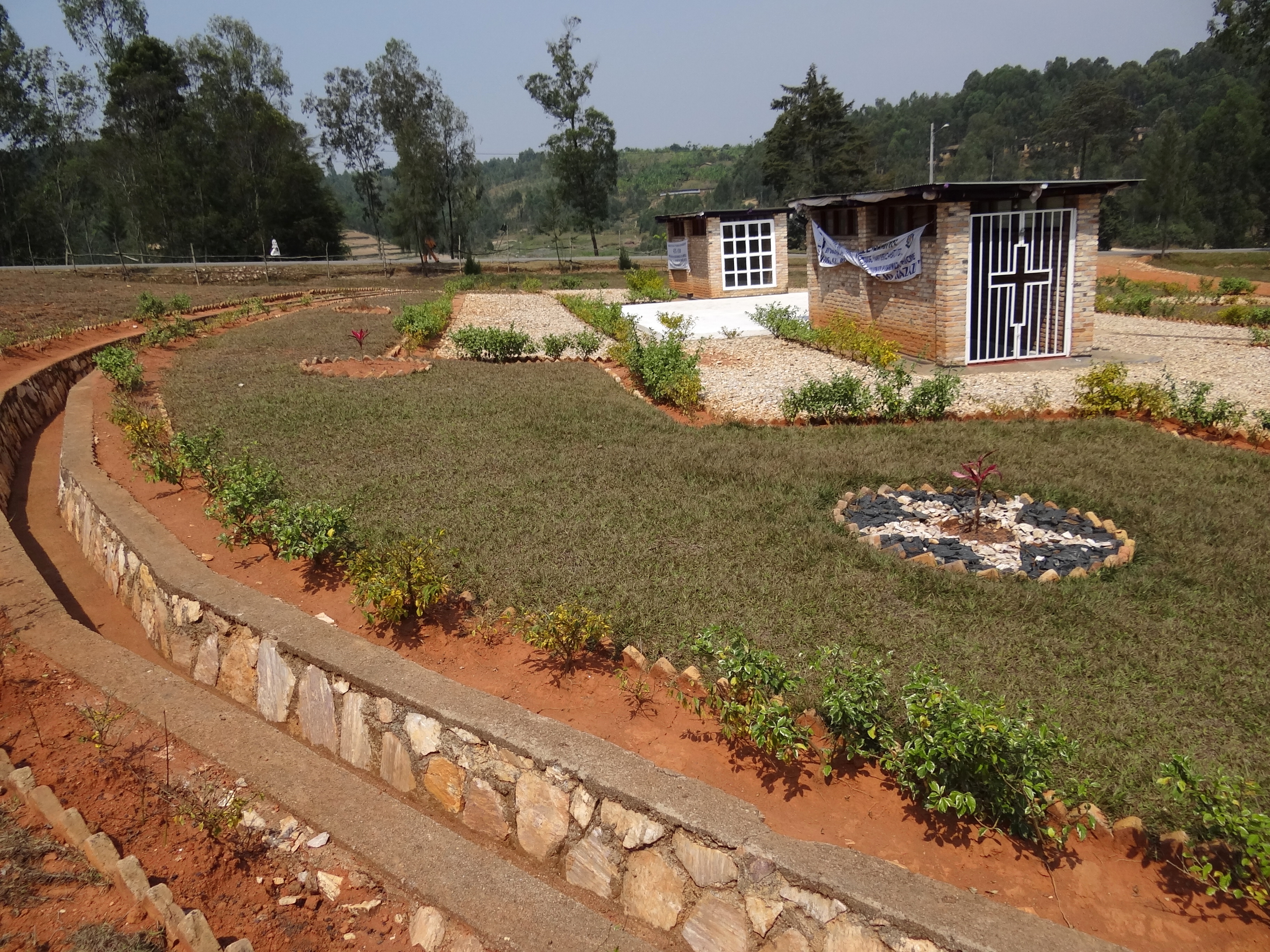
Genocide memorial where 6,000 are buried in a mass grave beside the hospital

The appeal was too late. The government troops and the Interahamwe Hutu paramilitaries perpetuated mass killings before fleeing from the RPF, which took control of Kabgayi on 2 June 1994. Early reports by clergymen said that relatively few people had died – perhaps 1,500 out of 30,000. However, a February 2009 report by eighteen Gacaca court judges said that at least 64,000 refugees had been killed. Many of the victims were buried alive. Red Cross workers and local clergy were reportedly complicit in the killing. (Note: Follow-up trials were held of individuals alleged to have been involved. The Gacaca trials were officially ended on 16 June 2012.)

After the RPF took control, on 5 June 1994 Archbishop Vincent Nsengiyumva, Bishops Thaddée Nsengiyumva and Joseph Ruzindana, and ten other priests were killed at Gakurazo, just south of Kabgayi. The killers were reportedly Tutsi soldiers who were guarding them. The RPF said the soldiers thought the priests had been involved in the earlier killings of Tutsis. The Pope deplored the murders. The priest and journalist André Sibomana said that the RPF later killed "hundreds" of peasants at Kabgayi on 19 June 1994.

Following the massacres of 1994, the Kabgayi and Byumba dioceses, helped by Catholic Relief Services and then by the U.S. Bureau of Population, Refugees and Migration, began to organize gatherings to help youth understand what had happened, why and how to prevent such events being repeated. The programs were open to all. 30% of the youths in the three Kabgayi test camps were not Roman Catholics.

== Institutions ==
Kabgayi today remains home to the Cathedral Basilica of The Immaculate Conception (Beatae Immaculatae Virginis), a spacious redbrick building erected in 1923. The consecration ceremony in April 1923 was attended by many colonial administrators and by King Musinga, drawing a large crowd of local people. The Belgian colonial rulers also made Kabgayi the location of a hospital and training schools for midwives, printers, carpenters and blacksmith and other trades. There is a small museum with an exhibit of artifacts from different periods. Kabgayi is also the location of the National Inter-diocesan Major Seminary of Kabgayi (The cycle of Philosophy), St. André Pastoral Center, St. Joseph School and St. Elizabeth Nurse and Midwives College. As of 2013 the Kabgayi District Hospital was suffering from staff shortages, resulting in large queues of patients.

== Gallery ==
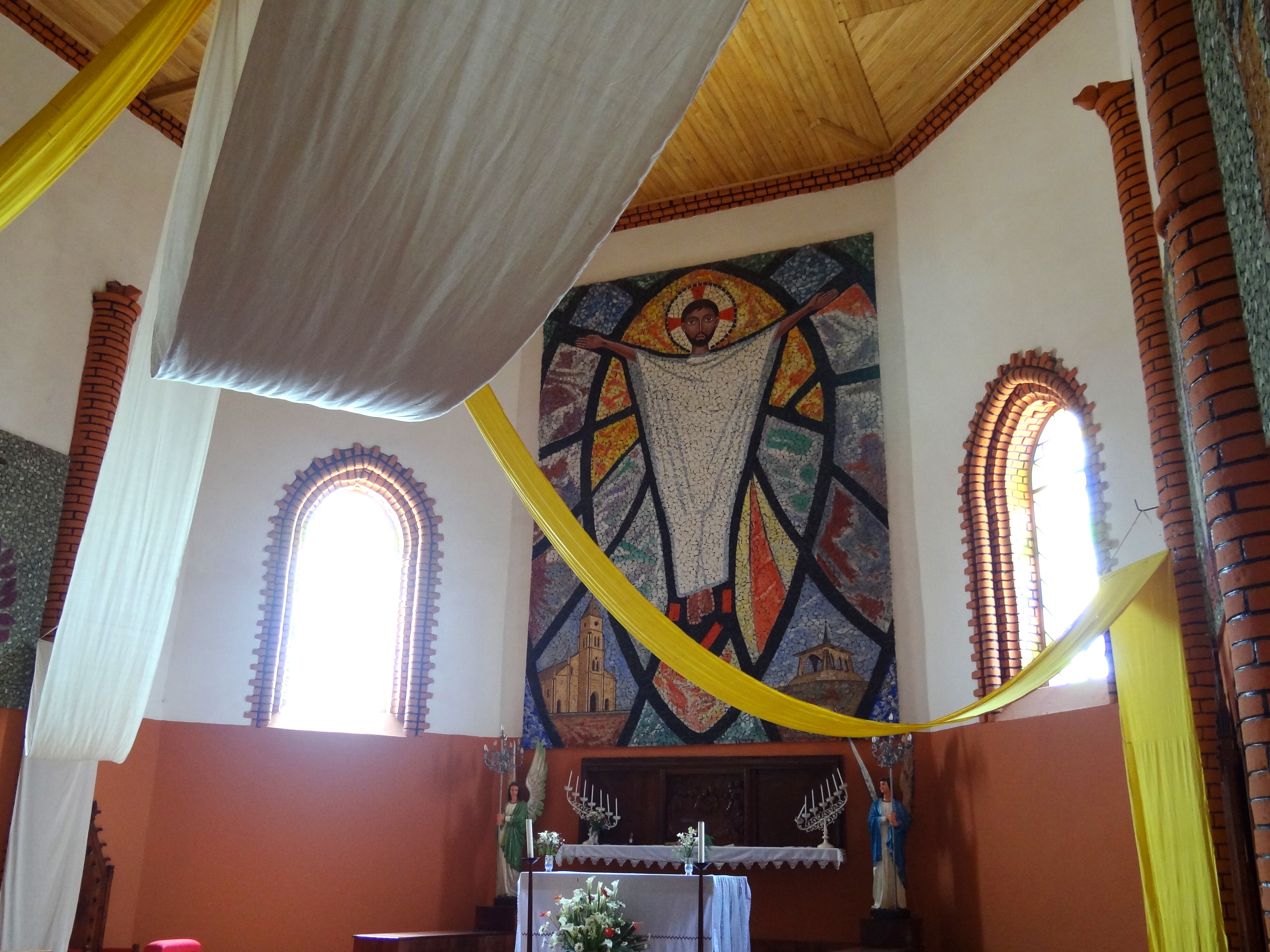
Altar Backdrop – Cathedral Basilica of Our Lady at Kabgayi

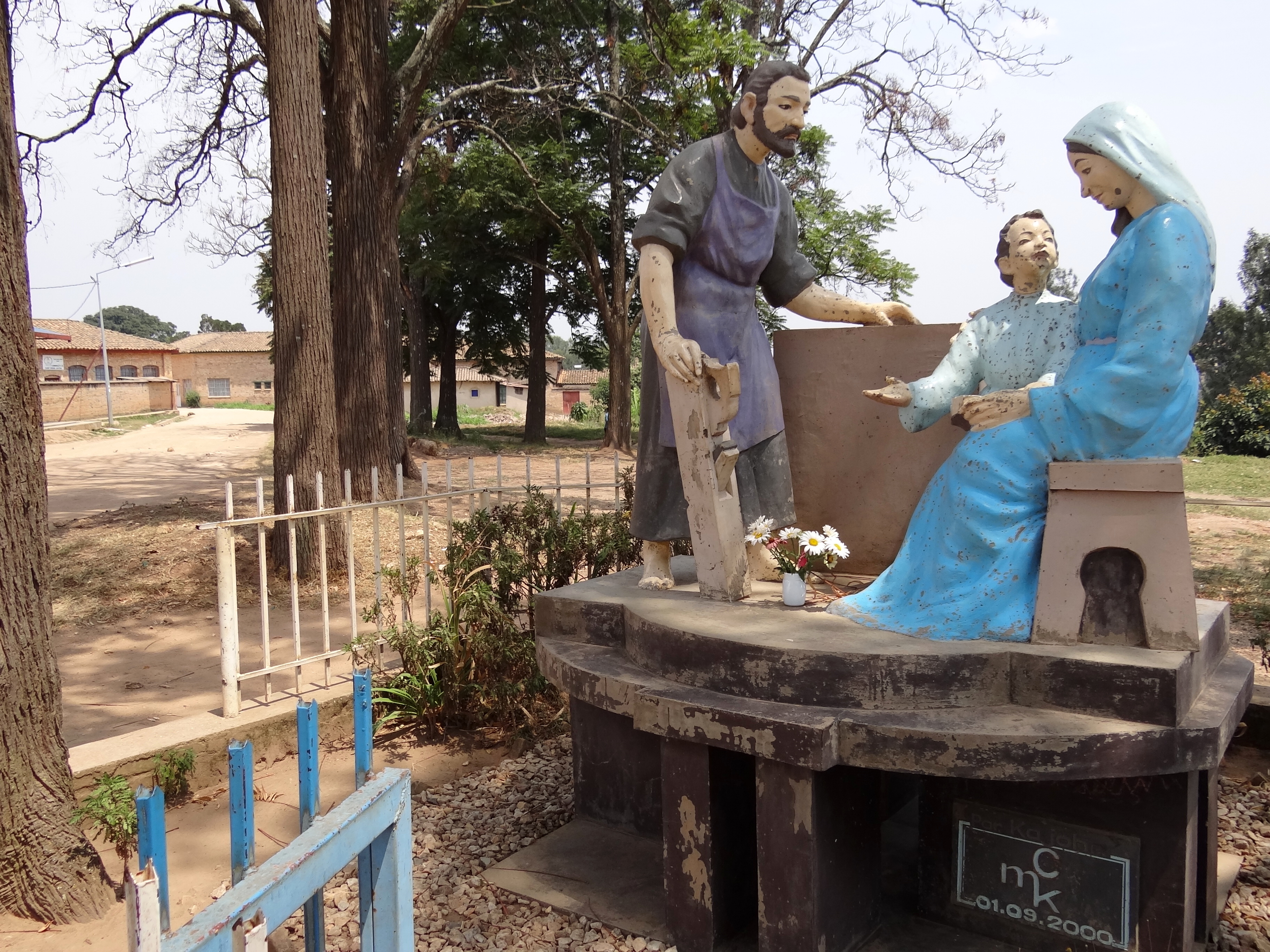
Catholic Statuary at Kabgayi Cathedral

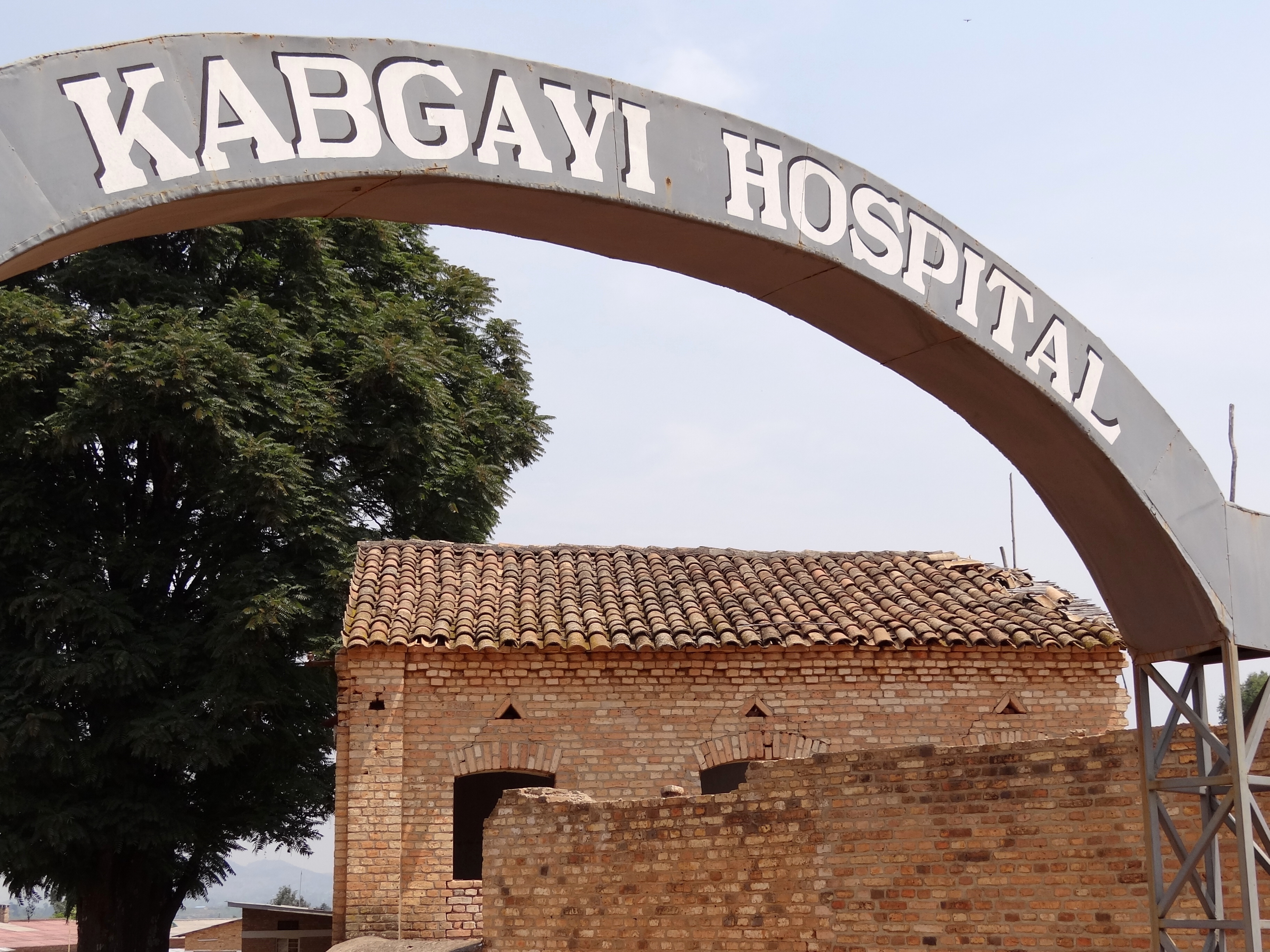
Sign with Colonial-Era Building – Kabgayi Hospital

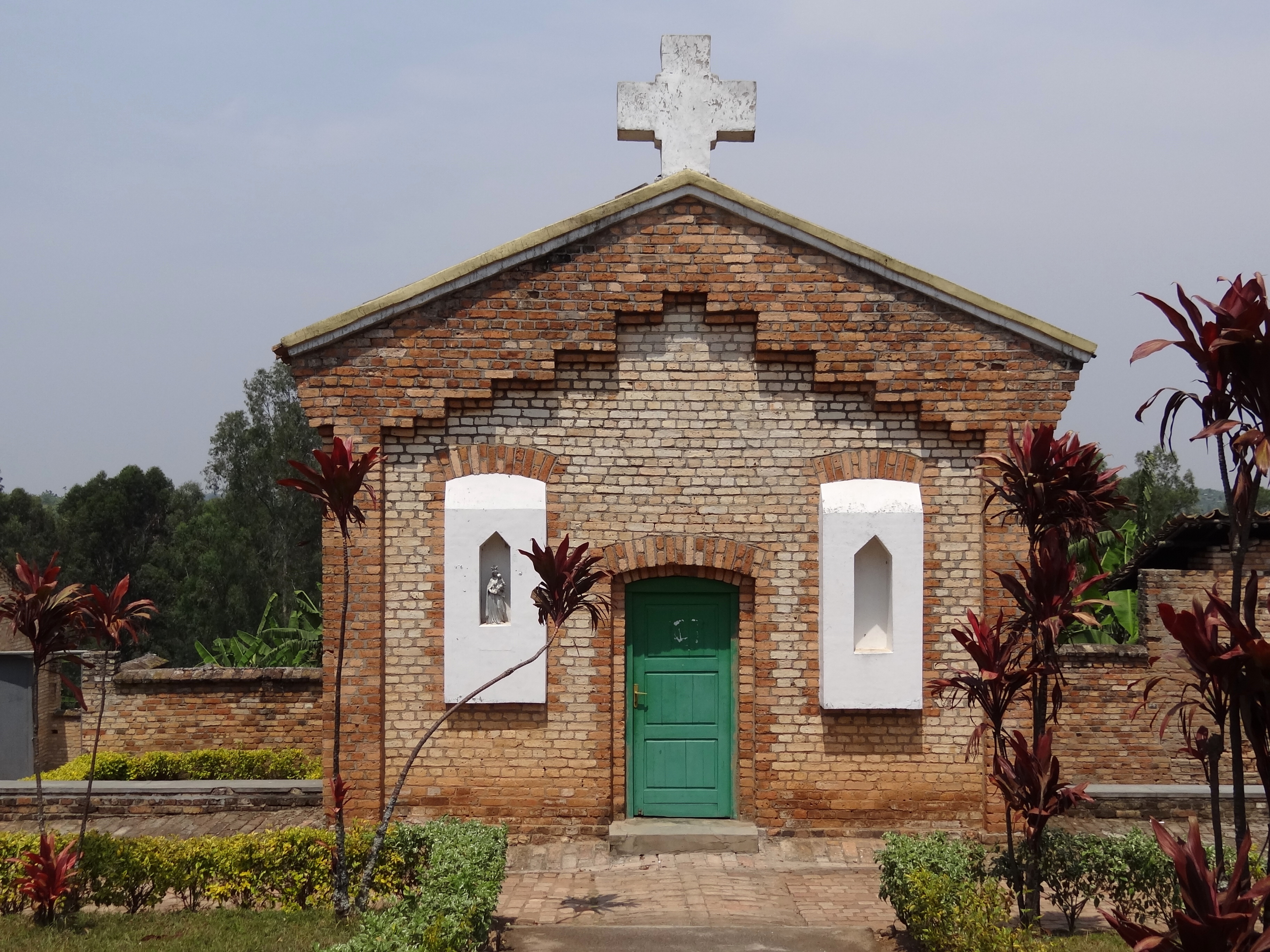
Chapel on Hospital Grounds – Kabgayi Hospital
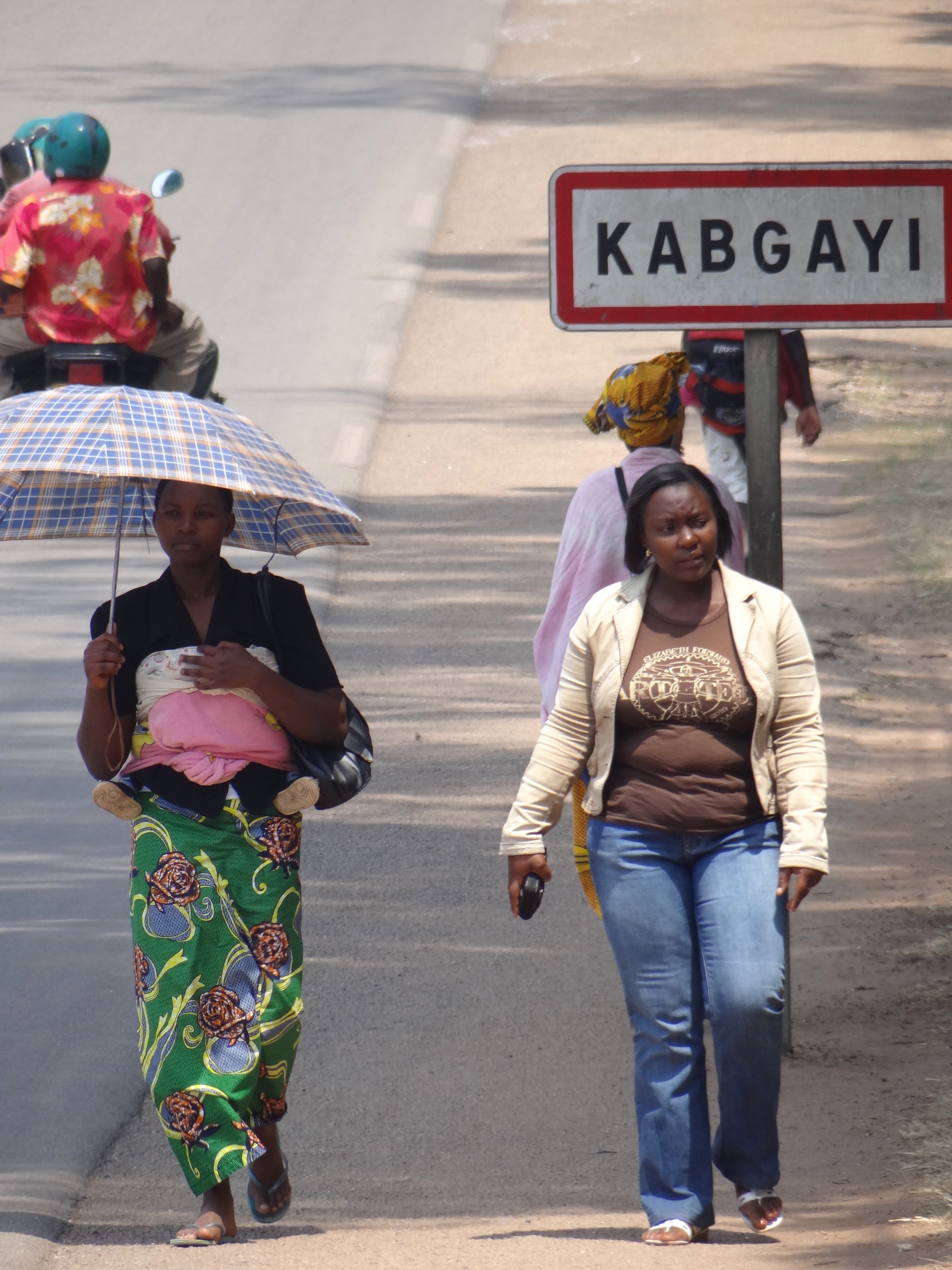
Street Scene near Kabgayi Cathedral

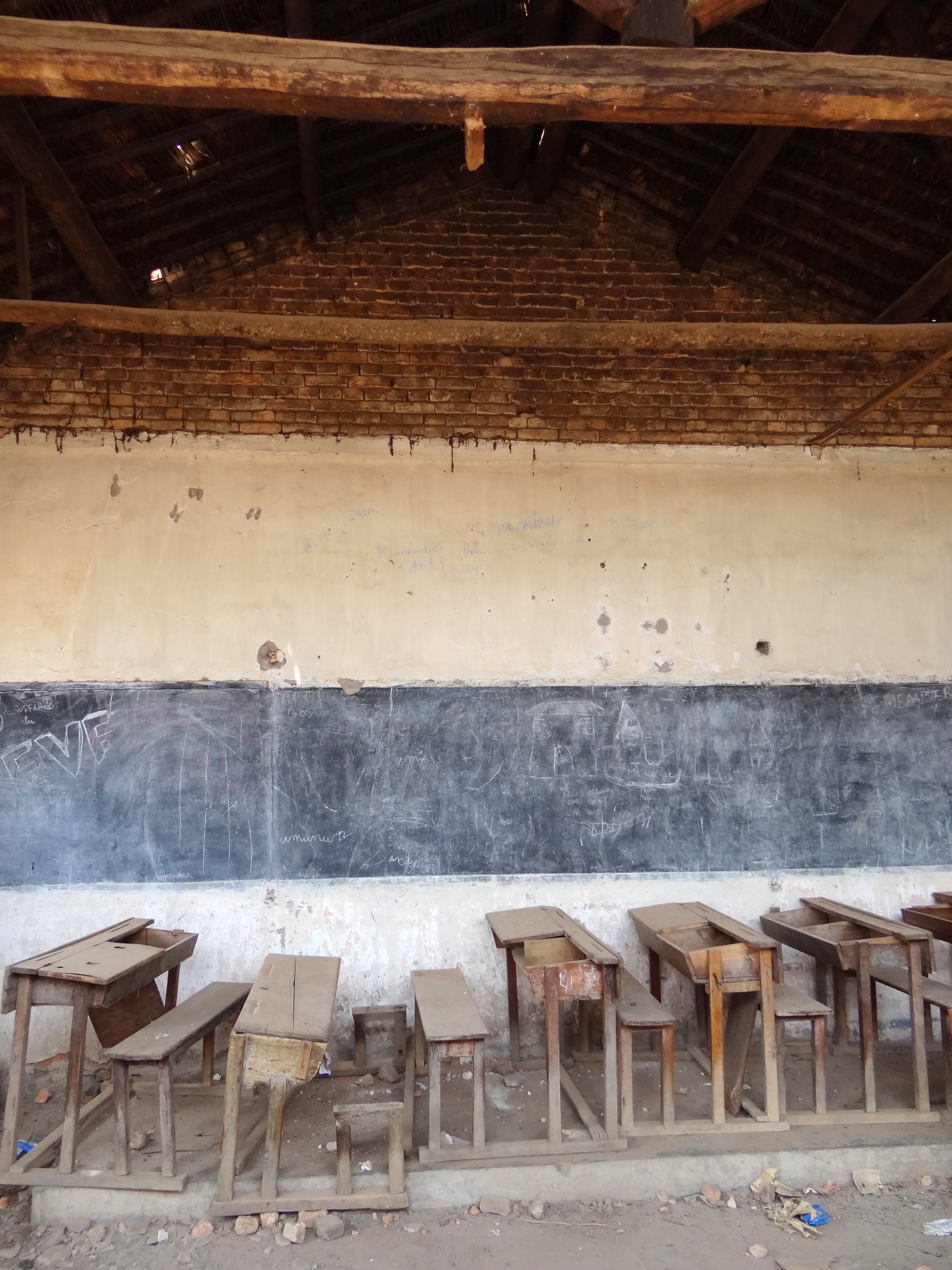
Burnt-out schoolroom at Kabgayi Hospital

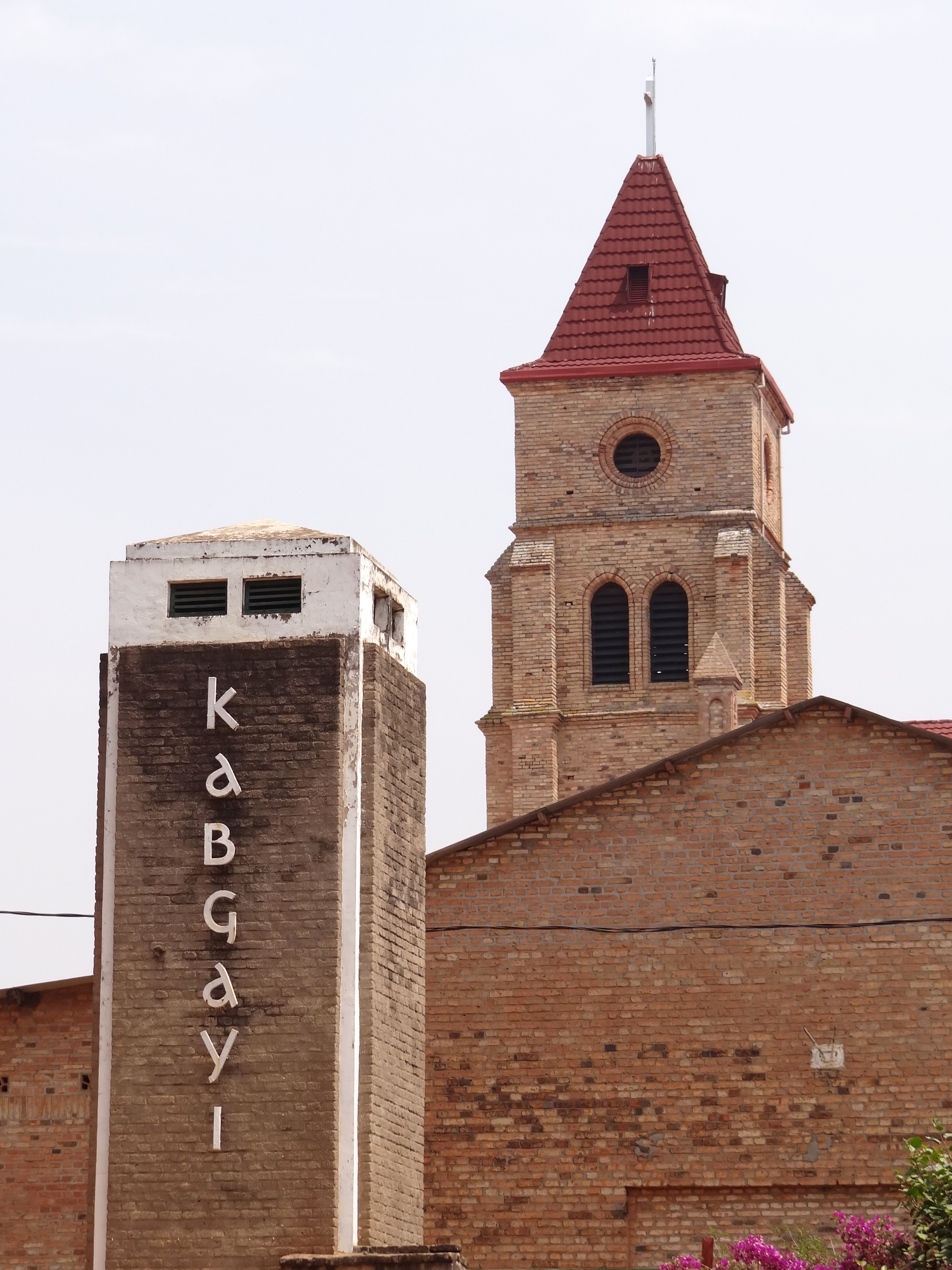
Cathedral Basilica of Our Lady at Kabgayi

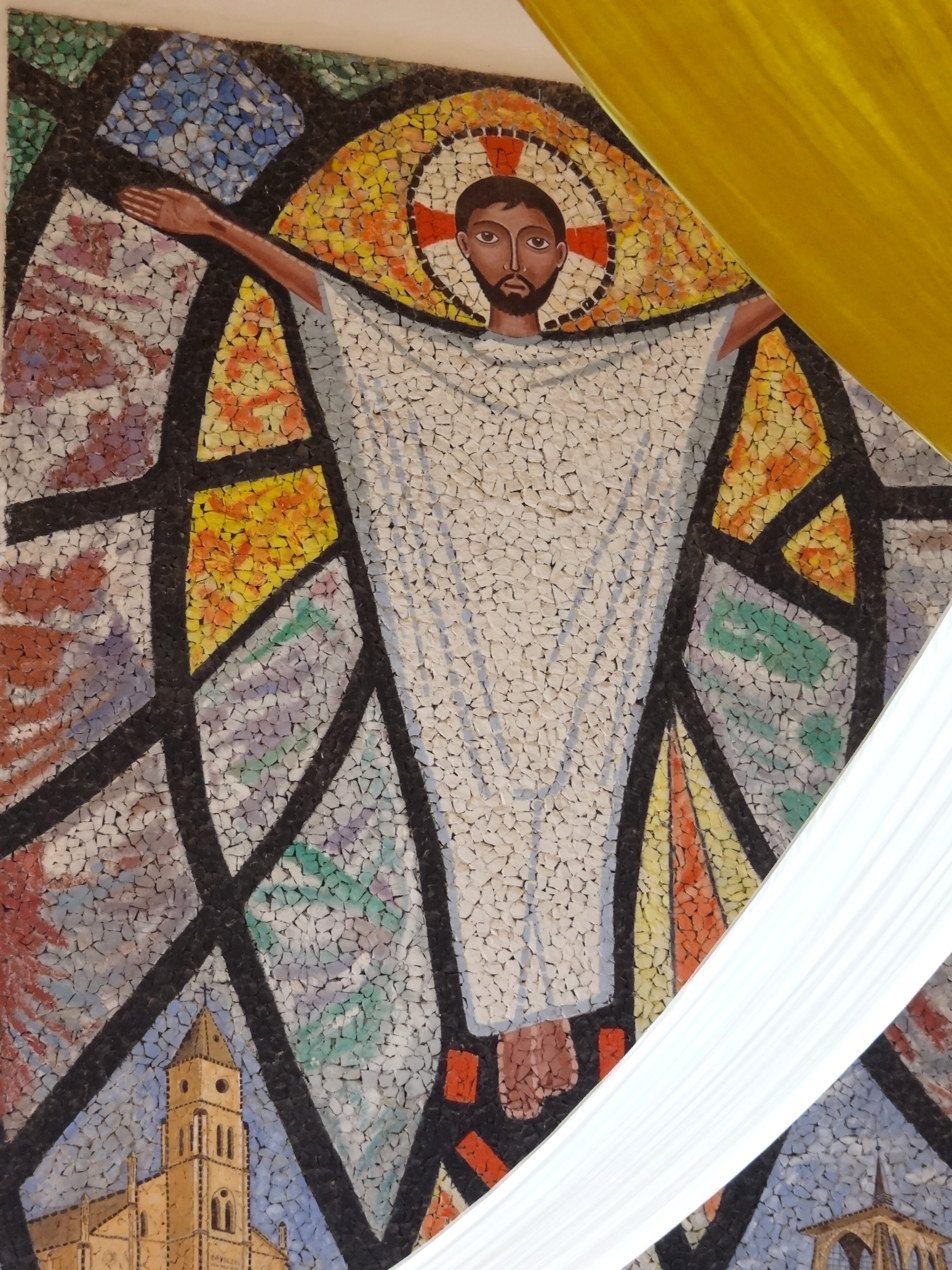
Mosaic Design of Christ with Sashes – Cathedral Basilica of Our Lady at Kabgayi
