= Došen =

Došen may refer to:

== Places ==
- Došen Dabar, an uninhabited settlement in Croatia
- Došen Duliba, an uninhabited settlement in Croatia

== People ==
- Marko Došen (1859–1944), Croatian writer and politician
- Drago Došen (1943–2019), Serbian artist
- Vid Došen (1719–1778), Croatian poet

== See also ==
- Stephanie Dosen, American singer-songwriter
- Phillip "ImperialHal" Dosen, American gamer
- Dōsen Station, a railway station
- Dozen (disambiguation)
