= Špansko =

Neighbourhood in Zagreb, Croatia

Coordinates: 45°48′N 15°54′E

- Urban settlement of Zagreb
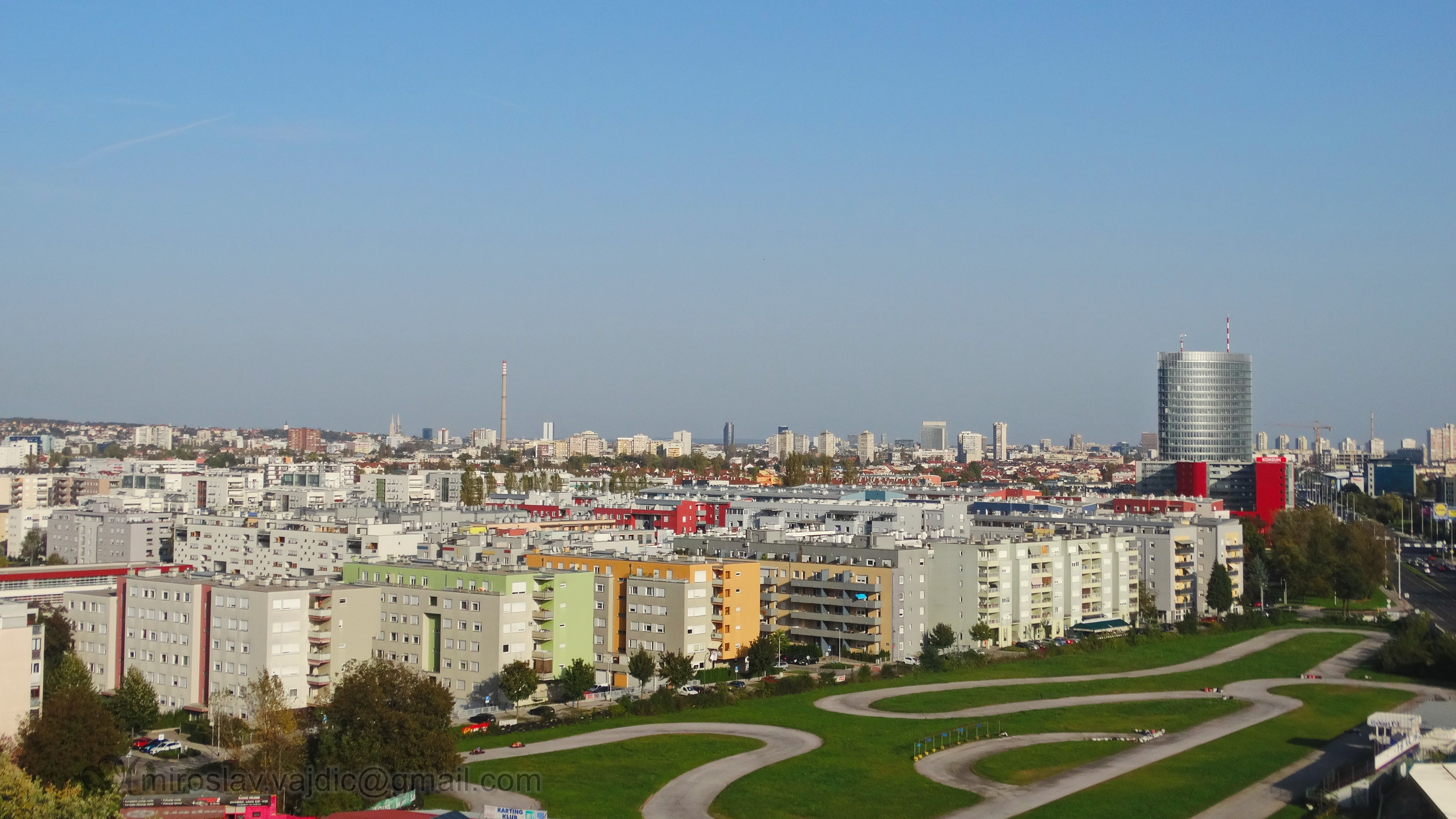
- South side of Špansko, Sky Office Tower behind
- Interactive map of Špansko
- Country: Croatia
- City: Zagreb
- City district: Stenjevec

Area
  - Total: 0.8502 km^{2} (0.3283 sq mi)

Population (2011)
  - Total: 24,241
  - Density: 28,510/km^{2} (73,850/sq mi)

Špansko is a neighbourhood in the western part of Zagreb, Croatia. It has about 24,000 inhabitants. It belongs to Stenjevec district.

Špansko consists of two parts (two independent local councils), Špansko-sjever (Špansko North) and Špansko-jug (Špansko South) which are separated by Antun Šoljan Street.

There are two Catholic parishes in Špansko: parish of Our Lady of Sorrows and Ivan Merz.

Postal code of the neighbourhood is 10090.

== Etymology ==
The name Špansko derives from the word špan, that in Duchy of Pannonian Croatia and later during the Croatian history (especially of the medieval period) noted nobleman's or municipal (općina's) tax-collector among serfs. The word is of Croatian origin (župan > žpan), but was modified by both Hungarian (ispan) and Croatian language (ispan > span > špan). Špansko is administrative area of a certain špan, his tax-collecting area.

The first known toponym of Špansko is Lonka (1242), which was later modified into Lonka Superior ("Upper Lonka", 1346). The first mention of the "Špansko" is Lwka Špani toponym from the year of 1598.

== Population ==
Year	Population
1931	384
1961	3,297
1971	10,675
2011	24,241

Tituš Brezovački Elementary school has the greatest number of pupils in Zagreb.

== Culture ==
Špansko is known as a "neighbourhood of Croatian poets and warriors" due to its street naming, dominantly by poets and writers (Dragutin Domjanić, Josip Pupačić, Vid Došen, Antun Šoljan, Drago Gervais), as well as Croatian brigades from Homeland War. Špansko has three elementary schools (Ante Kovačić, Tituš Brezovački and Špansko Oranice Elementary school), two of which are named by noted Croatian writers. The central square in the neighbourhood is named after Ivan Kukuljević Sakcinski with the Park of the Croatian volunteers (defenders) of the Homeland War.

Ivanka Brađašević worked as a librarian in the Ante Kovačić Elementary school.

There are two public libraries, each in one of the two local councils.

== Sport ==
The football club NK Špansko was successful in the 1980s and 1990s.

Croatian female handball player Klaudija Bubalo attended Ante Kovačić elementary school, where she started playing handball at physical education classes. Vedran Zrnić attended the same school as well.

== Literature ==
- Alajbeg, Trpimir (2015). 40 godina Župe Blažene Djevice Marije Žalosne Špansko [40 years of the Our Lady of Sorrows Parish Špansko] (in Croatian). Zagreb: Denona. ISBN 978-953-98356-1-1.
- Španček - ljetopis OŠ Ante Kovačića [Španček - yearbook of Ante Kovačić Elementary school] (in Croatian). Zagreb: Školska knjiga. 2004.
