= Dozen (disambiguation) =

Dozen or dozens are groupings of twelve.

Dozen or Dozens may also refer to:

- The Dozens, a contest common among African Americans where participants insult each other
- "The Dozens" (Black-ish), an episode of the television series Black-ish

== See also ==
- Baker's dozen (disambiguation)
- Dirty Dozen (disambiguation)
