= Chaplet of the Seven Sorrows =

Rosary-based Christian prayer

The Chaplet of the Seven Sorrows, also known as the Rosary of the Seven Sorrows or the Servite Rosary, is a Rosary based prayer that originated with the Servite Order. It is often said in connection with the Seven Dolours of Mary.

It is a chaplet consisting of a ring of seven groups of seven beads separated by a small medal depicting one of the sorrows of Mary, or a single bead. A further series of three beads and a medal are also attached to the chain (before the first "sorrow") and these are dedicated to prayer in honour of Mary's Tears, as well as to indicate the beginning of the chaplet. Conventionally the beads are of black wood or some other black material indicating sorrow. It has also been called the Seven Swords Rosary referring to the prophecy of Simeon:

"Behold this child is set for the fall, and for the resurrection of many in Israel, and for a sign which shall be contradicted; and thy own soul a sword shall pierce, that, out of many hearts, thoughts may be revealed." - (Lk.2:34-35)

It received approval through the grant of indulgences by Pope Benedict XII, Pope Clement XII, and Pope Clement XIII.

== History ==
This devotion to the Our Sorrowful Mother was originated in the thirteenth century, when seven professional men from Florence, which was an important commercial center of Europe, were influenced by the penitential spirit common to the Brothers of Penance with whom they were in close contact. In 1240 they withdrew from the world to pray and serve the Lord, leading a life of penance, prayer and service to Mary. Because of so many visitors, they retreated again to Monte Senario, where they formed the Servite Order. By 1244, under the direction of Peter of Verona, they began to wear a religious habit similar to the Dominicans and began to live under the Rule of Saint Augustine. The Servites devoted their prayer to the rosary of the Seven Sorrows. The choice of the number was derived from the symbolic value of the number seven, suggesting fullness, completeness, and abundance. Consequently, only the principal sorrows are listed.

The chaplet recalls the Sorrows the Virgin Mother of God endured in compassion for the suffering and death of her Divine Son. The Seven Sorrows are taken from events in Scripture. Before Pope Pius VII's formal approval, the Servite Order had permission in 1668 to celebrate the Feast of the Seven Dolors because the Order was instrumental in popularizing the Seven Sorrows Devotion. Members of the Servite Order actively promoted the Chaplet of the Seven Sorrows during the time of the Black Death (1347-1351).

== Meditation methods ==
Methods of praying the chaplet vary. This devotion may be spread over a week, commemorating one sorrow each day, or it may be prayed as whole in a single day.

A method provided by the 1866 version of "The Raccolta" is shown below. The recitation begins with the sign of the cross and an Act of contrition. Each sorrow is announced, (and in some versions of the recitation, a meditative prayer is said, or a segment from the Hymn Stabat Mater Dolorosa). Then on the separate bead an Our Father is said, followed by a Hail Mary for each of the seven beads. Some then close the septet of Hail Marys with a brief invocation to Our Lady of Sorrows (Commonly: "Sorrowful and Immaculate Heart of Mary pray for us"), or a Glory Be. The next sorrow is then announced, and carried out in the same manner until all seven have been meditated upon. The three Hail Marys dedicated to her tears are said and then a closing prayer is said. The most commonly known or traditional closing prayer in the English speaking world is the following:

V. Pray for us, O most sorrowful Virgin.
R. That we may be made worthy of the promises of Christ.

Let us pray.

Lord Jesus, we now implore, both for the present and for the hour of our death, the intercession of the most Blessed Virgin Mary, Thy Mother, whose holy soul was pierced at the time of Thy passion by a sword of grief. Grant us this favor, O Saviour of the world, Who liveth and reigneth with the Father and the Holy Ghost, forever and ever. Amen.

== Our Lady of Kibeho ==
Between 1981 and 1989, in Kibeho, Rwanda, three local schoolgirls reported seeing the Virgin Mary who identified herself to them as Nyina wa Jambo (Kinyarwanda for “Mother of the Word”).

On March 6, 1982, according to Marie-Claire Mukangango, one of the three approved visionaries, the Virgin Mary taught her the Rosary of the Seven Sorrows and entrusted her with the mission to spread it throughout the world. All the apparitions to Marie Claire included the recitation and meditation of the Rosary of the Seven Sorrows. After research, the Church investigation commissions have not found any evidence that Marie Claire knew this rosary before the beginning of the apparitions.

Marie Claire also reported that the Virgin Mary gave her revelations about the Rosary of the Seven Sorrows and explained to her the graces associated with it. On May 31, 1982, Marie Claire said that the Virgin Mary promised that anyone who recites the Rosary of the Seven Sorrows while meditating would find "the strength to repent", along with other graces. Mukangango quoted the Virgin as saying:

“One must meditate on the Passion of Jesus, and on the deep sorrows of His Mother. One must recite the Rosary every day, and also the Rosary of the Seven Sorrows of Mary, to obtain the favour of repentance.”

The other graces associated with the recitation of Rosary of the Seven Sorrows are sometimes summarized as follows:

1. With the recitation of the Seven Sorrows Rosary, the hardest hearts shall change, if you pray it for yourself or for others.
2. By the recitation of the Seven Sorrows Rosary, you shall be freed from obsessions and addiction.
3. This rosary when said from the heart, it will win us true repentance of our sins and free our souls from guilt and remorse.
4. Those who say it often shall obtain clear understanding of their weaknesses and flaws causing them to sin and those things we don’t like about ourselves and thought were a part of our character, shall change.
5. You shall obtain whatever you ask for through this rosary, praying this rosary from the heart.

On July 2, 2001, the Holy See released a declaration by Augustin Misago, Bishop of Gikongoro, on Marian apparitions that took place in 1981-83 in Kibeho, Rwanda indicating that they were “worthy of belief”.

== See also ==
- Our Lady of Kibeho
- Our Lady of Sorrows
