= Our Lady of Kibeho =

Marian apparitions

Coordinates: 2°38′S 29°33′E

Our Lady of Kibeho Our Lady of Sorrows of Kibeho
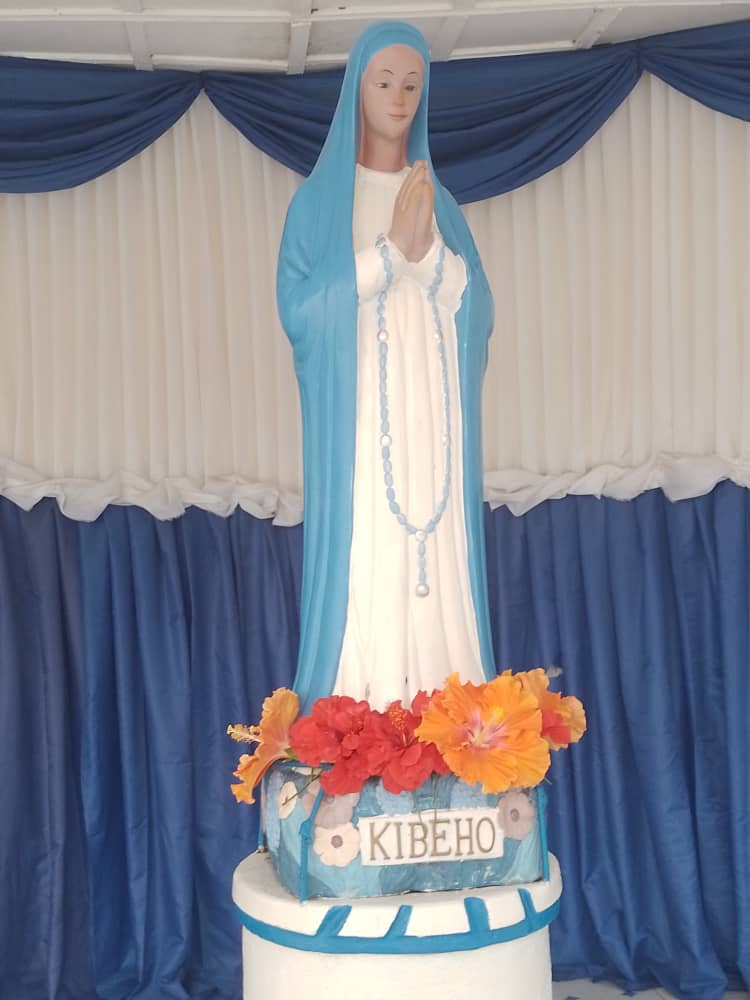
- Our Lady of Sorrows, title under which the Virgin Mary presented herself at Kibeho.
- Location: Kibeho, Rwanda, Africa
- Date: The first apparition was 28 November 1981
- Witness: Alphonsine Mumureke; Nathalie Mukamazimpaka; Marie Claire Mukangango
- Type: Marian apparition
- Approval: 29 June 2001; Bishop Augustin Misago; Diocese of Gikongoro
- Shrine: Sanctuary of Our Lady of Kibeho, Rwanda
- Feast day: 28 November

Our Lady of Kibeho (Kinyarwanda: Bikira Mariya w'Ikibeho, French: Notre-Dame de Kibeho), also known as Our Lady of Sorrows of Kibeho, is a Catholic title of the Virgin Mary, mother of Jesus, based on the Marian apparitions reported in the 1980s by several adolescents in Kibeho, south-western Rwanda. The young approved visionaries were Alphonsine Mumureke, Nathalie Mukamazimpaka and Marie Claire Mukangango.

The Kibeho apparitions apparently communicated various messages to the schoolgirls, including an apocalyptic vision of Rwanda descending into violence and hatred, possibly foretelling the 1994 Rwandan genocide.

In 2001, the local bishop of the Catholic Church officially recognised the visions of the first three schoolgirls as authentic. The Holy See also released the declaration of Augustin Misago, Bishop of Gikongoro, approving the apparitions.

== Marian apparitions ==
Kibeho is a small village located in southwestern Rwanda. The reported apparitions began on November 28, 1981, at a time of increasing tension between the Tutsi and Hutu groups. They occurred at a Catholic boarding school, the Kibeho College, a secondary school for girls. The first visionary was Alphonsine Mumureke who claimed to see a beautiful Lady who identified herself as Nyina wa Jambo (Kinyarwanda for “Mother of the Word”), which was synonymous with Umubyeyi W'Imana ("Mother of God").

Her testimony was first received with mixed opinions and much skepticism. Some time later, two new visionaries started claiming to see the Virgin Mary at the College in alignment with Alphonsine: Nathalie Mukamazimpaka on January 12, 1982, and Marie Claire Mukangango on March 2, 1982.

The longest series of visions were attributed to Alphonsine Mumureke, who had received the initial vision shortly after her admittance into Kibeho College in October 1981. On March 20, 1982, Alphonsine Mumureke reported experiencing a "mystical journey" with the Virgin Mary during several hours, through symbolic representations of spiritual realities such as hell, purgatory, and heaven. A similar experience was later reported by Nathalie Mukamazimpaka on October 30, 1982. The last apparition to her took place exactly eight years after the first one, on November 28, 1989.

Nathalie Mukamazimpaka was the next one to have visions, which lasted from January 1982 to December 3, 1983. Her visions emphasised endless prayer and expiation, with the Virgin even instructing Mukamazimpaka to perform penances through mortification of the flesh.

Marie Claire Mukangango, who had initially bullied Mumureke at school because of the visions, was the third one to experience an apparition on March 2, 1982. On March 6, 1982, according to her, the Virgin Mary taught her the (already extant) Chaplet of the Seven Sorrows, and entrusted her with the mission to spreading it throughout the world. On May 31, 1982, Marie Claire reported that the Virgin Mary gave her revelations about the Chaplet of the Seven Sorrows and explained to her the graces associated with it. The Virgin Mary reportedly promised that anyone who recites the Chaplet while meditating would find "the strength to repent" and obtain the favor of repentance, along with other graces. The last public apparitions of the Virgin Mary to Marie Claire were on September 15, 1982, the feast day of Our Lady of Sorrows.

On August 19, 1982, the three girls reported seeing a river of blood, people who killed one another, abandoned bodies with no one to bury them, a tree on fire, an open chasm, a monster, and severed heads. In 1994, this apocalyptic vision of Rwanda descending into violence and hatred began to be interpreted as a prophecy of the Rwandan genocide.

During his 1990 visit to Rwanda, Pope John Paul II visited Mbare, Kamonyi and Nyandungu. He exhorted the faithful to turn to the Virgin Mary as a "simple and sure guide" and to pray for greater commitment against local divisions, both political and ethnic.

=== Message of the apparitions ===
1. An urgent call to sincere repentance and the conversion of hearts.
2. An assessment of the bad moral state of the world.
3. The deep sorrow of the Mother of God.
4. The salvific value of suffering.
5. To pray unceasingly and with a sincere heart.
6. Regular prayer of the Rosary and Marian devotion.
7. The praying and the spreading of the Chapel of the Seven Sorrows.
8. A chapel to be built for Mary.
9. A call to pray for the Church.

=== Links with the Rwandan Genocide ===
In the 100 days that followed the April 6, 1994 assassination of dictator and President of Rwanda Juvénal Habyarimana, 800,000 to over a million Rwandans were slaughtered by their countrymen and, in some cases, their next-door neighbours. The Genocide was the culmination of intensifying animosity between Rwanda's principal communities, the Hutu and Tutsi, and the civil war that had preceded it. Kibeho itself was the site of two huge massacres: the first at the parish church in April 1994, and the second a year later when more than 5,000 refugees who had taken shelter there were shot by soldiers. The third seer, Marie Claire Mukangango, and her husband Elie Ntabadahiga, were trapped in Kigali and were among those who went missing in the April 1994 massacre.

=== Approved visionaries ===
Only the visions of the first three seers (Alphonsine Mumureke, Nathalie Mukamazimpaka, and Marie Clare Mukangango, aged 17, 20, and 21, respectively) received the solemn approval of Augustin Misago, Bishop of Gikongoro.

=== Unapproved visionaries ===
Others who claimed to have similar visions but are not recognised by the Catholic Church were Stephanie Mukamurenzi, Agnes Kamagaju, Vestine Salima, and Emmanuel Segastashya, the last of whom was previously a pagan and became a Christian evangelist. Segastashya's alleged visions included meeting Christ in a beanfield.

== Interpretation ==
The visions may be regarded as an ominous foreshadowing of the Rwandan genocide, and particularly the second Kibeho massacre in 1995. The school where the visions occurred became a place of slaughter during the Genocide, as dozens of children were shot and hacked to death by Hutu militants.

== Church approval ==
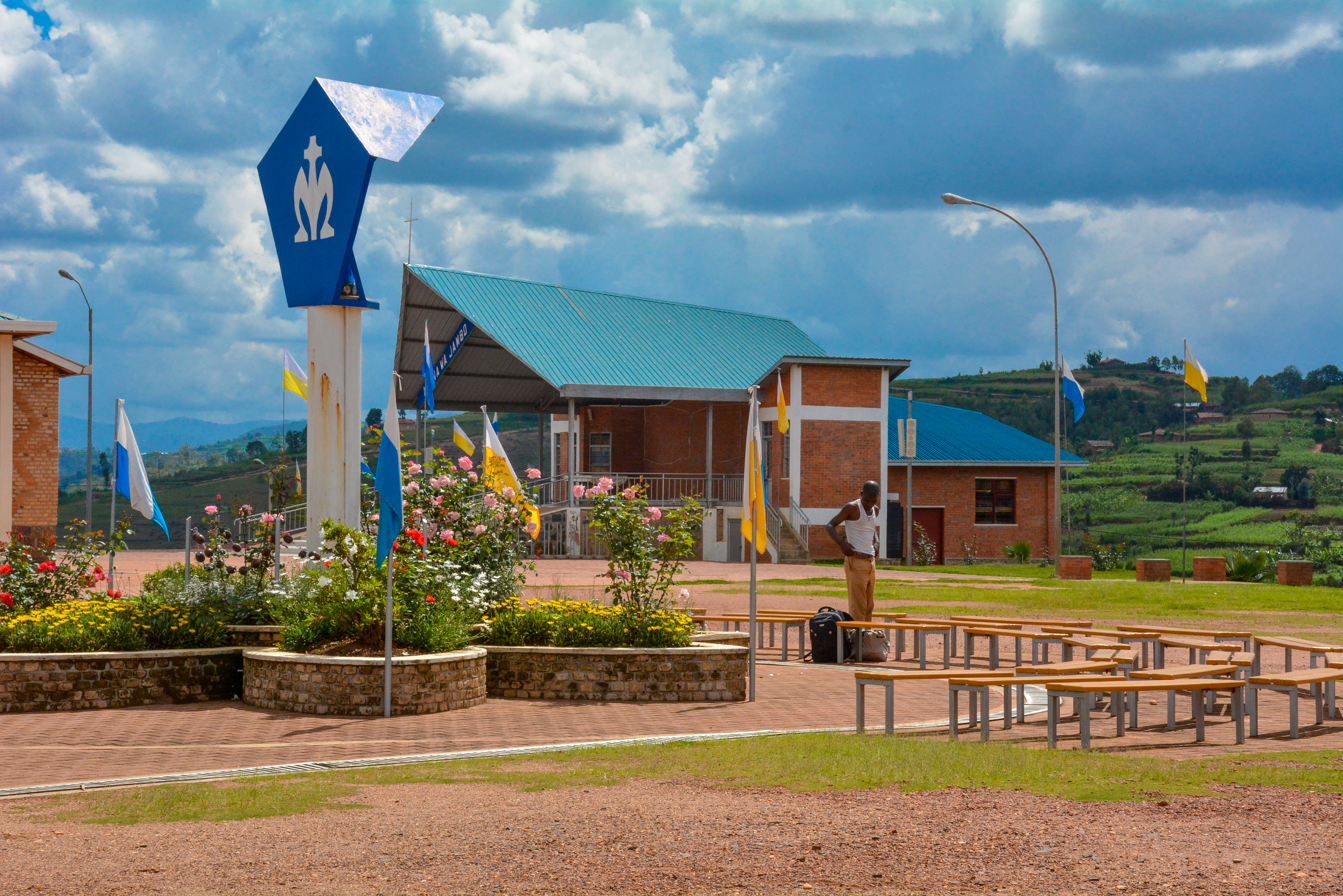
The Sanctuary of Our Lady of Kibeho, in Rwanda.

At the time of the apparitions, two separate investigation commissions were established by Bishop Jean Baptiste Gahamanyi, the Bishop of the Diocese of Butare to which Kibeho belonged at the time: a medical commission, on March 20, 1982 and a theological commission, on May 14, 1982.

On August 15, 1988, day of the Solemnity of the Assumption of Mary, Augustin Misago, the Bishop of Gikongoro, approved public devotion linked to the apparitions.

On June 29, 2001, Bishop Misago officially declared their authenticity. This is the first Vatican-approved Marian apparition that took place on the African continent. Bishop Misago was later accused in 1999 of involvement in the Rwandan Genocide, and acquitted on June 24 of the following year. On July 2, 2001, the Holy See also released the declaration of Bishop Misago approving the apparitions.

The feast day of Our Lady of Kibeho is on November 28, the anniversary of the first apparition to Alphonsine Mumureke in 1981.

== Marian shrine ==
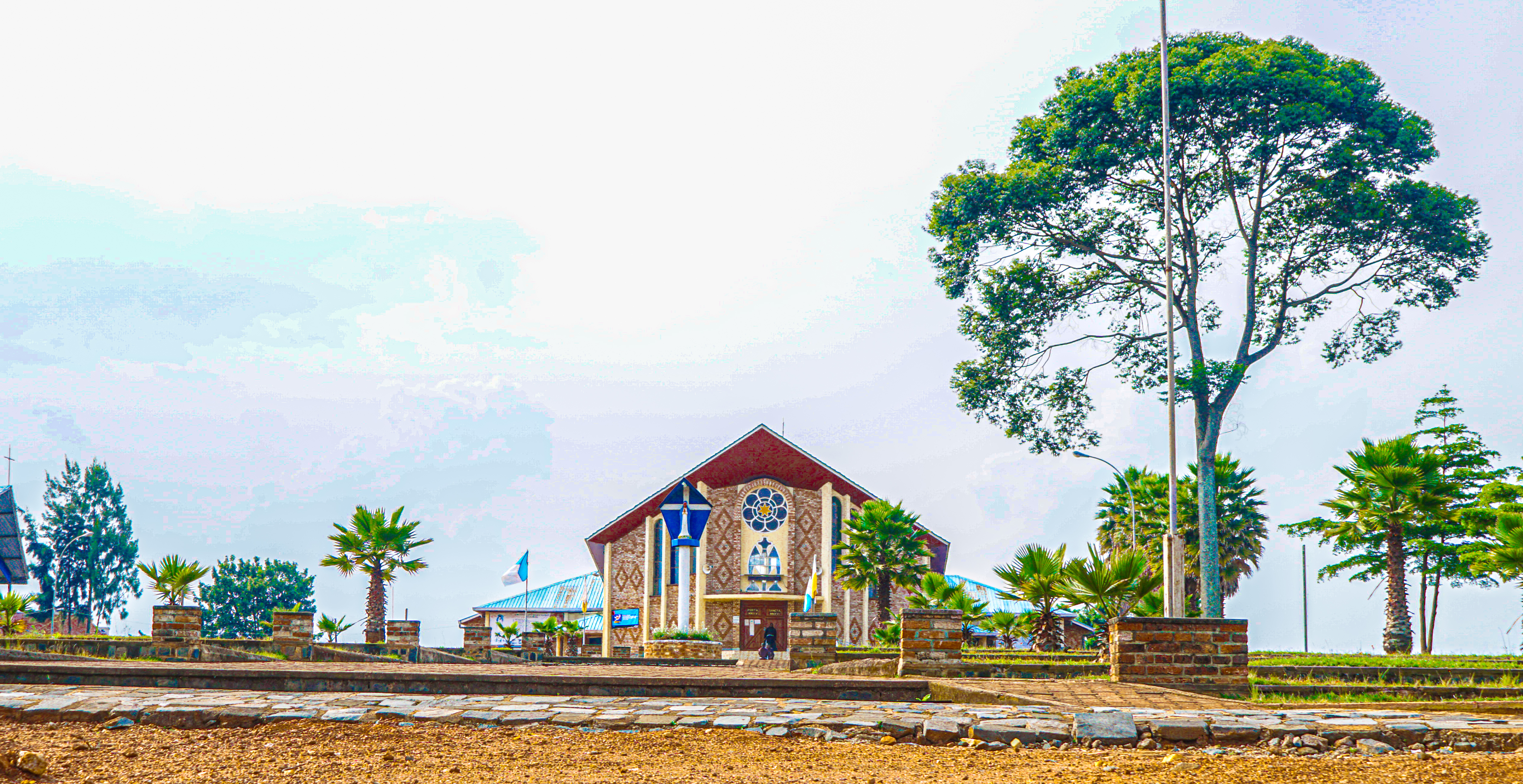
The Sanctuary of Our Lady of Kibeho, in Rwanda.

The Marian sanctuary at Kibeho was first named "Shrine of Our Lady of Sorrows" in 1992. The first stone was laid on November 28, 1992.

In a 2003 agreement between the local ordinary and the Society of the Catholic Apostolate (Pallotines), the rectorate of the Shrine of Our Lady of Kibeho is entrusted to the Pallotine Fathers. The rector is appointed by the local bishop and the Regional Pallottine Rector.

== Cultural references ==
American playwright Katori Hall dramatized the events surrounding the apparitions in Our Lady of Kibeho, produced in New York in 2014.

== See also ==
- Marian apparitions
- Our Lady of Sorrows
- Kibeho massacre
