= Our Lady of Sorrows =

Marian title

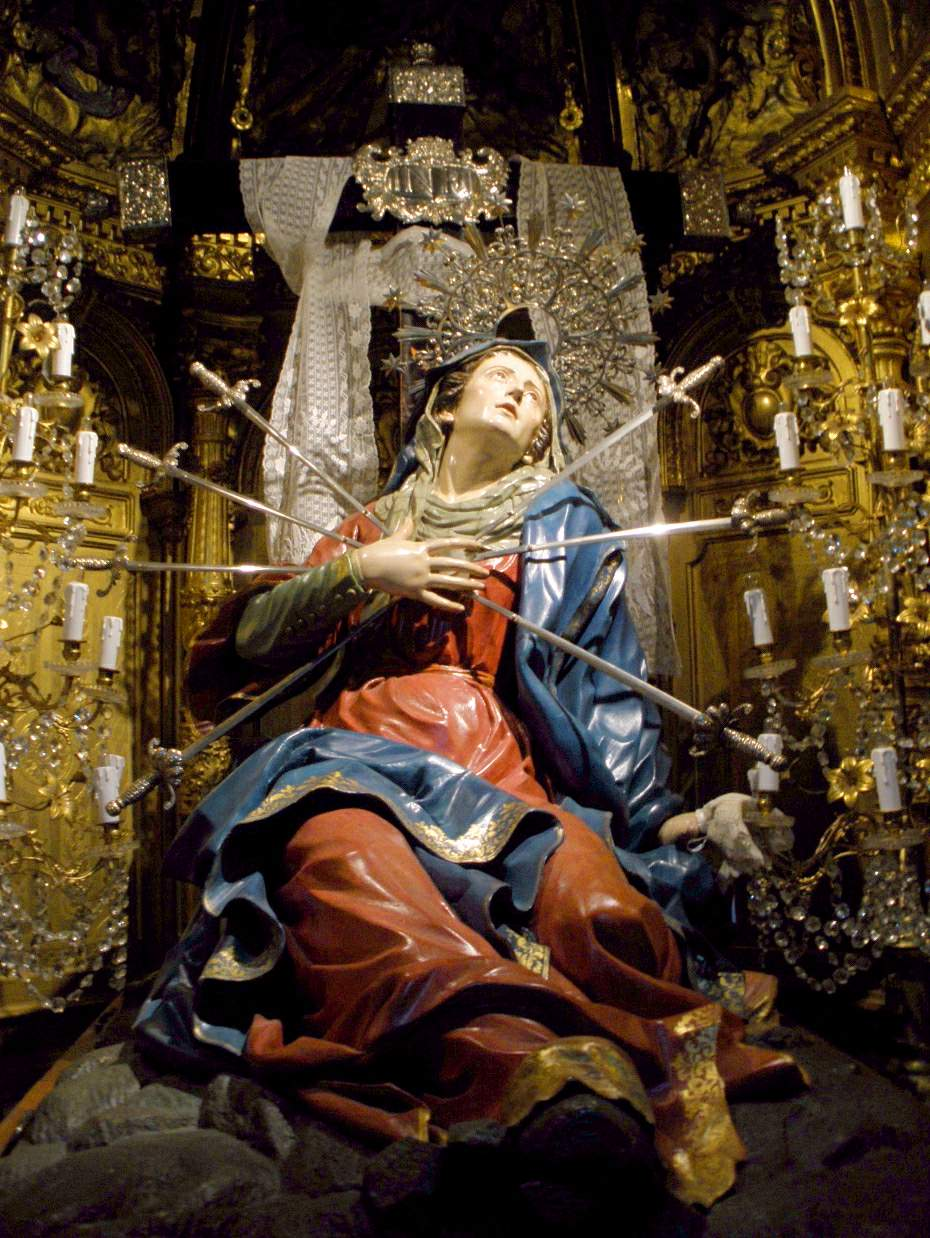
- Seven Swords Piercing the Sorrowful Heart of Mary in the Church of the Holy Cross, Salamanca, Spain
- Venerated in: Catholic Church; Eastern Orthodox Church
- Feast: 15 September
- Attributes: Blessed Virgin Mary in mournful state, tears, bleeding heart pierced by seven daggers
- Patronage: Caruaru, Pernambuco; Slovakia; Hungary; Poland; Capas, Tarlac; Malta; Mississippi; Ronda, Cebu; Tanauan, Batangas; Bustos, Bulacan; Dolores, Quezon; Pakil, Laguna; Molise, Italy

Our Lady of Sorrows (Latin: Beata Maria Virgo Perdolens), Our Lady of Dolours, Our Lady of the Agony, the Sorrowful Mother or Mother of Sorrows (Latin: Mater Dolorosa), and Our Lady of Piety, Our Lady of the Seven Sorrows or Our Lady of the Seven Dolours are names by which Mary, mother of Jesus, is referred to in relation to sorrows in life. As Mater Dolorosa, it is also a key subject for Marian art in the Catholic Church.

The Seven Sorrows of Mary are a popular religious theme and a Catholic devotion. In common imagery, the Virgin Mary is portrayed sorrowful and in tears, with one or seven swords piercing her heart, iconography based on the prophecy of Simeon in Luke 2:34–35. Pious practices in reference to this title include the Rosary of the Seven Sorrows, the Seven Principal Dolors of the Blessed Virgin, the Novena in Honor of the Seven Sorrows of Mary, and the Via Matris.

The feast of Our Lady of Sorrows is liturgically celebrated every 15 September, while the Friday of Sorrows is observed the Friday before Palm Sunday in some Catholic countries.

== Seven Sorrows of Mary ==
The Seven Sorrows (or Dolors/dolours) are events in the life of Mary that are a popular devotion and are frequently depicted in art.

These Seven Sorrows should not be confused with the five Sorrowful Mysteries of the Rosary.

Traditionally, the Seven Sorrows are (with some variations, using nearby episodes):

1. The Prophecy of Simeon in Luke 2, or the Circumcision of Jesus;
2. The Flight into Egypt in Matthew 2;
3. The Loss of the Child Jesus in the Temple of Jerusalem, also in Luke 2;
4. Mary meeting Jesus on the Via Dolorosa, the Fourth station of the Cross which can be found in Luke 23:27 (See John 19:25 for context);
5. The Crucifixion of Jesus on Mount Calvary in Matthew 27, Mark 15, Luke 23, and especially John 19;
6. Jesus's Descent from the Cross in Matthew 27, Mark 15, Luke 23, and John 19;
7. The Burial of Jesus by Joseph of Arimathea also in Matthew 27, Mark 15, Luke 23, and John 19.

== Devotions to the Seven Sorrows ==
=== Western Christianity ===
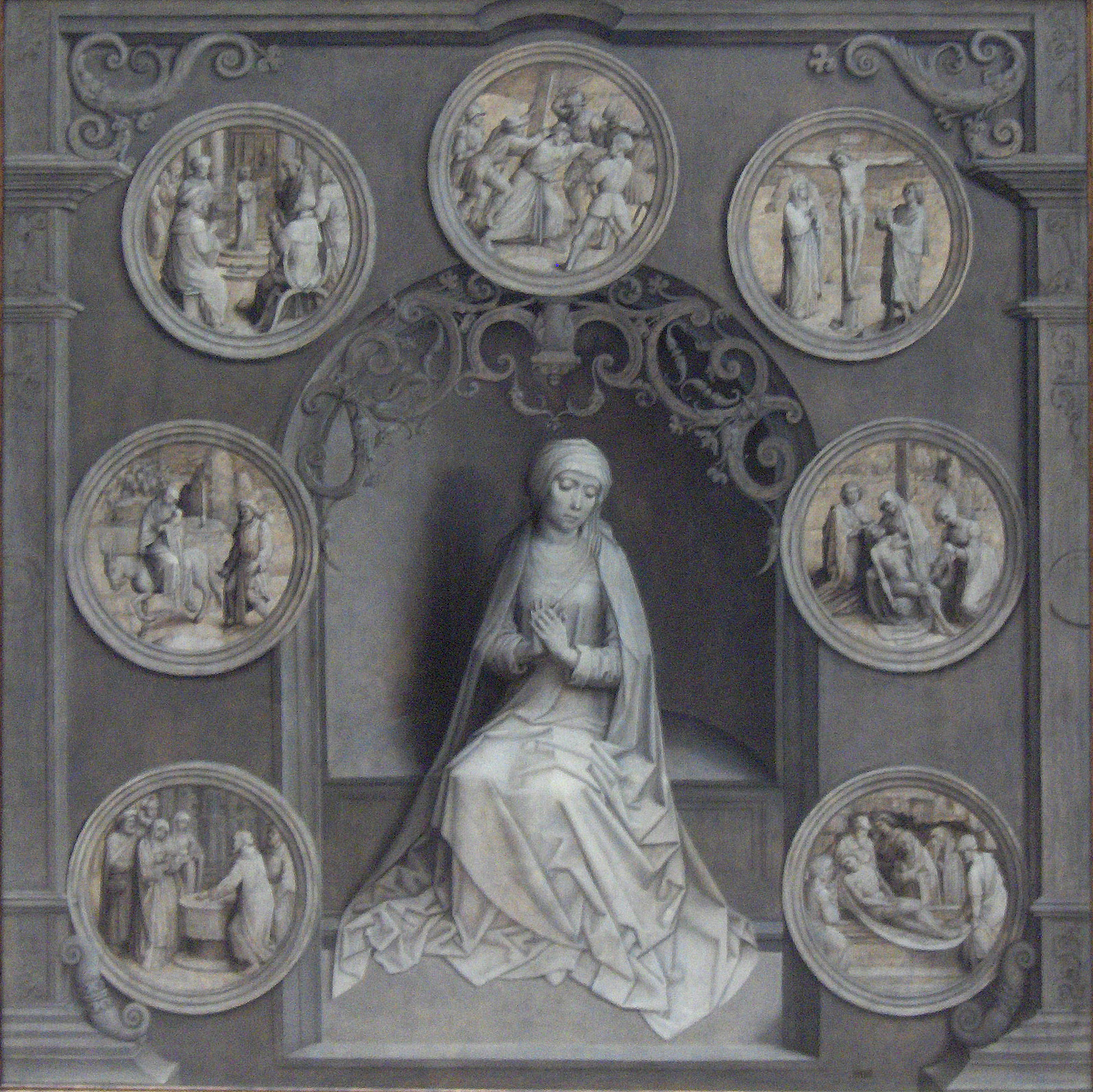
Mary surrounded by the Seven Sorrows

The Catholic devotion to Our Lady of Sorrows started to develop around the end of the 11th century, particularly in areas around the Mediterranean.

In 1233, seven youths in Tuscany founded the Servite Order (also known as the "Servite Friars", or the "Order of the Servants of Mary"). Later in 1239, they took up the sorrows of Mary, standing under the Cross, as the principal devotion of their order. That year, according to Alphonsus Liguori in his book The Glories of Mary, Mary appeared to the seven founders presenting them the black "garment of mourning" that they would wear, telling them that they should often meditate upon her dolors. This Order greatly contributed to the spread of the devotion to Our Lady of Sorrows. The Servites developed the most common devotions to Our Lady's Sorrows, namely the Rosary of the Seven Sorrows, the Black Scapular of the Seven Dolours of Mary, the Novena, Consecration and Litany to Our Lady of Sorrows. The rosary consists of a chaplet of seven septets of beads, upon which is said an Ave, (Hail Mary), separated by one bead, on which is prayed a Pater Noster (the Lord's Prayer, or Our Father). Meditations for each dolor were composed by Pope Pius VII in 1818. The Black Scapular is a symbol of the Confraternity of Our Lady of Sorrows, which is associated with the Servite Order. Most devotional scapulars have requirements regarding ornamentation or design. The devotion of the Black Scapular requires only that it be made of black woollen cloth.

Over the centuries several other devotions, and even orders, arose around meditation on Mary's Sorrows in particular.

Related to this devotion is the Stabat Mater, a hymn composed in honor of the sufferings of Mary during the Crucifixion, generally attributed to Jacopone da Todi (1230-1306).

Alphonsus Liguori dedicated a whole chapter of his book The Glories of Mary (1750) to the seven dolors of Mary, and wrote reflections on each of the seven dolors. In this chapter, he also relates four promises made by Jesus to Mary for those who were devoted to her sorrows. These promises were reportedly revealed to Elizabeth of Hungary (1207-1231).

1. "That those who invoke the divine mother by her sorrows, before death will merit to obtain true repentance of all their sins."
2. "That He will protect such in their tribulations, especially at the hour of death."
3. "That He will impress upon them the memory of his passion, and that they shall have their reward for it in heaven."
4. "That He will commit such devout servants to the hands of Mary, that she may dispose of them according to her pleasure, and obtain for them all the graces she desires."

According to tradition, during the 14th century, Bridget of Sweden is said to have received seven promises from Mary concerning devotion to her seven sorrows.

1. “I will grant peace to their families.”
2. "They will be enlightened about the divine mysteries."
3. "I will console them in their pains and I will accompany them in their work."
4. "I will give them as much as they ask for as long as it does not oppose the adorable will of my divine Son or the sanctification of their souls."
5. "I will defend them in their spiritual battles with the infernal enemy and I will protect them at every instant of their lives."
6. "I will visibly help them at the moment of their death — they will see the face of their mother."
7. "I have obtained this grace from my divine Son, that those who propagate this devotion to my tears and dolors will be taken directly from this earthly life to eternal happiness, since all their sins will be forgiven and my Son will be their eternal consolation and joy."

From the National Shrine of Saint Peregrine spread the Sorrowful Mother Novena, in which the core of the prayers is the Via Matris.

According to the writings of Lúcia dos Santos, one of the visionaries of the Marian apparitions in Fátima, Mary is said to have appeared, among other forms, as Our Lady of Sorrows during the apparition that led to the “Miracle of the Sun” on October 13, 1917.

In 1945, two girls in the town of La Codosera, Spain reported seeing the Virgin Mary in the form of Our Lady of Sorrows. The area in which they witnessed the apparition is called Chandavila and a shrine was built on the site. In August 2024, the Vatican approved of devotions at this site.

On March 6, 1982, according to Marie Claire Mukangango, one of the three approved visionaries of the Marian apparitions in Kibeho, the Virgin Mary taught her the Rosary of the Seven Sorrows and entrusted her with the mission to spread it throughout the world. On May 31, 1982, Marie Claire reported that the Virgin Mary promised that anyone who recites the Rosary of the Seven Sorrows while meditating would find "the strength to repent", along with other graces.

=== Eastern Christianity ===
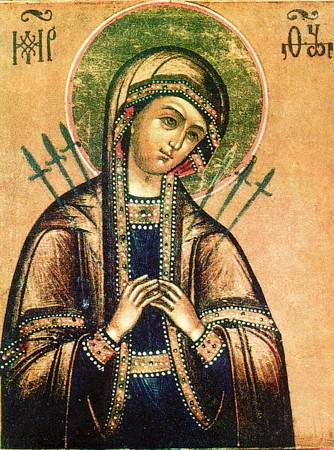
Our Lady who softens evil hearts, Russian icon, 19th century

On February 2, the same day as the Great Feast of the Meeting of the Lord, some Orthodox Christians and Eastern Catholics commemorate a wonder-working icon of the Theotokos (Mother of God) known as "the Softening of Evil Hearts" or "Simeon's Prophecy"..

It depicts Mary at the moment that Simeon the Righteous says, "Yea, a sword shall pierce through thy own soul also...." (Luke 2:35). She stands with her hands upraised in prayer, and seven swords pierce her heart, indicative of the seven sorrows. This is one of the few Orthodox icons of the Theotokos which do not depict the infant Jesus. The refrain "Rejoice, much-sorrowing Mother of God, turn our sorrows into joy and soften the hearts of evil men!" is also used.

Generally, in Byzantine Rite, on all Wednesdays and Fridays that don't fall on any festive periods, at vespers and matins there are special texts referring to the sorrow of the Mother of God under the Cross.

In Ukrainian Greek Catholic Church, the feast of Compassion of the Mother of God is kept on the third Saturday after Pentecost.

In the Western Rite Vicariate of the Antiochian Orthodox Church, the feast of Our Lady of Sorrows is celebrated on the Friday before Palm Sunday and as a separate feast on September 15.

In the Ethiopian Orthodox Tewahedo Church, the 14th-century book called Täʾamrä Maryam (Ge'ez: ተአምረ ማርያም, romanized: Täʾamrä Maryam, lit. 'Miracles of Mary') states that Jesus asked his mother:

"Which sorrows are more painful than others?"
— Täʾamrä Maryam (The Miracles of the Blessed Virgin Mary), trans. E.A. Wallis Budge, 1900

To which she replied:

1) Simeon's prophecy (Luke 2:34–35)
2) the loss of Jesus in the Temple of Jerusalem (Luke 2:41–52)
3) the torture of Christ
4) the crucifixion
5) the Burial of Jesus.

— Täʾamrä Maryam (The Miracles of the Blessed Virgin Mary), trans. E.A. Wallis Budge, 1900.

== Five Lances of the Immaculate Heart ==
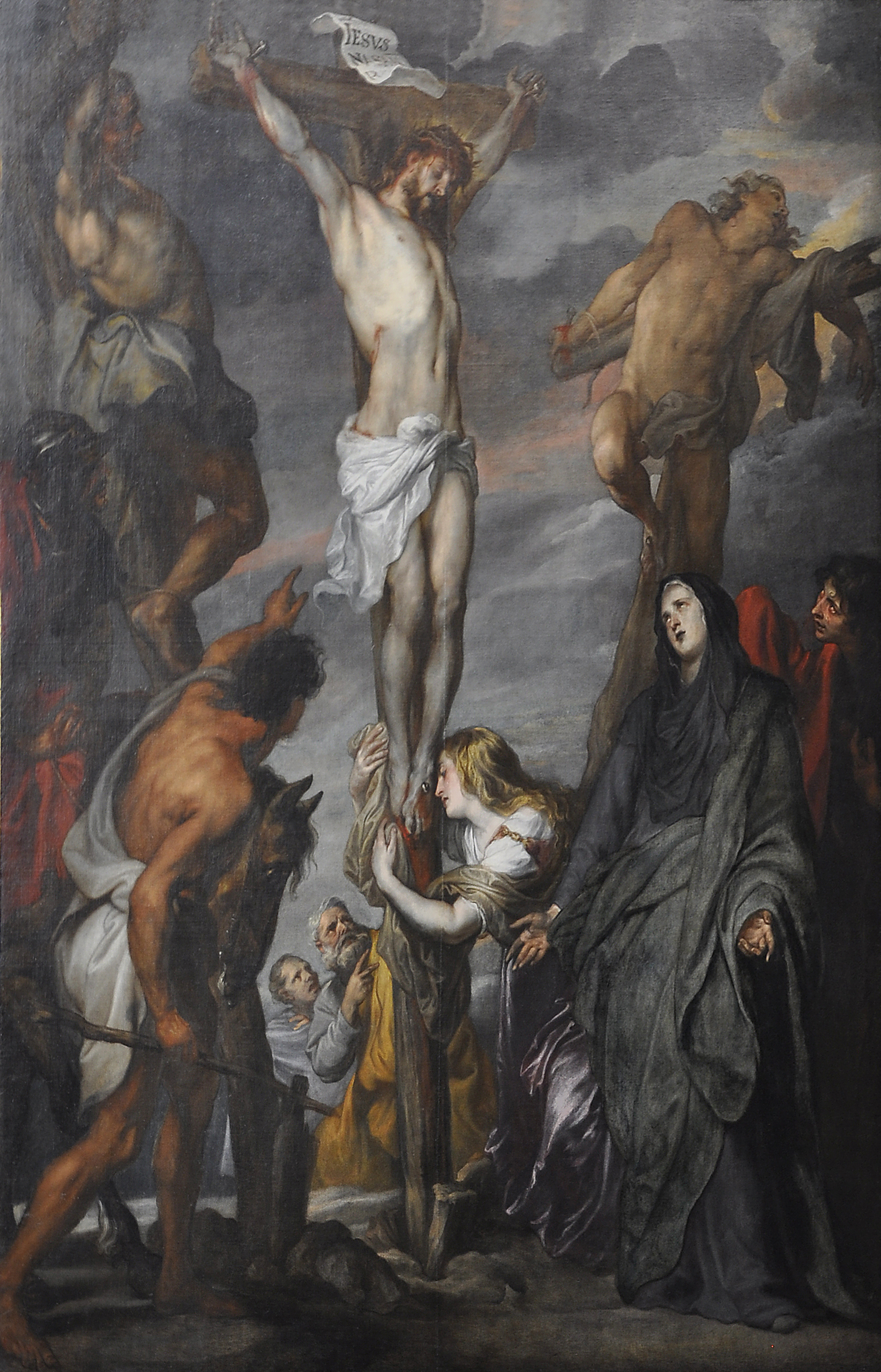
Mary standing at the Cross.

The Five Lances (Latin: Quinque Lanceis) of the Immaculate Heart of Mary refer to events, that according to Bridget of Sweden, were revealed by the Blessed Virgin Mary as having pierced her heart, while she was standing by the Cross. These are not the same as the five sorrowful mysteries of the Rosary.

According to Bridget, Mary stated that the Five Lances were:

1. The exposition of the nakedness of her Son Jesus on the Cross, after being stripped of his garments (Tenth Station of the Cross);
2. The Mocking of Jesus;
3. The placement of the Crown of Thorns on her Jesus's head and his bleeding afterwards;
4. Jesus's crying out "Eli Eli lama sabachthani," understood by her as if he was saying "Father, there is none to have mercy on me, but thou.";
5. The death of Jesus on the Cross.

== Liturgical feast ==
=== Our Lady of Compassion ===
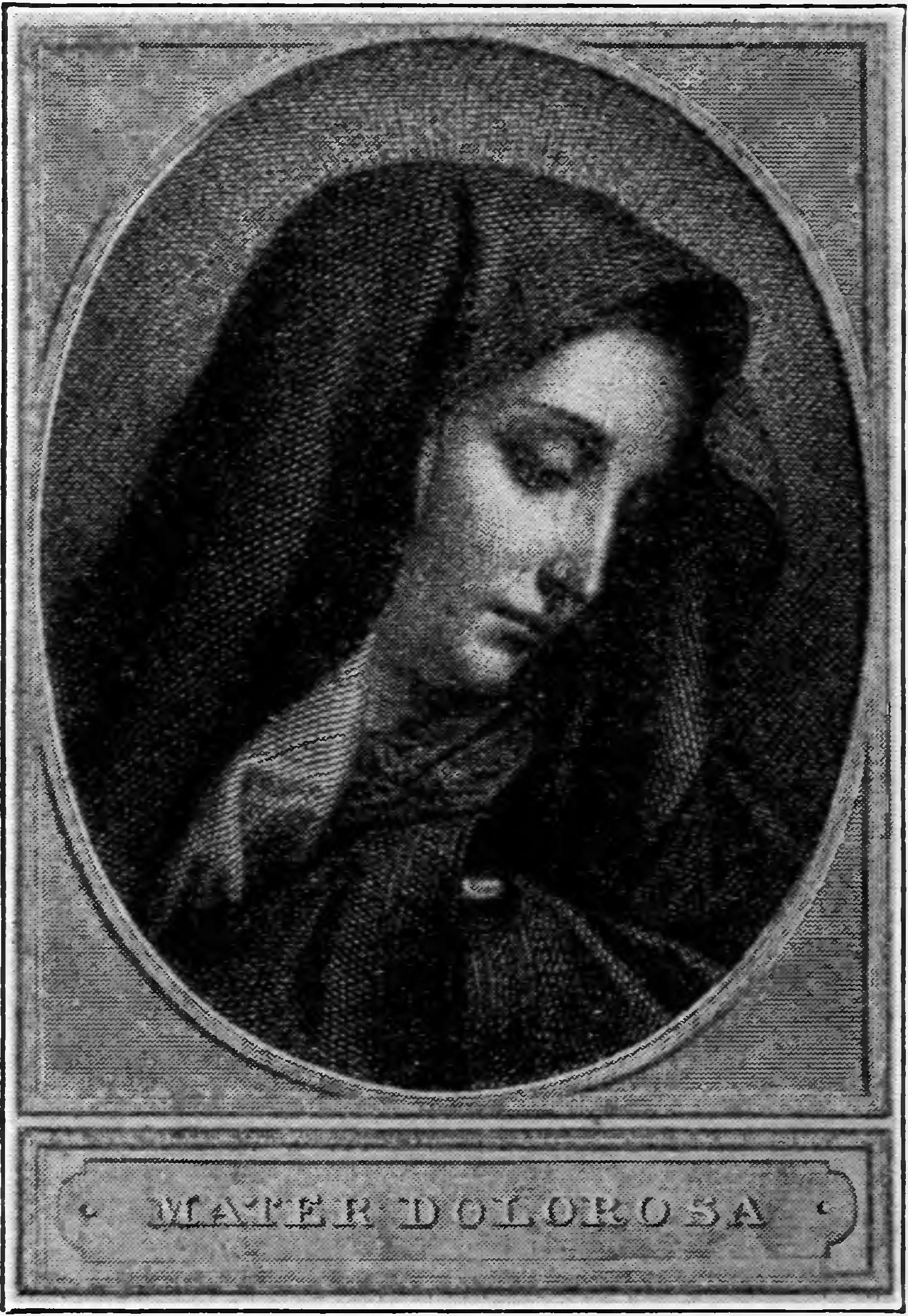
Mater Dolorosa

The Feast of Our Lady of Sorrows grew in popularity in the 12th century, although under various titles. Some writings would place its roots in the eleventh century, especially among the Benedictine monks.

The feast of the Our Lady of Sorrows was originated by a provincial synod of Cologne in 1423. It was designated for the Friday after the third Sunday after Easter and had the title: Commemoratio angustiae et doloris B. Mariae V. Its object was the sorrow of Mary during the Crucifixion and Death of Christ. Before the sixteenth century this feast was limited to the dioceses of North Germany, Scandinavia, and Scotland.

According to Fr. William Saunders, "in 1482, the feast was officially placed in the Roman Missal under the title of Our Lady of Compassion, highlighting the great love our Blessed Mother displayed in suffering with her Son. The word compassion derives from the Latin roots cum and patior which means "to suffer with".

After 1600 it became popular in France and was set for the Friday before Palm Sunday. By a Decree of 22 April 1727, Pope Benedict XIII extended it to the entire Latin Church, under the title "Septem dolorum B.M.V.". In 1954, it still held the rank of major double (slightly lower than the rank of the September feast) in the General Roman Calendar. Pope John XXIII's 1960 Code of Rubrics reduced it to the level of a commemoration.

=== The Seven Sorrows of the Blessed Virgin Mary ===
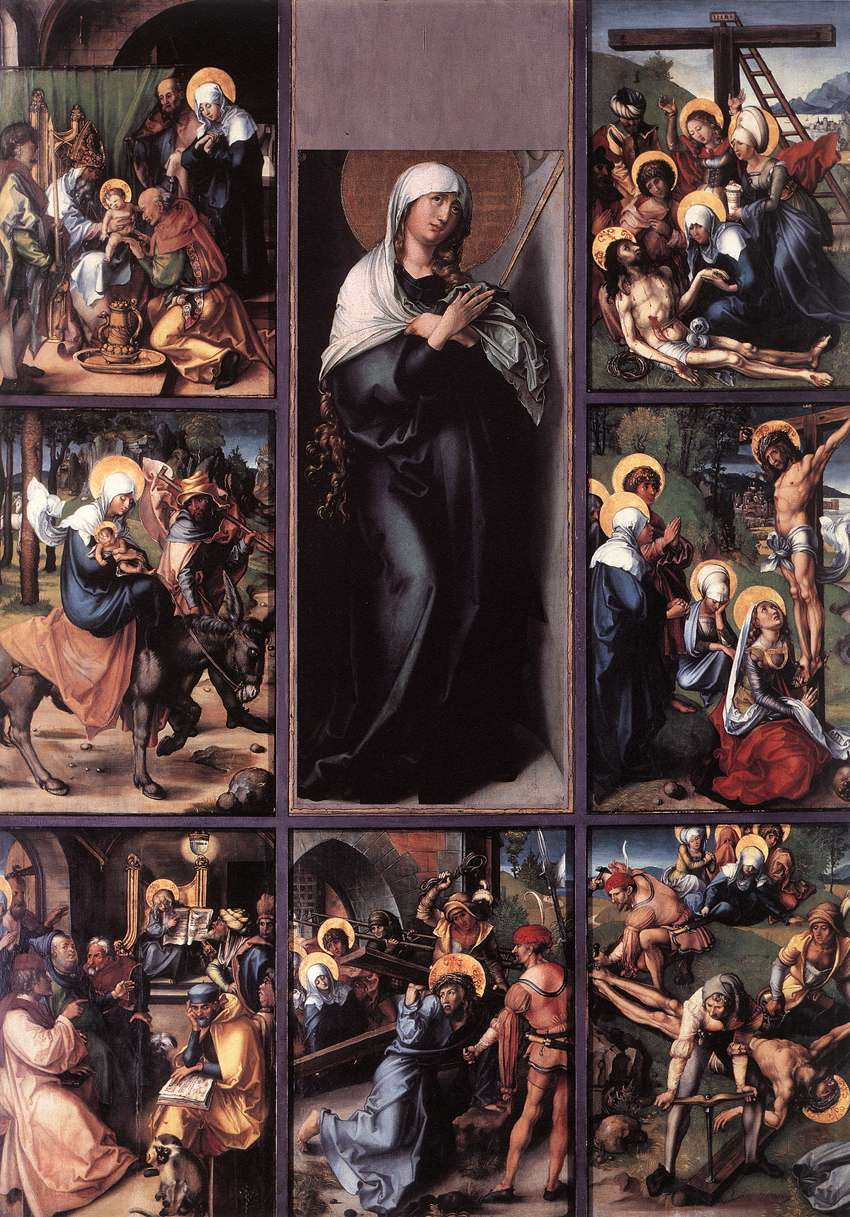
Seven Sorrows Polyptych Albrecht Dürer, c. 1500

In 1668, a separate feast of the Seven Sorrows of Mary, celebrated on the third Sunday in September, was granted to the Servites. Pope Innocent XII renamed it the Feast of Our Lady of Sorrows. Pope Pius VII introduced it into the General Roman Calendar in 1814. In 1913, Pope Pius X, in view of his reform giving precedence to Sundays over ordinary feasts, moved this feast to September 15, the day after the Feast of the Cross. It is still observed on that date.

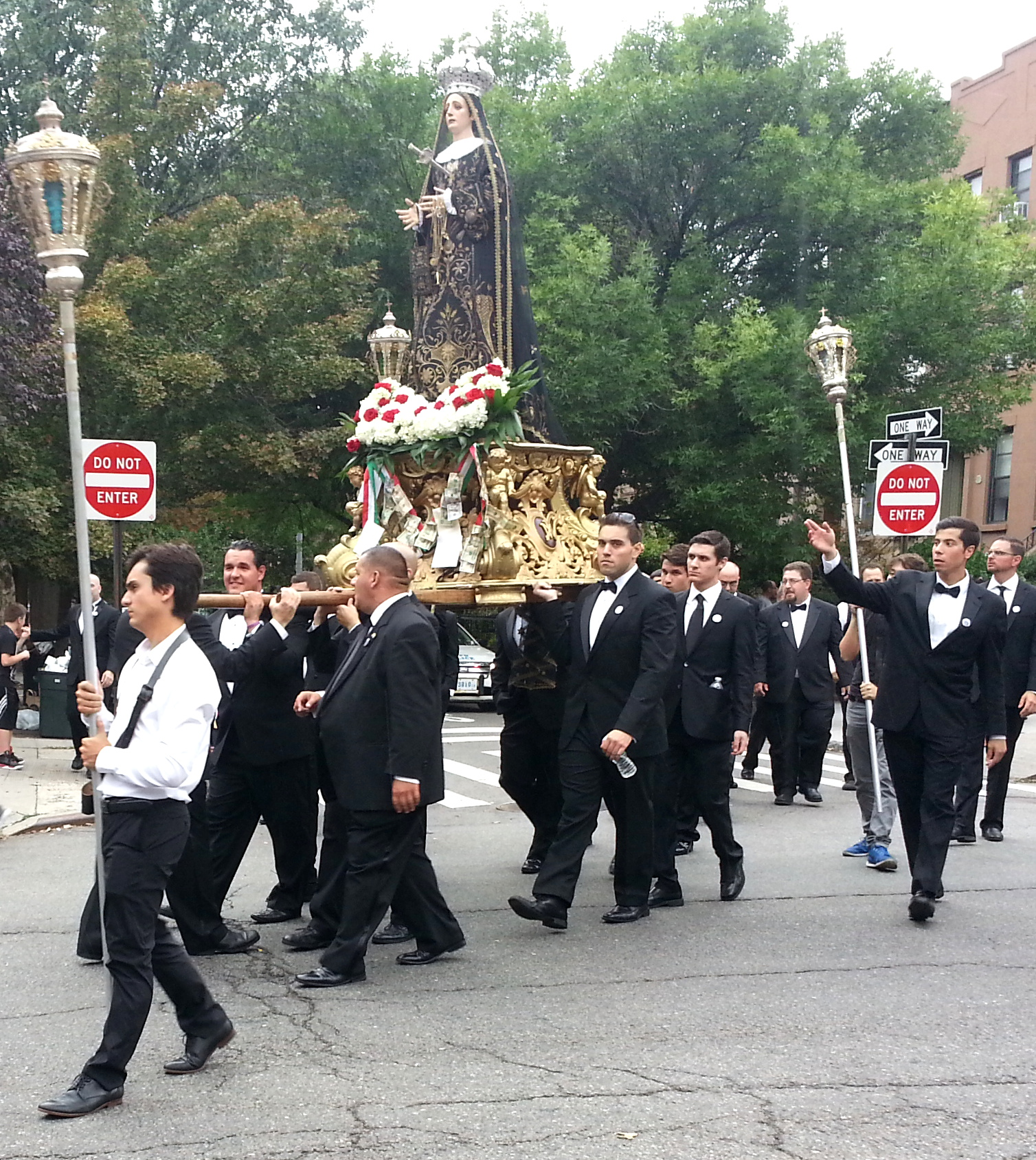
Annual procession in honour of Our Lady of Sorrows in Carroll Gardens, Brooklyn

Since there were thus two feasts with the same title, on each of which the Stabat Mater sequence was recited, the Passion Week celebration was removed from the General Roman Calendar in 1969 as a duplicate of the September feast. Each of the two celebrations had been called a feast of "The Seven Sorrows of the Blessed Virgin Mary" (Latin: Septem Dolorum Beatae Mariae Virginis). Recitation of the Stabat Mater was made optional.

On the second Sunday of September, the congregation of Maria SS. Addolorata in the Carroll Gardens neighborhood of Brooklyn, hold an annual procession with a statue of Our Lady of Sorrows. The tradition started in the 1940s with Italian immigrants from Mola di Bari celebrating the Feast of their hometown patroness, Our Lady of Sorrows.

== Iconography ==
Our Lady of Sorrows, depicted as "Mater Dolorosa" (Mother of Sorrows) has been the subject of some key works of Catholic Marian art. Mater Dolorosa is one of the three common artistic representations of a sorrowful Virgin Mary, the other two being Stabat Mater and the Pietà.

In this iconography, Our Lady of Seven Sorrows is at times simply represented in a sad and anguished mode by herself, her expression being that of tears and sadness. In other representations the Virgin Mary is depicted with seven swords in her heart, a reference to the prophecy of Simeon at the Presentation of Jesus at the Temple. The type dates from the latter part of the 15th century.

== Patronage ==
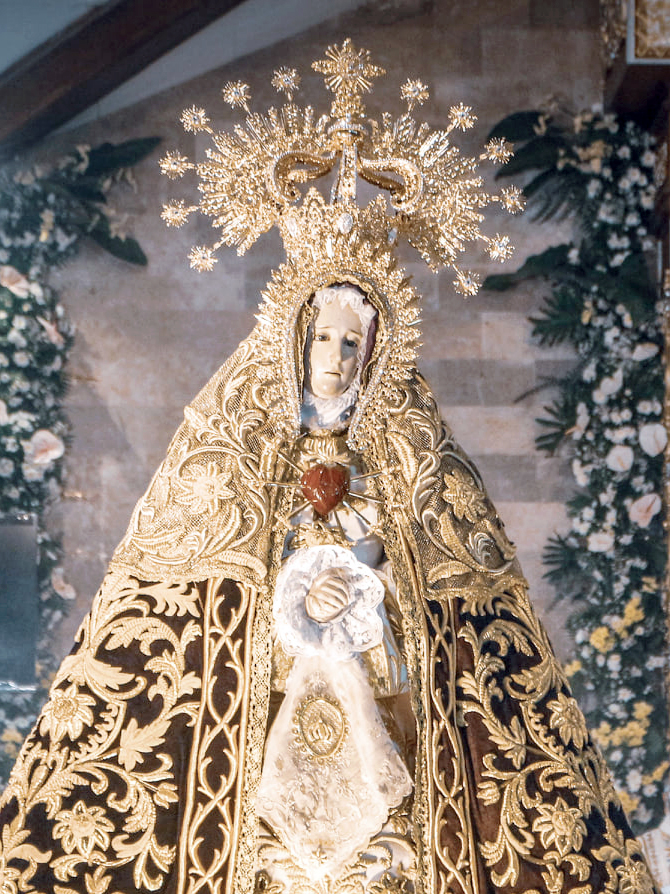
Our Lady of Sorrows venerated in Dolores, Quezon, Philippines

Our Lady of Sorrows is the patron saint of:

- people named Dolores, Dolorita, Lola and Pia.
- The Congregation of the Mother of the Redeemer
- The Congregation of Holy Cross
- Order of the Servants of Mary
- Sisters of Our Lady of Sorrows
- Slovakia: 15 September is also a national public holiday
- Poland: the icon Our Lady of Sorrows, Queen and Patroness of Poland (see also: Patron saints of Poland § Primary) was canonically crowned by Pope Paul VI on 15 August 1967.
- Mississippi, United States
- Caruaru, Brazil
- Lanzarote, Canary Islands
- Nuestra Señora de la Soledad de Porta Vaga, Queen and Patroness of the City and Province of Cavite, Philippines
- Ronda, Cebu
- Granada, Spain: September 15 is a public holiday in the city.
- Mola di Bari and the Molise region of Italy

Churches:

- Mater Dolorosa (Berlin-Lankwitz)
- Our Lady of Sorrows Basilica, Chicago, United States
- Our Lady of Sorrows Basilica, Šaštín-Stráže, Slovakia
- Église Notre-Dame-des-Sept-Douleurs, Montreal, Canada
- Senhora das Dores Church, Póvoa de Varzim, Portugal
- Nuestra Señora de los Dolores, Montevideo
- St. Mary of Sorrows (Fairfax, Virginia)
- Our Lady of Sorrows Roman Catholic Church (South Orange, New Jersey)
- Our Lady of Sorrows Church (Wahiawa, Hawaii)
- Our Lady of Sorrows Church (Santa Barbara, California)
- Our Lady of Sorrows Church in Ká-Hó, Coloane, Macau.
- Our Lady of Sorrows of Calolbon (Batong Paloway), Paloway, San Andres, Catanduanes, Philippines
- National Shrine of Our Lady of Sorrows, Dolores, Quezon, Philippines
- Diocesan Shrine of Nuestra Señora de los Dolores de Turumba, Pakil, Laguna, Philippines
- Church of Our Lady of Seven Sorrows (Czech: Kostel Panny Marie Sedmibolestné, lit. 'Church of Virgin Mary of Seven Pains'), Rabštejn nad Střelou, Czech Republic
- Our Lady of Compassion, Piedade, Goa, India
- Shrine of Our Lady of Sorrows, Starkenburg, Missouri
- Church of Blessed Virgin Mary of Sorrows, Špansko, Zagreb
- Church of Our Lady of Sorrows, Mrkopalj, Croatia
- Basilica santuario di Maria Santissima Addolorata, Molise, Italy
- Our Lady of Good Health, Tamil Nadu, India
- Parish Church of Our Lady of Seven Sorrows, Bandung, Indonesia
- Basilica of Our Lady of Dolours (Puthenpally), Thrissur, Kerala, India
- St. Mary of Sorrows, Walsenburg, Colorado
- Our Lady of Seven Dolors, Festina, Iowa
- Our Lady of Sorrows, San Antonio, Texas

== Gallery ==
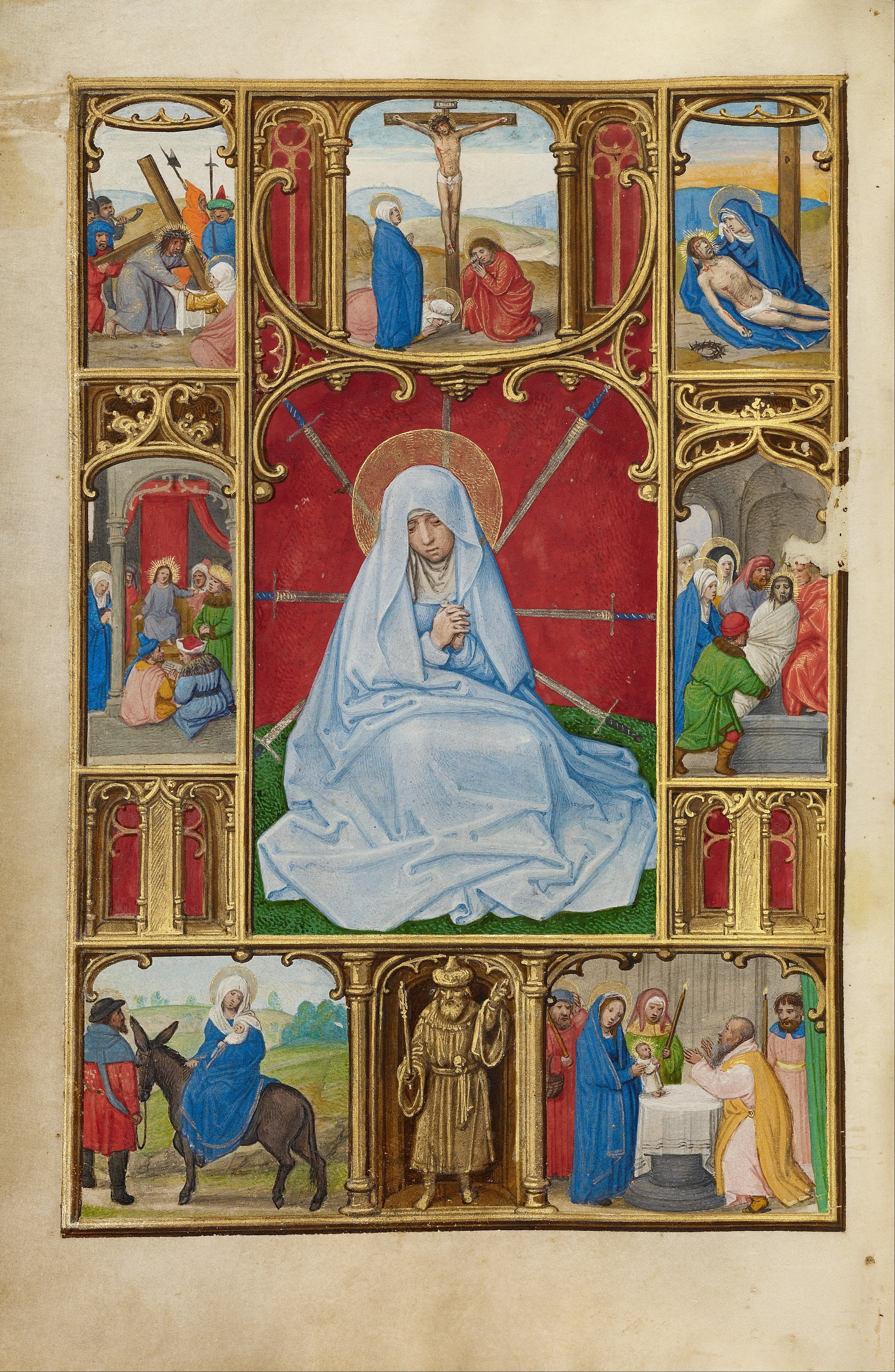
The Seven Sorrows of the Virgin, miniature by Simon Bening, c. 1500

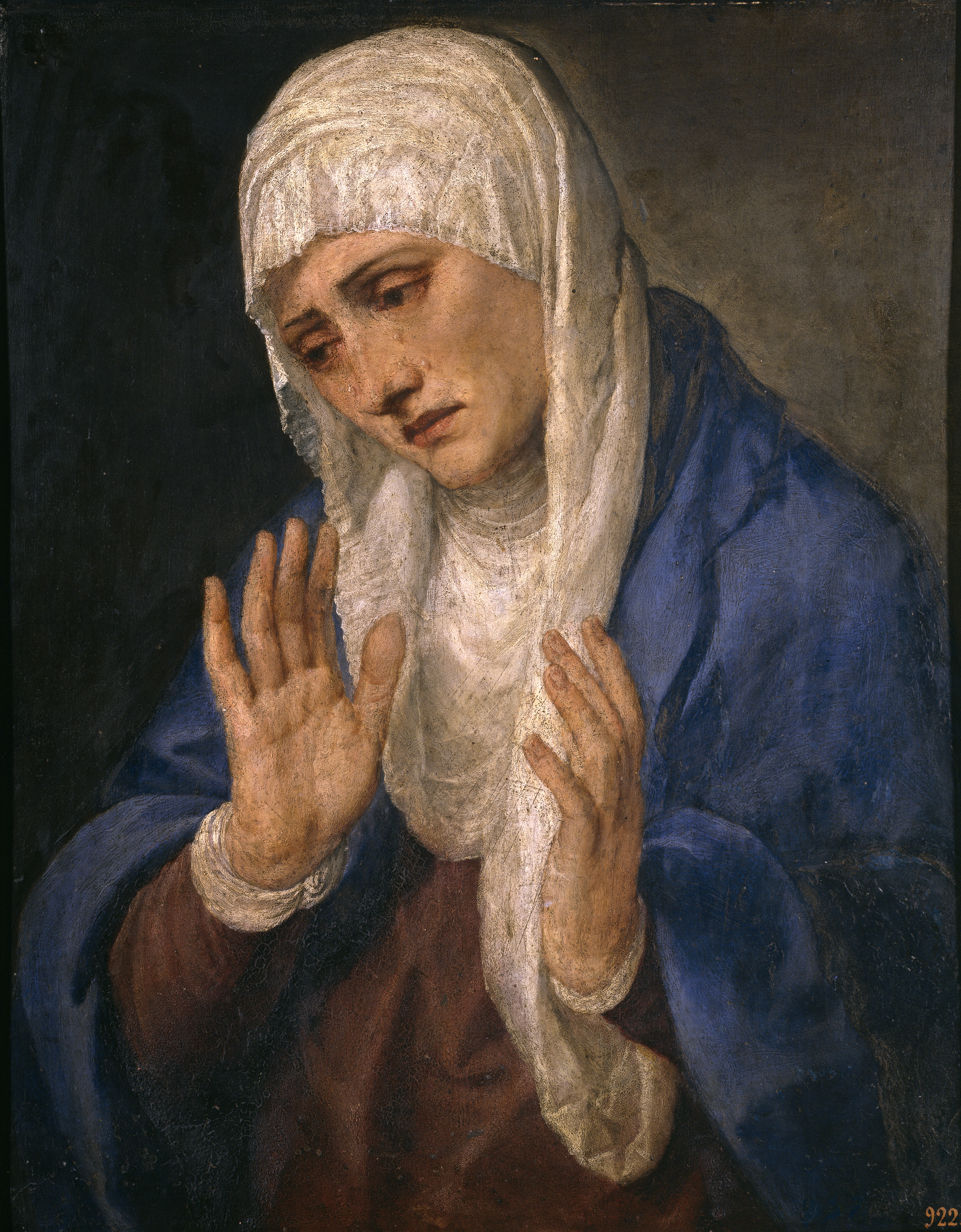
Mater Dolorosa with open hands, by Titian, 1554

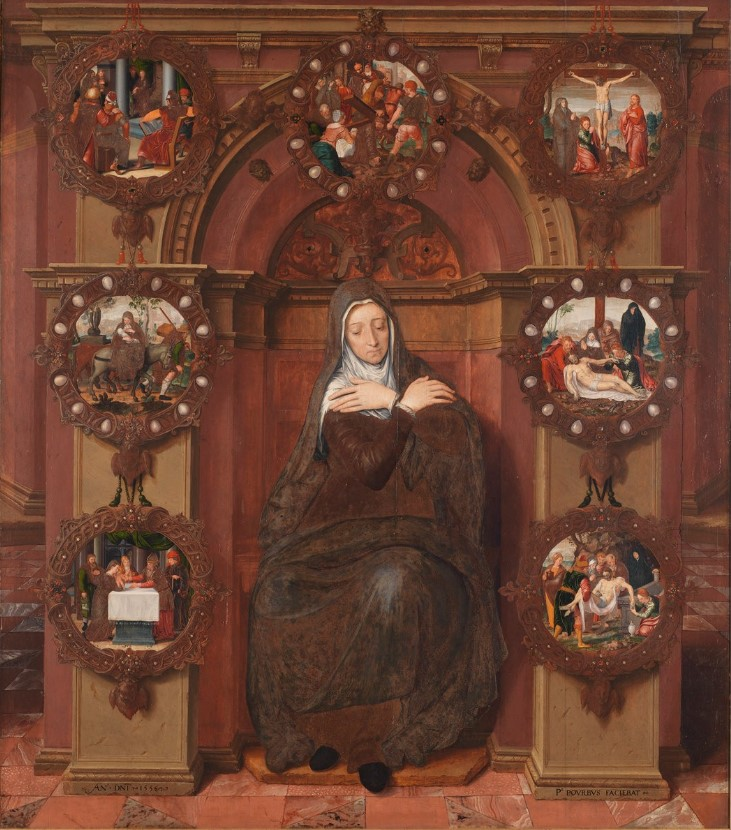
Our Lady of Sorrows, by Pieter Pourbus, 1556

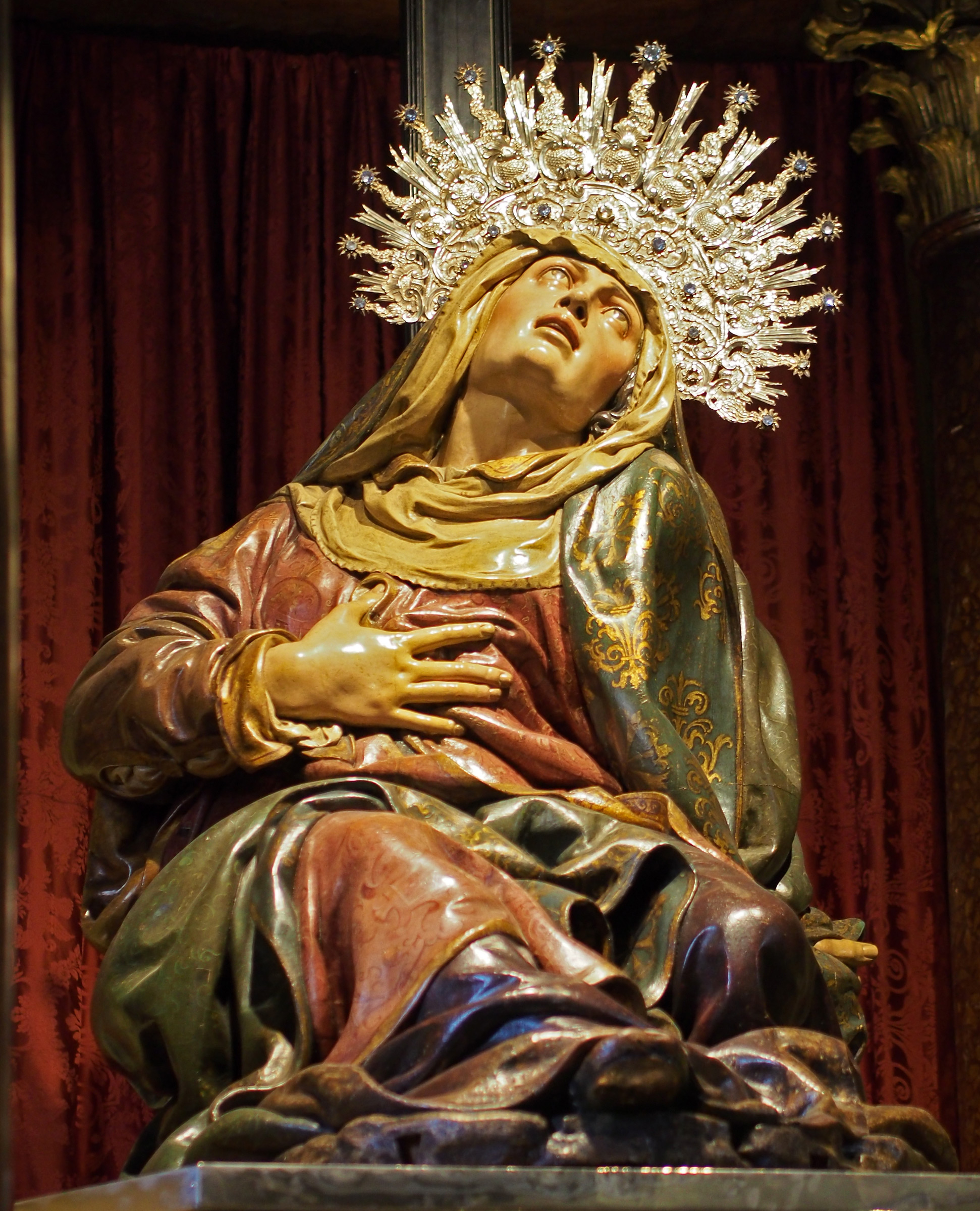
Madonna in Sorrow, by Juan de Juni, 1571

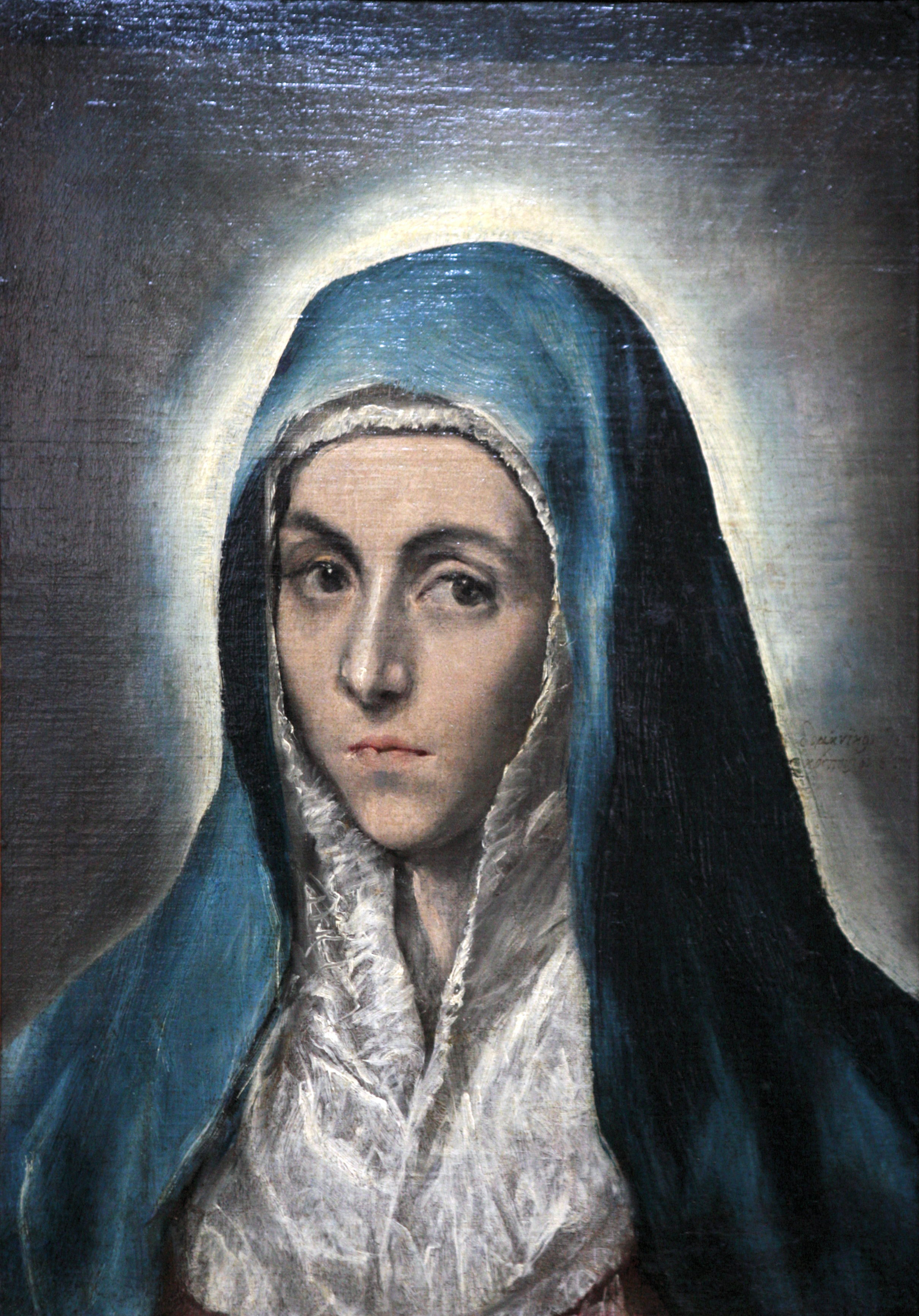
Mater dolorosa, by El Greco c. 1590

Dolorosa, Murillo, 1665

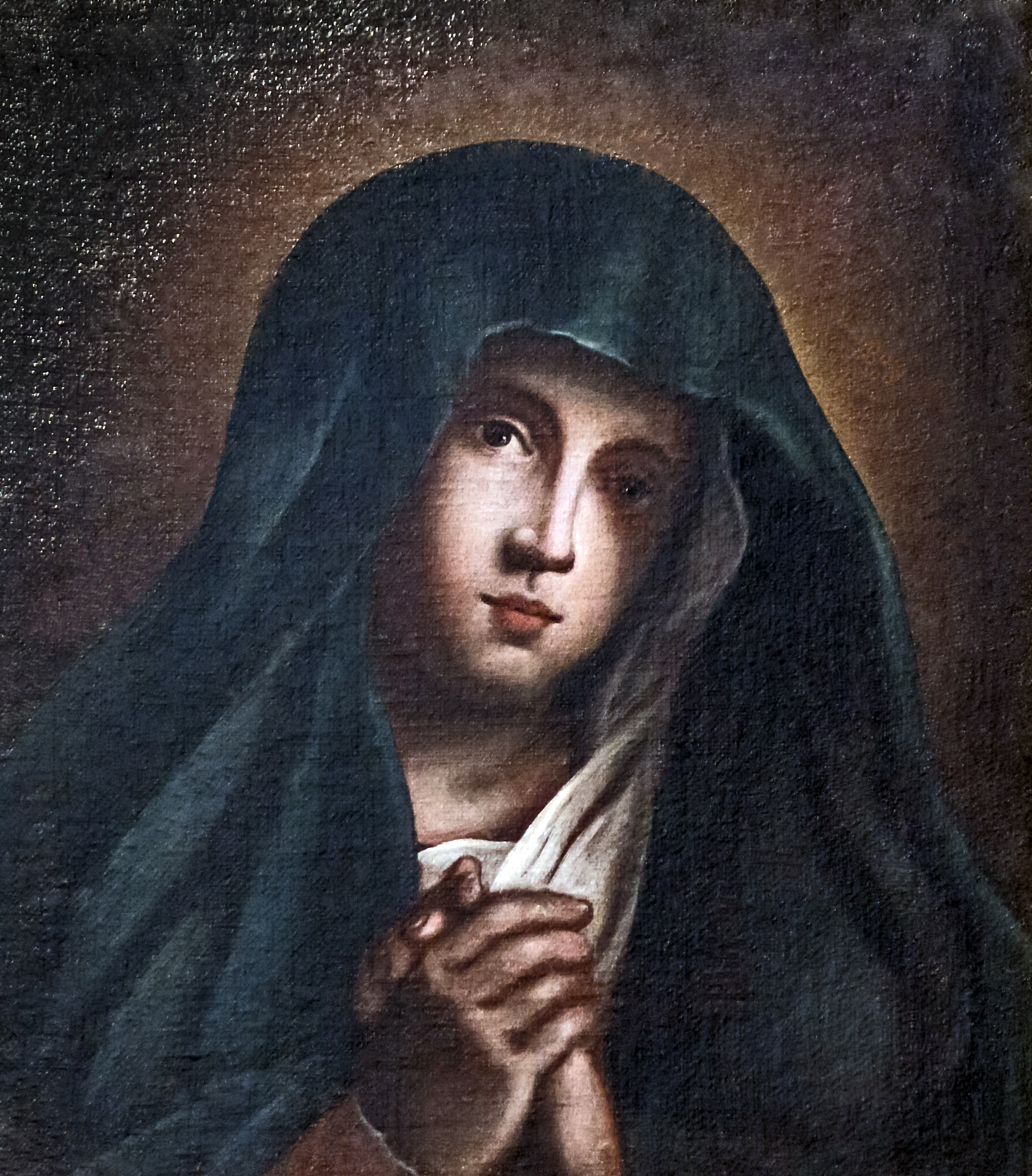
The Madonna in Sorrow by Giovanni Battista Salvi da Sassoferrato, 17th century

Mater Dolorosa The oldest image in the Philippines dating 1785 owned by the Macalalag Family in Iloilo City, Philippines.

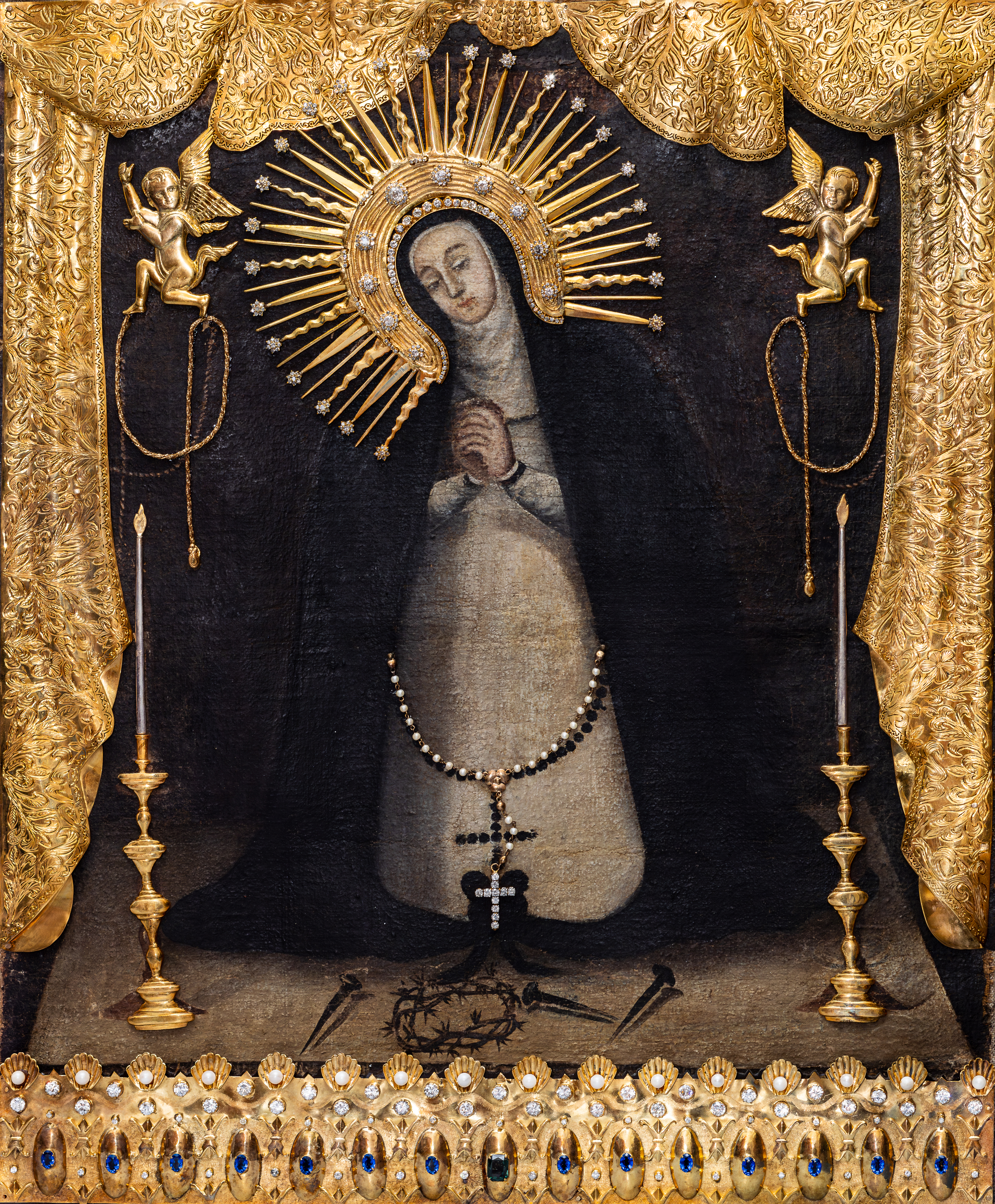
Nuestra Señora de la Soledad de Porta Vaga, Philippines.

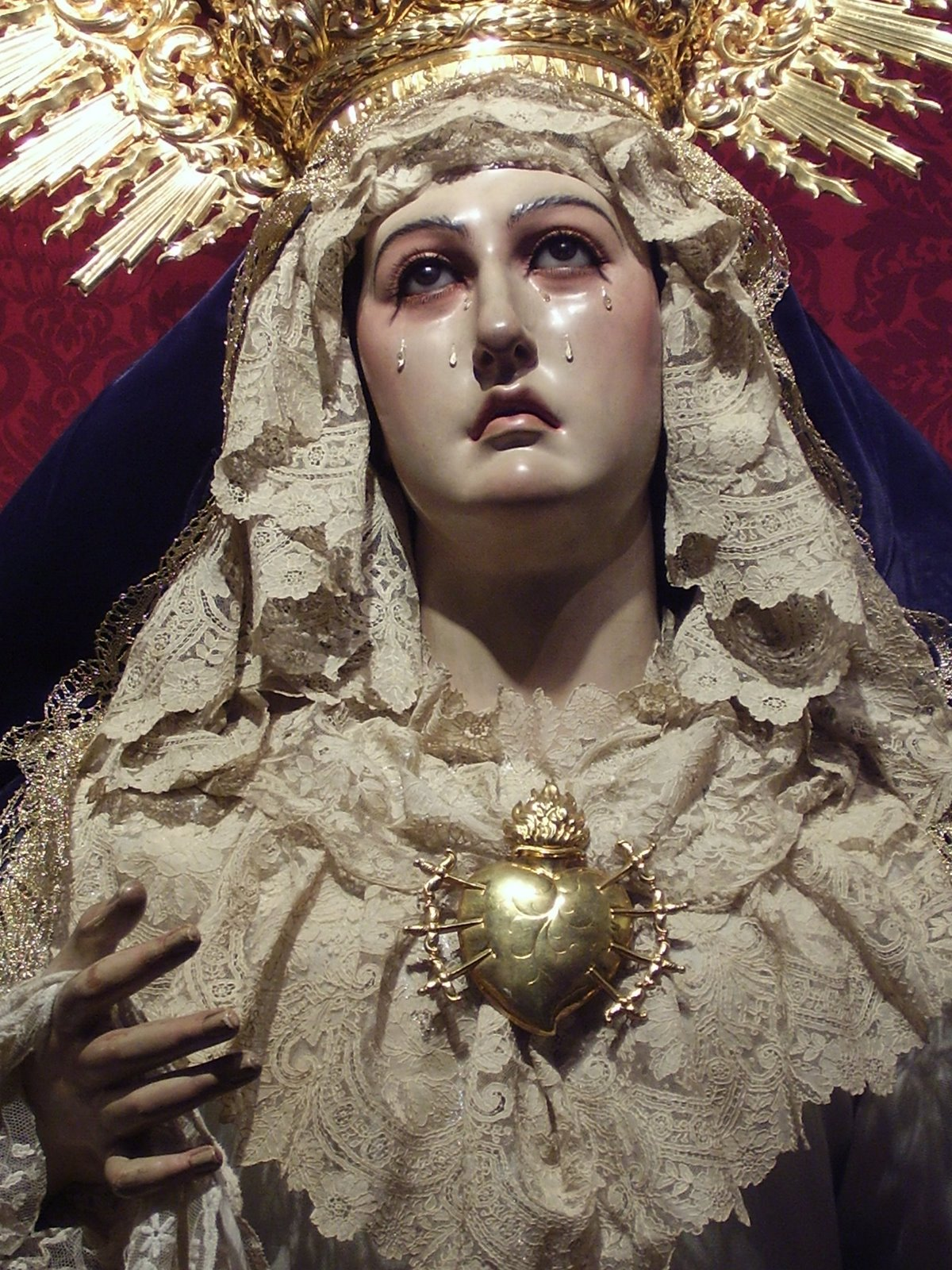
Our Lady of Sorrows, El Viso del Alcor, Seville, Spain.

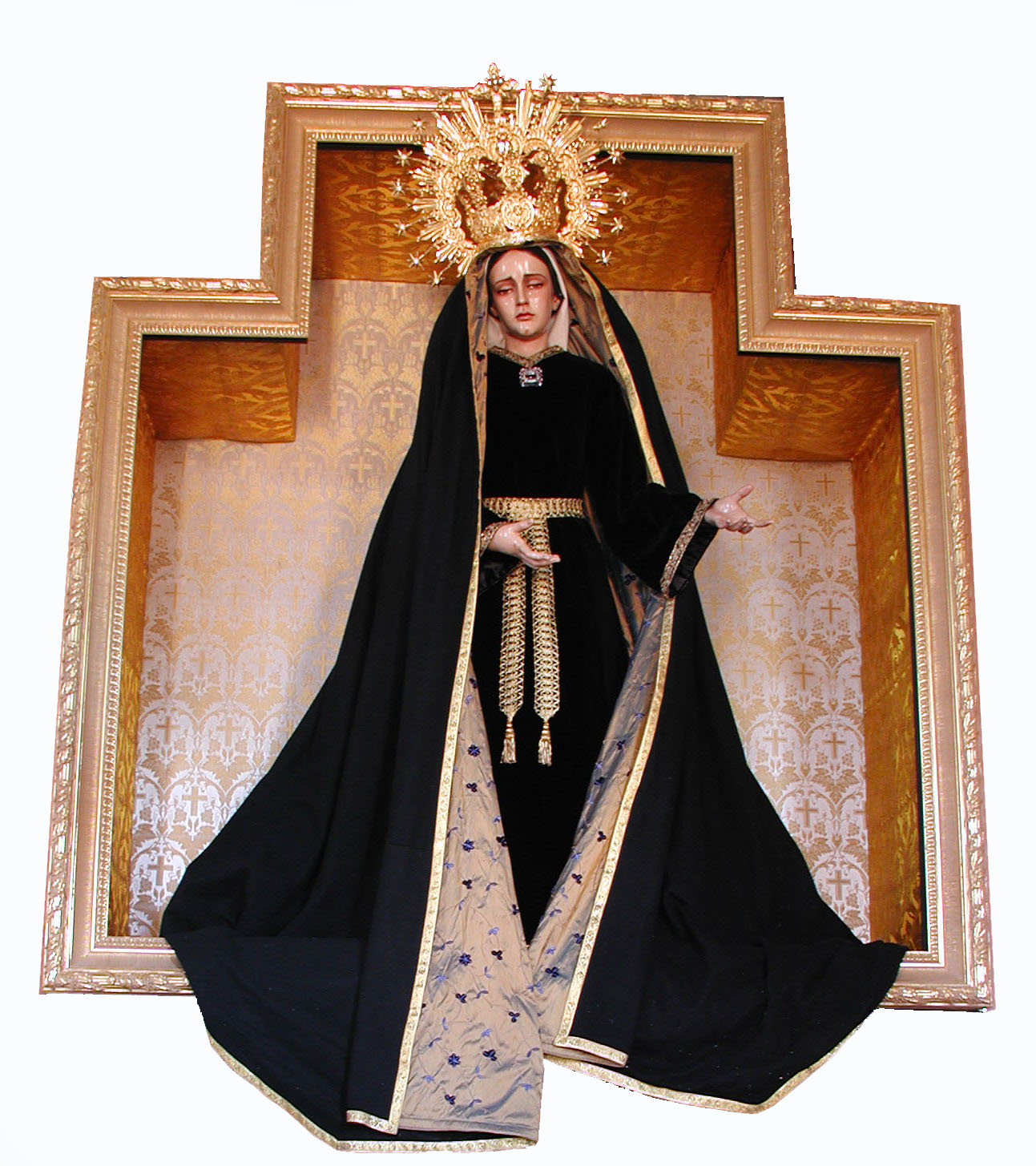
Sorrowful Mother of Warfhuizen, Warfhuizen, Netherlands

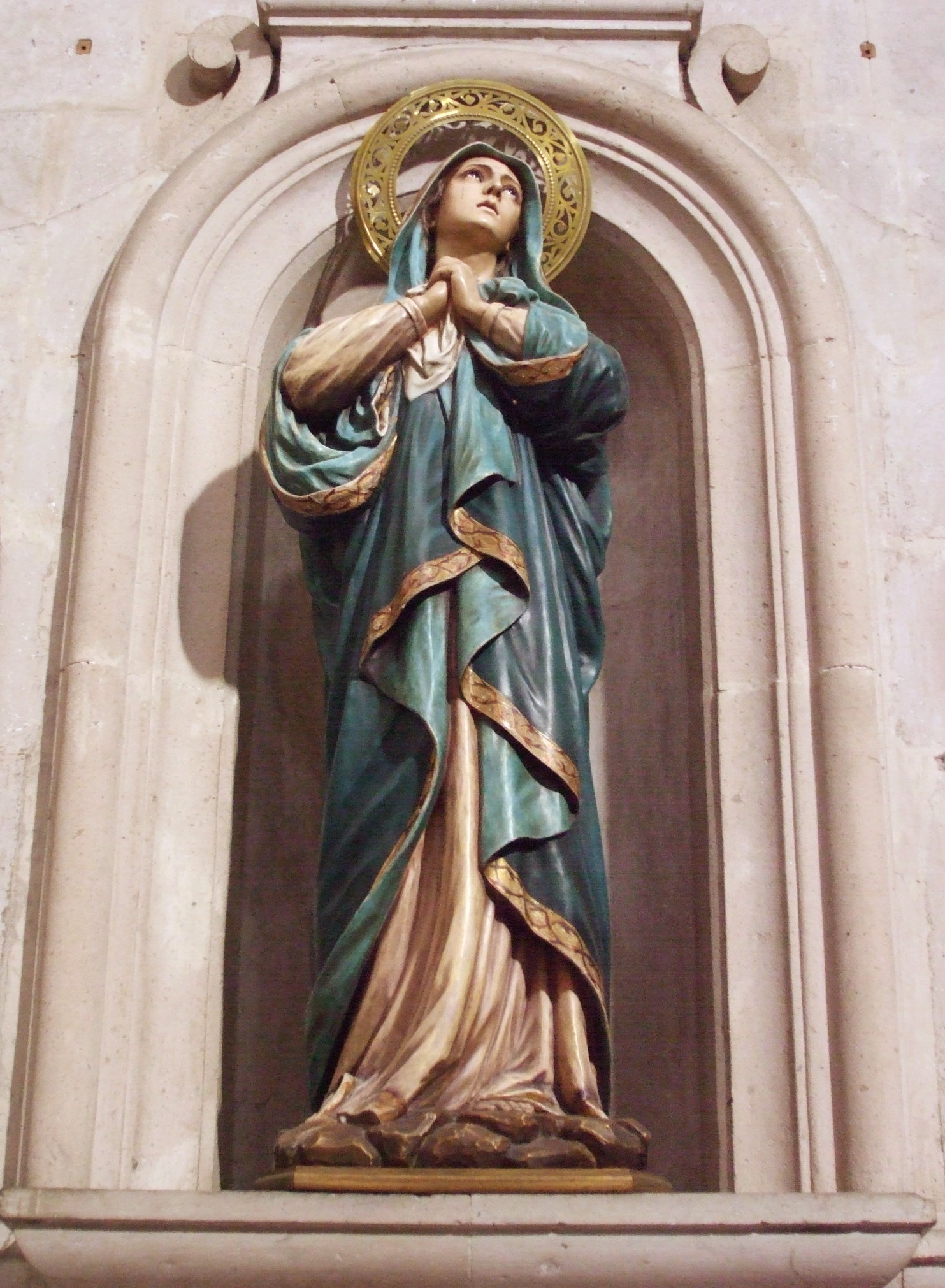
Nuestra Señora de Dolores, Metropolitan Cathedral of Chihuahua, Mexico

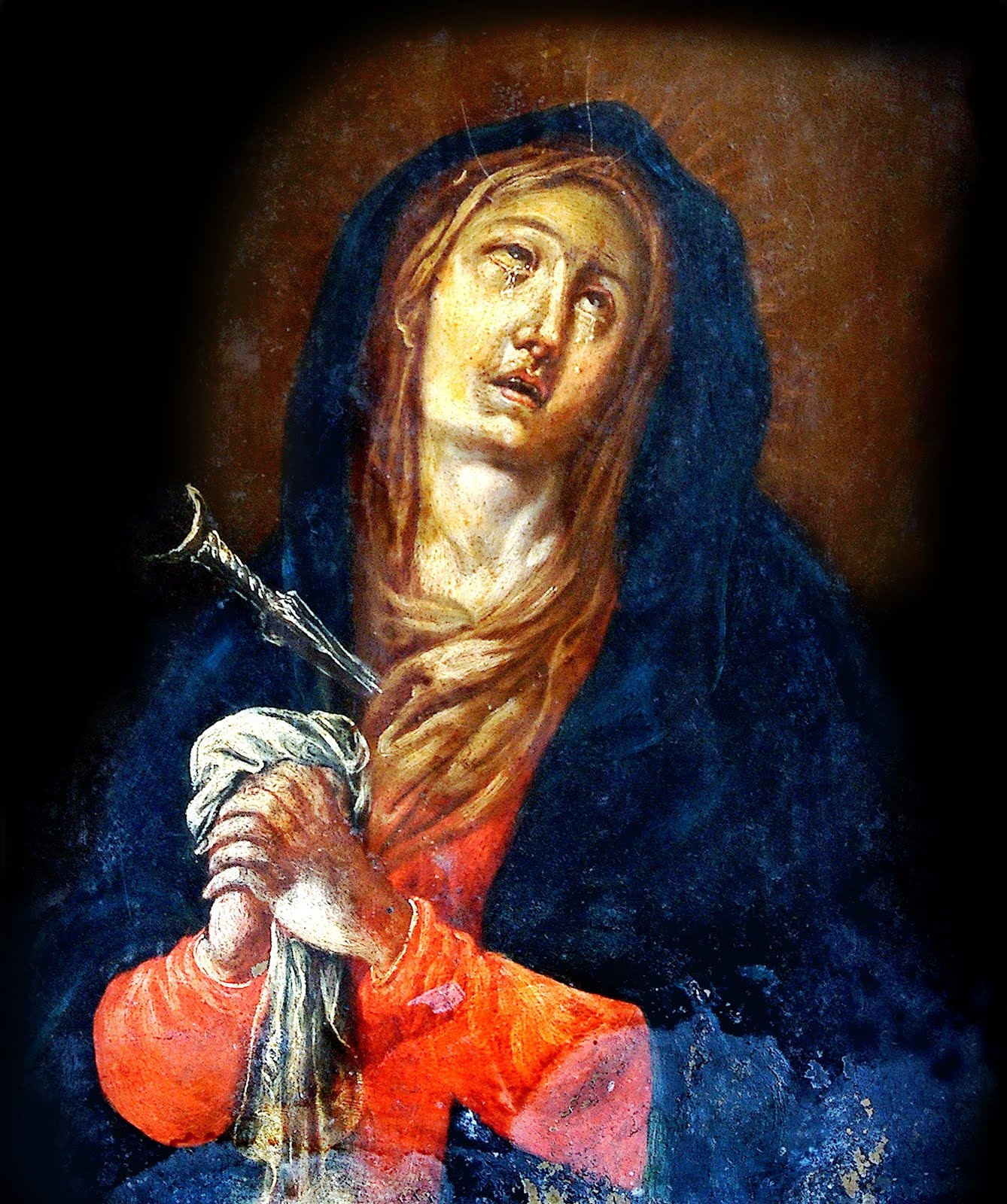
Nuestra Señora de los Dolores de Turumba, Pakil, Laguna, Philippines

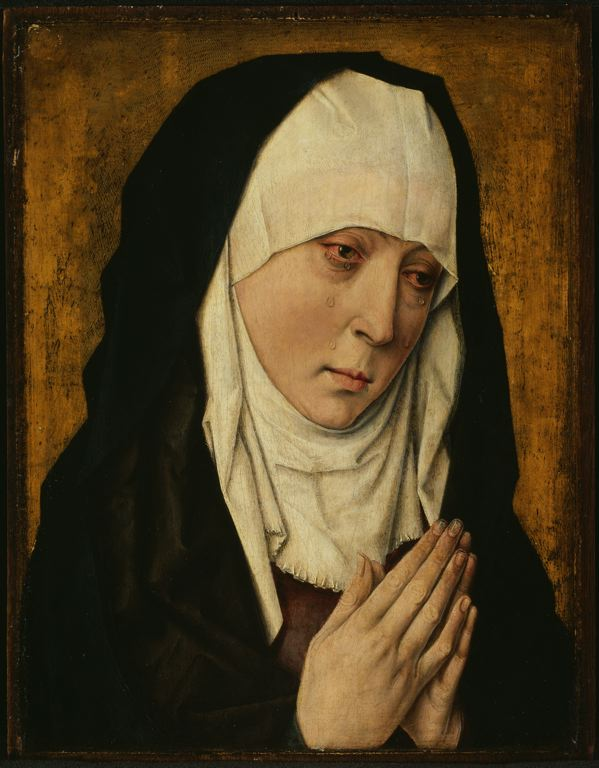
Dieric Bouts, Netherlandish, Mater Dolorosa, 1470–75

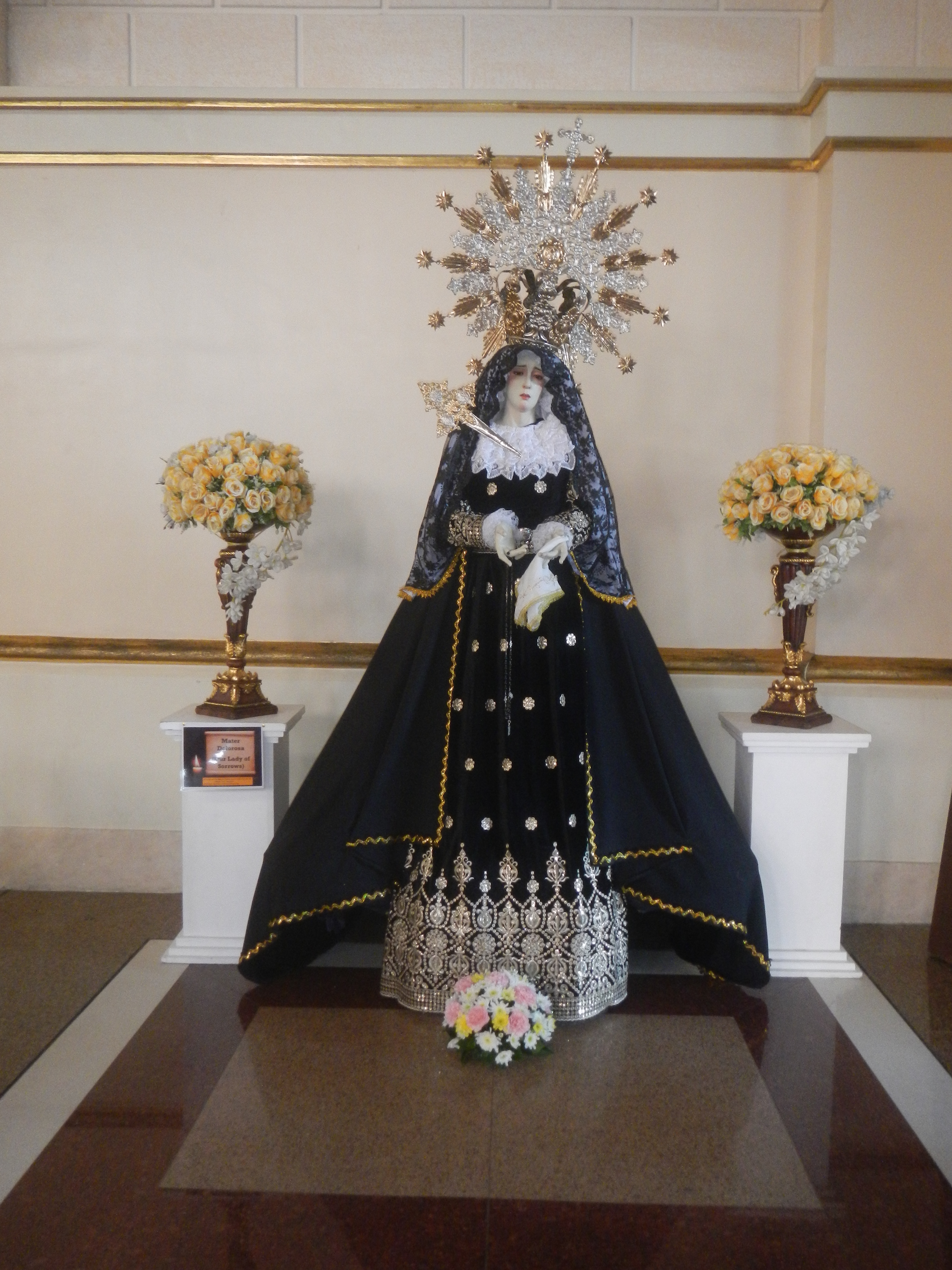
Our Lady of Sorrows in the Sacred Heart of Jesus Parish, Muntinlupa

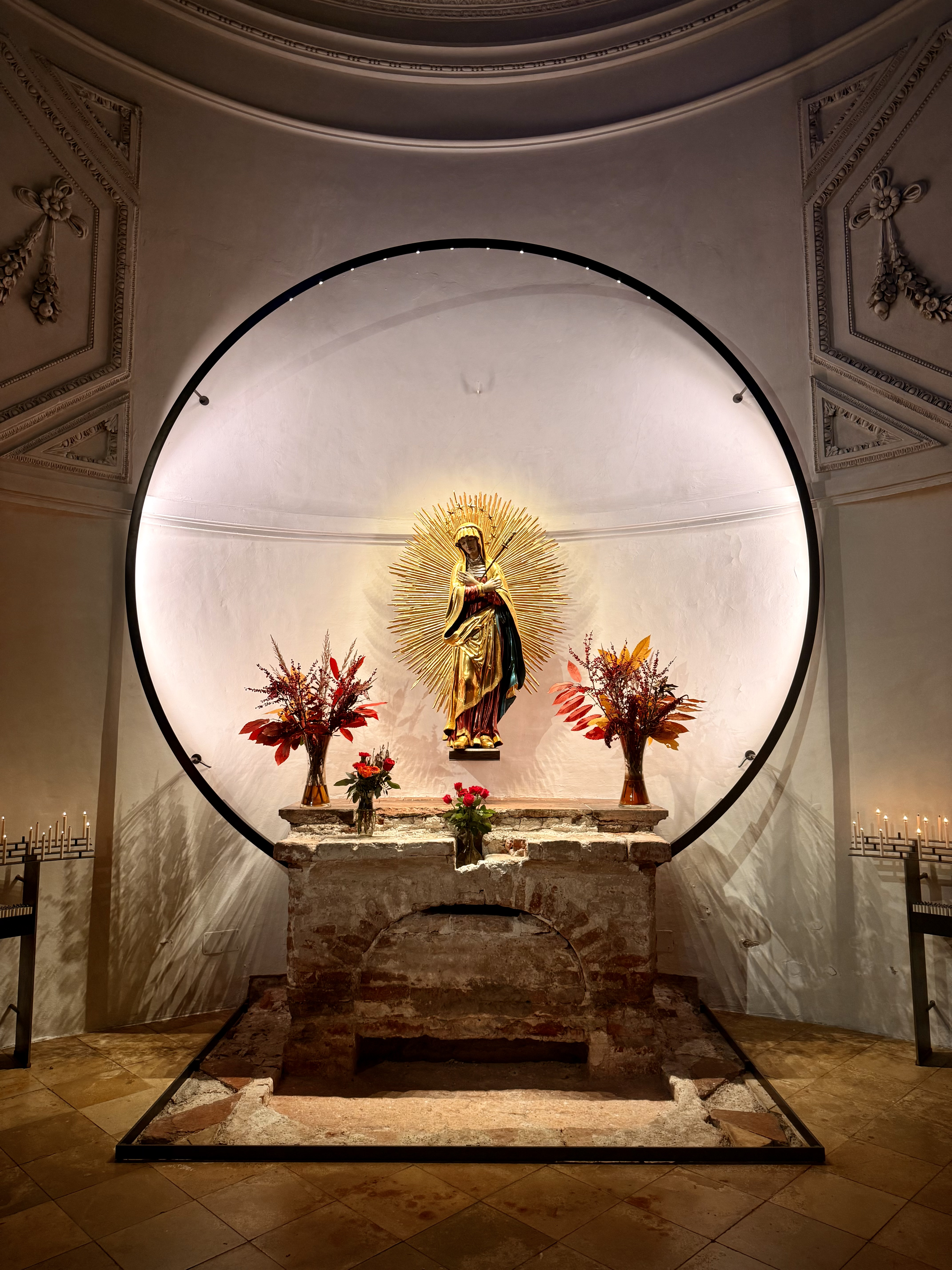
Mater Dolorosa (1855) in the Marian Chapel (2024) of St Michael’s, Munich, a key site of Catholic resistance to Nazism through Rupert Mayer SJ. The damaged base of the original altar, lost in WWII, links Mary’s sorrow to the church’s own “scar of war”.

== See also ==
- Mission San Francisco de Asís in San Francisco, California, known also as Mission Dolores
- Seven Joys of the Virgin
- Man of Sorrows
