= Our Lady of Sorrows of Calolbon (Batong Paloway) =

Venerated image of the Virgin Mary

Our Lady of Sorrows of Batong Paloway Nuestra Señora de los Dolores de Batong Paloway Nuestra Señora de los Dolores de Batong Paloway
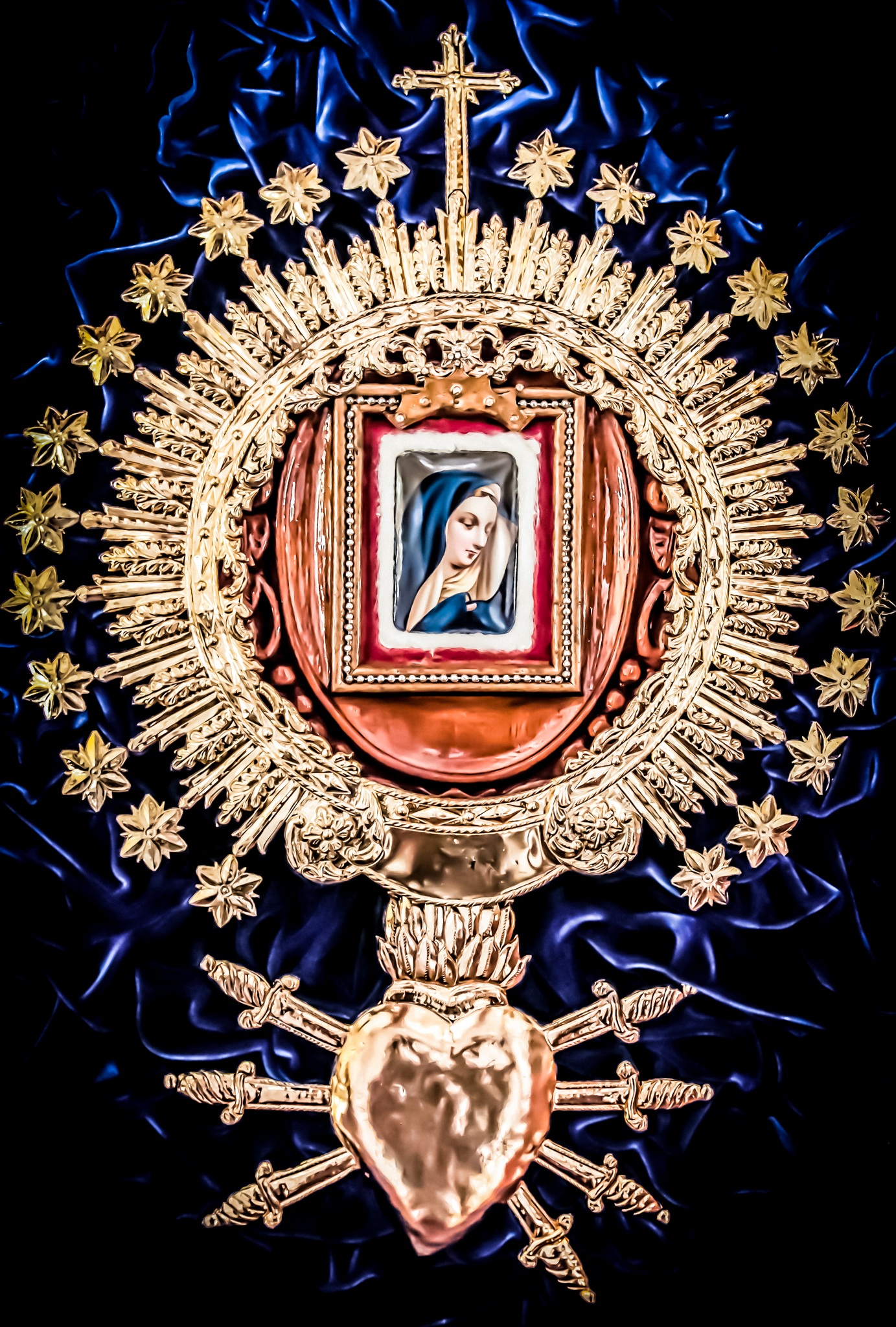
- Original icon of Our Lady of Sorrows of Batong Paloway
- Venerated in: Catholic Church in the Philippines; Philippine Independent Church
- Major shrine: Our Lady of Sorrows Shrine Batong Paloway, San Andres, Catanduanes; Philippines

Our Lady of Sorrows of Batong Paloway is an image of the Blessed Virgin Mary on a stone, venerated in Catanduanes, Philippines.

The image on the stone is derived from the Spanish icon of "Our Lady of the Finger" (Nuestra Señora del Dedo), which shows her finger coming out from underneath her veil. Since this title was not yet known or popular in the Philippines at the turn of the 20th century (when the image was discovered), devotees conflated it with Our Lady of Sorrows, a more popular form, especially during Holy Week.

== History ==
From 1900 to 1910, the town of Calolbon felt the strains of the transition to American rule. The people slowly adjusted the new era, hoped for the lesser cruelty and prayed for a total change. Religion at that times was their consolation, their weapon and solace toward off evils, their source of hope for a better place to live in only through the power of prayers that their wishes be granted.

Religious as they were, villagers did not miss reciting the Angelus at six o’clock in the morning and in the evening of each day. By nature, the natives were resilient, hardworking and God-fearing. Their means of living primarily came from farming, supplemented fishing. This was the picture of Calolbon and its people, where graft and corruption and various crimes were unheard of.

It was harvest season (October to November); the people were busy harvesting the palay. One late morning, another happening was in the making. Pacio Socao, together with his companion, was herding carabaos in the Culapnit, a few kilometers away from the Poblacion.

After placing their carabaos in a grassy plain, Pacio started to look for a place where he might rest, and he chose an iba or kamiás (Averrhoa bilimbi) tree. When he started to climb, he was attracted by a luminous object sthat shone in the morning sun. He picked up the object and saw it was a stone imprinted with the features of an enchanting woman. He showed it to his companion, who remarked that it might be an aswang or something evil. Pacio thus threw the stone away, and it landed in carabao mud hole (lab-ogan) surrounded by thick bushes and guava trees. The boys then forgot about the incident.

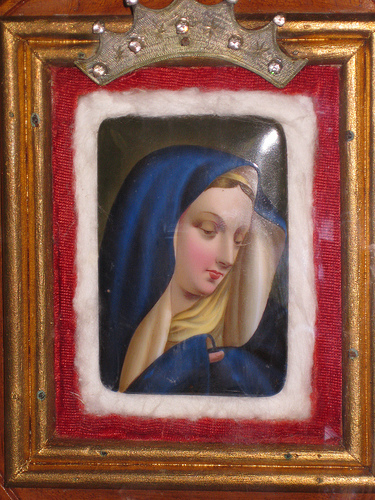
Closeup of the image

One afternoon before they went home, Pacio went near the same iba tree and there he saw again the stone with a picture. This time he put it in his pocket, and then started to go home. When he reached home, he kept the stone up between the nipa thatchings of their house. Early in the evening, his mother María, known to most as Bengge, was surprised by a shimmering light in their roof. She called Pacio and asked him to see what the light was; the boy obeyed and found out that it was the stone he had hid. His mother stored the image inside their trunk, which contained some of their clothes and valuables.

At this point, Bengge remembered that as she was in the fields with other villagers harvesting rice, she heard churchbells pealing loudly out of nowhere. She surmised that his happened the moment Pacio found the image. Sometime later, the Socao family started smelling an unidentifiable yet sweet odour. They later discovered that the fragrance was emanating from the trunk where the image was kept. They removed the image and enthroned it on their home altar. The picture started to radiate more beautifully, with her forehead prominently and partly covered by a blue white veil. A mole is sometimes seen on the forehead and many have seen the image wink. The lady has long eyelashes which made her even prettier. Natives of the place were ready to accept the apparition yet reluctant to openly manifest it, had it not been for the first wave of the pilgrims coming from the different coastal towns of Camarines and Albay. These people rode in sailing boats called parao. With them were sick people who were carried in hammocks. Asked why they came, they all answered, they were sick and they can only be healed by Maria. A middle aged woman, nicknamed “Bengge”, came to their houses to ask for alms and many forms of material aid, so she could start building an ermita in honor of “Our Lady of Sorrows” (Nuestra Señora de Dolor). The replay of the pilgrims surprised the natives for never had Bengge travelled far to reach the mainland, except the places within the confines of Calolbon.

== Devotion ==
Wave after the wave of people the normal, the infirmed and the sick from distant towns of Catanduanes and the mainland came bringing with them the nipa shingles rattan, money, rice, oil and animals like pigs, carabaos and many more. They prayed before the image of Our Lady of Sorrows, Pacio was asked to massage the afflicted parts of the sick people. Some got leaves, stem and branches, barks, and roots of Iba tree and used it as medicine. Many of them got cured and relieved. The relief and cure of the sick was evident. No doubt, to these people it was a miracle. For so many months, many sick went there and donations, as days passed is now enough to build a chapel on the spot where the miraculous picture was found. The place was at that time called Culapnit (now part of Batong Paloway). When the venerated miraculous image of Our Lady of Sorrows was enshrined there, another miracle happened. At the base of the iba tree (foot of the altar), there came out a spring of clear water. At that time, Iba tree was almost extinct down to its deepest roots and with no more parts of the tree to get as medicine, perhaps Our Lady of Sorrows could only explain the occurrence. The water from the spring was curative. There were instances of miracles experienced by those who came to the place where the miraculous picture was.

== Description ==
The picture of Our Lady of Sorrows looks like it was perfectly glued and laminated to a small hard stone, the other side with a flat surface. The picture seemed laminated and the texture is indeed smooth with glossy surface. The image is now properly encased in a glass frame and put in the ermita where devotees go and pray and offer Masses. Meanwhile, when the miracle of Our Lady of Sorrows was known far and wide, the family who found the image lived in abundance. They had tray of coins and baskets of donations, unfortunately, their wealth and abundance became their obsession, and they spent money for luxury. They even defied the order of the parish priest not to slaughter pigs and carabaos as it was the vigil of the Feast of Saints Peter and Paul. The priest was furious and ordered that the image should be brought to the town church and be enshrined there. Another miracle was when the image was brought to the town and presented to the priest in the convento. From nowhere, water dropped in front of the image of Our Lady of Sorrows, forming a cross.

== Current Devotion ==
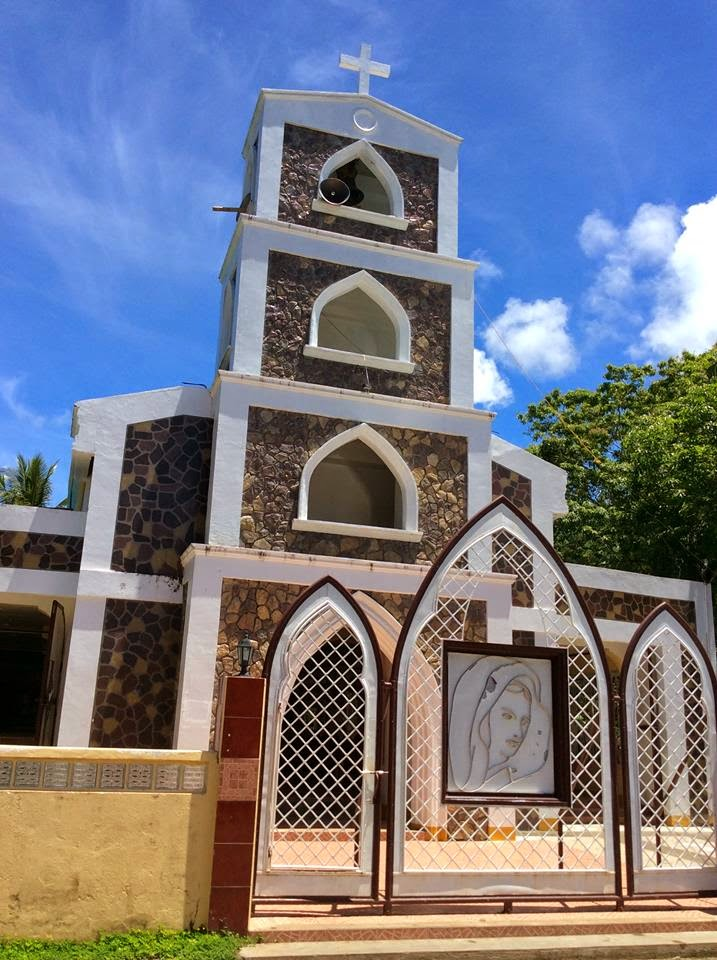
Our Lady of Sorrows Chapel, San Andres Catanduanes

The picture of Our Lady of Sorrows remained for a long time in the Parish Church. Only during the start of the Novena in preparation of the Barrio Fiesta that the venerated image of Nuestra Señora de los Dolores was permitted to be brought back at her original place with a condition to be returned after the “Celebra”. Even then, many people flocked to Batong Paloway during the feast day celebrated in December. The image was returned only during the term of Rev. Fr. Andres Tablizo in 1938-1941 upon the appeal of the natives of Batong Paloway. These people were insistent to get back their patroness, Our Lady of Sorrows for they experienced and witnessed bright rays of light coming from their altar at the chapel. This happened usually after six in the evening. These signs were enough to strengthen the natives’ rights to claim for their own patroness. The miracles perhaps of later times were only felt and received by those who came and prayed and favors were granted. However, in subsequent years, for many felt and received relief and thorough recovery, the devotion to Our Lady of Sorrows did not wane. Despite the absence of documented events and experiences on the miracles and favors granted to the faithful, still devotees flock to the place where she resides. Friday is the special day preferred for it was the day when the stone was found.

== Gallery ==
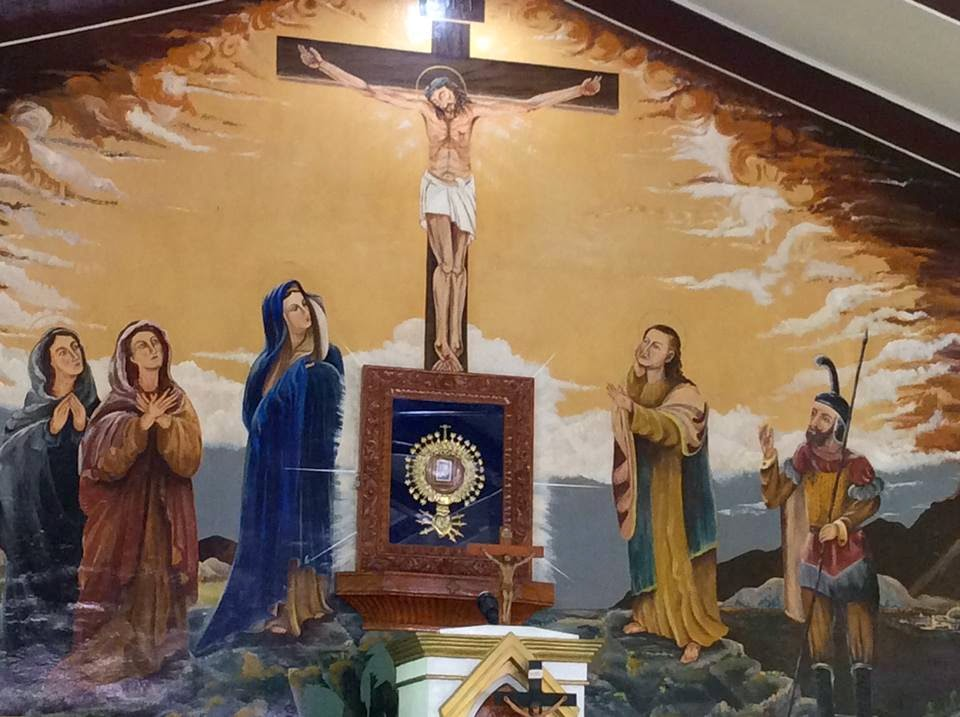
The Stone enshrined above the chapel altar, with a new mural behind it

== See also ==
- Our Lady of Sorrows
