= Diocese of Gikongoro =

Diocese of the Catholic Church in Rwanda

Coordinates: 2.4702°S 29.5654°E

Diocese of Gikongoro Dioecesis Ghikongoroënsis

Location
- Country: Rwanda
- Metropolitan: Kigali

Statistics
- Area: 2,057 km^{2} (794 sq mi)
- Population: Total; Catholics: (as of 2004); 537,580; 228,991 (42.6%)

Information
- Rite: Latin Rite

Current leadership
- Pope: Leo XIV
- Bishop: Célestin Hakizimana

Map
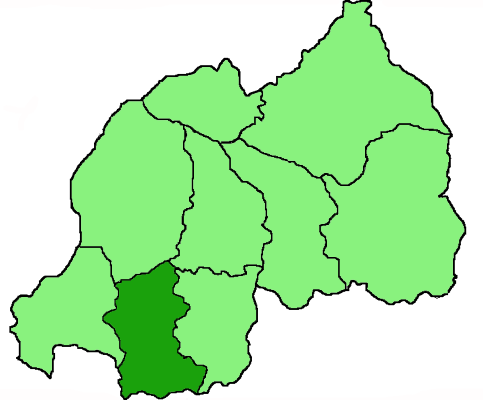

The Roman Catholic Diocese of Gikongoro (Latin: Ghikongoroën(sis)) is a diocese located in the city of Gikongoro in the ecclesiastical province of Kigali in Rwanda. The diocese is home to the parish of Kibeho, where there were reported apparitions of the Virgin Mary throughout the 1980s. A shrine celebrating the apparitions of Our Lady of Kibeho now stands at the site and serves as a place of pilgrimage. The diocese also includes large Catholic parishes at Kaduha and Cyanika. Gikongoro was historically the poorest province in Rwanda. Gikongoro is now part of South Province.

The first bishop to serve the diocese, Augustin Misago, was appointed in part because he had studied and written on the Kibeho apparitions when he served as Rector of the Grand Seminary of Nyakibanda. In 1999, the Rwandan government charged Bishop Misago with complicity in the 1994 genocide, and he spent 14 months in prison while his trial took place. He was ultimately acquitted in June 2000 and allowed to return to his functions as bishop.

== History ==
- March 30, 1992: Established as Diocese of Gikongoro from the Diocese of Butare

== Leadership ==
- Bishops of Gikongoro (Roman rite)
  - Augustin Misago (1992-2012)
  - Célestin Hakizimana (2015–present)

== See also ==
- Roman Catholicism in Rwanda
