= Stenjevec =

City district of Zagreb, Croatia

Coordinates: 45°48′19.37″N 15°52′39.14″E

- District of Zagreb
- Stenjevec as a part of Zagreb
- Country: Croatia
- County/City: Zagreb

Government
  - Council President: Ivan Zelenić (M!-SDP)
  - District Council: Composition (19): M!-SDP (10); HDZ-DP-HSU-HSS (3); Marija Selak Raspudić list (2); Only Croatia-DOMiNO-HS-Blok (2); Davor Bernardić list (1); Most-HSP (1)

Area
  - Total: 12.180 km^{2} (4.703 sq mi)

Population (2021)
  - Total: 53,862
  - Density: 4,422.2/km^{2} (11,453/sq mi)

Map

Stenjevec is one of the districts of Zagreb, Croatia. It is located in the western part of the city and has 61 000 inhabitants (as of 2011).

== List of neighborhoods in Stenjevec ==
- Jankomir
- Malešnica
- Donja Kustošija
- Stenjevec
- Špansko
- Vrapče-jug
