= Célestin Hakizimana =

Rwandan Catholic prelate (born 1956)

The Most Reverend Célestin Hakizimana
- Bishop of Gikongoro, Rwanda
- Church: Roman Catholic Church
- Archdiocese: Roman Catholic Archdiocese of Kigali
- Diocese: Roman Catholic Diocese of Gikongoro
- Appointed: 26 November 2014
- Installed: 24 January 2015
- Predecessor: Augustin Misago
- Successor: Incumbent

Orders
- Ordination: 21 July 1991
- Consecration: 24 January 2015 by Thaddée Ntihinyurwa

Personal details
- Born: 14 August 1963 (age 62) Kigali, Archdiocese of Kigali, Rwanda
- Denomination: Roman Catholic

Célestin Hakizimana (born 14 August 1963) is a Rwandan Catholic prelate. He serves as Bishop of the Roman Catholic Diocese of Gikongoro since 2014. He was appointed bishop on 26 November 2014 by Pope Francis. He contemporaneously was the Apostolic Administrator of the Roman Catholic Diocese of Cyangugu, Rwanda, from 16 March 2018 until 25 March 2021.

== Early years and education ==
He was born on 14 August 1963 in Kigali, Archdiocese of Kigali, in Rwanda. He attended elementary school in Jari “Sainte Famille” in Kigali. He then studied at Saint Vincent Minor Seminary Rulindo from 1977 until 1983 for his secondary school education. In 1983 he entered Ndera Major Seminary in Kigali, studying there until 1984. He continued his studies at the Rutongo Preparatory Seminary in the Archdiocese of Kigali. He then studied at Nyakibanda Major Seminary in the Diocese of Butare. Later, he studied at the Pontifical Theological Faculty of Southern Italy in Naples. He graduated with a Doctorate in Dogmatic Theology from the Faculty of St. Thomas, in Capodimonte (Naples), Italy.

== Priest ==
He was ordained a priest of the Roman Catholic Archdiocese of Kigali, Rwanda on 21 July 1991. He served in that capacity until 26 November 2014.

As a priest, he held various positions inside and outside his diocese including as:

- Vicar at the Rutongo Parish of the Archdiocese of Kigali from 1991 until 1992.
- Diocesan Representative of Catholic Education from 1992 until 1997.
- Director of the National Pastoral Center "Saint Paul" in Kigali from 1994 until 1996.
- Director of GEMECA Rwanda from 1998 until 2003.
- Secretary General of the Episcopal Conference of Rwanda from 2011 until 2014.

During the Rwanda Genocide of 1994, Father Célestin Hakizimana was the Parish Priest at Saint Paul Catholic Church in downtown Kigali City. He is credited with saving the lives of over 2,000 Tutsi refugees who had run to Saint Paul Church for sanctuary. Over a period of about 2 months, he housed, fed and protected them from the marauding Interahamwe.

== Bishop ==
On 26 November 2014 Pope Francis appointed him Bishop of Gikongoro Diocese. He was consecrated and installed at Gikongoro on 24 January 2015 by the hands of Archbishop Thaddée Ntihinyurwa, Archbishop of Kigali assisted by Bishop Smaragde Mbonyintege, Bishop of Kabgayi and Bishop Philippe Rukamba, Bishop of Butare. From 16 March 2018 until 25 March 2021 Bishop Célestin Hakizimana served as Apostolic Administrator of the Roman Catholic Diocese of Cyangugu, Rwanda. That administatorship ceased when Bishop Edouard Sinayobye was installed at Cyangugu as the Ordinary, on 25 March 2021.

== See also ==
- Catholic Church in Rwanda

== Succession table ==
Catholic Church titles
Preceded by Augustin Misago (30 March 1992 - 12 March 2012)	Bishop of Gikongoro (since 26 November 2014)	Succeeded by Incumbent
