= Dirty Dozen =

Dirty Dozen may refer to:

== Books, film and television ==
- The Dirty Dozen (book), 2008, a Cato Institute book by Robert A. Levy and William Mellor about twelve Supreme Court decisions
- The Dirty Dozen, a 1967 war film based on a 1965 novel by E.M. Nathanson
- The Dirty Dozen: Next Mission, a 1985 made-for-TV film
- The Dirty Dozen: The Deadly Mission, a 1987 made-for-TV film
- The Dirty Dozen: The Fatal Mission, a 1988 made-for-TV film
- The Dirty Dozen (filmmaking), a group of American filmmakers who attended the USC School of Cinematic Arts during the 1960s

== Music ==
- Dirty Dozen Brass Band, a New Orleans jazz band
- D12, also known as The Dirty Dozen, a Detroit hip-hop group
- A song recorded by Jelly Roll Morton on The Complete Library of Congress Recordings
- "The Dirty Dozens", noted recordings by Speckled Red

=== Albums ===
- The Dirty Dozen (album), by George Thorogood and the Destroyers
- Dirty Dozen (album) by Hugh Cornwell
- Bonkers 12: The Dirty Dozen, a compilation album
- A 2000 hip-hop album by Push Button Objects

== Other uses ==
- The Human Factors "Dirty Dozen" refers to twelve of the most common human error preconditions, or conditions that can act as precursors, to accidents or incidents.
- Dirty Dozens, a game where participants insult each other until one gives up
- Dirty Dozen (American football), a group of Dallas Cowboys players drafted in 1975
- Dirty Dozen (bicycle competition), a bicycle competition in Pittsburgh, Pennsylvania, featuring 13 steep hills
- Dirty dozen (Stockholm Convention), a group of twelve persistent organic pollutants (POPs)
- Dirty Dozen Motorcycle Club, an outlaw motorcycle club in Arizona
- A research and advocacy project of the Environmental Working Group
- World War II nickname of the American 12th Fighter Squadron

== See also ==
- Saddam's Dirty Dozen, a group of people who carried out the orders of Saddam Hussein
- Dirty Baker's Dozen or Sedition Caucus, US members of Congress who voted against certification of the 2020 presidential election
- E. M. Nathanson, author of the novel The Dirty Dozen
- Filthy Thirteen, US Army company that inspired the novel
- Wolf Island (novel), a horror fantasy novel featuring a team of soldiers called the "Dirty Dozen"
- Penelope Garcia, character in the Criminal Minds television series called "Dirty Dozen" in one episode
- Game of Shame, 1983 All-Ireland football championship during which the Dublin team was called "The Dirty Dozen"
- USA men's national basketball team, nicknamed "Dirty Dozen" during the 1998 World Championship
- League of Conservation Voters, American conservation group that targets a "Dirty Dozen" politicians each year
- Waterproof wristlet watch, military watches made by 12 manufacturers
- Dark Triad Dirty Dozen, psychological inventory
