= Baker's dozen (disambiguation) =

A baker's dozen is 13 items, rather than the 12 items in a standard dozen.

Baker's Dozen may also refer to:

== Film and television ==
- Baker's Dozen (TV series), a 1982 American sitcom
- "Baker's Dozen" (Orange Is the New Black), a 2019 TV episode
- Baker's Dozen, a 2021 Hulu original program
- Baker's Dozen, a film by Margy Kinmonth

== Music ==
- Baker's Dozen, a 1950s jazz group led by Kenny Baker
- Baker's Dozen, a 1995 album by Enda Kenny
- The Baker's Dozen (residency), a 2017 concert series by Phish

== Other uses ==
- Baker's Dozen (solitaire), a card game
- The Baker's Dozen, a poetry collection by George Edward Tait
