= Augustin Misago =

Rwandan Roman Catholic bishop

- Bishop of Gikongoro
- Church: Catholic Church
- Diocese: Diocese of Gikongoro
- In office: 30 March 1992 – 12 March 2012
- Predecessor: Diocese erected
- Successor: Célestin Hakizimana

Orders
- Ordination: 25 July 1971
- Consecration: 28 June 1992 by Jozef Tomko

Personal details
- Born: 1943 Ruvune (southeast of Byumba), Kingdom of Rwanda, mandatory Territory of Ruanda-Urundi, Belgian Empire
- Died: 12 March 2012 (aged 68–69)

Augustin Misago (1943 – 12 March 2012) was the Roman Catholic bishop of the Diocese of Gikongoro, Rwanda.

Ordained in 1971, Misango was named bishop in 1992. In the aftermath of the Rwandan genocide, he was accused of helping the Rwandan government commit war crimes during the mid-1990s, during which time over 800,000 Tutsi people were slaughtered. He was cleared of the charges in 2000.

Misago later died in office on 12 March 2012.

== Our Lady of Kibeho ==
Misago is known as the bishop who submitted a declaration that the Marian apparation at Kibeho was worthy of belief. In part he stated:

“Yes, the Virgin Mary appeared at Kibeho on November 28, 1981, and in the months that followed. There are more reasons to believe in the Apparitions than to deny them... The Apparitions of Kibeho are now officially recognized... The name given to the Marian sanctuary at Kibeho is "Shrine of Our Lady of Sorrows".

“That Kibeho become a place of pilgrimage and of encounter for all who seek Christ and who come there to pray, a fundamental centre of conversion, of reparation for the sins of the world and of reconciliation, a point of meeting for all who were dispersed, as for those who aspire to the values of compassion and fraternity without borders, a fundamental centre that recalls the Gospel of the Cross.

“This Declaration makes it possible to respond to the expectations of the People of God and to bring new enthusiasm to the public devotion recognized already for 13 years”.
