= Došen Duliba =

- Village
- Location within Croatia
- Coordinates: 44°33′N 15°10′E
- Country: Croatia

Population (2011)
  - Total: 0
- Time zone: UTC+1 (CET)
  - Summer (DST): UTC+2 (CEST)

Došen Duliba is an uninhabited settlement in Croatia.
