= Vid Došen =

Vid Došen (1719–1778) was a Croatian poet and Catholic priest.

== Early life ==
He was born in Tribanj around 1719 to a well known immigrant Bunjevac family Došen, which was originally from Herzegovina. He became a priest in 1744, and subsequently learned the Glagolitic script so he could perform his duties in the parishes of the Diocese of Nin. He was then schooled in Križevci and Zagreb, transferring over to the Diocese of Zagreb. He served in Požega at first, where he also acted as professor at the academy there. After 1776, he went to Dubovik (Podcrkavlje), where he lived until his death on 6 April 1778.

== Works ==
In the spirit of enlightenment, Vid Došen is principally known for his two published works; Jeka planine (Echo of the Mountain), which he published anonymously, and Aždaja Sedmoglava (Seven headed Dragon), both were published in 1768, Zagreb. He wrote in the Slavonian dialect (Štokavian ikavian) of the area where he resided while also referring to himself as a 'Dalmatian of the Velebit sea' (Dalmatinom od mora velebitskoga).

Jeka Planine is a kind of pamphlet in octosyllabic verse, which stands in defence of Matija Antun Relković's satire Satir iliti divji čovik (1762) against an attack by a certain Tamburaš slavonski in 1767, who has not been identified. The work is divided in two parts, in which he insults the 'Tamburaš' and praises Relković's Satir in its critique of old customs.

Aždaja sedmoglava is a moralistic-didactic poem divided in seven parts representing each of the deadly sins, and, as with Jeka planine, it is written in octosyllabic verses. The poem begins with an allusion to a military mobilisation conducted by a trumpet, with the stated goal of defeating the seven-headed dragon in a battle, echoing the style of Catholic restoration. The principal intent of the poem is shaming public officials.
