= Spechbach =

Spechbach may refer to:

- Spechbach, Baden-Württemberg, a municipality in Germany
- Spechbach, Haut-Rhin, a commune in France
- Spechbach-le-Bas, a village and former commune in France
- Spechbach-le-Haut, a village and former commune in France
