= Rubya =

- Mission
- Location within Tanzania
- Coordinates: 1.752411°S 31.61773°E
- Country: Tanzania
- Region: Kagera
- Climate: Aw

Rubya (or Rubyia) is the site of a Catholic Church mission to the south of Bukoba near the west bank of Lake Victoria in Muleba District, Kagera Region, Tanzania. A seminary was established at Rubya in 1904, one of the first in German East Africa, as it then was. The seminary still operates. There is a cathedral, a nursing school and a district hospital, all operated by the church.

== Location ==
Rubya is in the Kagera Region of north-western Tanzania, at an elevation of about 1,500 metres (4,900 ft) above sea level. It is located on the edge of a sandstone escarpment with a view of Lake Victoria. The mission is about 20 kilometres (12 mi) from Muleba and 80 kilometres (50 mi) from Bukoba. The village of Nyakalembe is nearby, and provides shops and a Sunday market. The climate is mild, with temperatures in the 15 °C (59 °F) to 26 °C (79 °F) range. Annual precipitation is about 1,300 millimetres (51 in). The Rubya Seminary covers 1.3 square kilometres (0.50 sq mi).

== Seminary ==
In 1894 the Apostolic Vicariate of Victoria–Nyanza was split into the vicariates of Southern Victoria Nyanza, south of Lake Victoria, an eastern portion called "Upper Nile" that was given to the English Mill Hill Missionaries, and a northern portion called "Northern Nyanza" that covered the south and west of today's Uganda. John Joseph Hirth was appointed vicar Apostolic of Southern Victoria Nyanza, at that time part of German East Africa, on 13 July 1894. The junior seminary of Bukumbi was officially opened in 1903, and in 1904 was transferred first to Bukoba and then to Rubya, near the bishop's home. The St. Mary's Seminary opened in Rubya in November 1904.

Hirth was closely involved in the seminary program. According to some missionaries, training priests was more important to him than converting the people. Subjects included Latin, history, geography, writing, arithmetic, Gregorian chants and German. Hirth forbade all forms of physical punishment, humiliation or mockery of the students.

Hirth was increasingly interested in Rwanda, and starting in 1903 he brought many of the brightest Rwandan pupils to study at Rubya. In 1909 the major seminary was opened for pupils who had completed six years of the minor seminary. By 1911 there were 85 students at Rubya. Hirth moved to Rwanda in 1912, when the new Apostolic Vicariate of Kivu was formed, and Bishop Joseph Sweens became responsible for the Southern Victoria Nyanza vicariate and for the seminary. When a seminary was established in 1913 at Kabgayi in Rwanda, some of the students from Rubyia were transferred there. Thirty three seminarians in total returned to Rwanda, of whom eighteen were from the major seminary. The students, with a good understanding of Latin, found to their amusement that the old European priests were less than fluent in that language.

During World War I (1914-1918) the French White Fathers had to leave the seminary and return home, or find a more hospitable vicariate. In 1917 four priests were ordained at Rubya. Conditions deteriorated in the major seminary during the 1920s, with low morale and lack of discipline. In 1929 the major seminary was closed, and only the junior seminary continued. After his retirement, Sweens lived at Rubya among the seminarians until his death in 1950.

The first African rector of the seminary was Joseph Benedict Labre, who took office in 1961. 2,930 students had attended the junior seminary by 2004. Of these, 265 had become priests, seven had become bishops and one had been made a cardinal. As of 2004 there were 140 seminarians and 15 teachers. The junior seminary mainly relied for income on fees of US$120 per student per year, supplemented by some income from small-scale farming and a declining subsidy from Rome.

== Facilities ==
Rubya Hospital, which serves the district of Muleba, was opened in 1956. The hospital was founded by Laurean Rugambwa, then Bishop of Rutabo and later the first African cardinal of modern times. The future cardinal had received his secondary school education at the Rubya junior seminary. The hospital can provide basic medical services, and has an airstrip. In 1990 the hospital was having difficulty handling the growing number of HIV/AIDS patients, and realized there was a need for counselling patients and their families as well as providing clinical care. They contacted WAMATA, a self-help organization for people with AIDS, obtained support from an international donor, and in June 1991 started a pioneer program for home-based care. Village health workers are a key element of the program, all people with AIDS who have been trained in home care and in managing the illness. As of June 2011 the hospital was suffering from severe shortages of staff, equipment and supplies.

Apart from the hospital, seminary and cathedral, there is a school of nursing. These are all operated by the diocese. In 2011 the school of nursing had ten teachers and 113 pupils. There are three primary schools, a secondary school and vocational schools for carpenters, mechanics and builders. Rubya also has a post office. Fifteen minutes walk to the south there is a mosque and a Lutheran church.
