= Joseph Sweens =

Joseph Francis Marie Sweens, M. Afr.
- Vicar Apostolic of Victoria-Nyanza
- Installed: 15 January 1915
- Term ended: 15 November 1928
- Predecessor: John Joseph Hirth
- Successor: Anton Oomen
- Other posts: Vicar Apostolic of Southern Nyanza (12 December 1912 – 15 January 1915); Coadjutor Vicar Apostolic of South Nyanza (1 January 1910 –12 December 1912); Titular Bishop of Capsa (1 January 1910 – 12 April 1950)

Orders
- Ordination: 3 June 1882
- Consecration: 20 January 1910 by Bishop Wilhelmus van de Ven

Personal details
- Born: 22 March 1858 's-Hertogenbosch, North Brabant, Netherlands
- Died: 12 April 1950 (aged 92) Rubya, West Lakes Region, Tanganyika Territory
- Denomination: Catholic

Joseph Francis Marie Sweens (22 March 1858 – 12 April 1950), was a Dutch Roman Catholic missionary bishop who served as the Vicar Apostolic of South Nyanza in German East Africa, later in the British-administered Tanganyika Territory, now Tanzania.

== Early years ==
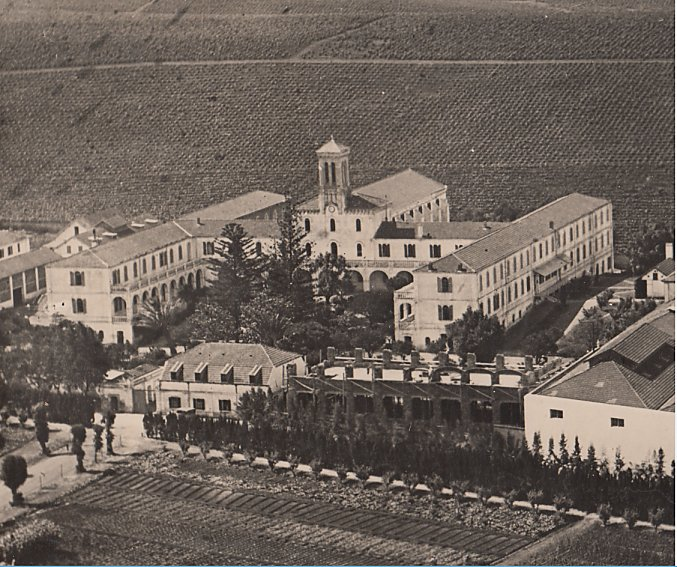
Maison-Carrée

Sweens was born in 's-Hertogenbosch, in the Netherlands, on 22 March 1858. He attended a seminary in his diocese, and was ordained a priest on 3 April 1882. He was pastor first of the parish of Lierop, then the parish of Vught, where he heard of Charles Lavigerie and his missionaries and decided to join the White Fathers (Society of the Missionaries of Africa). He was admitted as a novice in 1889, and became a White Father on 22 September 1891. In 1891 he was appointed Director of the lay brothers at Maison-Carrée, Algiers. He was later assigned to training brothers in Europe.

== Missionary ==
In 1901 Sweens was appointed to the Apostolic Vicariate of Unyanyembe. He worked in Burundi, then part of that vicariate, until 1905. He was then appointed regional visitor to the apostolic vicariates of South Nyanza, North Nyanza and Unyanyembe. He returned to Europe to participate in the society's general chapter in 1906, and was named superior of the Boxtel training school for missionaries in the Netherlands.

Sweens was appointed coadjutor bishop to Mgr. Jean-Joseph Hirth, of South Nyanza, on 17 December 1909. In January 1910 Sweens was appointed titular bishop of Capsa. He was ordained bishop in 's-Hertogenbosch on 20 January 1910 and returned to South Nyanza in April 1910. Hirth returned to his old residence at Kashozi, leaving Sweens to live at the seminary of Rubya. For the next three years Sweens visited the different stations of the diocese, resolved problems and represented the diocese to the civil authorities.

== Vicar Apostolic ==
In 1912 the missions of Burundi, formerly part of the Vicariate of Unyanyembe, were joined with the missions of Rwanda to form the new Apostolic Vicariate of Kivu, with Hirth as the first vicar apostolic. South Nyanza now consisted only of the regions of Bukoba and Mwanza to the south of Lake Victoria. On 12 December 1912 Sweens succeeded Hirth as vicar apostolic of South Nyanza. On 15 January 1915 the territory was renamed the Vicariate Apostolic of Victoria-Nyanza (now the Archdiocese of Mwanza).

The vicariate was severely disrupted during World War I (1914–18). In June 1915 Sweens was in the entrance of the church of Bukoba when the British fired a shell at the roof during a raid on Bukoba, which exploded on the spot where Sweens had been standing a moment before. (Note: Hastily built churches could be dangerous even in peacetime. In 1928, Sweens was saying his breviary in the church at Rutabo when it collapsed on him. He dived under a prie-dieu, and was unhurt.) British forces occupied Bukoba in June 1916 and Mwanza in July 1916. Fighting in the south continued until the armistice in 1918, but from mid-1916 South Nyanza was under British control. In 1917 Sweens ordained the first four priests at Rubya.

During the 1920s discipline broke down in the major seminary at Rubya. Sweens was constantly traveling between the vicariate missions, and delegated all authority to the teachers at the seminary. Apparently he was not aware of the problems. Eventually an inquiry was launched that resulted in dividing the vicariate and dissolving the major seminary. Exhausted by the work, Sweens submitted his resignation in 1928, and this was accepted the same year. He left office on 15 November 1928. In April 1929 Sweens' former vicariate was divided into two more manageable units, the vicariates of Bukoba and Mwanza. After his retirement, Sweens stayed on at Rubya until his death. He died on 12 April 1950.

== Sources ==
- Cheney, David M. (28 January 2013). "Bishop Joseph Francis Marie Sweens, M. Afr". Catholic Hierarchy.
- Gahungu, Méthode (2007). Former les prêtres en Afrique: Le rôle des Pères Blancs (1879–1936). l'Harmattan. p. 186. ISBN 978-2-296-04471-5.
- MacErlean, Andrew Alphonsus (1912). "Vicariate Apostolic of Southern Victoria Nyanza" . Catholic Encyclopedia. Vol. 15.
- "Prelates of Mwanza". The Archdiocese of Mwanza. Archived from the original on 2011-11-27.
- Shorter, Aylward (2011-12-01). Les Pères Blancs au temps de la conquête coloniale: Histoire des Missionnaires d'Afrique (1892-1914). KARTHALA Editions. ISBN 978-2-8111-0575-4.
- Strachan, Hew (2001-04-26). The First World War: Volume I: To Arms. Oxford University Press. p. 688. ISBN 978-0-19-160834-6.
