= Laurent-François Déprimoz =

Laurent-François Déprimoz M. Afr.
- Vicar Apostolic of Kabgayi
- Installed: 14 February 1952
- Term ended: 15 April 1955
- Predecessor: Léon-Paul Classe, M. Afr.
- Successor: André Perraudin, M. Afr.
- Other posts: Titular Bishop of Mathara in Proconsulari (19 March 1943 - 5 April 1962); Vicar Apostolic of Ruanda (31 January 1945 – 14 February 1952),

Orders
- Ordination: 28 June 1908
- Consecration: 19 March 1943 by Giovanni Battista Dellepiane

Personal details
- Born: 13 June 1884 Chindrieux, France
- Died: 5 April 1962 (aged 77)
- Denomination: Catholic

Laurent-François Déprimoz, M. Afr. (13 June 1884 – 5 April 1962) was a Catholic priest who was Vicar Apostolic of the Apostolic Vicariate of Ruanda and then of the Apostolic Vicariate of Kabgayi.

== Early years ==
Laurent-François Déprimoz was born on 13 June 1884 in Chindrieux, Savoy, France. He was the cousin of Joanny Thévenoud, Vicar Apostolic of Ouagadougou. Deprimoz attended the college at Rumilly for his secondary education, then at the age of seventeen entered the seminary of the White Fathers at Binson. He took the habit at Maison-Carrée on 4 October 1903 and pursued his studies at Carthage, interrupted by military service, until being ordained a priest on 28 June 1908.

Déprimoz was first assigned to the mission of Unyaneyembe in the Tabora Region of what is now Tanzania, but could not handle the climate. In 1909 he was transferred to the Buhonga mission, close to Lake Tanganyika, in the healthier mountains of Burundi. On 12 December 1912 the missions of Burundi were detached from the Apostolic Vicariate of Unyanyembe and were joined with those of Rwanda to form the new Apostolic Vicariate of Kivu, with John Joseph Hirth as the first Vicar Apostolic. Déprimoz met Léon-Paul Classe in 1913 when Classe visited in his role as vicar delegate of the south of the Apostolic Vicariate of Kivu. In October 1915 Déprimoz became a teacher at the Junior Seminary at Kabgayi in Rwanda. On 26 November 1919 he was named Superior of the Junior Seminary.

== Later career ==
Déprimoz left the country for leave in Europe on 13 September 1921. He returned to Rwanda on 7 September 1922 with Léon-Paul Classe, who had been named the first Vicar Apostolic of the new Apostolic Vicariate of Ruanda. He was made superior of the junior seminary, and spiritual father of the major seminary. In 1927 he became inspector of schools in Rwanda. On 1 October 1930 he was released from the junior seminary and named the Vicar Delegate of Bishop Classe. On 8 September 1932 he was named Superior of the major "intervicarial" seminary of Kabgayi. On 9 July 1936 this seminary was officially transferred to Nyakibanda, and Déprimoz was confirmed in his position as rector. He was named Coadjutor Vicar Apostolic in January 1943.

== Bishop ==
Déprimoz was appointed Titular Bishop of Mathara in Proconsulari and Coadjutor Vicar Apostolic of Ruanda on 12 January 1943. On 19 March 1943 he was ordained at Kabgayi. On 31 January 1945 he succeeded Classe as Vicar Apostolic of Ruanda. He inherited a difficult situation partly caused by missionaries who had been indiscriminate in baptizing people who were drawn to the church during the famine of 1933–35. He made changes to religious teaching practices and gave fresh emphasis to the sanctity of the Sabbath. In 1950, on the fiftieth anniversary of the Catholic Church in Rwanda, he held a synod to discuss completing the restoration of the church in preparation for transferring responsibility to African clergy with the separation of the Apostolic Vicariate of Nyundo. His greatest work was his reorganization of the catechumenate during the Synod of 1950.

On 14 February 1952 the Apostolic Vicariate of Ruanda was divided into the Apostolic Vicariate of Kabgayi and Nyundo. Déprimoz was appointed Vicar Apostolic of Kabgayi. The new Vicariate of Nyundo was assigned to Mgr. Aloys Bigirumwami, whom Déprimoz ordained on 1 June 1952 during the feast of the Pentecost. Déprimoz was a strong promoter of the Catholic press, pushing up the circulation of the Kinyamateka, and supporting the launch of the Hobe magazine for young readers in Christmas 1954. Déprimoz became ill, and resigned his duties on 15 April 1955. After a stay in Europe, in 1958 he returned to Rwanda and settled at Astrida (Butare). He died on 5 April 1962.¨
