= Léon-Paul Classe =

Catholic bishop (1874–1945)

Léon-Paul Classe MAfr
- Vicar Apostolic of the Apostolic Vicariate of Ruanda
- Installed: 10 April 1922
- Term ended: 31 January 1945
- Predecessor: John Joseph Hirth
- Successor: Laurent-François Déprimoz
- Other post: Titular Bishop of Maxula Prates (26 April 1922–31 January 1945)

Orders
- Ordination: 31 March 1900 by Léon Livinhac
- Consecration: 28 May 1922 by Désiré-Joseph Mercier

Personal details
- Born: 28 June 1874 Metz, France
- Died: 31 January 1945 (aged 70) Usumbura, Ruanda-Urundi
- Denomination: Catholic

Léon-Paul Classe, M.Afr. (28 June 1874 – 31 January 1945) was a Catholic priest who was Vicar Apostolic of the Apostolic Vicariate of Ruanda, in what is now Rwanda, from 1922 until his death in 1945. During his time as a missionary priest and then bishop a great many Rwandans were converted to Christianity. Classe was influential in persuading the Belgian colonial administration to favor the Tutsis as a ruling caste in the country over the Hutu majority.

== Early years ==
Léon-Paul Classe was born on 28 June 1874 in Metz, France. When he was aged six his family moved to Paris. For his secondary education he attended Saint-Nicolas-du-Chardonnet and then the junior seminary of Versailles. He went to the major seminary of Issy-les-Moulineux to study philosophy. In 1896 he was accepted into the White Fathers (Society of the Missionaries of Africa). On 31 March 1900 he was ordained a priest by Léon Livinhac, the Superior General of the Society. Several months later he was sent to John Joseph Hirth, Vicar Apostolic of Southern Nyanza, as an assistant.

== Missionary ==
Classe was one of the first two missionaries to be sent to Rwanda. The ruler, King Musinga, was at first hostile to his mission. Later, Classe was allowed to make many converts. In Rwanda he helped found the missions of Nyundo and Rwaza (north). In 1907 Hirth named him delegate vicar general in Rwanda., On 12 December 1912, Jean-Joseph Hirth was appointed the first Vicar Apostolic of Kivu, which covered modern Rwanda and Burundi. Hirth named Classe his vicar general in Rwanda.

Classe was an admirer of the Tutsi elite, whom he considered natural rulers of the country. In Classe's view, the political structure of Rwanda was much like the feudal structure of the Middle Ages in Europe. As a presumed expert on the country, his 1916 paper on the political organization had great influence on the thinking of the Belgian administration, which came to support the leadership position of the Tutsis.

In 1920, when the territories of German East Africa were being divided by the victors of World War I, there was debate between the Belgians and British over the boundaries of Rwanda. The Belgian colonial authorities asked Hirth for a study of the effect of ceding part of the east of the country to the British, and Hirth delegated the task to Classe. Classe gave his work to the colonial authorities before leaving Rwanda for Algeria on 20 August 1920. His work, full of praise for the unique African country with its Tutsi aristocracy, was submitted as a memorandum to the British in March 1922. It was influential in preventing the partition of the country.

== Bishop ==
Classe was recalled in 1920 due to disagreements among the missionaries over how much they should be involved in politics. In Europe, his superiors became fully confident in his capability, and his assistance in the question of the eastern boundaries gained him the support of the Belgian colonial ministry. The Apostolic Vicariate of Ruanda was created on 25 April 1922 from the northern part of the former Apostolic Vicariate of Kivu, serving the territory of what is now Rwanda. Classe was appointed Vicar Apostolic of Ruanda on 10 April 1922, and on 26 April 1922 was appointed Titular Bishop of Maxula Prates.

Classe remained a committed supporter of the Tutsi ruling class. In a letter to the resident Belgian commissioner on 21 September 1927 he said that the young Tutsis would be a great help in helping the colony advance. The Hutus would much rather receive orders from the Tutsi nobles than from commoners, he claimed. In 1930 he again said that suppressing the Tutsi caste would cause great damage, leading to anarchy and viciously anti-European communism. He felt the Tutsis were intelligent, active, and able to understand progressive ideas.

Classe played an important role in the deposition of King Yuhi V Musinga in 1931 and in the choice of his successor, Mutara III Rudahigwa, who was a Catholic catechist at the time. By 1943, all but two of the 52 chiefs of Rwanda were Christian. That year , Classe baptized King Mutara III Rudahigwa in a ceremony attended by the chiefs. Classe also designed many of the church buildings in Rwanda.

Classe died in Bujumbura, Burundi, on 31 January 1945 and was succeeded by Laurent-François Déprimoz. Classe was interred in what was then the cathedral of Kabgayi.
