= Antonin Guillermain =

French Catholic missionary in Uganda

Antonin Guillermain M. Afr.
- Vicar Apostolic of Northern Victoria Nyanza
- Installed: 12 January 1895
- Term ended: 14 July 1896
- Predecessor: Jean-Joseph Hirth
- Successor: Henri Streicher
- Other post: Titular Bishop of Thabraca (12 January 1895 - 14 July 1896)

Orders
- Ordination: 23 September 1887
- Consecration: 28 October 1895 by Bishop Henry Hanlon

Personal details
- Born: 1 January 1861 Lyon, France
- Died: 14 July 1896 (aged 35)

Antonin Guillermain (1 January 1861 – 14 July 1896) was a Catholic missionary who was Vicar Apostolic of Northern Nyanza in what is now Uganda from January 1895 until his death in July 1896.

== Early years ==
Antonin Guillermain was born on 1 January 1861 in Lyon, France. He became a novice of the White Fathers on 3 September 1883, and was ordained as a priest on 23 September 1887. His first assignment was as personal secretary to Cardinal Charles Lavigerie, the leader of the society. He was then assigned to missionary work in Central Africa.

== Missionary ==
Guillermain left Marseille on 17 July 1888 destined for Zanzibar, with Léonce Bridoux, Vicar Apostolic of Tanganyika, and five other missionaries. He was to remain in Zanzibar, replacing a missionary who had been assigned to Nyanza. He went on to Nyanza in September 1890, where he was assigned to the Rubaga mission, near Kampala. He was briefly held prisoner during the 1892 civil war between supporters of the Anglicans and the Catholics. At the end of May 1892 he and two other missionaries founded the mission of Notre-Dame de l'Equateur at Buddu, opposite the large island of Sissé in the north of Lake Victoria. Shortly afterwards he returned to Rubaga.

== Bishop ==
The Apostolic Vicariate of Victoria Nyanza was divided into three parts in 1894. Bishop John Joseph Hirth took the Apostolic Vicariate of Southern Nyanza, the English Mill Hill Missionaries took the eastern part, called the Apostolic Vicariate of Upper Nile, and Antonin Guillermain was assigned the western part, called the Apostolic Vicariate of Northern Nyanza, now the Roman Catholic Archdiocese of Kampala. On 12 January 1895 Guillermain was appointed Titular Bishop of Thabraca and Vicar Apostolic of Northern Victoria Nyanza. Guillermain moved the seminary from Rubaga to Kisubi on Lake Victoria in 1895. He was ordained as bishop on 28 October 1895. He died on 14 July 1896. His unexpected death was caused by a Viral hemorrhagic fever. The next year Henri Streicher was appointed his successor.

== Sources ==
- Annales de la propagation de la foi. Society for the Propagation of the Faith. 1888. p. 418.
- Cheney, David M. (8 September 2012). "Bishop Antonin Guillermain, M. Afr". Catholic Hierarchy.
- Shorter, Aylward (2003). "Bishop Streicher, Henri 1863 to 1952". Missionaries of Africa. Archived from the original on 2011-11-18.
- Gadille, Jacques (1994). "GUILLERMAIN Antonin". In de Montclos, Xavier (ed.). Lyon, le Lyonnais, le Beaujolais. Dictionnaire du monde religieux dans la France contemporaine. Éditions Beauchesne. ISBN 978-2-7010-1305-3.
- Shorter, Aylward (2011-12-01). Les Pères Blancs au temps de la conquête coloniale: Histoire des Missionnaires d'Afrique (1892-1914). KARTHALA Editions. ISBN 978-2-8111-0575-4.
