= Ann Fox =

American nun (1933–2023)

Sister Jeralee Ann Fox (December 16, 1933 – August 30, 2023) was an American Roman Catholic sister, social activist and expert in educational enrichment. She was co-founder and previous executive director of the Paraclete Foundation. She teamed with Barry T. Hynes to create the Paraclete Foundation to provide educational enrichment for at-risk children in South Boston. The Paraclete Foundation, along with South Boston mothers known as the Stella Maris Group created the Paraclete Academy in 1997. The academy is housed in the former St. Augustine's convent. The Paraclete Academy focuses on elementary and early middle school aged, at-risk children. The Paraclete Academy provides after school enrichment programs in the South Boston community that aims to erase the education disparity between inner city children and their more affluent peers. By Sister Ann's retirement as executive director in 2012, nearly 1,000 local children had participated in the Paraclete Academy's programs and over 70 young college graduates had volunteered as full-time teachers in residence.

== Early life ==
Sister Ann was born in Jackson, Michigan in 1933 and grew up in rural Scio Township outside of Ann Arbor where she attended public schools. After graduation from the University of Michigan, where she had converted to Catholicism, she moved to New York City in 1955 which at the time was a center of Catholic intellectual life and social activism. Her interest in social activism sprouted early. She studied Social Work at Fordham University and worked at the Kennedy Child Care Center serving special needs children as a social worker until taking vows with the Sisters of Charity.

In 1961 she entered Sisters of Charity. The order focused on serving the poor, offering Sister Ann the perfect opportunity to combine her two great passions: Catholicism and social activism. Sister Ann's time as a Sister of Charity ended in 1970. At the time she was in Boston heading a social work clinic in the now closed Nazareth Home for Children which was a mission of the Daughters of Charity. Sister Ann was supportive of the Second Vatican Council's call for renewal of religious life and saw it as a “freeing opportunity for the sisters to live and work more closely with the communities they served. Sister Ann decided to take advantage of an ancient rite of the early Church for consecration of virgins that was restored by Vatican II, and in 1974 was consecrated by Humberto Cardinal Mediros of Boston and sent forth to become a sister living in the world, supporting herself, and ministering in the community.

== Boston ==
Sister Ann led and participated in numerous non-profits in Boston, beginning with the Nazareth Childcare Center in Jamaica Plain from 1966 through 1969. Next she would work as a community social worker at the Martha Eliot Health Center at the Bromley Heath housing development.

While at the Bromley- Heath housing development where she lived in an apartment like the residents she served. At the development, she began at the request of the women there, one of the first training and education programs for welfare mothers. From 1971 through 1988 she was an investigator on child abuse research with Lumen Vitae Inc.

In 1988 she was asked to become Executive Director of the South Boston Neighborhood House It was here that she established a reputation for her dedication and commitment to the South Boston community. During her eight-year tenure there, working with the Chair of the Board of Directors, Frank McCourt (executive), she oversaw the construction of its present building, which included an old-fashioned barn raising bringing many unions in for the day to put up the two-story building.

Also beginning in 1988 she served as the President of Stella Maris Inc, a non-profit supporting South Boston. Eventually she would co-found the Paraclete which provided educational enrichment programming to more than 1,000 neighborhood children until it closed in 2022.

== Rwanda ==
While attending the first gathering of Women Waging Peace, Sister Ann met Aloisea Inyumba, who was then governor of one of the poorest areas in Rwanda, Kigali-Ngali province, whose Tutsi population was decimated in the 1994 Rwandan genocide. As a poor refugee growing up in Uganda who had the opportunity to attend an excellent girls’ school, Governor Inyumba knew the impact that the education of girls can make on the development of a nation. She asked Sr. Ann's help to build a leadership school in Rwanda that poor girls could attend.

In 2002 Sister Ann met Hon. Inyumba in Rwanda to plan their strategy for launching the school.

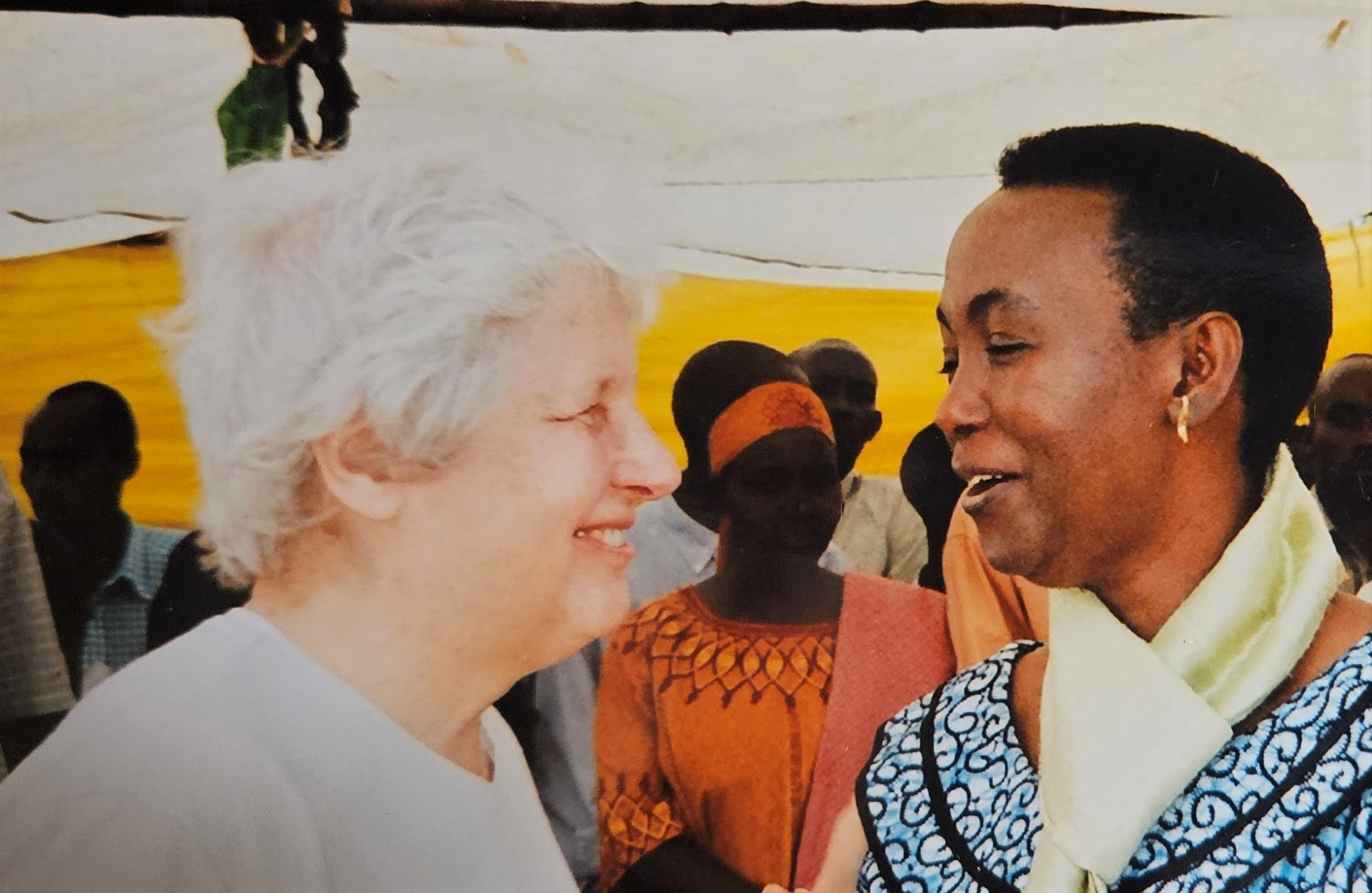

Governor Inyumba  secured  land in Nyamata while Sister Ann secured architects. They were able to secure the Benebikira Sisters of Rwanda as a partner to help set up and administer the school. Fundraising efforts were linked to  taking groups of Americans interested in international development to Rwanda. In 2006 the Maranyundo Initiative was created by a group of Boston women who made such a trip; they took on responsibility to finish fundraising for the school's construction and now  continue to support the school.[4] Ownership was turned over to the Benebikira sisters in 2010.

The Maranyundo School opened in February 2008 with an initial class of 60 girls. In just three years it established a reputation for excellence. The first graduating class ranked #1 in girls schools and third overall in the national “O” level exams. Its second graduating class ranked 2nd, and its 3rd graduating class (2012) ranked #1 in the country. Through her work in Rwanda, Sister Ann is closely associated with the Benebikira Sisters, a native Rwandan congregation that focuses on the poor, especially women and children in Rwanda, Burundi, Uganda and Kenya. She has helped them develop partnerships with Babson College and Lesley University for education exchange.

In early 2023 Sister Ann founded her final non-profit, Rwandan Women Rising, dedicated to supporting the Benebikira Sisters and their works. She died in Rwanda on August 30, 2023, at the age of 89.

== Recognition ==
While it was not her goal, Sister Ann was recognized for her work especially in Boston. In 2008 she accepted the Harvard Friends of Education Award. She was recognized by Team Heart in 2011 and on November 7, 2012 she received a Heros Among Us award.
