= Theresa J. Kaijage =

HIV researcher

Theresa J. Kaijage (born 1947) is a social worker who advocates for those infected with HIV/AIDS in Tanzania. Kaijage works to raise awareness about the disease and tries to assuage the negative social implications that accompany the diagnosis of HIV/AIDS in Africa.Theresia Kaijage is also the founder and director of the Tanzanian non-governmental organization, WAMATA, which educates and provides counseling services to those with HIV/AIDS.

== Education and career ==
At the University of Dar es Salaam, Tanzania, Kaijage received a Bachelor of Arts in education in 1978. She then went on to receive a master's degree in Social work from the George Warren Brown School of Social Work at Washington University in St. Louis in 1985. In 2004, Kaijage got her PhD in Social Work and Masters of Public Health from the University of Pittsburgh School of Social Work.

Kaijage began her career as a school teacher in Tanzania and from there she became a Fulbright Scholar. After losing many friends and family members to HIV/AIDS, Kaijage saw a trend in the familial and social ostracism that accompanied the grim diagnosis. It was then that the vision of WAMATA emerged. Kaijage now dedicates her life to those with HIV/AIDS. She became a vital component in the battle to educate and trying to reduce the spread of HIV/AIDS in Africa. Kaijage was especially important during the Joint United Nations Programme on HIV/AIDS (UNAIDS) summit. During the UNAIDS summit, Kaijage proposed that mothers who are HIV positive should not breastfeed, but they should find alternate methods of feeding their infant. This caused great stir among the world health leaders who advocate that breastfeeding is the best way to feed infants in developing nations, even if the mother is HIV positive. This did not resonate well with Kaijage and she tried very hard to change this. In 1997, UNICEF and the WHO changed the guidelines on breastfeeding. Now mothers with HIV should avoid breastfeeding only when alternate means of nourishing the infant is acceptable, feasible, safe, affordable and sustainable.

== WAMATA ==
WAMATA is a Swahili acronym for the phrase "Walio Katika Mapambano Na AIDS Tanzania" which means "People in the fight against AIDS in Tanzania". Kaijage opened her home to a young woman, infected with HIV and her child who was not infected. Kaijage observed that breastfeeding took a lot of energy from the mother; she would get out of breath and pass out. Kaijage would frequently have to rush her to the emergency room. Kaijage and the mother she took in sought out alternatives to breast milk. After the mother stopped breastfeeding, she became much healthier. She had more energy; she thrived and the baby thrived. This is what catalyzed Kaijage to invest all of her energy into WAMATA. A main goal of WAMATA is to empower women with their reproductive rights, as well as to provide information on mother-to-child transmission of HIV. Through counselling sessions offered by WAMATA, infected women learn about the risks of breastfeeding and alternative feeding methods, such as spoon feeding beans and juices, to ensure the long-lasting health of the child. With WAMATA, Kaijage seeks to "break down the barriers in health care by bringing AIDS care to the homes of those unable to leave their beds." The organization has received funding from the Clinton Foundation and the Global Fund.
