= Rutabo =

- Mission
- Location within Tanzania
- Coordinates: 1.56667°S 31.61667°E
- Country: Tanzania
- Region: Kagera

Rutabo is the location of a Catholic mission in German East Africa, to the south of Bukoba in what is now Tanzania.

In 1928 the Vicar Apostolic of South Nyanza, Joseph Sweens, was saying his breviary in the church at Rutabo when it collapsed in him. He dived under a prie-dieu, and was unhurt. Rutabo Diocese was founded in 1952 under Bishop Laurean Rugambwa, and had its preparatory seminary at Rutabo. On 31 March 1960 Pope John XXIII made Rugambwa the first Sub-Saharan African Cardinal of the Catholic Church. A 1960 sketch of the cardinal described his cathedral church of Rutaba as a makeshift structure with a roof of corrugated iron, but his diocese contained 61,000 members of his faith. In 1960 the Bunena preparatory seminary was transferred to Rutabo.
