= Kashozi =

- Mission
- Location within Tanzania
- Coordinates: 1.227971°S 31.808853°E
- Country: Tanzania
- Region: Kagera

Kashozi is the site of a Catholic mission established in German East Africa, now Tanzania. It is about 16 kilometres (9.9 mi) to the north of Bukoba.

The mission at Kashozi was founded by Mgr. Joseph Hirth in December 1892 when he was taking refuge from the civil war in Buganda. The parish was in Kiziba, one of the Haya states. At first it was called Marienberg. Kashozi was located near the new German town of Bukoba. When the Apostolic Vicariate of Southern Victoria Nyanza was formed in 1894, Kashozi became its Episcopal See. Joseph Sweens was appointed coadjutor bishop to Hirth on 17 December 1909 and returned to South Nyanza in April 1910. Hirth returned to his old residence at Kashozi, leaving Sweens to live at the seminary of Rubya. On 12 December 1912 Sweens succeeded Hirth as Vicar Apostolic of South Nyanza.

The White Sisters established themselves at Kashozi, and the parish became widely known for the help that it gave to women. In the period from 1928 to 1939, the parish averaged four resident European missionary priests, and after 1935 one African priest. During the same period the number of White Sisters rose from five to eight, while the number of African Sisters declined from sixteen in 1930 to nine in 1939.

Kashozi has a secondary school, although as of 1992 the ordinary peasants could not afford to pay the fees. Cardinal Laurean Rugambwa (July 12, 1912 – December 8, 1997), the first African bishop in Tanzania and first African cardinal, was buried at Kashogi. In October 2012 his body was exhumed and transferred to the renovated Mater Misericordiae Cathedral of Bukoba in a major ceremony attended by many religious and civil dignitaries.
