= Apostolic Vicariate of Victoria Nyanza =

The Apostolic Vicariate of Victoria Nyanza was a Catholic mission of the White Fathers (Society of the Missionaries of Africa) in the region around Lake Victoria from 1883 to 1894.

== History ==
The mission of Victoria Nyanza was founded in 1878 by the White Fathers of Charles Lavigerie. It was erected into an apostolic vicariate on 31 May 1883, with Mgr. Léon Livinhac as the first vicar Apostolic. When Livinhac became Superior General of the Society of White Fathers in October 1889, John Joseph Hirth was appointed his successor.

A civil war broke out in Buganda in 1892, during which the Catholic camp was totally defeated. The war pitted supporters of the French Catholic missions against supporters of the British missions in Buganda, backed by a small force of Sudanese soldiers under Captain Frederick Lugard of the Indian Army. Lugard's maxim gun proved decisive. Hirth and the White Fathers moved to the Bukoba kingdoms of Kiziba and Bugabo in 1892 with about fifty Baganda Christian converts. In December 1892 they founded a mission at Kashozi, in what is now the extreme north of Tanzania.

Victoria Nyanza was divided into three autonomous missions by a decree of 6 July 1894. The Apostolic Vicariate of Southern Nyanza was in German East Africa. Mgr. Hirth retained the government and became the first Apostolic Vicar. The Apostolic Vicariate of Upper Nile in British territory was given to the Mill Hill Missionaries, containing the provinces of Kyaggive and Kampala Mengo. The remaining provinces of Buganda were assigned to the Apostolic Vicariate of Northern Nyanza under the White Fathers, as well as the three Kingdoms of Unyoro, Toro and Ankole. Antonin Guillermain was made Apostolic Vicar of Northern Nyanza.
