= Apostolic Vicariate of Northern Victoria Nyanza =

Apostolic Vicariate of Northern (Victoria) Nyanza Vicariatus Apostolicus Victoriensis–Nyanzensis Septentrionalis

Location
- Country: Uganda

Information
- Rite: Latin Rite
- Established: 31 May 1883 - 15 January 1915

The Apostolic Vicariate of Northern (Victoria) Nyanza (Latin: Vicariatus Apostolicus Victoriensis–Nyanzensis Septentrionalis) was a Roman Catholic missionary jurisdiction in present Uganda.

== Origins ==
The mission of Victoria Nyanza was founded in 1878 by the White Fathers of Cardinal Lavigerie, was erected into the Apostolic Vicariate of Victoria Nyanza on 31 May 1883, with Mgr. Léon Livinhac as the first vicar Apostolic. When the latter was raised to the superior-generalship of the Society of White Fathers (October, 1889), the Holy See appointed Mgr. John Joseph Hirth as his successor. A Decree of 6 July 1894, divided Victoria Nyanza into three autonomous missions: the Vicariate Apostolic of Southern Nyanza in the German Protectorate, of which Mgr. Hirth retained the government and became the first titular; the Apostolic Vicariate of Upper Nile and Northern Nyanza, in English territory, the former given to the Fathers of Mill Hill and the second to the White Fathers.

== Location ==
From the 18 provinces of Uganda the Decree of 1894 detached that of Kyaggive and Kampala Mengo, which it placed under the jurisdiction of the Fathers of Mill Hill, and gave to Northern Nyanza the remaining 17 provinces of the Kingdom of Uganda, the three Kingdoms of Unyoro, Toro and Ankole, and in the Belgian Congo an isosceles triangle whose top was the northern point of Lake Albert Nyanza and whose base followed the 30th degree of longitude.

Three groups shared the portion of Northern Nyanza lying in the English protectorate; the first, that of the Baganda, in the early 20th century represented by 670,000 inhabitants, gave support to evangelization. the 1886 Ugandan Martyrs were Baganda. The second, the Banyoro, numbered 520,000 aborigines; the third, the Bahima (who are Hamites), the leading class in the shepherd Kingdom of Ankole, was a minority not exceeding 50,000 souls. The total population of Northern Nyanza equaled therefore about 1,500,000 inhabitants, of whom 1,400,000 were in English territory, and 360,000 in the Congo country.

== History ==
Antonin Guillermain was appointed the first Apostolic Vicar of Northern Nyanza. He died on 14 July 1896. His unexpected death was caused by a viral hemorrhagic fever. On 1 February 1897 Henri Streicher was appointed Titular Bishop of Thabraca and Vicar Apostolic of Northern Victoria Nyanza.

At the time of its creation (July, 1894) Northern Nyanza had an administrator, 17 missionaries divided among 5 stations, 15,000 neophytes and 21,000 catechumens. In July, 1896, the date of the death of Mgr. Guillerman, the first vicar Apostolic, the vicariate had 6 stations, 21 missionaries, and 20,000 baptized Christians. In July, 1911, it had 1 bishop, Mgr. Henri Streicher (preconized 2 February 1897), Bishop of Tabarca and second vicar Apostolic of Southern Nyanza, 118 missionaries divided among 28 stations, 113,810 neophytes and 97,630 catechumens. All the missionaries of Northern Nyanza, including the vicar Apostolic, were members of the Society of White Fathers. The native clergy consisted only of 2 subdeacons, 4 minor clerics and 4 tonsured clerics. They were assisted by 28 European religious of the Society of White Sisters, and by an institute of native religious called the Daughters of Mary. Eleven hundred and five Baganda and Banyoro teachers cooperated in educational work and in the service of 832 churches or chapels.

The headquarters of the mission was at Villa Maria, near Masaka, Uganda; there were situated the residence of the bishop, the two seminaries, a flourishing mission station, the central house of the White Sisters, the novitiate of the native sisters, and a printing establishments where there was published monthly in the Ganda language 16-page magazine entitled "Munno". Entebbe was the seat of the procurator of the vicariate.

== See also ==
- Catholic Church in Uganda
