= Buddu =

- County
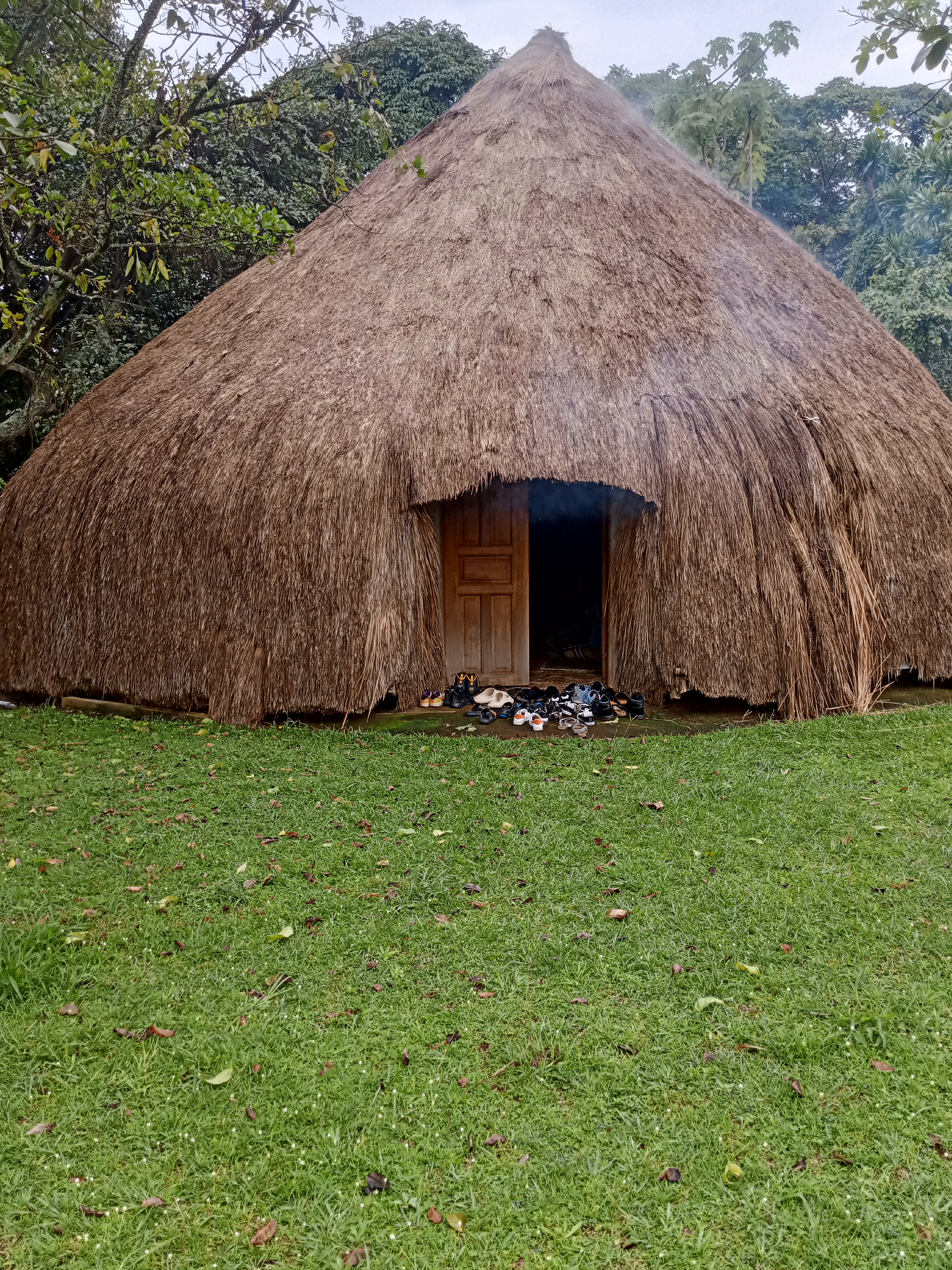
- Nagarabi Buddu coronation site

- Location within Uganda
- Coordinates: 0.41667°S 31.66667°E
- Country: Uganda
- Region: Central

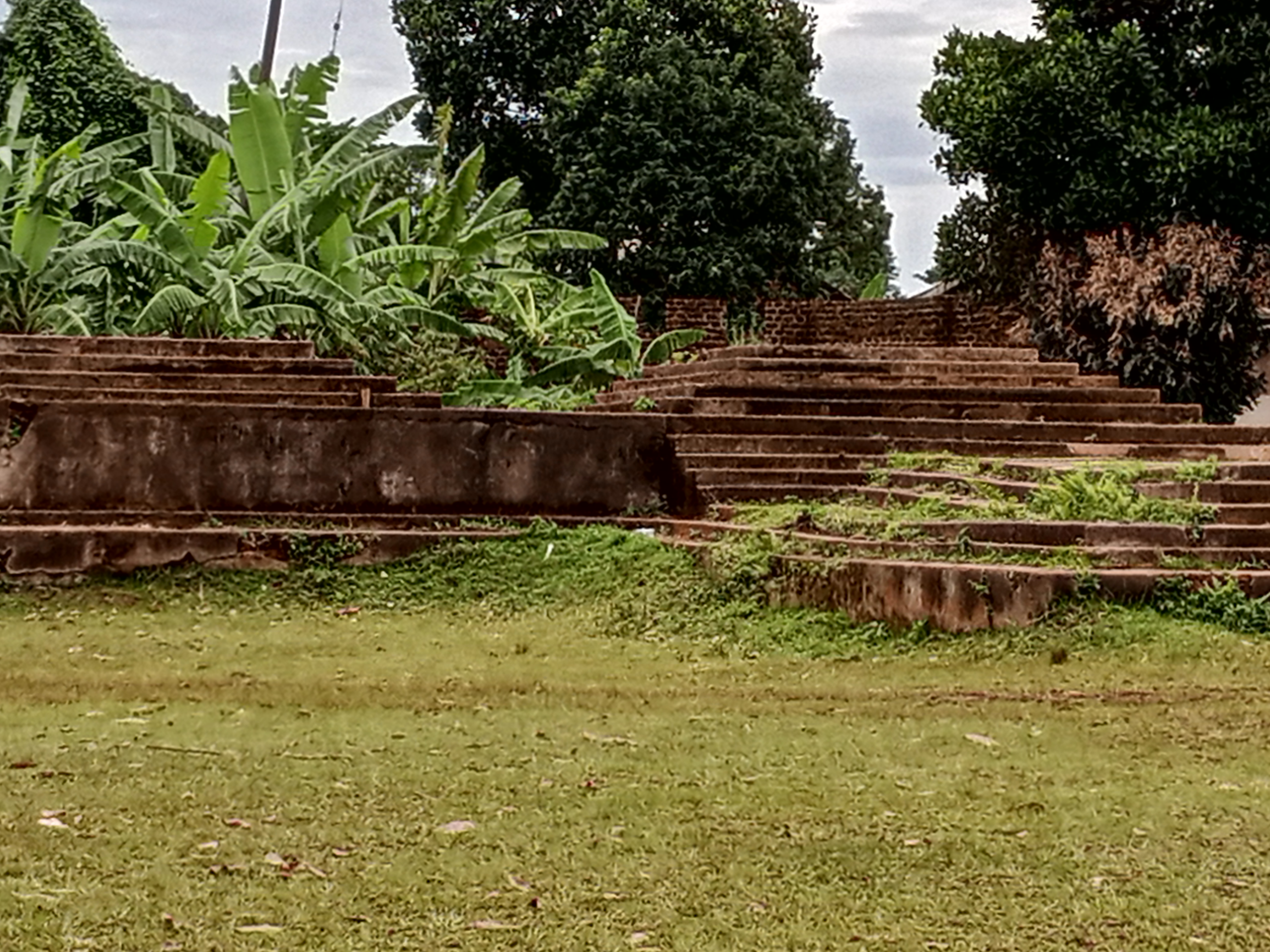
Buddu coronation site where Buganda Kings are crowned

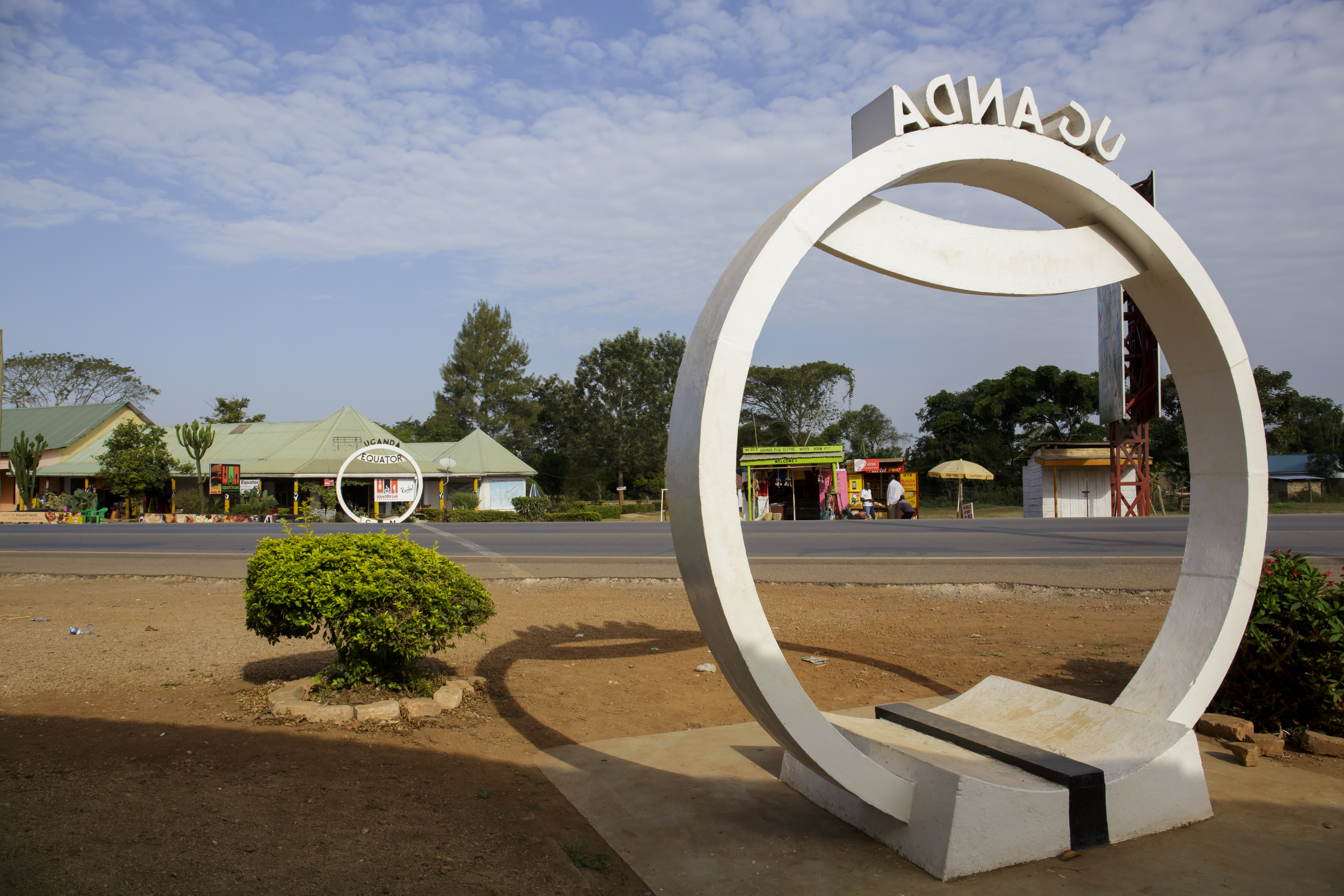
The Uganda Equator located in Kayabwe Masaka in Ssaza Buddu

Buddu is a county (Ssaza) of the kingdom of Buganda in what is now Uganda.

== Location ==
Buddu lies on the northwest shore of Lake Victoria in the Central Region of Uganda. Buddu is divided from the rest of the kingdom of Buganda by the wide and swampy Katonga River, but has similar soil and climate. It is fertile farming land, and was well-populated when conquered by Buganda in the late eighteenth century. In 2010, Buddu was split into four districts: Bukomansimbi District, Kalungu District, Lwengo District and Masaka District. Buddu presently includes districts of Bukomansimbi, Lwengo, Kalungu, Masaka and Kyotera(recently part of Rakai district)

== Province of Baganda ==
In the late eighteenth century the Kabaka Jjunju of Buganda (r. 1780 - 1797) defeated the Nyoro army and captured Buddu, which had been a province of Bunyoro. Buddu was the last territory to be acquired by Buganda before the arrival of the Europeans. In 1892 Buddu was the most prosperous province in the kingdom. That year there was a civil war in Uganda between supporters of the Catholic and Anglican churches. The supporters of the Catholics lost and had to move to Buddu.

Uganda was declared a protectorate in 1893. After this the British paid little attention to the Kabaka Mwanga II of Buganda. In July 1897 the British learned that there plans for a revolt, but Mwanga decided against the risk and fled from the capital to Buddu. A minor was crowned in his place, while Mwanga attracted a large number of supporters who were hostile to the colonial regime. In December 1897 there was a fight at Buddu, which turned into an outright revolt a year later. Mwanga finally surrendered in April 1899.

== Catholic missionary activity ==
Soon after the civil war ended in 1892 the White Fathers Catholic missionary Henri Streicher established the Villa Maria mission in Buddu. At the end of May 1892 Antonin Guillermain and two other White Fathers founded the mission of Notre-Dame de l'Equateur at Buddu, opposite the large island of Sissé in the north of Lake Victoria. Streicher was made Vicar Apostolic of Northern Victoria Nyanza in February 1897. He made his headquarters at Villa Maria. The chiefs who had converted to Catholicism moved to Buddu, and treated him as both civil and religious leader, equivalent to a king. Streicher assumed some of the royal trappings in his costume. The chiefs sent their sons to be his pages at his court, and they ensured that their followers were converted by the Ganda catechists.

In 1902 the Missionary Sisters of Our Lady of Africa, or White Sisters, began work in Buddu. By 1907 the mission had 140 resident girls, some wanting to become nuns. A novitiate was established in 1908 and the first three nuns were professed in 1910. By 1926 the community, with headquarters in Buddu, was led by the first Ugandan mother superior, Mama Cecilia Nalube (Mother Ursula.) Buddu became a center of Catholicism in Africa. The first African Catholic Bishop since the early days of Christianity, consecrated in 1939, came from Buddu.
