= WAMATA =

WAMATA is a Tanzanian non-governmental organization that works with people affected by HIV/AIDS. It runs Tanzania's oldest clinic for HIV. The acronym stands for the Swahili phrase "Walio Katika Mapambano Na AIDS Tanzania" which means "People in the fight against AIDS in Tanzania".

== History ==
WAMATA was founded in June 1989 by a small group of Tanzanian professionals and families to assist individuals living with HIV/AIDS diagnoses. Theresa Kaijage led the organization while head of social work and family therapy at Muhimbili Medical Centre and as a lecturer at the Social Welfare Training Institute. She fundraised and secured voluntary help, eventually managing to obtain a small office space in the Catholic Brothers of Christian Institution. It was there that she began offering counsel and support to victims of HIV/AIDS through WAMATA.

WAMATA was officially registered as a non-government organisation on 21 March 1990. In 1992 another branch was inaugurated in Rubya/Bukoba (western lakeside of Lake Victoria) for the Kagera Region. Another branch was inaugurated in Mwanza (southern lakeside of Lake Victoria) for the lake zone in the same year. The two branches are operating independently.

WAMATA collaborates with the National AIDS Control Program (NACP).
