= Apostolic Vicariate of Ruanda =

Apostolic Vicariate of Rwanda de Rwanda

Location
- Country: Rwanda
- Coordinates: 2.100°S 29.752°E

Statistics
- Area: 26,338 km^{2} (10,169 sq mi)

Information
- Denomination: Catholic
- Rite: Latin Rite
- Established: 25 April 1922 - 14 February 1952

The Apostolic Vicariate of Ruanda was created on 25 April 1922 from the northern part of the former Apostolic Vicariate of Kivu, serving the territory of what is now Rwanda. It was led by Bishop Léon-Paul Classe of the White Fathers. The Apostolic Vicariate of Urundi was created on the same date, serving the territory of what is now Burundi and led by Bishop Julien-Louis-Edouard-Marie Gorju.

Bishop Classe died on 31 January 1945 and was succeeded by Bishop Laurent-François Déprimoz. On 14 February 1952 the Apostolic Vicariate of Ruanda was divided into the Apostolic Vicariate of Kabgayi under Bishop Déprimoz and the Apostolic Vicariate of Nyundo under Bishop Aloys Bigirumwami.
