= Benebikira Sisters =

Roman Catholic religious congregation

The Benebikira Sisters are a Roman Catholic religious institute of women founded in Rwanda in the early 1900s. Their Charisma is to evangelize by example. They do this by their diverse works of service, carried out with joy and love. Their mission is education, particularly for girls, care of the sick and the poor, especially women and children. Their spirituality is based on the Jesuit model of contemplation in action, seeing God in all things. However the expression of their Catholic faith and consecrated spirituality is formed by their Rwandan culture. The Benebikira are one with their people, sharing their Christian faith that calls them to be a people of hope and a voice for justice and love. Numbering almost 400 sisters, they have 55 communities located primarily in Rwanda but also in Burundi, Uganda, Congo, Kenya, and Rome. Their Kinyarwanda name means “Daughters of Mary” in English.

== History ==
Msgr. Jean Joseph Hirth of the Society of the Missionaries of Africa began the establishment of the Benebikira sisters in 1913 with the acceptance of a small group of young women as aspirants. Msgr. Hirth envisioned that the Benebikira would be a native Rwandan congregation whose life of consecration and works of service would be expressed through their own Rwandan culture. At the beginning, however, he put their formation under the direction of the Missionaries of our Lady of Africa who would be responsible for the Benebikira order for the next forty years. In 1916, a novitiate was set up and in 1919 the first Benebikira sister pronounced her religious vows and the group was recognized by the Holy See as a Devout Union. In 1935 they were approved as a Diocesan right congregation. In 1953 the Rwandan Benebikira sisters elected their first Mother General and Council and thus assumed full responsibility for the governance of their order. In 2008, they received the status of Pontifical Right from the Holy See. Expansion to other countries began with the Congo in 1961, Burundi, 1973, Uganda, 1982, Kenya 1995, and Italy, 2008.

=== First Rwandan Mother General (1953-1964) ===
Under the leadership of the first Rwandan mother general, Sister Theresa Kamugisha, Msgr. Hirth’s vision of establishing a truly Rwandan order of sisters was realized. She exhorted them to be strong Rwandan women—responsible, able to manage, and independent. Sr. Therese proposed that Mary, the Mother of Sorrows, be their model and built a small African style chapel dedicated to her at the Mother House in Save, a small rural village where the first Catholic Church in Rwanda was built. It is here where her body has been laid to rest.

Sr. Theresa, who had very little schooling herself, valued the importance of education and traveled to Europe to secure secondary and university scholarships from European religious congregations for her sisters. She presided over the congregation for twelve years during the time of political un-rest which surrounded Rwanda’s independence. While Rwanda became increasingly separated by ethnic politics; the Benebikira continued to live as a united community without ethnic discrimination among its members.

=== Kibeho as a Historic and Touristic Site ===
Beginning in 1980, the Benebikira Secondary School for Girls in Kibeho was the site of a series of Marian apparitions to three of its students. The message was a call for a change of heart. Kibeho has become a well known shrine in Africa, attracting many pilgrims who come not for physical cures but a change of heart. The sisters continue to administer the school and have built a small hospitality house to welcome pilgrims.

=== 1994 Genocide ===
During the 1994 Rwandan Genocide of the Tutsi, 18 sisters were killed and ten convents destroyed. Other sisters died as a consequence of the genocide. In the immediate aftermath of the genocide, over 500 orphans were living in their community houses. In concert with the new government policy they worked to find families for them and the hundreds of others who found their way to temporary orphanages created at Nyanza, Ruhengeri and Rulindo. For the 350 where this was not possible, they created a highly successful network of family homes where the children became family to one another with the oldest serving as head. A secondary school, Immaculate Conception, was opened in Save to offer education for the orphans under the care and guardianship of the Congregation. In recognition of their stance against the genocide ideology, the Rwandan government bestowed Hero awards on two sisters YANKURIJE M Pierre Claver and Sister RAMUTSA Marie Jean de la Croix. The American-based Peace Abbey awarded the Benebikira their Courage of Conscience Award in 2010.

== Financial Sustainability ==
As a native African order, the Benebikira Sisters could not depend on European or American benefactors to support their works. One of the hallmarks of the Benebikira Sisters is the importance they place on creating socially responsible businesses that are aligned with their mission. Examples of this include traditional farming enterprises, guest houses, and housing for young women who are studying or working away from their families. The sisters are directly involved in the project management of many of their construction activities. Not only do these projects help support their works, they provide jobs and training to youth, as well as contributing to the economic growth of their developing country.

In 1951 by Royal Decree the Congregation was assigned the status of a legal entity in Rwanda which allowed them to work in the whole of the country. They were the first women allowed to own property in their own right. The Benebikira continue to have an independent legal status under the present government which recognizes them as Denominational Association “Benebikira.” This legal status allows them to own property, administer works of social good and also conduct for-profit businesses with the provision that the profits are used for the social good.

== Governance ==
The congregation is governed by a Mother General, assisted by four council members, elected for six-year terms by a delegation of sisters who have been nominated by all voting members of the congregation. Before the election, this delegation reviews the previous six years and approves a strategic plan for the next six years. The Congregation is divided into three provinces, each with a Provincial appointed by the Mother General.

Admission into the congregation is a five-year process to introduce prospective members to community living, theological education, the community’s spirituality and practical experience. A final commitment is made after two more years and sisters are fully fledged voting members eight years after their first vows. Applicants are expected to have a high school education; further professional and university education is provided as appropriate, Sisters live in small groups of at least four, and donate their salaries to the congregation.

The Generalate is located in Butare, PO Box 101, Butare, Rwanda. The Mother House is in nearby Save. The Generalate is the administrative headquarters while the Mother House serves as the location for all annual retreats, conferences, and the novitiate. It is in a spacious compound with an extensive farming and dairy operation which provides food for the schools and sisters as well as employment for the poor in the village.

== Diversity of Service ==
=== Schools ===
The Benebikira Sisters administer a network of 14 secondary boarding schools, twelve of them in Rwanda. Their schools consistently rank in the top 15% and they are recognized for their emphasis on promoting the traditional Rwandan understanding of what it means to be a well-educated person. The Benebikira maintain an administrative team of at least three sisters in each of their schools: a principal, a business manager and a sister who oversees the life and education of the students outside of their classroom time. This team is responsible for carrying out the Benebikira model of education which is based on creating a learning community that embraces cooperation, teamwork, responsibility, and leadership development. Teachers and other staff are usually lay people. Schools follow the national curriculum. Three are private, eleven are government aided; eight schools are all girls.

Secondary Boarding Schools

- Byimana Gr. Scolaire Notre Dame de Lourdes
- Kayonza FAWE School for Girls
- Kibeho Gr. Scolaire Mère du Verbe
- Muramba Gr. Scolaire Immaculée Conception
- Nyamata Maranyundo Girls School
- Nyanza Gr. Scolaire Mater Dei (Coed)
- Rulindo Gr. Scolaire de la Visitation
- Rwamagana Collège Notre Dame de la Paix
- Save Collège Immaculée Conception (Coed)
- Save Gr. Scolaire Ste Bernadette (Coed)
- Zaza Gr. Scolaire St. Kizio
- Congo, Goma le Lycée Annuarité
- Burundi, Ecole de Gestion de Mukoni
- Burundi Lycee de Rugari

Primary Schools

- Kanyanza
- Kigali, Our Lady of Angels
- Nyamasheke
- Nyanza, St Joseph’s
- Burundi, Muramvya
- Burundi, Rugari
- Vocational Schools
- Ngarama
- Kabgayi

=== Health Care ===
The Benebikira administer six district health centers – Mbuga, Cyanika, Kabuga, Save, and Muyunzwe in Rwanda and Gitaramuka in Burundi. All but Kabuga, which is privately owned by the Sisters, are government owned and funded. Sisters also hold staff positions in hospitals in Rwanda, Congo, Burundi and Uganda

=== Hospitality ===
Hostels

In 2008 the Benebikira opened a 350-room dormitory in Butare for women students at the National University of Rwanda, to provide safe, affordable housing so that more women could attend the University. In Kigali there is an 80-room hostel for young single women who have come from the rural areas to work or study.

Hospitality Houses

There are two houses in Huye: Mary of the Word and Our Lady of the Road. They are frequently used for conferences and retreats. The Hospitality House at Kibeho, Queen of Peace, provides accommodations for pilgrims to the Mother of the Word Shrine. In Burundi there is Safari Lodge. Each house has a chapel, conference space, and a restaurant.
