= Jambo Bukoba =

Jambo Bukoba e.V.
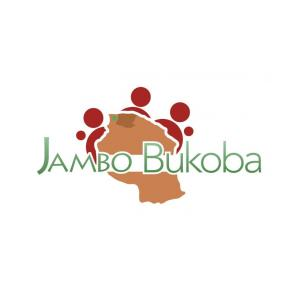
- Founded: 2008
- Founder: Clemens Mulokozi
- Dissolved: 2013
- Type: Registered Association
- Location(s): Munich and Bukoba
- Members: 417
- Employees: 11
- Volunteers: 80
- Website: jambobukoba.com

Jambo Bukoba (Swahili, in English: Hello Bukoba) was between 2008 and 2013 a charity in Germany. Since 2008 it uses sport and games to improve education, health and equal opportunity for children and adolescents in Tanzania.

== Activities ==
Jambo Bukoba promoted education, health (through age-appropriate HIV/AIDS and hygiene education) and gender equality between the sexes. The organization's concept was developed by the German Sport University Cologne and combines sport and games in the school curriculum with experiential education. The concept also fostered the involvement of teachers, parents and public life and improves the educational know-how of the teachers and school infrastructures. The aim was to support and empower children and young adolescents in their day-to-day school environment so that they have a better start in life and brighter prospects for the shaping and improvement of their own futures.

== Approach ==
From the office in Bukoba, the Tanzanian subsidiary carried out projects throughout the Kagera region in the north-west of the country. These projects are built on three pillars: teacher development, sports competitions and school building projects.

- Jambo Bukoba e.V. staff organizes teacher workshops in Tanzania. Attendees are trained in the Jambo Bukoba concept and the games specially developed by the German Sport University Cologne. Medical professionals are brought in to provide HIV/AIDS education. Furthermore, teachers are developed as multipliers
- Open sports competitions featuring Jambo Bukoba games are run. Known as Bonanzas, the focus of these competitions is not on sporting performance but on gender parity, fair play and good team work. Four schools vie with each other in each district. A regional bonanza final is held once a year during which winning district schools compete. This is a major event for all participants with a fun and festive spirit of music and dance.
- The school that triumphs in the regional Bonanza wins the opportunity to realize a school building project. The school decides on its most urgent construction requirements. Jambo Bukoba then contributes 75% to the overall project costs and the school provides the remaining 25% in the form of cash, work time or materials
- Within the scope of the project "WASH" (Water, Sanitation and Hygiene) water tanks for catching rainwater and hand-washing facilities including soap were built at 8 schools. Furthermore, sanitation workshops for teachers were conducted to improve the knowledge about hygiene in general. In 2018, 8 water filters were installed, to ensure drinking water quality.

== Background to the situation in Tanzania ==
44.8 per cent of the 56 million inhabitants of Tanzania are under the age of 15. General problems: School attendance is not the norm. Many children only attend school sporadically or they leave school prematurely. Girls in particular are at a disadvantage: they often have to work, help out at home or stay away from school during menstruation due to its association with shame. They also have to deal with teenage pregnancy, the dangers of HIV/AIDs and, in particular, discrimination. 70% of those newly infected with HIV/AIDs are between the ages of 15 and 24 years old - 75% of whom are girls. 29% of the population above the age of 15 years cannot read and write.

Clemens Mulokozi, the founder of Jambo Bukoba, lived in Tanzania between the ages of five and twelve. Those years were the personal impetus for him to improve the conditions for girls and boys in Tanzania.

== Results ==
- 516,413 school-age children have been made aware of and helped by the Jambo Bukoba concept
- 884 schools and 1,730 teachers have taken part in workshops and school building projects
- 57 school building projects have been realized (e.g. toilets, classrooms, etc.)
- 55 sports competitions (Bonanzas) have been held with more than 9,000 schoolchildren participating on district- regional level
- Frequent media dissemination of Jambo Bukoba messages via internet, television, radio and newspapers
- 3 Masters/Bachelors theses
- Text book publication of "Life Skills through Games, A Teacher's Guide" by Sebastian Rockenfeller

In August 2014, the social entrepreneurship organization Ashoka carried out a teachers’ survey on the effects of the Jambo Bukoba in two participating schools in the Kagera region. Teachers confirmed that:

- Attendance levels were increased
- Primary school graduation rates were better
- Girls received higher grade averages
- Girls had more opportunities to participate in school sporting activities
- Educational knowledge was enhanced by the workshops
- Teacher and student HIV and AIDS education was improved

== Organization ==
The German parent organization finances activities via membership fees and fundraising-activities. It also undertakes public relations, strategic planning, budgetary control and operational management with the cooperation of the project teams in Tanzania. Volunteers, full-time employees and Clemens Mulokozi carry out the daily work of Jambo Bukoba in Germany and Tanzania. In Germany, office administration costs are covered by corporate supporters and foundations in the form of material donations and services. Hence, 100% of private donations can be deployed on the ground in Tanzania. Jambo Bukoba e.V. is committed to the transparency standards laid down by the organization Initiative Transparente Zivilgesellschaft (Action for a Transparent Civil Society). Jambo Bukoba e.V. is a member of the Deutschen Spendenrat (German Donations Council) and VENRO (Association of German Development and Humanitarian Aid NGOs).

== Supporters. ==
Following is a selection of the companies that support Jambo Bukoba e.V.

- Allianz SE
- Ashoka
- Foreign Office of Germany
- Embassy of Tanzania in Germany
- Deutsche Post DHL AG
- Deutsche Sporthochschule Köln
- FC Bayern München
- Ministry of the Region of Kagera
- Pro7 Sat 1 (German TV-Channel)
- UniCredit Bank AG (formerly: HypoVereinsbank)
- UNOSDP

== Goals ==
- Development of the Jambo Bukoba concept in other Tanzanian regions with the aim of covering the entire country
- Expansion of the current concept for older adolescents as a campus in the Kagera region

== Awards ==
In 2015, the Chancellor of the Federal Republic of Germany Angela Merkel recognized Jambo Bukoba with a Startsocial national award. Clemens Mulokozi, the founder of Jambo Bukoba, was named an Ashoka Fellow in 2016.
