= Save, Rwanda =

Save
- Town and sector
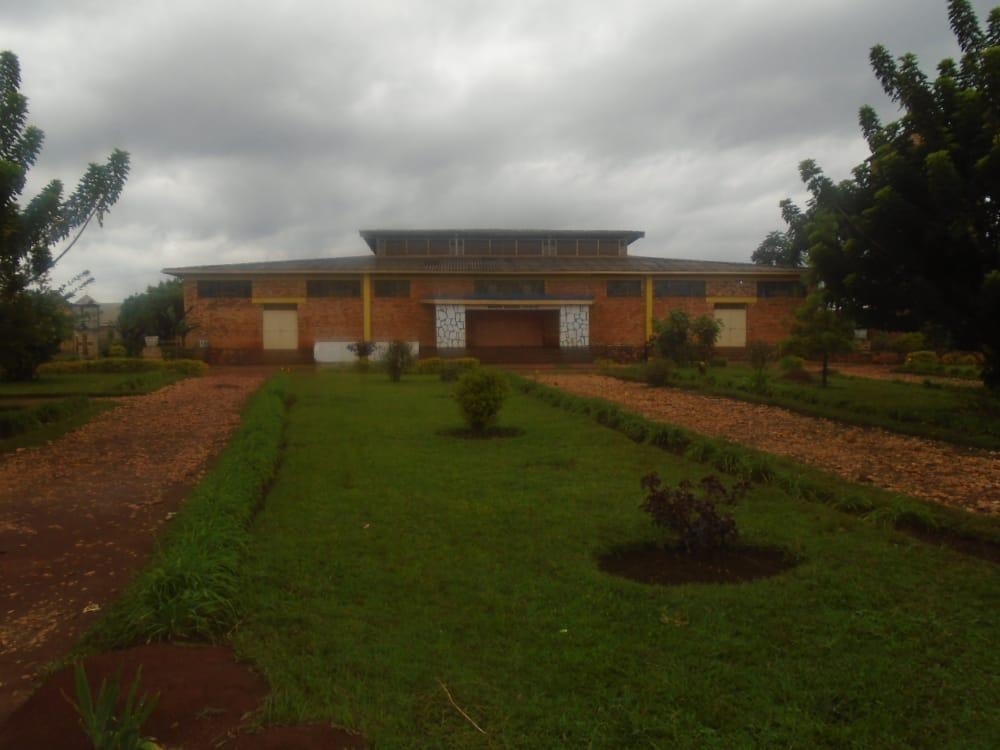
- The Catholic Church in Save

- Location in Rwanda
- Coordinates: 2.546059°S 29.772134°E
- Country: Rwanda
- Province: Southern Province
- District: Gisagara

Area
  - Town and sector: 41.08 km^{2} (15.86 sq mi)

Population (2022 census)
  - Town and sector: 30,941
  - Density: 753.2/km^{2} (1,951/sq mi)
  - Urban: 5,190

Save is a town and sector in Rwanda. It is located a few miles north of the town of Butare, and in the west of the Gisagara District of Southern Province. There is a church, several schools and a health centre. It is also home to the Mother House of the Benebikira Sisters.

German forces occupied Rwanda in 1897. In 1899 Bishop John Joseph Hirth travelled to that country. There he tried to develop a relationship with King Yuhi Musinga. Hirth gained permission to found the first Catholic missions in Rwanda at Save, Zaza and Nyundo between 1900 and 1901. The first church in Rwanda was built at Save in 1900, a thatched structure. Later it was replaced by a brick building.

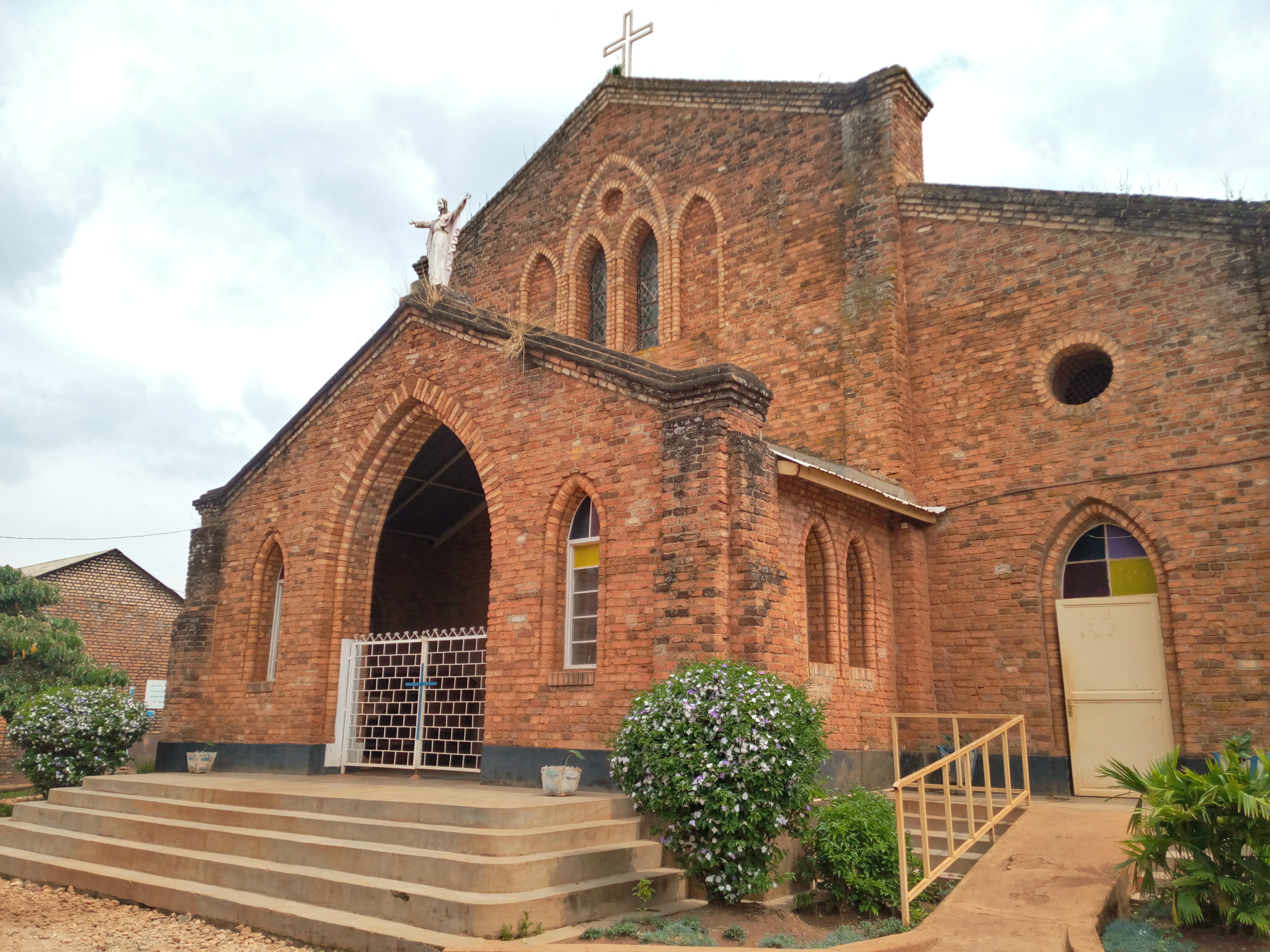
Save church old building. In front of it is the newly built church, bigger in size and more modern.
