= Spechbach, Haut-Rhin =

Commune in Grand Est, France

Spechbach
- Commune
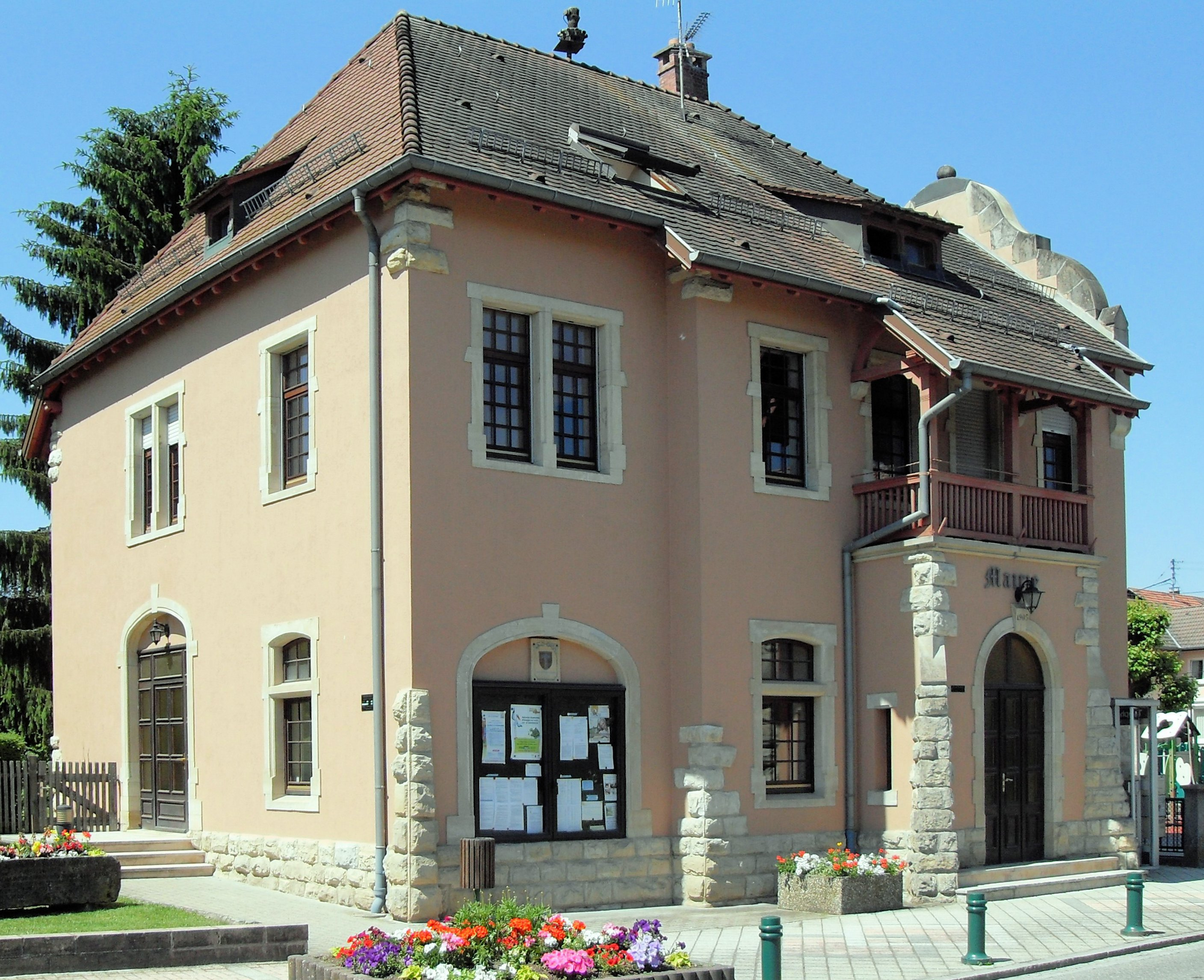
- The town hall in Spechbach

- Coat of arms
- Location of Spechbach
- Location within France Location within Grand Est
- Coordinates: 47°40′52″N 7°12′58″E
- Country: France
- Region: Grand Est
- Department: Haut-Rhin
- Arrondissement: Altkirch
- Canton: Altkirch

Government
  - Mayor (2020–2026): Paul Stoffel
- Area^{1}: 8.06 km^{2} (3.11 sq mi)
- Population (2023): 1,418
  - Density: 176/km^{2} (456/sq mi)
- Time zone: UTC+01:00 (CET)
  - Summer (DST): UTC+02:00 (CEST)
- INSEE/Postal code: 68320 /68720
- ^{1} French Land Register data, which excludes lakes, ponds, glaciers > 1 km^{2} (0.386 sq mi or 247 acres) and river estuaries.

Spechbach is a commune in the Haut-Rhin department of northeastern France. The municipality was established on 1 January 2016 and consists of the former communes of Spechbach-le-Haut and Spechbach-le-Bas.

== See also ==
- Communes of the Haut-Rhin department
