= Spechbach-le-Haut =

Part of Spechbach in Grand Est, France

- Part of Spechbach
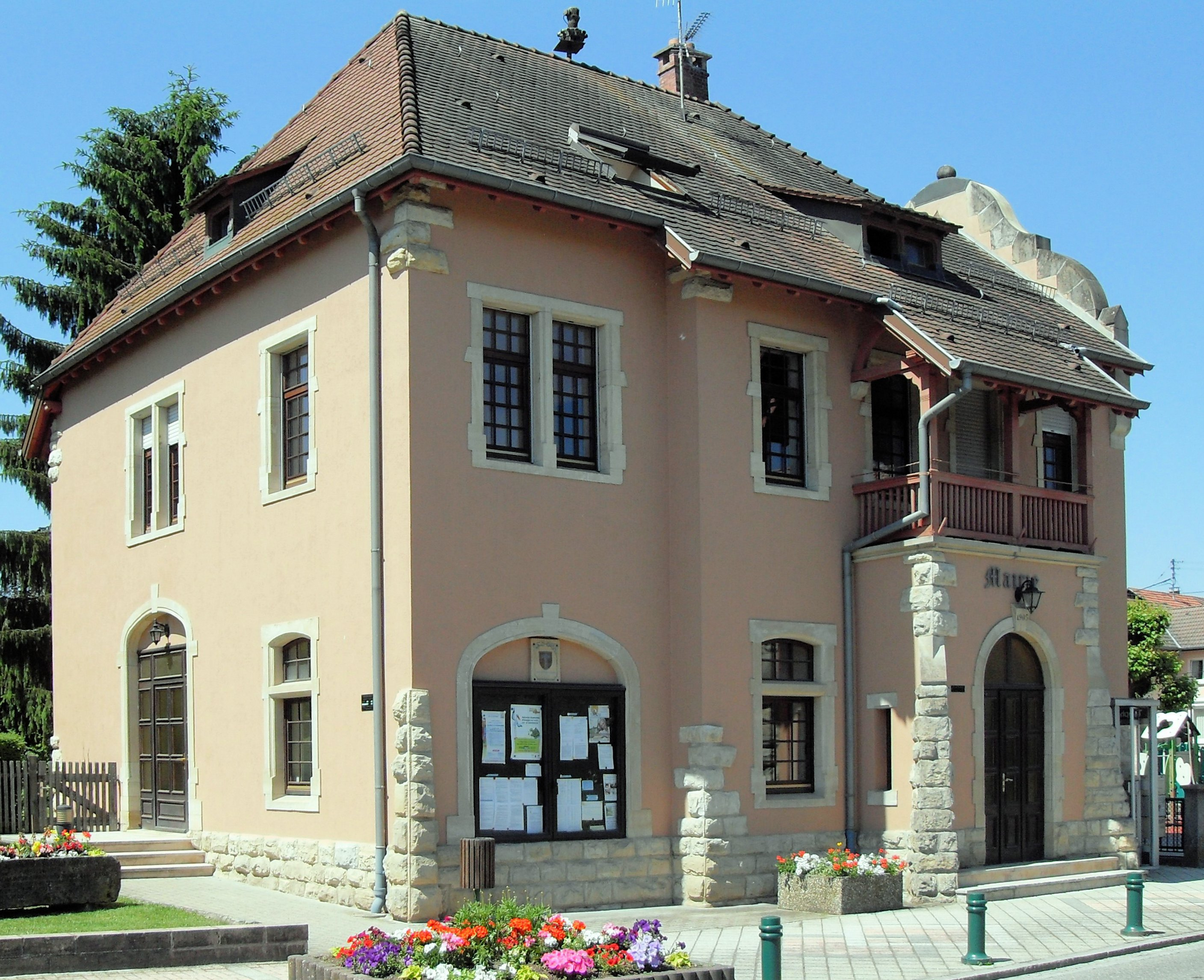
- Town hall

- Coat of arms
- Location of Spechbach-le-Haut
- Location within France Location within Grand Est
- Coordinates: 47°40′52″N 7°13′03″E
- Country: France
- Region: Grand Est
- Department: Haut-Rhin
- Arrondissement: Altkirch
- Canton: Altkirch
- Commune: Spechbach
- Area^{1}: 3.92 km^{2} (1.51 sq mi)
- Elevation: 277 m (909 ft)
- Highest elevation: 297 m (974 ft)
- Lowest elevation: 267 m (876 ft)
- Population (2019): 663
  - Density: 169/km^{2} (438/sq mi)
- Time zone: UTC+01:00 (CET)
  - Summer (DST): UTC+02:00 (CEST)
- Postal code: 68720
- ^{1} French Land Register data, which excludes lakes, ponds, glaciers > 1 km^{2} (0.386 sq mi or 247 acres) and river estuaries.

Spechbach-le-Haut (German: Oberspechbach, Alsatian: Owerspachbi) is a former commune in the Haut-Rhin department in north-eastern France. On 1 January 2016, it was merged into the new commune Spechbach.

== See also ==
- Communes of the Haut-Rhin department
