= SHARE in Africa =

SHARE in Africa is a 501(c)(3) nonprofit organization that supports girls' education in Africa. It was founded in 2008 by Shannon McNamara with the mission to address the 'book famine' in Africa by providing girls with learning materials.

Since its inception, SHARE has given educational opportunities to thousands of girls in Tanzania. Specifically, 40,000 students and teachers in 9 schools in Africa have been supplied with tons of learning materials including 33,000 books, laptop computers, and E-readers. SHARE has built libraries, a community center, computer rooms, and has installed electricity and solar power into the Tanzanian schools.

SHARE is now focusing its efforts on sponsoring girls to attend secondary school.

Shannon McNamara spoke about SHARE's work educating girls at the White House in 2011 as part of the 100th anniversary celebration of International Women's Day. She also wrote a blog for the White House

SHARE is headquartered in St. Petersburg, Florida in the United States.
