= John Joseph Hirth =

Catholic Bishop and religious leader from France (1854-1931

The Most Reverend John Joseph Hirth
- Vicar Apostolic of Kivu (1912–1921)
- Native name: Jean-Joseph Hirth
- Installed: 12 December 1912
- Term ended: 25 October 1920
- Successor: Julien-Louis-Edouard-Marie Gorju
- Other posts: Vicar Apostolic of Southern Victoria Nyanza (13 July 1894 – 12 December 1912); Titular bishop of Teveste (4 December 1889 – 6 January 1931); Vicar Apostolic of Victoria Nyanza (4 December 1889 – 13 July 1894)

Orders
- Ordination: 15 September 1878 by Charles Lavigerie
- Consecration: 5 May 1890 by Léon Livinhac

Personal details
- Born: 26 March 1854 Spechbach-le-Bas, Alsace, France
- Died: 6 January 1931 (aged 76) Kabgayi, Rwanda
- Denomination: Catholic
- Occupation: Priest

John Joseph Hirth (French: Jean-Joseph Hirth; 26 March 1854 – 6 January 1931) was a Catholic bishop in German East Africa, known as the founder of the church in Rwanda.

== Early years ==
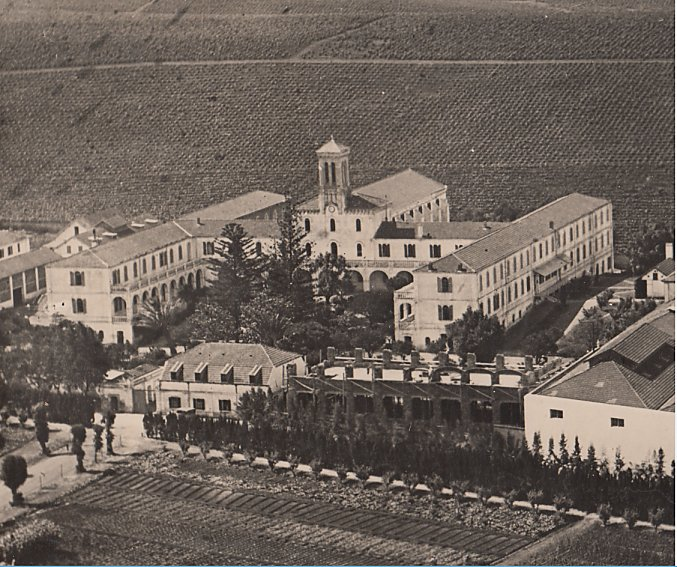
Maison-Carrée, novitiate of the White Fathers.

John Joseph Hirth was born on 26 March 1854 at Spechbach-le-Bas (Niederspechbach), near Altkirch in Alsace. His parents were Jean Hirth, a teacher, and Catherine Sauner. Hirth was fluent in both French and German. After primary school he entered the secondary school at Altkirch, studied at the minor seminaries of Lachapelle-sous-Rougemont and Zillisheim, and then attended the college at Luxeuil-les-Bains. After the German acquisition of Alsace he chose French citizenship in 1872, since he was refused dual citizenship. He studied theology at the Major Seminary in Nancy from 1873 to 1875, and was then admitted to the White Fathers (Society of the Missionaries of Africa) as a novice. He studied under Léon Livinhac.

Hirth completed his religious and sacerdotal education at Maison Carrée, near Algiers, took his oath as a member of the society on 12 October 1876 and was ordained a priest on 15 September 1878. In 1882 he was made the first Director of the minor seminary of Saint Anne in Jerusalem. In 1886, he was made Director of the minor seminary of St. Eugene in Algiers.

== Victoria Nyanza ==
In 1887 Hirth was assigned to Uganda, arriving at Bukumbi on the south shore of Lake Victoria in October 1887. He was given the task of running a school of catechists and a minor seminary. Hirth lived at the Kamoga mission (Note: The Kamoga mission had been founded at the village of Laguneda in April 1883, and was named after a local chief.) for three years while directing an orphanage of children of former slaves whom the White Fathers had freed and converted to Christianity. At the start of 1890 his superior as Vicar Apostolic, Léon Livinhac, heard he had been appointed Superior General of the White Fathers, and on 25 May 1890 he consecrated Hirth as his successor.

Hirth was appointed Titular Bishop of Teveste and Vicar Apostolic of Victoria Nyanza (now the Diocese of Mwanza) on 4 December 1889. He was consecrated bishop on 25 May 1890. This area included parts of modern-day Uganda, Rwanda, Burundi and northern Tanzania. Hirth set the objective of making Buddu a Catholic country by the end of 1892, unleashing a surge of building and evangelical activity. For several years he traveled through his huge vicariate visiting the scattered missions. The missionaries had to deal with rivalries between the local rulers, who were forming alliances with the rival colonial powers of Germany and Britain, and at times with hostility from the colonial authorities.

A civil war broke out in Buganda in 1892, during which the Catholic camp was totally defeated. The war pitted supporters of the French Catholic missions against supporters of the British missions in Buganda, backed by a small force of Sudanese soldiers under Captain Frederick Lugard of the Indian Army. Lugard's maxim gun proved decisive. Hirth and the White Fathers moved to the Bukoba kingdoms of Kiziba and Bugabo in 1892 with about fifty Baganda Christian converts. In December 1892 they founded a mission at Kashozi, in what is now the extreme north of Tanzania.

In 1894 the diocese was split into Southern Nyanza, south and west of Lake Victoria, an eastern portion called "Upper Nile" that was given to the English Mill Hill Missionaries, and a northern portion called "Northern Nyanza" that covered the south and west of today's Uganda. Hirth was appointed vicar Apostolic of Southern Victoria Nyanza on 13 July 1894. He made Kashozi his Episcopal See. Hirth moved to Rubya, where he had founded a seminary, and was personally involved in training future priests for Bukoba and Rwanda. By 1906 he had five mission posts in the Bukoba region and three in the Mwanza region. Joseph Sweens was appointed coadjutor bishop to Hirth and reached South Nyanza in April 1910. Hirth returned to his old residence at Kashozi, leaving Sweens to live at the seminary of Rubya. The Catholic Encyclopedia of 1912 said the vicariate had about 2,500,000 pagans, 7,000 Catholics, 12,000 catechumens, 30 White Fathers; 23 lay brothers and six Missionary Sisters of Notre-Dame-d'Afrique. There were 15 mission stations and 20 churches or chapels.

== Kivu ==
German forces occupied Rwanda in 1897. In 1899 Hirth traveled to that country. There he tried to develop a relationship with King Yuhi Musinga. Hirth gained permission to found the first Catholic missions in Rwanda at Save, Zaza and Nyundo between 1900 and 1901. The church felt that if the king and the Tutsi ruling class of Rwanda were converted, the rest of the population would automatically accept the Catholic faith, so they focused their effort on the Tutsis. The use of the Hutu peasantry to provide low-paid or unpaid labor in building the mission stations, and identification of the White Fathers with the Tutsis, caused the Hutus to distrust the missionaries. At the same time, the growing power of the missions cause resentment among the Tutsi notables, so progress was slow at first.

However, Hirth's greatest success was in Rwanda, where he had six mission posts by 1906 and ten in 1912, with 8,500 baptized Christians. In 1912 the missions in Burundi, which had been under the Apostolic Vicariate of Unyanyembe, were joined with those of Rwanda to form the Apostolic Vicariate of Kivu (now Bukavu). In 1908 he had a book of prayers published in Rwanda, followed by a catechism and extracts from the Bible in 1911. On 12 December 1912, Jean-Joseph Hirth was appointed the first Vicar Apostolic of Kivu. He was succeeded at Southern Victoria Nyanza by Joseph Sweens. Hirth established himself at Kabgayi and worked with the Rwandan seminarists there until his retirement in 1921. By then there were thirty thousand Christians in the Vicariate.

Hirth retired as Vicar Apostolic on 25 October 1920. He continued to teach at the seminary in Kabgayi. One of his students in 1921 was the young Aloys Bigirumwami, later the first African bishop to be ordained in Belgian Africa. Hirth died at Kabgayi on 6 January 1931, aged 76.

== Sources ==
- Adekunle, Julius (2007). Culture and Customs of Rwanda. Greenwood Publishing Group. ISBN 978-0-313-33177-0.
- Blatz, Jean-Paul (1987). "HIRTH Jean Joseph". In Vogler, Bernard (ed.). L'Alsace. Dictionnaire du monde religieux dans la France contemporaine (in French). Paris: Éditions Beauchesne. p. 205. ISBN 978-2-7010-1141-7.
- "Bukoba Catholic Diocese in Brief". Bukoba Catholic Diocese. Archived from the original on 2013-04-03.
- Faupel, John F. (2007). African Holocaust: The Story of the Uganda Martyrs. Paulines Publications Africa. p. 57. ISBN 978-9966-21-629-8.
- Gahungu, Méthode (2007). Former les prêtres en Afrique: Le rôle des Pères Blancs (1879–1936). l'Harmattan. p. 186. ISBN 978-2-296-04471-5.
- Herbermann, Charles George; Pace, Edward Aloysius; Pallen, Condé Bénoist; Thomas Joseph Shahan; John Joseph Wynne; Andrew Alphonsus MacErlean (1912). The Catholic Encyclopedia: An International Work of Reference on the Constitution, Doctrine, Discipline, and History of the Catholic Church. Robert Appleton Company. Archived from the original on 26 January 2013.
- Jeal, Tim (2011). Explorers of the Nile. Yale University Press. p. 419. ISBN 978-0-300-17827-2.
- Maillard Lustig, Xavier (2012), « Bishop J.J. Hirth » in 'Eastern Africa'
- "Metropolitan Archdiocese of Bukavu". GCatholic.org. Archived from the original on 2013-03-27.
- Minnaert, Stefaan (1 April 2008). "Premier voyage de Mgr. Hirth au Rwanda...". Histoire et Missions Chrétiennes N-005. Acculturation, syncrétisme, métissage, créolisation (Amérique, Océanie. XVIe-XIXe s.). KARTHALA Editions. ISBN 978-2-8111-4265-0.
- Ntamabyaliro, Apollinaire (January 2011). Rwanda pour une réconciliation, la miséricorde chrétienne: Une analyse historico-théologique du magistère épiscopal rwandais (1952–1962). Harmattan. ISBN 978-2-296-44873-5.
- "Prelates of Mwanza". The Archdiocese of Mwanza. Archived from the original on 2011-11-27.
- Shorter, Aylward (2003). "Bishop Streicher, Henri 1863 to 1952". Dictionary of African Christian. Archived from the original on 2011-11-18.
- Shorter, Aylward (2011-12-01). Les Pères Blancs au temps de la conquête coloniale: Histoire des Missionnaires d'Afrique (1892–1914). KARTHALA Editions. ISBN 978-2-8111-0575-4.
- Sundkler, Bengt G. M.; Steed, Christopher (2000). A History of the Church in Africa. Cambridge University Press. p. 597. ISBN 978-0-521-58342-8.
