= Apostolic Vicariate of Kivu =

Former Latin Catholic jurisdiction in Africa

The Apostolic Vicariate of Kivu can refer to either of two vicariates of the White Fathers, a Catholic missionary society in the Latin Church of the Catholic Church. Both vicariates served lands around Lake Kivu during the early to mid 20th century. The first vicariate, from 1912 to 1922, served what are now Rwanda and Burundi. The second vicariate, from 1929 to 1952, served territory in the east of the Belgian Congo.

== Rwanda and Burundi ==
The missions in Burundi had been under the Apostolic Vicariate of Unyanyembe, while those of Rwanda were under the Apostolic Vicariate of Southern Victoria Nyanza. In 1912 these missions were joined to form the new Apostolic Vicariate of Kivu. On 12 December 1912, John Joseph Hirth was appointed the first Vicar Apostolic of Kivu. Hirth established his headquarters at Kabgayi, and worked there until his retirement in 1921. By then there were thirty thousand Christians in the Vicariate. The name was changed to the Apostolic Vicariate of Urundi and Kivu in 1921.

On 25 April 1922 the Apostolic Vicariate of Ruanda was created from the former Apostolic Vicariate of Kivu, led by Bishop Léon-Paul Classe. On 14 February 1952 this was divided into the Apostolic Vicariate of Kabgayi and the Apostolic Vicariate of Nyundo. The Apostolic Vicariate of Urundi was also created on 25 April 1922, serving the territory of what is now Burundi and led by Bishop Julien-Louis-Edouard-Marie Gorju. On 14 July 1949 it was renamed to the Apostolic Vicariate of Kitega, and on 10 November 1959 was elevated to the Archdiocese of Gitega.

== Congo ==
The Apostolic Vicariate of Kivu was restored on 26 December 1929 serving the eastern Belgian Congo, led by Bishop Edoardo Luigi Antonio Leys. He was succeeded in 1944 by Bishop Richard Cleire. On 10 January 1952, after losing territory to the Apostolic Vicariate of Kasongo it was renamed the Apostolic Vicariate of Costermansville, led by Bishop Xavier Geeraerts. On 6 January 1954 this became the Apostolic Vicariate of Bukavu, which on 10 November 1959 was promoted to the Metropolitan Archdiocese of Bukavu.

== See also ==
- Catholic Church in Burundi
- Catholic Church in the Democratic Republic of the Congo
- Catholic Church in Rwanda
