= Apostolic Vicariate of Southern Victoria Nyanza =

Apostolic Vicariate of Southern Victoria Nyanza Vicariatus Apostolicus Victoriensis–Nyanzensis Meridionalis

Location
- Country: German East Africa

Information
- Established: 1894–1929

The Apostolic Vicariate of Southern Nyanza (Latin: Vicariatus Apostolicus Victoriensis–Nyanzensis Meridionalis) was a Roman Catholic mission territory in Eastern and Central Africa. It was an apostolic vicariate split out from the larger Vicariate of Nyanza in June 1894. It lost territory to the Apostolic Vicariate of Kivu in 1912, and was divided into the vicariates of Bukoba and Mwanza in 1929.

== Background ==
John Joseph Hirth was consecrated Vicar Apostolic of Nyanza on 25 May 1890. This area included parts of modern-day Uganda, Rwanda, Burundi and northern Tanzania. A civil war broke out in Buganda in 1892, during which the Catholic camp was totally defeated. Hirth and the White Fathers moved to the Bukoba kingdoms of Kiziba and Bugabo in 1892 with about fifty Baganda Christian converts. In December 1892 they founded a mission at Kashozi, in what is now the extreme north of Tanzania. In 1894 the diocese of Nyanza was split into Southern Nyanza, south and west of Lake Victoria, an eastern portion called "Upper Nile" that was given to the English Mill Hill Missionaries, and a northern portion called "Northern Nyanza" that covered the south and west of today's Uganda. Hirth was appointed vicar Apostolic of Southern Nyanza on 13 July 1894.

== Location ==
The Vicariate lay to the north of the Apostolic Vicariate of Unyanyembe, and comprised the land surrounding the southern half of Lake Victoria from Lake Kivu in the west to Lake Natron in the east, on the Anglo-German colonial frontier of the time (36º E). The mission thus included the northern portion of German East Africa. According to the 1913 Catholic Encyclopedia, "The vicariate contains about 2,500,000 pagans, 7000 Catholics, 12,000 catechumens, 30 White Fathers; 23 lay brothers; 6 Missionary Sisters of Notre-Dame-d'Afrique; 20 churches or chapels; 15 stations; 85 schools with 3900 pupils; 190 catechists; 4 orphanages and 5 dispensaries; and a meteorological station belonging to the missionaries."

== History ==
Hirth made Kashozi his Episcopal See. He later moved to Rubya, where he founded a seminary, and was personally involved in training future priests for Bukoba and Rwanda. Joseph Sweens was appointed coadjutor bishop to Hirth on 17 December 1909. He reached South Nyanza in April 1910. Hirth returned to his old residence at Kashozi, leaving Sweens to live at the seminary of Rubya. For the next three years Sweens visited the different stations of the diocese, resolved problems and represented the diocese to the civil authorities.

In 1912 the missions of Burundi, formerly part of the Vicariate of Unyanyembe, were joined with the missions of Rwanda to form the new Apostolic Vicariate of Kivu, with Hirth as the first Vicar Apostolic. South Nyanza now consisted only of the regions of Bukoba and Mwanza to the south of Lake Victoria. On 12 December 1912 Sweens succeeded Hirth as Vicar Apostolic of South Nyanza. On 15 January 1915 the territory was renamed the Vicariate Apostolic of Victoria-Nyanza. In April 1929 the vicariate was divided into two more manageable units, the vicariates of Bukoba and Mwanza.
