= Bukoba =

Town in Kagera Region, Tanzania

Bukoba Kagera
- Town of Kagera Region
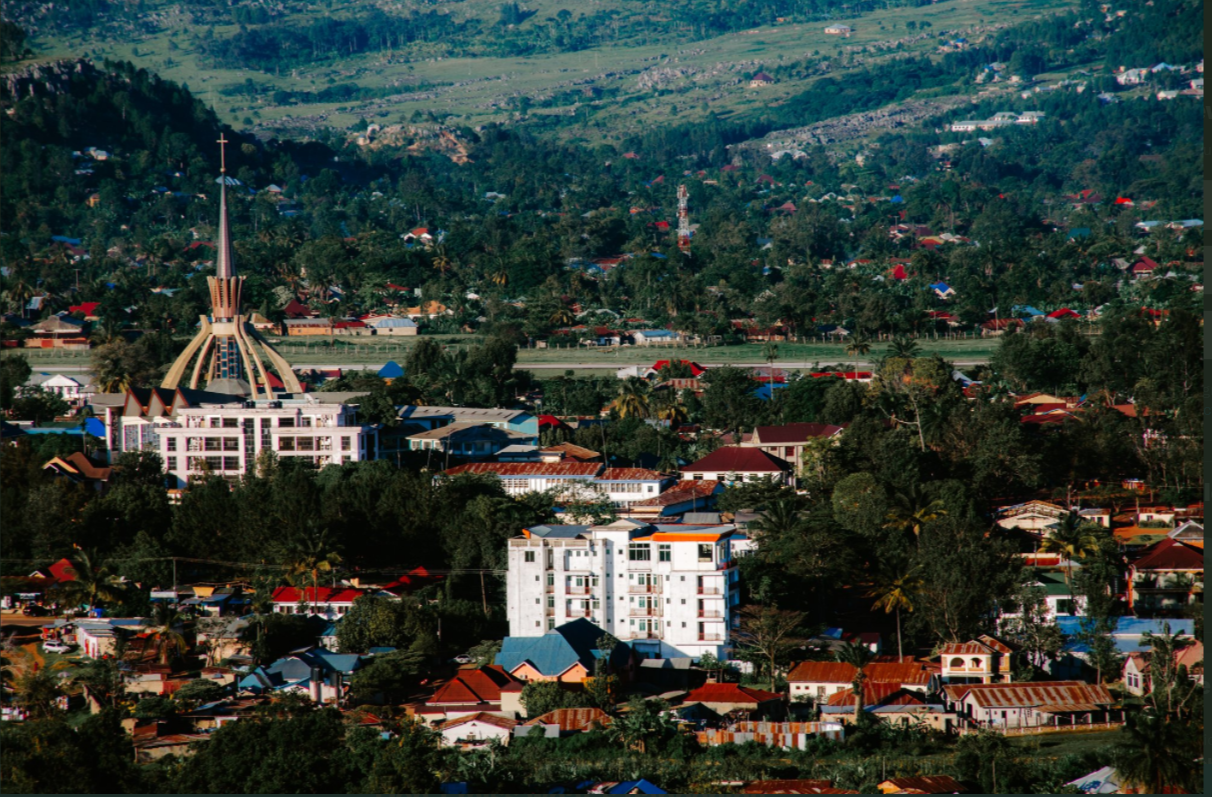
- Bukoba in 2021

- Location of Bukoba Bukoba (Africa) Bukoba (Earth)
- Coordinates: 1°20′S 31°49′E
- Country: Tanzania
- Region: Kagera Region
- District: Bukoba Urban District

Population (2022 census)
  - Urban: 144,938
  - Rural: 322,448
- Time zone: UTC+3 (East Africa Time)
- Area code: 028
- Climate: Am
- Website: Regional website

Bukoba is a town with a population of 144,938 (2022 census), situated in the northwest of Tanzania on the south-western shores of Lake Victoria. It is the capital of the Kagera region, and the administrative seat for Bukoba Urban District, and is home to Kaitaba Stadium

The town is served by Bukoba Airport and regular ferry connections to and from Mwanza, as well as roads to Uganda's Rakai District for cross-border commuters. Plans are underway for a standard gauge railway to Uganda.

== History ==
=== Colonial period ===
The town of Bukoba was founded in 1890 by Emin Pasha as the first German military station on Lake Victoria. The town was founded in the territory of the Lesser Kyamutwara kingdom. Its King, Mukotani, was hospitable to the Germans and directed them against his rivals: Kayoza of Bugabo and Mutatembwa of Kiziba. After Emin raided Bugabo, Kayoza agreed to send support for the station's construction. Following unrest in neighbouring Uganda, the town received fleeing Catholic missionaries on February 1892. The town was developed into a port through which grain, hides, and ivory passed. Riots broke out during the 1905–1907 Maji Maji Rebellion; they were quickly suppressed. As part of a series punitive reprisals, King Ntare of the Karagwe Kingdom was hanged on a tree in Bukoba. The Germans constructed a 54 m^{2} (65 yd^{2}) fort in 1901. By 1914, Bukoba hosted one of three transmission stations in German East Africa, alongside Dar es Salaam and Mwanza. During the East African campaign in World War I, the town was sacked by the British on 2 June 1915. The British launched another raid on 21–23 June, launching attacks from Kisumu. Pillaging and rape were reported to be widespread, and the town was left abandoned after the attacks. After the war, German East Africa was transferred to British control in the 1919 Paris Peace Conference.

=== Post-independence ===
In the initial actions of the Uganda–Tanzania War, Bukoba was bombed by Ugandan MiG aircraft on 18 October 1978, spreading panic but causing little destruction. Another bombing was attempted on 27 October; most bombs landed in forests or Lake Victoria, but one narrowly missed Bukoba's hospital. Civilians began to flee the town, and by the following morning Bukoba was mostly abandoned.

On 10 September 2016, a magnitude 5.9 earthquake struck east-northeast of Bukoba. Shaking of an estimated MMI IV intensity was felt, and the earthquake destroyed 840 houses and seriously damaged a further 1,264 in the town. At least 19 people were killed and 253 were injured.

== Geography ==
Situated on the south-western shores of Lake Victoria, Bukoba lies only 1 degree south of the Equator.

Bukoba is situated on the south-western shores of Lake Victoria in the north-western region of Tanzania bordering Uganda. The regional capital and Kagera's biggest town is the gateway to the region.

It boasts a white sandy beach, a large market, a port tennis courts and a swimming pool. It has 13 banks, 5 of which take VISA cards in the ATM.

Bukoba Town itself has the status of a municipal Council. It has a municipal Director and other local government officials like other district councils in the region.

=== Climate ===
Bukoba has an upland tropical monsoon climate (Köppen Amb, because every month has a normal mean temperature of between 18 °C and 22 °C) although it is milder than most climates with that classification due to its altitude. It can sometimes get cool especially in the evenings during the two rainy seasons, but never as cold as the winter season in Europe.

Climate data for Bukoba (1991-2020)
Month	Jan	Feb	Mar	Apr	May	Jun	Jul	Aug	Sep	Oct	Nov	Dec	Year
Mean daily maximum °C (°F)	26.4 (79.5)	27.0 (80.6)	26.6 (79.9)	26.0 (78.8)	25.8 (78.4)	25.9 (78.6)	25.7 (78.3)	26.1 (79.0)	26.4 (79.5)	26.3 (79.3)	26.0 (78.8)	26.1 (79.0)	26.2 (79.2)
Mean daily minimum °C (°F)	17.5 (63.5)	17.7 (63.9)	17.8 (64.0)	17.9 (64.2)	18.0 (64.4)	17.4 (63.3)	16.7 (62.1)	17.0 (62.6)	17.2 (63.0)	17.6 (63.7)	17.6 (63.7)	17.5 (63.5)	17.5 (63.5)
Average precipitation mm (inches)	152.8 (6.02)	138.6 (5.46)	250.5 (9.86)	354.4 (13.95)	310.2 (12.21)	60.8 (2.39)	43.3 (1.70)	62.7 (2.47)	108.2 (4.26)	165.2 (6.50)	209.0 (8.23)	169.6 (6.68)	2,025.3 (79.74)
Average precipitation days (≥ 1 mm)	11.8	11.1	16.8	19.3	16.4	4.8	3.8	6.5	9.9	14.6	16.3	14.6	145.9
Source: NOAA

Climate data for Bukoba
Month	Jan	Feb	Mar	Apr	May	Jun	Jul	Aug	Sep	Oct	Nov	Dec	Year
Record high °C (°F)	30.6 (87.1)	31.0 (87.8)	31.4 (88.5)	31.1 (88.0)	30.1 (86.2)	31.1 (88.0)	30.6 (87.1)	28.9 (84.0)	30.0 (86.0)	29.6 (85.3)	30.2 (86.4)	30.3 (86.5)	31.4 (88.5)
Mean daily maximum °C (°F)	26.5 (79.7)	26.6 (79.9)	26.2 (79.2)	25.8 (78.4)	25.6 (78.1)	25.7 (78.3)	25.4 (77.7)	25.5 (77.9)	25.9 (78.6)	26.5 (79.7)	26.2 (79.2)	26.3 (79.3)	26.0 (78.8)
Daily mean °C (°F)	21.3 (70.3)	21.4 (70.5)	21.3 (70.3)	21.3 (70.3)	21.2 (70.2)	20.8 (69.4)	20.3 (68.5)	20.4 (68.7)	20.8 (69.4)	21.3 (70.3)	20.9 (69.6)	20.6 (69.1)	20.9 (69.6)
Mean daily minimum °C (°F)	16.1 (61.0)	16.2 (61.2)	16.3 (61.3)	16.8 (62.2)	16.7 (62.1)	15.9 (60.6)	15.2 (59.4)	15.5 (59.9)	15.7 (60.3)	16.2 (61.2)	15.5 (59.9)	15.0 (59.0)	15.9 (60.6)
Record low °C (°F)	11.1 (52.0)	11.7 (53.1)	10.6 (51.1)	10.6 (51.1)	10.0 (50.0)	12.2 (54.0)	10.6 (51.1)	10.0 (50.0)	10.9 (51.6)	10.6 (51.1)	11.1 (52.0)	12.8 (55.0)	10.0 (50.0)
Average precipitation mm (inches)	154 (6.1)	173 (6.8)	253 (10.0)	367 (14.4)	304 (12.0)	84 (3.3)	51 (2.0)	71 (2.8)	98 (3.9)	170 (6.7)	209 (8.2)	208 (8.2)	2,144 (84.4)
Average precipitation days (≥ 1.0 mm)	13	13	18	20	17	6	5	8	10	15	18	16	158
Average relative humidity (%)	79	79	79	80	80	77	75	78	78	77	79	78	78
Source: Deutscher Wetterdienst

== Economy ==
Kagera's Regional Commissioner resides and has his head office in The Bukoba Central Business District.

Bukoba is the leading district in Tanzania with a high percentage of people with middle-class incomes. The percentage of people living under the poverty line is the lowest in the country. Bukoba has a new mall named Bakwata Complex that will start operation in September 2024.

The town is flat, compact, and surrounded by hills. The town has a bus stand, an airport, and a port. A ferry used to travel from Bukoba via Kemondo Bay Port to Mwanza on Monday, Wednesday and Friday nights, and soon a newly built ship, the second largest lake ship in Africa, will make ferry voyages to Bukoba daily.

== Utilities ==
Bukoba is served by the National Electric Utility Company TANESCO.

== Transport ==
=== Bus ===
A bus leaves for Kampala at 7 am every day (about 6 hours) and from Kampala for Bukoba at 11 am every day.

=== Ports ===
Bukoba Port, located about 3 km (1.9 mi) from the town's centre, is the second-largest Tanzanian port on Lake Victoria after the ports at Mwanza. It handles general loose cargo and passengers, with a designed capacity of 9,500 tonnes of cargo per month. It has an 85 m (279 ft) long main berth and two shorter berths. The port is owned and operated by the Tanzania Ports Authority. It has passenger service to Mwanza North Port.

=== Air ===
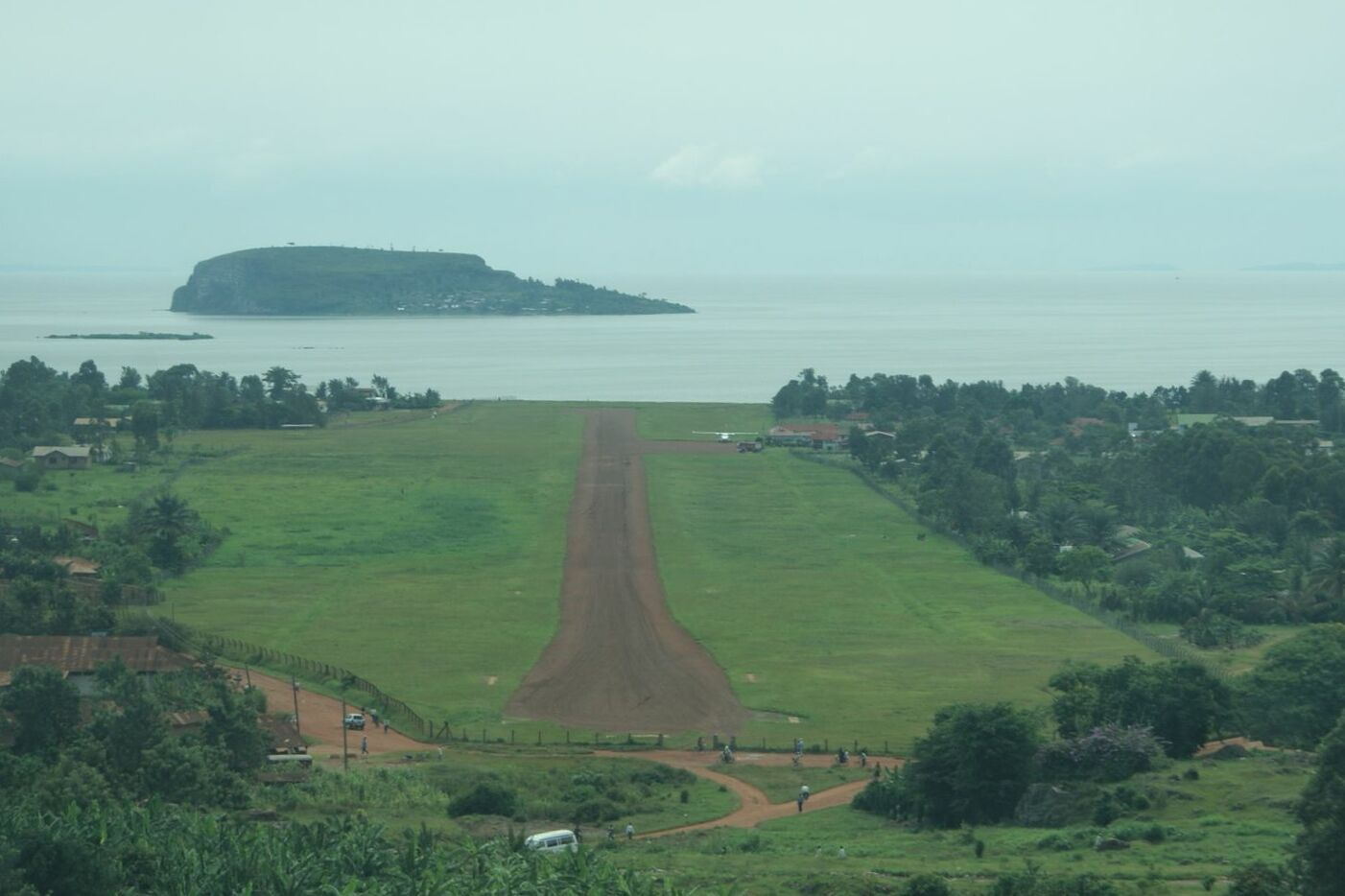
Bukoba Airport

Bukoba Airport is located south east of the city. The address on Sokoine Road.

Auric Air flies three times a day to Mwanza. In 2010 the airport was extended as more flights were expected in line with capacity growth milestones of The Air Terminal reviewed after published reports every quarter of the year. Air Tanzania (ATCL) also have scheduled flights to Bukoba throughout the week with connecting flights through Mwanza to Dar es Salaam.

== Sports ==
Bukoba is represented in the Tanzanian Premier League by football club Kagera Sugar. It is the home to several charities - including SHARE in Africa and Jambo Bukoba. Both are focused on the educational sector.

The Kaitaba Stadium is also found in south east of Bukoba on Jamhuri Road. The stadium has the capacity of 15000 people and supports football games day and night.

== Sister cities ==
- Nykøbing Mors

== Gallery ==
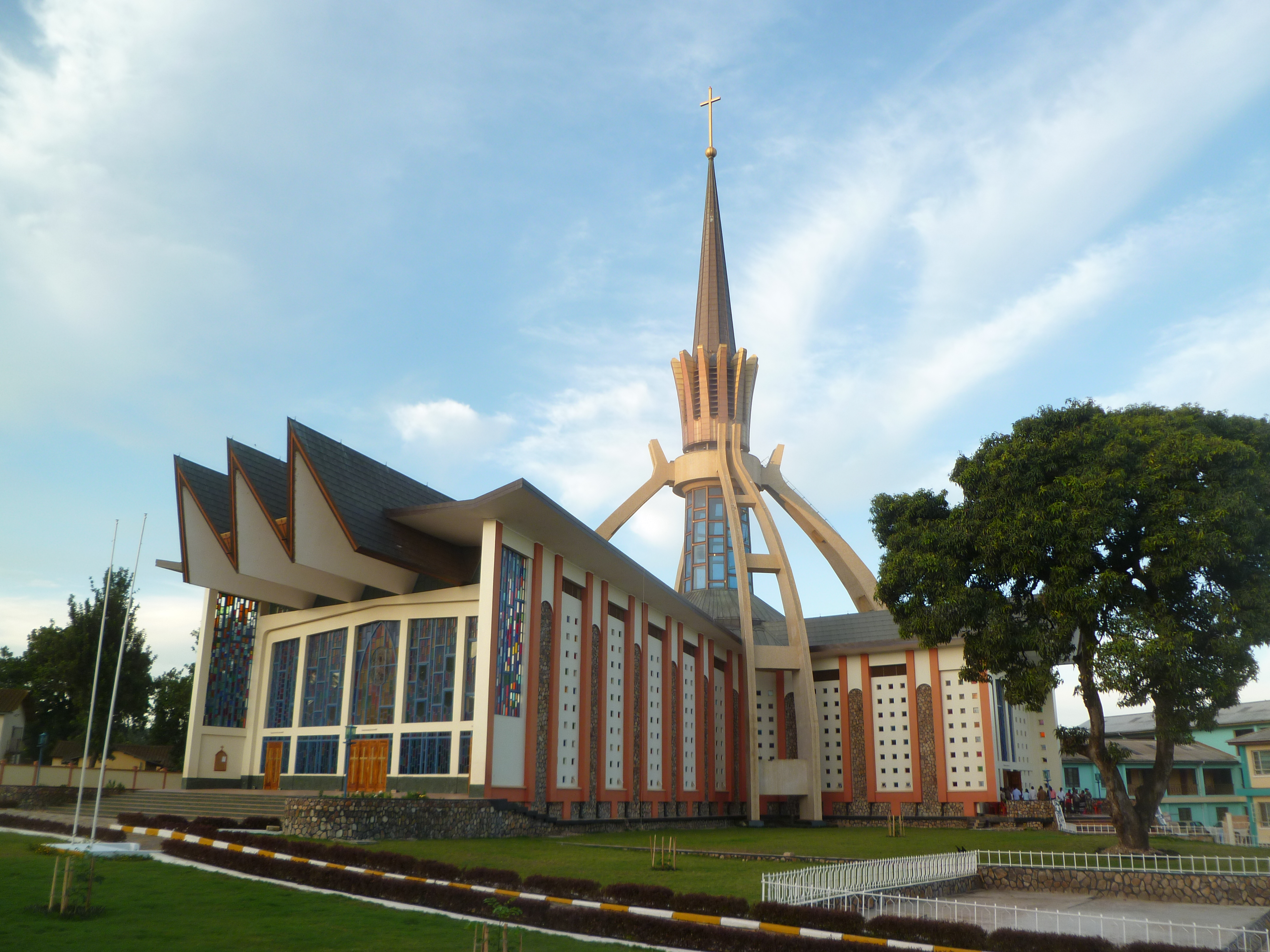
The Mater Misericordiae Church.

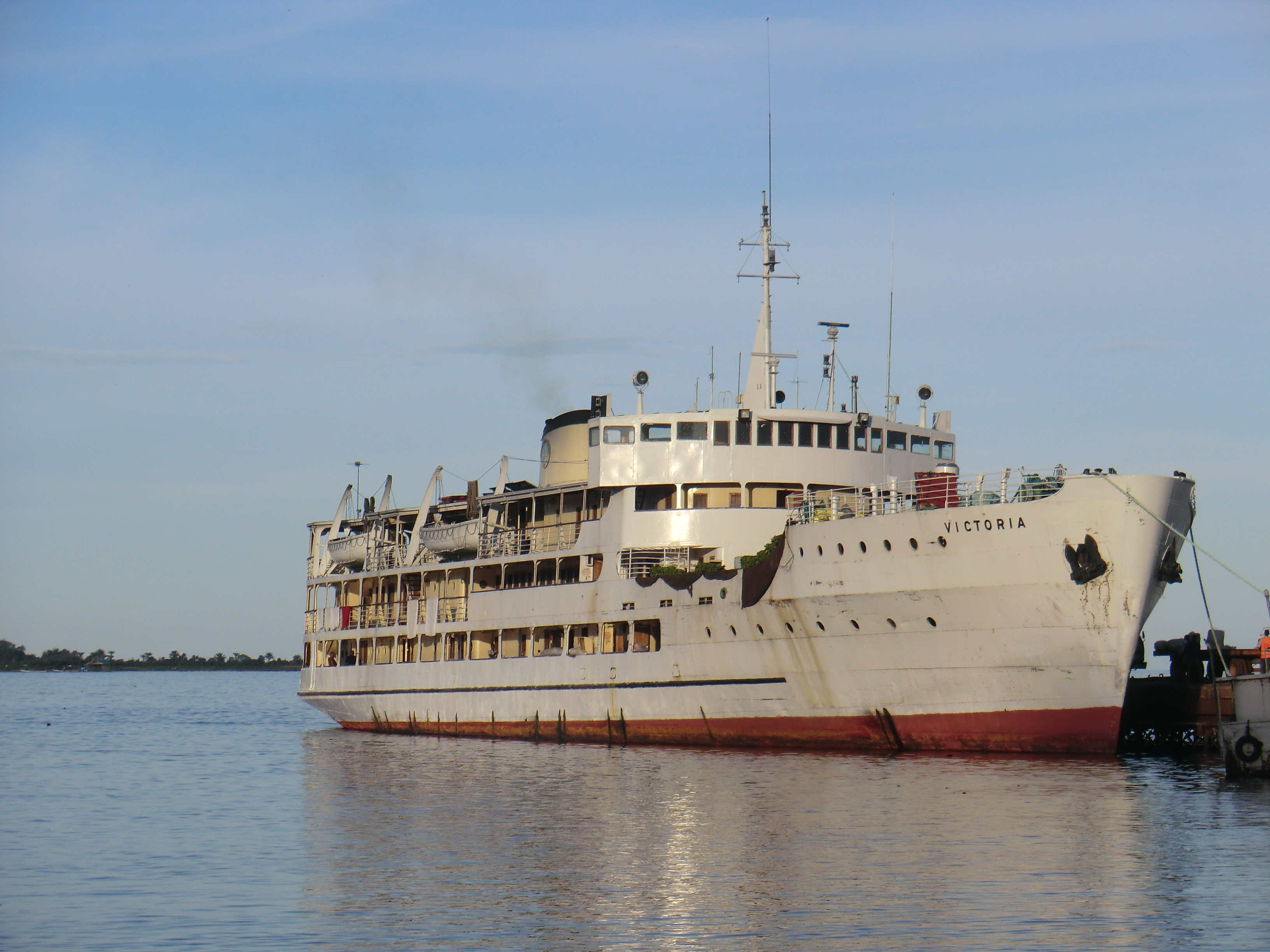
MV Victoria (1959) at Port of Bukoba

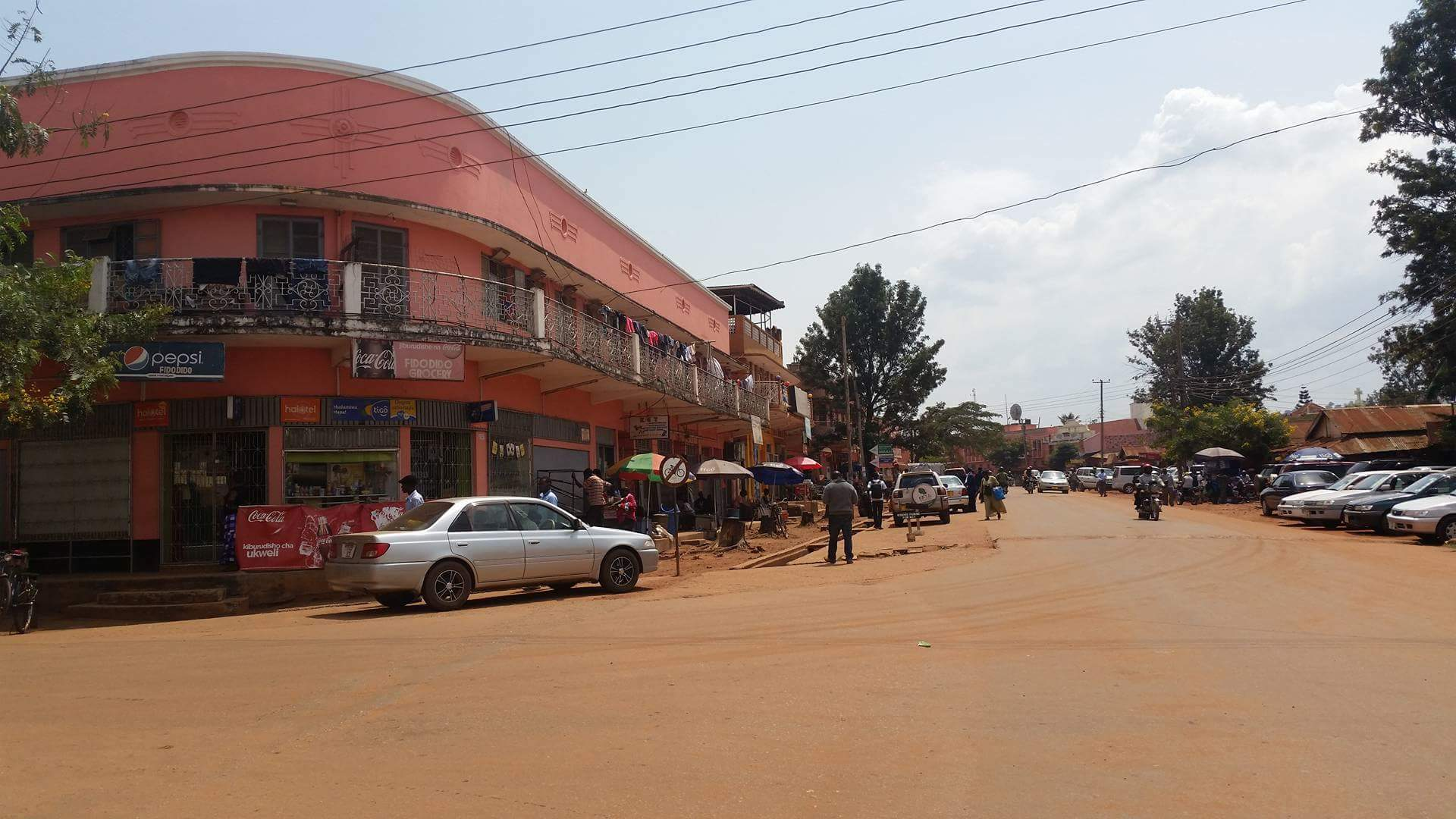
Street in Bukoba
