= List of Catholic dioceses in Rwanda =

The Roman Catholic Church in Rwanda is composed of 1 ecclesiastical territory with 7 suffragan dioceses.

== List of dioceses ==
- Metropolitan Archdiocese of Kigali
  - Diocese of Butare
  - Diocese of Cyangugu
  - Diocese of Gikongoro
  - Diocese of Kabgayi
  - Diocese of Kibungo
  - Diocese of Nyundo
  - Diocese of Ruhengeri
  - Diocese of Byumba
