= Papias Musengamana =

Rwandan Catholic prelate (born 1967)

The Most Reverend Papias Musengamana
- Bishop of Byumba
- Church: Catholic Church
- Archdiocese: Roman Catholic Archdiocese of Kigali
- See: Byumba
- Appointed: 12 August 2024
- Installed: 5 October 2024

Orders
- Ordination: 18 May 1997
- Consecration: 13 May 2022 by Antoine Kambanda

Personal details
- Born: Papias Musengamana; 21 August 1967 (age 58) Byimana, Diocese of Kabgayi, Rwanda

Papias Musengamana (born 21 August 1967) is a Rwandan prelate of the Catholic Church who is the Bishop of the Roman Catholic Diocese of Byumba. He was appointed bishop on 28 February 2022 by Pope Francis.

== Early life and education ==
He was born on 21 August 1967 in Byimana, Diocese of Kabgayi, Rwanda. He attended Mwendo Primary School from 1974 until 1982. He studied at St. Leon Minor Seminary, Kabgayi in Kabgayi from 1982 until 1988. He then attended the Preparatory Seminary at Rutongo, from 1988 until 1989. He studied Philosophy at Kabgayi Major Seminary, from 1989 until 1991. He then entered the Catholic Theological Institute of Yaoundé (French:Institut Catholique de Yaoundé) in Cameroon, graduating from there in 1996 with a Licentiate in Biblical Theology. The institute is a component of the Catholic University of Central Africa. Later, he graduated with a Doctorate in Biblical Theology from the Albert-Ludwigs-Universität Freiburg, in Germany, having studied there from 1999 until 2005.

== Priest ==
He was ordained priest of Kabgayi Diocese on 18 May 1997.

He served in various roles while priest, including as:

- Secretary to the bishop from 1997 until 1999
- Parish vicar in Kamonyi Parish from 2005 until 2006
- Diocesan bursar from 2006 until 2013
- Vicar General of Kabgayi Doicese from 2013 until 2017 and from 2018 until 2024
- Rector of the Saint Charles Borromeo Major Seminary of Nyakibanda.

== Bishop ==
On 12 August 2024, the Holy Father accepted the resignation of Bishop Servilien Nzakamwita of the diocese of Byumba, Rwanda. Pope Francis appointed the Reverend Papias Musengamana, until then priest of the diocese of Kabgayi, as bishop of Byumba, Rwanda.

He was consecrated and installed on 14 May 2022, at Gicumbi Stadium, Byumba, Diocese of Byumba. The Principal Consecrator was Cardinal Antoine Kambanda, Archbishop of Kigali assisted by Bishop Servilien Nzakamwita, Bishop Emeritus of Byumba and Bishop Philippe Rukamba, Bishop of Butare.

Bishop Papias Musengamana succeeded Bishop Emeritus Servilien Nzakamwita, the ordinary of the diocese from 1976 until 2022, whose age-related retirement request was approved by the reigning pope.

== See also ==
- Catholic Church in Rwanda

== Succession table ==
Catholic Church titles
Preceded by Servilien Nzakamwita (13 March 1996 to 28 February 2022)	Bishop of Byumba; Since 28 February 2022	Succeeded by Incumbent
