= Jean-Marie Vianney Twagirayezu =

Rwandan Catholic prelate (born 1960

The Most Reverend Jean-Marie Vianney Twagirayezu
- Bishop of Kibungo, Rwanda
- Church: Catholic Church
- Archdiocese: Roman Catholic Archdiocese of Kigali
- See: Kibungo
- Appointed: 20 February 2023
- Installed: 1 April 2023
- Predecessor: Antoine Kambanda
- Successor: Incumbent

Orders
- Ordination: 8 October 1995
- Consecration: 1 April 2023 by Antoine Cardinal Kambanda
- Rank: Bishop

Personal details
- Born: Jean-Marie Vianney Twagirayezu; 21 July 1960 (age 64); Nyundo, Diocese of Nyundo, Rwanda

Styles of Jean-Marie Vianney Twagirayezu
- Reference style: Your Grace; The Most Reverend
- Spoken style: His Grace
- Religious style: Bishop

Jean-Marie Vianney Twagirayezu (born 21 July 1960) is a Rwandan Roman Catholic prelate who serves as the Bishop of the Roman Catholic Diocese of Kibungo, Rwanda since 2023. Before that, from 8 October 1995 until 20 February 2023 he was a priest of the Roman Catholic Diocese of Nyundo, Rwanda. He was appointed Bishop on 20 February 2023 by Pope Francis.

== Background and priesthood ==
He was born on 21 July 1960 at Nyundo, Diocese of Nyundo, Rubavu District, Western Province, Rwanda. He holds academic qualifications in accounting and commerce, obtained from the Democratic Republic of the Congo (DRC). He then worked for a state-owned company. He studied Philosophy and then studied Theology at St. Charles Borromeo Major Seminary in Nyakibanda, in the Diocese of Kabgayi in Rwanda. He holds a Licentiate in Pastoral Theology and in Project Management from the Catholic University of Louvain, in Belgium.

== Priest ==
He was ordained a priest of the Catholic Diocese of Nyundo, Rwanda on 8 October 1995. As priest, he served in various roles including as:

- Parish priest of St. Mary Mediatrix Parish
- Parish priest of Muramba Parish
- Parish priest of St. Mary Comforter of the Afflicted, Kibingo Parish of the Diocese of Nyundo
- Director of the Caritas Organization, Diocese of Nyundo
- Bursar of the Diocese of Nyundo.
- Secretary General of Caritas Rwanda from 2016 until 2023.

== As bishop ==
On 20 February 2023, Pope Francis appointed Father Monsignor Jean-Marie Vianney Twagirayezu as the new bishop of Kibungo Catholic Diocese.

He was consecrated and installed at the Cyasemakamba Stadium, in Kibungo, Diocese of Kibungo on 1 April 2023 by the hands of Antoine Cardinal Kambanda, Archbishop of Kigali assisted by Bishop Vincent Harolimana, Bishop of Ruhengeri and Bishop Anaclet Mwumvaneza, Bishop of Nyundo. He succeeded Archbishop Antoine Cardinal Kambanda, who was transferred to Kigali as Archbishop and was appointed Apostolic Administrator at Kibungo since 2018.

== See also ==
- Catholic Church in Botswana

== Succession table ==
Catholic Church titles
Preceded by Antoine Kambanda (7 May 2013 - 19 November 2018)	Bishop of Kibungo (since 20 February 2023)	Succeeded by Incumbent
