= Abortion in Rwanda =

In Rwanda, abortion is only permitted if the pregnancy threatens the life or health of the mother, risks fetal defects, or if it resulted from rape, incest, forced marriage, or sex with a minor. Abortions must be performed at an approved medical facility before a gestational age of 22 weeks, or later if medically necessary. Parental consent is required for minors. Illegal abortions are punishable by fines or prison. Despite the legality of abortion, illegal and unsafe abortions are common.

Rwanda's 1977 penal code permitted only therapeutic abortions approved by two physicians. In the 2010s, maternal health initiatives of the Ministry of Health addressed unsafe abortion, while pro-abortion advocacy groups such as the Youth Action Movement reported on people imprisoned for abortions. Influenced by such advocacy, the 2012 revision to the penal code included an amendment to the abortion law, which faced opposition from religious groups. This lifted the country's reservation to the Maputo Protocol, reduced prison sentences, and decriminalized abortions if a court ruled that the pregnancy resulted from rape, incest, or forced marriage. The Ministry of Health began a program to implement the law, but legal abortions remained rare, limited by the requirements for court orders and physician approval. These requirements were lifted by a penal code amendment enacted by a 2019 ministerial order, which also added minor status as a legal ground for abortion, established a gestational limit, and required that abortions be performed by physicians at high-level facilities. A 2021 Supreme Court case argued that these narrow requirements were inequitable, and a 2024 ministerial order broadened the requirements. President Paul Kagame pardoned hundreds of people imprisoned for abortions between 2016 and 2023.

Abortion and unintended pregnancy are stigmatized in Rwanda, and many people oppose abortion due to cultural or Christian views. Legal abortions are difficult to access, and many abortions are either self-induced or performed by folk healers, especially in rural areas. Patients seeking abortions at hospitals may face delays or opposition from staff. Post-abortion care is available at public and private non-religious facilities, but only two-thirds of patients receive it.

== Legislation ==
The penal code of Rwanda permits abortion in cases of risk to life, risk to health, or fetal defects, as well as pregnancy from rape, incest, or forced marriage. A law also permits minors to have abortions. Judicial evidence is not needed to prove grounds for abortion; abortion patients who are found to have lied about these grounds are liable for illegal abortion. The gestational limit is 22 weeks for abortions that are not medically necessary. Abortions must be performed at approved medical facilities. Parental consent is required for minors who receive abortions. Spousal consent is recommended but not required. It is unclear whether conscientious objection to abortion is allowed—though the law does not mention it, the Code of Professional Conduct of Nurses and Midwives allows objection to any procedure provided it does not violate the professional duty.

Under Article 123 of the penal code, self-induced abortion is punishable by a prison sentence of one to three years and a fine of 100,000 to 200,000 francs. Article 124 sets a sentence of three to five years, which is increased to twenty to twenty-five years if the procedure results in disability or life imprisonment if it results in death. The same article says negligence that results in abortion is punishable by a prison sentence of one to two years and a fine of 300,000 to 500,000 francs. If the provider of an illegal abortion is a medical professional, they may lose their license for three to five years. Advertising abortion is also punishable by a prison sentence of six months to two years. Some cases of abortions are prosecuted as cases of infanticide, which is punishable by life imprisonment.

== History ==
=== Abortion ban ===
The penal code of Rwanda, enacted in 1977, included an abortion ban. The abortion law was similar to Article 317 of the French Penal Code of 1810, including wording from a 1939 amendment. The law permitted abortion only medically necessary abortions, as determined by two physicians, and it set a prison sentence of five to fifteen years for performing illegal abortions. The medical approval of an abortion was required to be recorded in copies given to the provider, the patient, and the two physicians who gave approval. Abortion was widely considered illegal. Rape during the Rwandan genocide of 1994 led many women to receive abortions, while others were pressured to do so by their families. United Nations aid workers began providing reproductive health services in 1996, but they did not provide abortions. After the genocide, the government began initiatives toward gender equality in Rwanda, contributing to abortion reform.

The Association Rwandaise pour le Bien-Être Familial (ARBEF; Rwandan Association for the Promotion of Family Welfare) began working as an affiliate of Planned Parenthood in 1987. In 2009, the Dutch reproductive rights NGO Rutgers WPF, in collaboration with Planned Parenthood, formed the Youth Action Movement (YAM) with youth groups from several countries, including the youth wing of ARBEF. YAM Rwanda led initiatives on unsafe abortion in 2010 and 2011, collecting data and testimonials from hospitals and prisons; it reported in July 2010 that, 21 of the 114 women at Karubanda Prison were charged with abortion, of which 90% were under 26. The group presented its findings at meetings with university students, youth organizations, and officials. News agencies and radio stations reported from YAM Rwanda's workshops, with some discussing abortion on their front pages. The Ministry of Health began addressing unsafe abortion in 2010 as part of its focus on maternal health. This included a program that introduced post-abortion care to primary healthcare facilities nationwide.

Before abortion was decriminalized, the legal restrictiveness led many medical providers to avoid abortions even when legal, so women instead received unsafe abortions from illegal providers. A 2009 study estimated that the country had an abortion rate of 25 per 1,000 women of reproductive age, as well as 16,700 cases of post-abortion care. The highest abortion rate was in Kigali, where services were more available. The illegality and stigmatization of abortion often led women in the country to avoid PAC, even for spontaneous abortions. Many women were arrested for abortions after being reported by people they knew personally. In 2008–2013, Rwanda had 227 women imprisoned on abortion charges, out of a total of 7,807 women imprisoned, according to official statistics. However, a 2015 study of five prisons found that over one-fifth of women in each prison faced abortion charges.

=== 2012 penal code revision ===
Human rights organizations and advocacy groups such as YAM Rwanda influenced the inclusion of an abortion law in the 2012 revision to Rwanda's penal code. The African women's rights advocacy coalition SOAWR petitioned President Paul Kagame to reform Rwanda's abortion law in a May 2012 letter. It was opposed by many religious leaders. The abortion article received more attention than the rest of the penal code revision. Several opponents of the law appeared at a news conference at Village Urugwiro in May 2012. The following month, the Ministry of Justice wrote to the Parliament of Rwanda requesting that the country remove its reservation to Article 14 of the Maputo Protocol, which provided for a right to abortion on grounds similar to the proposed penal code. The Principal State Attorney, Frank Mwine Mugisha, said, "Our laws would be contradictory with the Protocol if we don't remove reservations. Once the reservations are removed, then the new Penal Code will be incorporating the Maputo provisions."

The penal code revision was passed on 14 June 2012, including an abortion law in Article 162. This added the legal grounds of rape, incest, and forced marriage, and it reduced the prison sentence for illegal abortions to one to three years. Court orders were required to prove non-medical grounds. The country also removed its reservations to the Maputo Protocol at this time. The Penal Code amendment did not specify whether these grounds also included statutory rape of minors. The passage of this legislation lessened the taboo about abortion. The Ministry of Health, Ministry of Justice, Ministry of Gender and Family Promotion, National Women's Council, and National Youth Council participated in discussions about the subject. The Ministry of Health began the Operationalization of the Penal Code of 2012 Program in January 2013, with the goals of making safe abortion available to everyone and reducing abortion complications by 75% by 2018. With partners including the Rwanda Society of Obstetricians and Gynecologists, this program developed a protocol for implementation and training materials; it trained twenty-four healthcare professionals in 2014 and held orientation meetings with 138 stakeholders across 8 locations. The program also led to the registration and availability of misoprostol and mifepristone.

Under the 2013 abortion law, women seeking abortions were limited by the requirement of a court order, which involved the reporting of an incident within 72 hours, followed by a legal process. Some victims who succeeded in receiving court orders did so too late to receive an abortion. The requirement for the approval of two physicians was also limiting since Rwanda had only one doctor per 16,000 to 17,000 people, concentrated in urban areas; rural areas also lacked facilities that can legally provide the procedure. Abortion activists from ARBEF and HDI said that the penal code amendment did not resolve the issue of unsafe abortion. Lawyer Tom Mulisa said that, a year after the amendment, the courts had heard no abortion cases, with the legal requirements being too difficult for most people to go through.

Misoprostol was added to Rwanda's essential medicines list in 2015, with the goal of the availability of all abortion methods recommended by the World Health Organization. In March 2016, the Rwanda Law Reform Commission proposed that being a minor should be a legal ground for abortion as sex with a minor was illegal. It received support from some legislators and members of the public. In December 2016, Kagame issued 62 pardons to people who had received abortions before the age of sixteen. A 2016 article in The New Times reported that legal abortion remained infeasible, with court cases sometimes lasting over a year. Between 2012 and 2018, there were only five court cases requesting legal abortions.

=== 2018 penal code revision ===
A proposal to amend the penal code's section on abortion was passed by the Parliament in December 2017. The amendment removed the requirement for court orders. Civil society groups such as HDI supported this change. It also allowed minors to get abortions, with the requirement of parental accompaniment. This requirement was supported by members of parliament including Euthalie Nyirabega, saying parents would protect their children against unnecessary abortions. The amendment also removed the requirement for the approval of two physicians. It was enacted in October 2018 and came into effect in April 2019, with the passage of Ministerial Order No. 002/MoH/2019. This order established a gestational limit of 22 weeks and required abortions to be performed at hospitals or polyclinics. Some members of the public opposed the ministerial order, saying it may make abortion too easy. The Safe Abortion Guidelines were also enacted in 2019. The New Times reported that the amendment to the abortion law had led to an increase in public requests for abortions.

In April 2019, before the enactment of the ministerial order, Kagame issued a pardon to 367 people charged with abortion, followed by another 52 in October. In May 2020, he pardoned another 50 women charged with abortion, including 6 with life sentences, but Minister for Justice Johnston Busingye said that 9 accomplices would not be pardoned. By September 2023, over 500 pardons had been issued since 2016, with 123 remaining in prison. HDI began a program to assist women who were pardoned, many of whom faced social rejection for having abortions.

The NGO Great Lakes Initiative for Human Rights and Development (GLIfHD) sued the Ministry of Justice over the abortion law in a case heard by the Supreme Court of Rwanda in December 2021. The GLIHD argued that the requirements for providers of abortion led to inequitable access. As an amicus curiae in the case, HDI argued that midwives and nurses, who could legally provide post-abortion care, should be able to provide abortions. GLIHD's Tom Mulisa argued that there were not enough hospitals to perform the procedure. The Ministry of Justice argued that physicians and high-level facilities were required to perform abortions safely. The court's ruling upheld the existing law. The Ministry of Health's plan for comprehensive abortion care for 2022–2024 aimed for the ministry and its Rwanda Biomedical Centre to align with the World Health Organization's guidelines. In 2023, the Protestant Council of Rwanda declared that its health centers—10% of health centers in the country—would stop providing abortions. The archbishop of the Anglican Church of Rwanda, Laurent Mbanda, said, "We are not opposing the law, but our belief does not allow us to support abortion," adding that patients would be referred to other facilities. A ministerial order approved in June 2024 and published in December 2024 expanded the criteria for legal abortion providers, allowing the procedure at health centers or clinics, if authorized by the Ministry of Health, and allowing midwives or nurses to perform it.

== Prevalence ==
In 2015–2019, Rwanda had an estimated annual abortion incidence of 84,300, equal to 29% of unintended pregnancies or 16% of all pregnancies. The abortion rate had stayed stagnant since 1990–1994, since which time the unintended pregnancy rate had decreased by 31%. A 2012 report found that half of all pregnancies were unintended, of which 22% were aborted, and that half of abortions are unsafe. Abortion is stigmatized in the country, which strongly impacts discourse on the subject and leads to a lack of research on the subject by Rwandans.

It is difficult to access safe, legal abortion services in Rwanda. As of 2015, the overwhelming majority of abortions are performed outside of health facilities. As victims of rape are stigmatized, as well as abortion, many victims keep their abortions secret, limiting their access to legal abortion. Illegal abortions are common among people who cannot access sexual and reproductive health services or who fear public stigma. These often result in complications. As of 2013, 34% of abortions in the country are performed by folk healers, are 17% are self-induced, with 40% of abortions resulting in complications. Such abortions are particularly common among poor or rural women. Self-induced abortions often use herbal or pharmaceutical products acquired within social networks.

Many hospitals, including religious hospitals, do not provide abortion, and many patients face delays when sent between hospitals for the procedure. Another reason for delay is that, for community-based health insurance plans to cover costs, a patient must get a referral from a health center before going to a hospital. Abortion patients may face resistance from healthcare professionals based on their moral beliefs; ethical guidelines for physicians do not list a duty to provide abortions. Health workers may also report recipients of illegal abortions to authorities, despite medical privacy guidelines. Some facilities block access to abortion medications out of fear of abuse.

Rwanda has high rates of fertility, unintended pregnancy, and sexual violence. Unintended pregnancy is stigmatized, and Rwandan norms extend this stigma to the family, so women with unintended pregnancies are often motivated to abort to avoid this. Educated women with unintended pregnancies may have abortions to avoid the social consequences, and students often have abortions to complete their education. Many people, including judges and health providers, do not know of the abortion law. Many areas are policed by Community Policing Committees, which may enforce an abortion ban based on moral values, often violating rights to confidentiality. A 2025 survey of youths in Kigali found that 79.8% had knowledge of the availability of safe, legal abortion.

== Post-abortion care ==
Post-abortion care (PAC) is available at public and private hospitals and health centers in Rwanda. Some Catholic and other religious facilities do not provide PAC. Only two-thirds of abortion patients seek PAC, with poor women being less likely to receive it. Initiatives by the Ministry of Health have focused on implementing adequate PAC services. The Operationalization of the Penal Code 2012 Program introduced manual vacuum aspiration and misoprostol to many hospitals. After the program, use of the non-recommended dilation and curettage method decreased from 39% to 1%, and misoprostol was used in 83% of PAC cases.

According to a 2012 estimate, the annual spending on PAC by the Rwandan healthcare system was 1.7 million US dollars, of which 51% was for direct medical costs. Most of the cost was to treat incomplete abortion, followed by sepsis and septic shock. A 2022 study of twelve countries found that Rwanda had the lowest cost of PAC per patient, at 51.44 US dollars.

== Debate and advocacy ==
Many people oppose abortion, believing that it violates Rwandan culture or religious beliefs; some believe that abortion causes psychological harm or infertility or that legal abortion would cause misuse of health services or increased sexual activity. A study of healthcare professionals in Kigali in the 2010s found that some support the legalization of abortion as a way to reduce stigma, while others oppose it, believing that health workers who provide abortions would be stigmatized.

As a predominantly Christian country, Christian opposition to abortion is common in Rwanda, including from Catholics, the largest affiliation. Organizations affiliated with the Catholic Church and Evangelical Christian groups have opposed legalizing abortion. The anti-abortion advocacy group Human Life International also has a Rwandan branch.
