= Vincent Harolimana =

Rwandan Catholic prelate (born 1962

The Most Reverend Vincent Harolimana
- Bishop of Ruhengeri
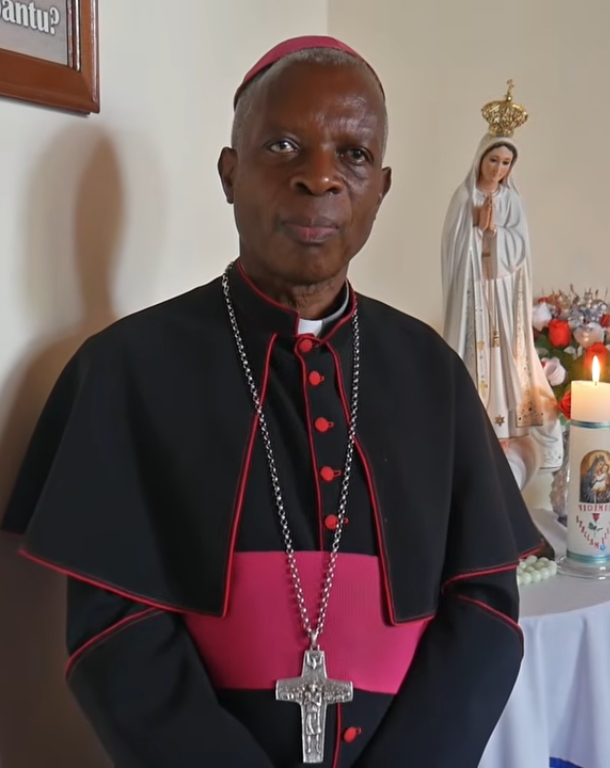
- Church: Catholic Church
- Archdiocese: Roman Catholic Archdiocese of Kigali
- See: Ruhengeri
- Appointed: 31 January 2012
- Installed: 24 March 2012
- Predecessor: Kizito Bahujimihigo
- Successor: Incumbent

Orders
- Ordination: 8 September 1990 by Pope John Paul II
- Consecration: 24 March 2012 by Alexis Habiyambere
- Rank: Bishop

Personal details
- Born: Vincent Harolimana; 2 September 1962 (age 63) Mpembe, Karongi District, Western Province, Rwanda

Styles of Vincent Harolimana
- Reference style: Your Grace; The Most Reverend
- Spoken style: His Grace
- Religious style: Bishop

Vincent Harolimana, (born 2 September 1962), is a Rwandan Roman Catholic prelate who serves as the Bishop of the Roman Catholic Diocese of Ruhengeri, Rwanda since 2012. Before that, from 8 September 1990 until 31 January 2012 he was a priest of the Roman Catholic Diocese of Nyundo, Rwanda. He was appointed Bishop on 31 January 2012 by Pope Benedict XVI.

== Background and priesthood ==
He was born on 2 September 1962 at Mpembe, Mubuga Parish, in the diocese of Nyundo, in the Western Province of Rwanda. He attended St. Pious X Minor Seminary in Nyundo for both his elementary and secondary school education. From 1983 until 1984, he studied for his preparatory year at Rutongo Preparatory Seminary.

He then studied at St. Charles Major Seminary of Nyakibanda in Butare Diocese, where he studied both philosophy and theology from 1984 until 1990. He graduated from there with a Bachelor of Arts degree in Theology. From 1993 he studied at the Pontifical Gregorian University in Rome Italy. He graduated in 1999 with a Doctorate in Dogmatic Theology.

== Priest ==
He was ordained a priest of the Catholic Diocese of Nyundo, Rwanda on 8 September 1990 by the hands of Pope John Paul II during The Holy Father's visit to Rwanda. He served in that capacity until 31 January 2012.

As a priest, he served in various roles including as:

- Vicar in the Gisenyi Parish from 1990 until 1993.
- Rector of the Petit Séminaire St. Pious X in Nyundo Diocese from 2006
- Visiting professor of Dogmatic Theology at the Nyakibanda Major Seminary since 2004.
- Visiting professor of Dogmatic Theology at the Institut d'Enseignement Supérieur (INES) in Ruhengeri (English: Institute of Applied Sciences, Ruhengeri) since 2004.
- Member of the Board of Consultants, of the Diocesan Commission for Economic Affairs, for the Pastoral Care of Vocations, for the Liturgy and Sacred Music.
- Chaplain of the Fraternite Notre-Dame de la Resurrection (consecrated widows) and the Soeurs de Saint Vincent de Paul in Nyundo.

== As bishop ==
On 31 January 2012, Pope Benedict XVI appointed Reverend Father Vincent Harolimana as the new bishop of Ruhengeri Catholic Diocese in Rwanda.

He was consecrated and installed in Ruhengeri, Diocese of Ruhengeri on 24 March 2012 by the hands of Bishop Alexis Habiyambere, Bishop of Nyundo assisted by Archbishop Thaddée Ntihinyurwa, Archbishop of Kigali and Bishop Smaragde Mbonyintege, Bishop of Kabgayi. As of 2023 Bishop Vincent Harolimana was the vice president of Caritas Rwanda.

== See also ==
- Catholic Church in Rwanda

== Succession table ==
Catholic Church titles
Preceded by Kizito Bahujimihigo (21 November 1997 - 28 August 2007)	Bishop of Ruhengeri (since 31 January 2012)	Succeeded by Incumbent
