= Frédéric Rubwejanga =

Rwandan Roman Catholic prelate (born 1931)

The Most Reverend Frédéric Rubwejanga
- Bishop Emeritus of Kibungo, Rwanda
- Church: Catholic Church
- Archdiocese: Roman Catholic Archdiocese of Kigali
- See: Roman Catholic Diocese of Kibungo
- Appointed: 30 March 1992
- Installed: 5 July 1992
- Term ended: 28 August 2007
- Predecessor: Joseph Sibomana
- Successor: Kizito Bahujimihigo

Orders
- Ordination: 20 September 1959
- Consecration: 5 July 1992 by Jozef Cardinal Tomko
- Rank: Bishop

Personal details
- Born: Frédéric Rubwejanga; 1931 (age 94–95) Nyabinyenga, Nyanza District, Southern Province, Rwanda

Styles of Frédéric Rubwejanga
- Reference style: Your Lordship; The Most Reverend
- Spoken style: His Lordship
- Religious style: Bishop

Bishop Frédéric Rubwejanga O.C.S.O., (born 1931) is a Rwandan Roman Catholic prelate who was the Bishop of the Roman Catholic Diocese of Kibungo, Rwanda from 1992 until 2007. He was appointed bishop by Pope John Paul II on 30 March 1992. He was consecrated and installed there on 5 July 1992. He retired as bishop on 28 August 2007. He lives on as Bishop Emeritus of Kibungo, Rwanda. While in retirement, he became a member of the Order of Cistercians of the Strict Observance (OCSO).

== Background and education ==
He was born in 1931 in Nyabinyenga Village, Cyabakamyi Sector, Nyanza District, Southern Province, Rwanda. He studied philosophy and theology, before he was ordained a priest in September 1959.

He is reported to hold an advanced degree in spiritual theology from the Catholic University of Louvain awarded in 1990.

== Priest ==
On 20 September 1959 he was ordained a priest at Nyabinyenga, in the Apostolic Vicariate of Kabgayi. He served in that capacity until March 1992. At the time that he was appointed bishop, he served as a professor of theology at the Nyakibanda Major Seminary near Butare.

== Bishop ==
On 30 March 1992, Pope John Paul II appointed Reverend Father Frédéric Rubwejanga as Bishop of the Roman Catholic Diocese of Kibungo in Rwanda. He was consecrated and installed at Kibungo, in the Diocese of Kibungo on 5 July 1992. The Principal Consecrator was Jozef Cardinal Tomko, Cardinal-Deacon of Gesù Buon Pastore alla Montagnola assisted by Archbishop Vincent Nsengiyumva, Archbishop of Kigali, and Bishop Joseph Sibomana, Bishop Emeritus of Kibungo.

On 28 August 2007, Pope Benedict XVI accepted the age-related resignation from the pastoral care of the diocese of Kibungo in Rwanda that was presented by Bishop Frédéric Rubwejanga. The Holy Father Pope Benedict XVI the same day, appointed Bishop Kizito Bahujimihigo, until that time the Bishop of the Roman Catholic Diocese of Ruhengeri as the new Ordinary of Kibungo Catholic Diocese in Rwanda.

While in retirement as Bishop Emeritus of Kibungo, Rwanda, Bishop Frédéric Rubwejanga, took vows professing to be a member of the Order of Cistercians of the Strict Observance, (O.C.S.O.), on 1 November 2010, when he was three months shy of 80 years of age.

== See also ==
- Catholic Church in Rwanda

== Succession table ==
Catholic Church titles
Preceded by Joseph Sibomana (5 September 1968 - 30 March 1992)	Bishop of Kibungo (30 March 1992 - 28 August 2007)	Succeeded by Kizito Bahujimihigo (28 August 2007 - 29 January 2010)
