= Nyundo =

Nyundo may refer to:

- Nyundo, Kenya, a settlement in Kenya's Coast Province
- Nyundo, Rubavu, a mission in Rwanda on the Sebeya River to the east of Gisenyi
- Roman Catholic Diocese of Nyundo, a diocese of the Roman Catholic Church in Rwanda with headquarters at Nyundo
- Mwabaya Nyundo, a settlement in Kenya's Coast Province
