= Philippe Rukamba =

Rwandan Catholic prelate (born 1948)

The Most Reverend Philippe Rukamba
- Bishop Emeritus of Butare, Rwanda
- Church: Catholic Church
- Archdiocese: Roman Catholic Archdiocese of Kigali
- See: Butare
- Appointed: 2 January 1997
- Installed: 12 April 1997
- Predecessor: Jean-Baptiste Gahamanyi
- Successor: Jean Bosco Ntagungira
- Other post(s): Apostolic Administrator of Gikongoro, Rwanda (28 May 2012 - 26 November 2014)

Orders
- Ordination: 25 July 1974
- Consecration: 12 April 1997 by Joseph Sibomana
- Rank: Bishop

Personal details
- Born: Philippe Rukamba; 26 May 1948 (age 77); Kabarondo, Kayonza District, Eastern Province, Rwanda
- Motto: “Considerate Iesum” (No translation known)

Styles of Philippe Rukamba
- Reference style: Your Lordship; The Most Reverend
- Spoken style: His Lordship
- Religious style: Bishop

Philippe Rukamba (born 26 May 1948) is a Rwandan Roman Catholic prelate who served as the Bishop of the Roman Catholic Diocese of Butare, Rwanda from 1997 until his age-related retirement in 2024. Between May 2012 and November 2014, he served as the Apostolic Administrator of the Catholic Diocese of Gikongoro, in Rwanda. He was appointed bishop of Butare on 2 January 1997 by Pope John Paul II. He retired on 12 August 2024 at the age of 76 years. He lives on as the Bishop Emeritus of Butare, Rwanda.

== Early life and education ==
He was born on 26 May 1948 in Kabarondo, Kayonza District, Eastern Province in the Diocese of Kibungo, in Rwanda. He was baptized on 29 May 1948.

He studied in primary schools in Rwinkwavu, Rulindo, Rwamagana and Zaza, in that order. He entered the Minor Seminary of Kabgayi in 1961. He transferred to the Saint Paul Seminary in Kigali in 1965. He began his studies at Nyakibanda Major Seminary on 14 September 1968, where he studied both philosophy and Theology.

== Priest ==
He was ordained a priest of Kibungo on 25 July 1974. He served in that capacity until 2 January 1997.

== Bishop ==
On 2 January 1997, Pope John Paul II appointed him as Bishop of the Roman Catholic Diocese of Butare. On 12 April 1997, he was consecrated and installed at the Our Lady of Wisdom Cathedral in Butare by the hands of Bishop Joseph Sibomana, Bishop Emeritus of Kibungo assisted by Bishop Jean-Baptiste Gahamanyi, Bishop Emeritus of Butare and Bishop Frédéric Rubwejanga, Bishop of Kibungo. He served as the president of the Rwanda Catholic Bishops' Conference starting in 2015 for more than one term.

Bishop Rukamba retired on 12 August 2024 at the age of 76 years. He was succeeded by Bishop Jean Bosco Ntagungira as the Ordinary at Butare.

== See also ==
- Catholic Church in Rwanda

== Succession table ==
Catholic Church titles
Preceded by Jean-Baptiste Gahamanyi (11 September 1961 - 2 January 1997)	Bishop of Butare (2 January 1997 - 12 August 2024)	Succeeded by Jean Bosco Ntagungira
