= Irreligion in Rwanda =

Irreligion in Rwanda is uncommon among Rwandans, as Christianity is the predominant faith. It is difficult to quantify the number of atheists or agnostics in Rwanda as they are not officially counted in the census of the country. There is a great stigma attached to being an atheist in Rwanda, even though many people have become atheists in the aftermath of the Rwandan genocide.

== See also ==
- Religion in Rwanda
- Islam in Rwanda
- Demographics of Rwanda
