= Anaclet Mwumvaneza =

Rwandan Catholic prelate (born 1956)

The Most Reverend Anaclet Mwumvaneza
- Bishop of Nyundo, Rwanda
- Church: Catholic Church
- Archdiocese: Roman Catholic Archdiocese of Kigali
- See: Nyundo
- Appointed: 11 March 2016
- Installed: 21 May 2016
- Predecessor: Alexis Habiyambere
- Successor: Incumbent

Orders
- Ordination: 25 July 1991
- Consecration: 21 May 2016 by Alexis Habiyambere
- Rank: Bishop

Personal details
- Born: Anaclet Mwumvaneza; 4 December 1956 (age 68); Murambi, Rulindo District, Northern Province, Rwanda

Styles of Anaclet Mwumvaneza
- Reference style: Your Lordship; The Most Reverend
- Spoken style: His Lordship
- Religious style: Bishop

Anaclet Mwumvaneza (born 4 December 1956) is a Rwandan Roman Catholic prelate who serves as the Bishop of the Roman Catholic Diocese of Nyundo, Rwanda since 2016. He was appointed bishop of Nyundo on 11 March 2016 by Pope Francis. He succeeded Bishop Alexis Habiyambere, who retired on 11 March 2016.

== Early life and education ==
He was born on 4 December 1956 in Murambi, Rulindo District, Northern Province, Rwanda. This is in Rulindo Parish in the Archdiocese of Kigali.

From 1963 until 1969, he attended primary school in Rulindo. In 1969, he entered St. Leon Minor Seminary, Kabgayi, studying there until 1973. He entered the Séminaire des Aînés in Kabgayi in 1980. From 1984 until 1985 he studied at the Rutongo Preparatory Seminary in the Archdiocese of Kigali. He then transferred to the Nyakibanda Major Seminary, in the diocese of Butare, where he studied philosophy, between 1985 and 1987. He studied theology at the same seminary, starting in 1987 and graduated in 1991. Later, starting in 2000, he studied at the Pontifical Gregorian University, in Rome, Italy, graduating from there in 2004 with a Doctorate in canon law.

== Priest ==
He was ordained a priest of the Catholic Archdiocese of Kigali, Rwanda on 25 July 1991 at the age of 34.6 years. He served in that capacity until 11 March 2016.

As a priest he served in many roles including as:

- Assistant priest and bursar in Kabuye Parish from 1991 until 1992.
- Pastor of the Sainte Famille Parish in Kigali from 1992 until 2000.
- Member of the Board of Consultants and the Financial Board in the Archdiocese of Kigali since 1993.
- Parish priest in Kicukiro Parish from 2004 until 2005.
- Professor of Canon Law in Nyakibanda Seminary from 2004 until 2005.
- Diocesan Director of Caritas in Kigali between 2005 and 2013.
- President of the "Justice and Peace" Commission for the Archdiocese of Kigali from 2005 until 2013.
- Defender of the Bond of the Interdiocesan Ecclesiastical Court in Rwanda since 2013
- Secretary General of Caritas Rwanda, since 2013.

== Bishop ==
On 11 March 2016, Pope Francis appointed him as Bishop of the Roman Catholic Diocese of Nyundo, Rwanda. On 21 May 2016, he was consecrated and installed outside the Nyundo Roman Catholic Cathedral, in Nyundo, Diocese of Nyundo. The Principal Consecrator was Bishop Alexis Habiyambere, Bishop Emeritus of Nyundo assisted by Bishop Philippe Rukamba, Bishop of Butare and Bishop Smaragde Mbonyintege, Bishop of Kabgayi.

== See also ==
- Catholic Church in Rwanda

== Succession table ==
Catholic Church titles
Preceded by Alexis Habiyambere (2 January 1997 - 11 March 2016)	Bishop of Nyundo (since 11 March 2016)	Succeeded by Incumbent
