= Association of Baptist Churches in Rwanda =

Baptist Christian denomination in Rwanda

- Association des Églises baptistes au Rwanda
- Classification: Evangelical Christianity
- Theology: Baptist
- Associations: Baptist World Alliance
- Headquarters: Kigali, Rwanda
- Origin: 1967
- Congregations: 276
- Members: 58,960
- Primary schools: 42
- Secondary schools: 20
- Seminaries: 2
- Official website: aebr.org.rw

The Association of Baptist Churches in Rwanda (French: Association des Églises baptistes au Rwanda is an association of Baptist Christian churches in Rwanda. It is affiliated with the Baptist World Alliance, with headquarters in Kigali.

== History ==
The Association has its origin in a mission of the Baptist Community of Congo in 1964, in Gisenyi, and was founded in 1967. According to a census published by the association in 2023, it claimed 276 churches and 58,960 members.

== Schools ==
The Association runs 42 primary and 20 secondary schools, and two affiliated theological institutes.

== Health services ==
The Association also runs three health centers.

== See also ==
- Religion in Rwanda
