= Jean Bosco Ntagungira =

Rwandan Catholic prelate

The Most Reverend Jean Bosco Ntagungira
- Bishop of Butare
- Church: Catholic Church
- Archdiocese: Roman Catholic Archdiocese of Kigali
- See: Butare
- Appointed: 12 August 2024
- Installed: 5 October 2024
- Predecessor: Philippe Rukamba

Orders
- Ordination: 1 August 1993
- Consecration: 5 October 2024 by Antoine Kambanda

Personal details
- Born: Jean Bosco Ntagungira; 3 April 1964 (age 61); Kigali, Archdiocese of Kigali, Rwanda
- Motto: “Audiant et Laetentur” (Let them hear and rejoice)

Jean Bosco Ntagungira (born 3 April 1964) is a Rwandan prelate of the Catholic Church who is the Bishop of the Roman Catholic Diocese of Butare. He was appointed bishop on 12 August 2024 by Pope Francis.

== Early life and education ==
He was born on 3 April 1964 in Kigali, Kigali Archdiocese, Rwanda. He attended Ndera Minor Seminary. He then transferred to Rutongo Preparatory Seminary. He studied both philosophy and Theology at Nyakibanda Major Seminary.

In 1994, he entered the Pontifical Lateran University, in Rome. He graduated from there in 2001, with a Doctor of Canon Law degree.

Bishop Ntagungira speaks Kinyarwanda, French, Italian, and English fluently, and he can write in Latin.

== Priest ==
He was ordained priest of Kigali Archdiocese on 1 August 1993.

He served in various roles while priest, including as:

- Prefect of studies at the Ndera Minor Seminary from 1993 until 1994
- Chancellor of the archdiocese of Kigali
- President of the diocesan Commission for Missions and Ecumenism from 2001 until 2002
- Rector of the Ndera Minor Seminary from 2002 until 2019
- Officer at the Interdiocesan Ecclesiastical Tribunal of Kigali since 2002
- Parish priest of Remera Parish in Kigali from 2019 until his appointment as bishop of Butare in 2024.

== Bishop ==
On 12 August 2024, the Holy Father accepted the resignation from the pastoral care of the diocese of Butare, Rwanda, presented by Bishop Philippe Rukamba. Pope Francis appointed the Reverend Jean Bosco Ntagungira, until then parish priest of Regina Pacis in Kigali, as bishop of Butare, Rwanda.

He was consecrated and installed on 5 October 2024, at the hands of Cardinal Antoine Kambanda, Archbishop of Kigali assisted by Bishop Philippe Rukamba, Bishop Emeritus of Butare and Bishop Célestin Hakizimana, Bishop of Gikongoro. Bishop Jean Bosco Ntagungira succeeded Bishop Emeritus Philipe Rukamba who retired.

== See also ==
- Catholic Church in Rwanda

== Succession table ==
Catholic Church titles
Preceded by Philippe Rukamba	Bishop of Butare; Since 12 August 2024	Succeeded by Incumbent
