= Jean Damascène Bimenyimana =

Rwandan Roman Catholic bishop (1953–2018)

- Bishop of Cyangugu
- Church: Catholic Church
- Diocese: Diocese of Cyangugu
- In office: 2 January 1997 – 11 March 2018
- Predecessor: Thaddée Ntihinyurwa
- Successor: Edouard Sinayobye

Orders
- Ordination: 6 July 1980
- Consecration: 16 March 1997 by Wenceslas Kalibushi

Personal details
- Born: 22 June 1953 Shangi, Kingdom of Rwanda, Ruanda-Urundi, Belgian Empire
- Died: 11 March 2018 (aged 64) Kanombe (west of Kabuga), Kigali, Rwanda

Jean Damascène Bimenyimana (22 June 1953 – 11 March 2018) was a Roman Catholic bishop.

Bimenyimana was ordained to the priesthood in 1980. He served as bishop of the Roman Catholic Diocese of Cyangugu, Rwanda, from 1997 until his death.
