= Fellowship of Christian Councils and Churches in the Great Lakes and Horn of Africa =

African ecumenical organisation

- Fraternité des Églises et des Conseils Chrétiens des Grands Lacs et de la Corne de l'Afrique
- Abbreviation: FECCLAHA
- Formation: 1999
- Type: Ecumenical organization
- Legal status: Non-governmental organization
- Headquarters: Nairobi, Kenya
- Region served: Great Lakes and Horn of Africa
- Members: Christian councils and churches
- Official language: English, French
- Affiliations: World Council of Churches
- Website: fecclaha.org

The Fellowship of Christian Councils and Churches in the Great Lakes and Horn of Africa (FECCLAHA, also Fraternité Des Eglises et Des Conseils Chrétiens Des Grands Lacs et De La Corne De L'Afrique) is an ecumenical Christian organization in Africa. It was founded in 1999 and is a member of the World Council of Churches.. FECCLAHA is a member of the World Council of Churches.

== Member Organizations ==
The FECCLAHA's has member organization which includes national councils and churches from several countries in the Great Lakes and Horn of Africa region:

- Christian Council of Tanzania
- Church of Christ in Congo
- Eritrean Orthodox Tewahedo Church
- Ethiopian Evangelical Church Mekane Yesus
- Evangelical Church of Eritrea
- National Council of Churches of Burundi
- National Council of Churches of Kenya
- New Sudan Council of Churches
- Protestant Council of Rwanda
- Sudan Council of Churches
- Uganda Joint Christian Council

== Activities ==
FECCLAHA is involved in various initiatives includinggovernance advocacy, gender justice, peacebuilding and youth empowerment. Programs have been implemented such as the Tamar Campaign to address gender-based violence and Youth Peace Clubs to promote nonviolent civic engagement.
