= List of groups named an association of churches =

Following are organizations that have in their name either "association of churches" or all of those words:

- American Association of Lutheran Churches
- Association of Baptist Churches of Chad
- Association of Baptist Churches in Ireland
- Association of Baptist Churches in Israel
- Association of Evangelical Churches in Burkina Faso
- Association of Evangelical Lutheran Churches
- Association of Vineyard Churches
- Mülheim Association of Free Churches and Evangelical Communities
- National Association of Congregational Christian Churches
- National Spiritualist Association of Churches
- New Wineskins Association of Churches
- Re-formed Association of Churches of Christ

== See also ==
- Association of churches
