= Uganda Joint Christian Council =

Christian ecumenical organization founded in Uganda in 1963

- Abbreviation: UJCC
- Founded: 1963
- Type: Ecumenical organization
- Purpose: Christian unity and cooperation
- Location: Uganda
- Fields: Ecumenism, peace building, education
- Members: Three main churches
- Parent organization: World Council of Churches

The Uganda Joint Christian Council (UJCC) is a pioneering ecumenical organization established in Uganda in 1963 to foster cooperation and unity among the country's major Christian denominations. The council represents a historic achievement in Christian unity, bringing together previously antagonistic Catholic and Protestant churches under a single umbrella organization. It is a member of the World Council of Churches and the Fellowship of Christian Councils and Churches in the Great Lakes and Horn of Africa.

== Formation and historical significance ==
The Uganda Joint Christian Council was formed in 1963 as what was described as "a pioneer venture in world ecumenical relations between Catholics and Protestants." This establishment was particularly significant given the historically strained relationships between Anglican and Roman Catholic churches in Uganda, which had been marked by serious conflicts since the religious wars of 1892.

The council's creation represented a remarkable transformation in inter-denominational relations and served as a model for ecumenical cooperation in other parts of Africa and beyond. The organization became a member of the World Council of Churches, reflecting its commitment to global Christian unity and cooperation.

== Membership and structure ==
The Uganda Joint Christian Council operates under specific membership criteria, requiring that "a church shall be eligible for membership on condition that it adheres to the authentic teaching of the Bible, the Apostles' Creed, and accepts baptism by water in the name of the Father and of the Son and of the Holy Spirit."

The council's membership includes three main churches: the Anglican Church of Uganda, the Roman Catholic Church in Uganda, and the Uganda Orthodox Church. This tripartite structure encompasses the vast majority of Uganda's Christian population and represents the country's major Christian traditions.

== Activities and contributions ==
The Uganda Joint Christian Council has been instrumental in promoting cooperation in various areas of Christian life and social development. The organization has facilitated joint Christian education syllabuses for schools, demonstrating its commitment to unified Christian education that transcends denominational boundaries. The council serves as a platform for its members to work toward greater mutual understanding and unity of purpose. It provides a forum to articulate and address issues of common concern, including peace building, social justice, and community development.

The UJCC has also been active in peace building initiatives, leveraging the moral authority and community influence of its member churches to promote reconciliation and social harmony. This work has been particularly important in Uganda's post-conflict reconstruction efforts and ongoing development challenges.
