= Diocese of Cyangugu =

Diocese of the Catholic Church in Rwanda

Coordinates: 2.486598°S 28.895148°E

Diocese of Cyangugu Dioecesis Cyanguguensis

Location
- Country: Rwanda
- Metropolitan: Kigali

Statistics
- Area: 1.125 km^{2} (0.434 sq mi)
- Population: Total; Catholics: (as of 2008); 626,621; 283,372 (45.22%)

Information
- Rite: Latin Rite

Current leadership
- Pope: Leo XIV
- Bishop: Edouard Sinayobye

Map
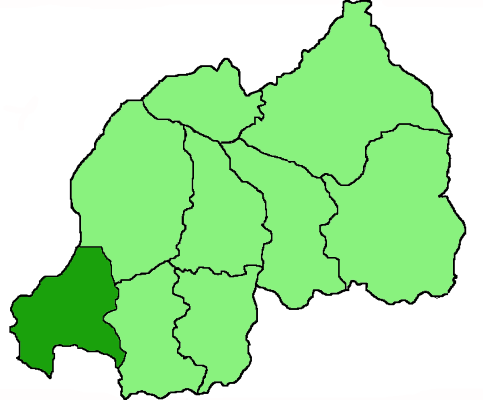

The Roman Catholic Diocese of Cyangugu (Latin: Cyanguguen(sis)) is a diocese located in the city of Cyangugu in the ecclesiastical province of Kigali in Rwanda. Since 2021, the Catholic Diocese of Cyangugu is entrusted to Bishop Edouard Sinayobye.

The Diocese of Cyangugu (in French Diocèse Catholique de Cyangugu) was established by Pope John Paul II on November 14, 1981. It was entrusted to Bishop Thaddeus Ntihinyurwa on January 24, 1982, as diocesan bishop until his appointment as Archbishop of Kigali on March 9, 1996, and as Apostolic Administrator of Cyangugu until January 2, 1997, when the pope appointed his successor, Bishop Jean Damascène Bimenyimana, who served as Bishop of the Diocese of Cyangugu until he died on March 11, 2018.

== Leadership ==
Bishops of Cyangugu

- Thaddée Ntihinyurwa (1981.11.05 – 1996.03.09), appointed Archbishop of Kigali but soon became Apostolic Administrator here
  - Archbishop Thaddée Ntihinyurwa (Apostolic Administrator 1996.03.25 – 1997.01.02)
- Jean Damascène Bimenyimana (1997.01.02 - 2018.03.11)
- Edouard Sinayobye (2021.02.06 - ...)

== Parishes ==
- Shangi
- Nkanka
- Mibilizi
- Mwezi
- Muyange
- Nyamasheke
- Yove
- Cyangugu
- Nyabitimbo
- Hanika
- Tyazo
- Mashyuza
- Mushaka
- nyakabuye

== See also ==
- Roman Catholicism in Rwanda
