= National Council of Churches of Burundi =

Christian organization in Burundi

The National Council of Churches of Burundi (French: Conseil national des Eglises du Burundi, known as CNEB) is a federation of Protestant Churches in Burundi. It traces its lineage to the Alliance of Protestant Missions in Ruanda-Urundi (Alliance des Missions Protestantes du Ruanda-Urundi) established in 1935 which became the Protestant Alliance of Burundi (Alliance Protestante du Burundi) on independence.

It received its current name in 1989. It is a member of the World Council of Churches, the Act Alliance and the Fellowship of Christian Councils and Churches in the Great Lakes and Horn of Africa.
