= Phocas Nikwigize =

- Bishop of Diocese of Ruhenger (emeritus)
- Church: Roman Catholic Church
- See: Diocese of Ruhengeri
- In office: 1968 - 1996
- Predecessor: Joseph Sibomana
- Successor: Kizito Bahujimihigo
- Previous post(s): Priest

Orders
- Ordination: 25 July 1948
- Consecration: 30 November 1968 by Amelio Poggi

Personal details
- Born: 23 August 1919; Muhango, Rwanda
- Died: 30 November 1996 (aged 77)

Phocas Nikwigize (23 August 1919 – 30 November 1996) was a Rwandan bishop in the Roman Catholic Church.

Nikwigize born in Muhango, Rwanda, and was ordained a priest on 25 July 1948. He was appointed bishop of the Diocese of Ruhengeri and ordained bishop on 30 November 1968. Nikiwigize remained in this post until his retirement on 5 January 1996.

On 27 November 1996, he was traveling to re-enter Rwanda with missionaries when he was seized by members of a Rwandan Patriotic Army and was believed to be killed on 30 November 1996.

== See also ==
- Diocese of Ruhengeri
