= Religion in Rwanda =

Religion in Rwanda (2022 census)
1. Catholicism (40%)
2. Pentecostalism (21%)
3. Other Protestants (15%)
4. Seventh-day Adventist (12%)
5. Other Christians (4%)
6. No religion (3%)
7. Islam (2%)
8. Other religions (3%)

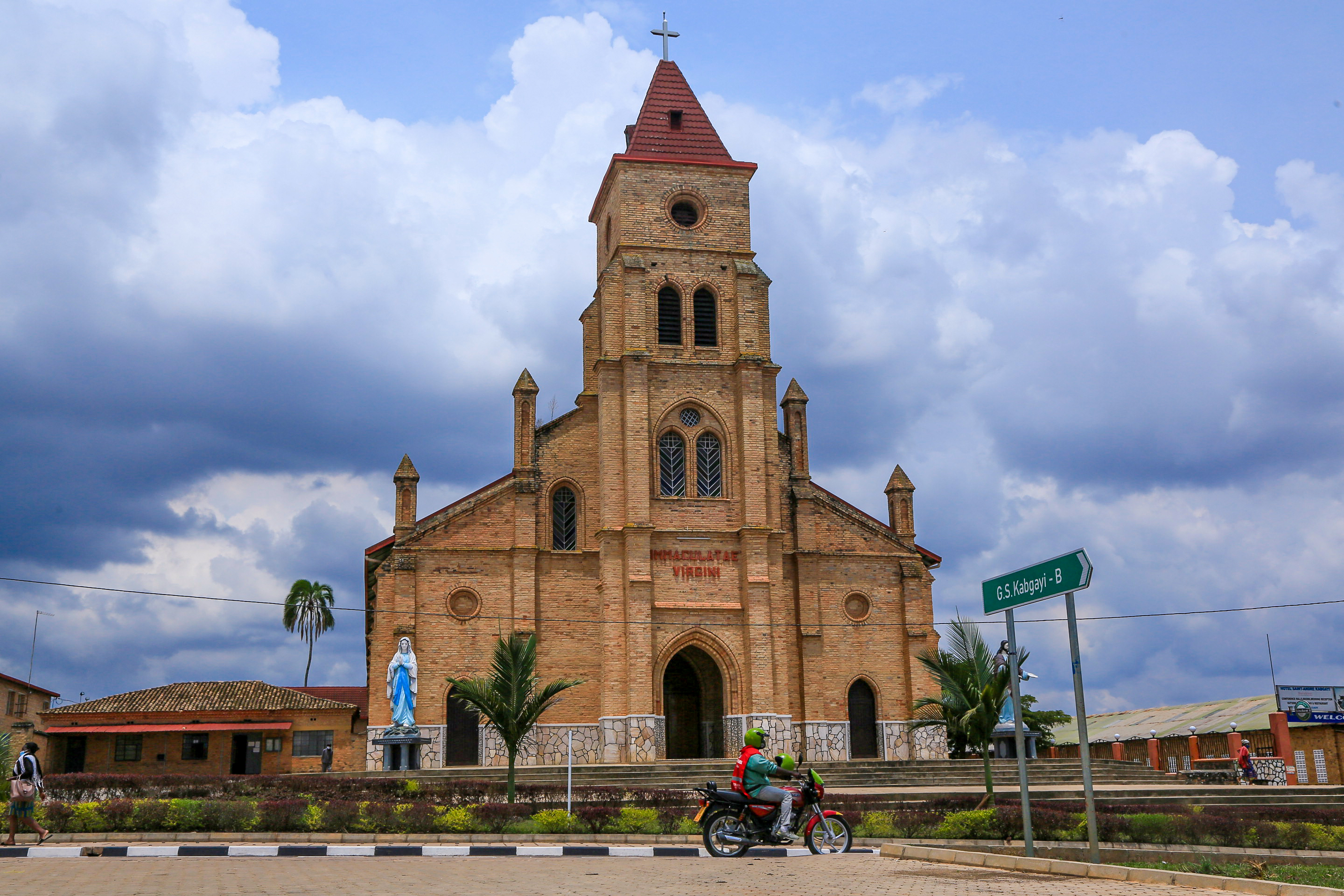
The Cathedral Basilica of Our Lady in Kabgayi, Rwanda.

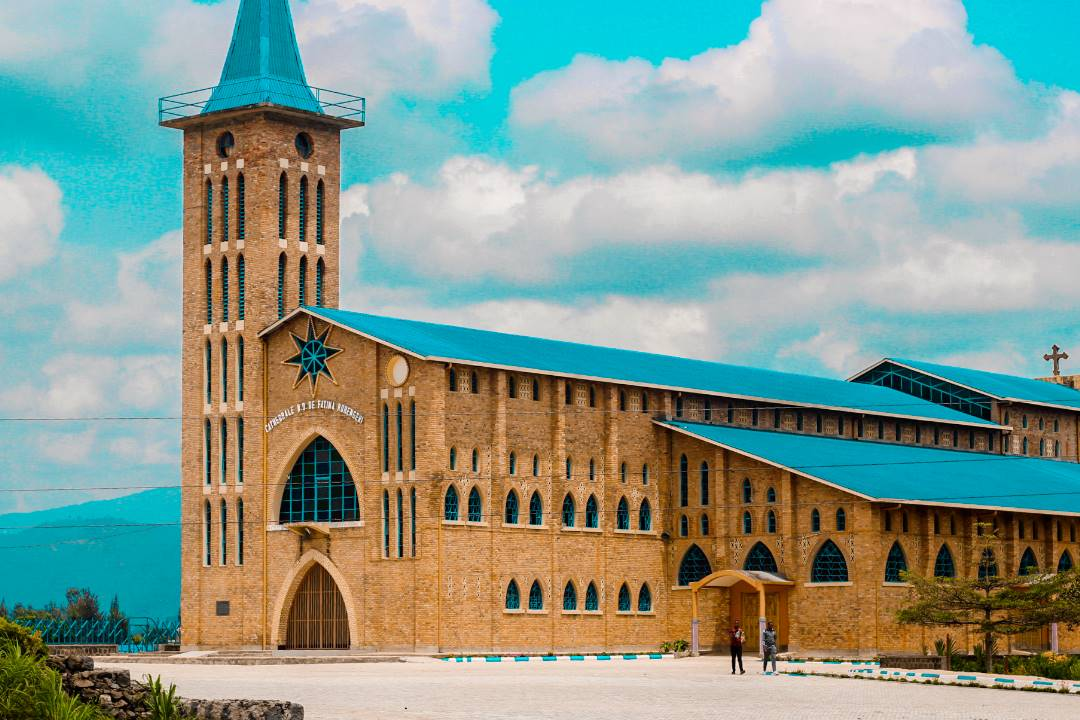
The Cathedral of Fatima Ruhengeri.

Christianity is the largest religion in Rwanda, with Protestantism and Catholicism being its main denominations. Around 3% of the population claims no religious affiliation, while another 3% practices other religions including traditional faiths. Approximately 2% of the populace is Muslim (mainly Sunni).

There is also a small population of Baha'is, as well as some practising traditional indigenous beliefs. There has been a proliferation of small, usually Christian-linked schismatic religious groups since the 1994 genocide.

There are small communities of Hindus and Buddhists, comprising mostly foreign adherents, typically businessmen from China and India as well as university professors and students. Neither religion seriously attempts conversion in Rwanda; although, there is a Hindu Temple of Rwanda as a place of worship.

== Current context ==
The Constitution of Rwanda provides for freedom of religion, and the Government generally respects this right in practice.

Foreign missionaries are allowed to operate in the country, but must register for a residency permit.

In 2023, the country was scored 2 out of 4 for religious freedom; it was noted that government policies are getting stricter.

== Demographics ==
=== Census ===
The national census from 2012, the Fourt Rwanda Population and Housing Census, indicated that: 43.7% of Rwanda's population was Catholic, 37.7% was Protestant, 11.8% was Seventh-day Adventist, 2.0% was Muslim, 2.5% claimed no religious affiliation, and 0.7% was Jehovah's Witness. The remainder had another religion or did not state one.

Religion	2022 census	
Religion	#	%
Christianity	6,874,687	92.81
—Catholicism	5,286,003	39.91
—Protestantism	4,749,554	35.86
—Seventh-day Adventist	1,612,482	12.17
—Jehovah's Witnesses	93,131	0.70
—Other Christianity	553,174	4.18
Islam	265,317	2.00
Traditional faiths	2,112	0.02
Other religion	264,319	2.00
No religion	402,517	3.04
Not stated	17,785	0.13
Total	13,246,394	100

== World religions ==
=== Christianity ===
==== Catholicism ====
There are just over five million Catholics in Rwanda - about half of the total population. The country is divided into nine dioceses including one archdiocese.

==== Protestant ====
The Presbyterian Church in Rwanda was founded in 1907. In 2006, it claimed 300 000 members, 100 parishes, 81 pastors and 56 evangelists.

The Protestant Council of Rwanda was founded in Rwanda in 1935.

The Association of Baptist Churches in Rwanda was founded in 1967. According to a census published by the association in 2023, it claimed 276 churches and 58,960 members.

==== Latter-day Saints ====
The Church of Jesus Christ of Latter-day Saints in Rwanda
- Area: Africa Central
- Members: 3,625 (2025)
- Districts: 1
- Branches: 10
- Missions: 1

Few members of The Church of Jesus Christ of Latter-day Saints (LDS Church) lived in Rwanda in the 1980's and 1990's. The LDS Church began holding regular worship services in Rwanda in the early 2000s. The first branch in Rwanda was organized in the summer of 2008. Church Apostle Jeffery R. Holland visited the country in 2009 to dedicated the country in hopes to expand the LDS Church within the country and in 2010 a humanitarian missionary couple was sent there. The church gained official legal recognition from the Rwandan government in October 2013.

In July 2022, the LDS Church created the Rwanda Kigali Mission from a split among several nearby missions. The Mission covers all of Rwanda and Burundi as well as parts of eastern Democratic Republic of the Congo. The LDS Church provided several humanitarian aid services for Rwanda including providing wheelchairs and training.

In 2008 there were 12 LDS Church members in the country. In 2019 there was 755, which grew to 3,625 members at the end of 2025. As of February 2026, there were ten branches in Rwanda, nine in the Kigali Rwanda area and one that covers dispersed members not in proximity of a meetinghouse. Rwanda is part of the Nairobi Kenya Temple district. The Kampala Uganda Temple was announced to be constructed on October 6 2024.

=== Islam ===
Islam was bolstered by Muslim merchants from the Indian subcontinent, who married local Rwandans. Rwandans built their first mosque in 1913. This mosque is known as Al-Fatah Mosque.

== History ==
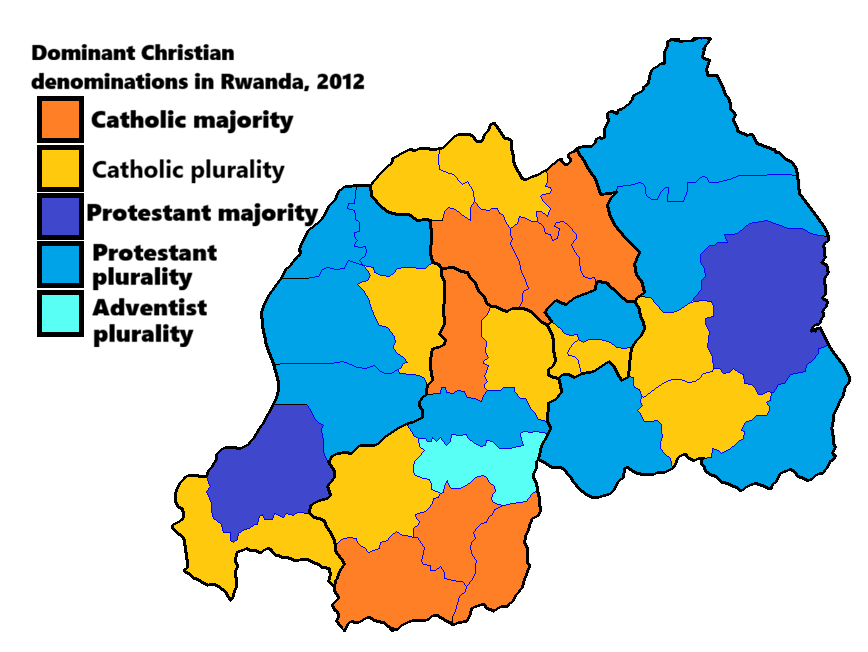
Largest Christian denomination by district in Rwanda in 2012

=== Colonial period ===
Although the ethnic divisions and tensions between Hutu and Tutsi predate the colonial era, the Organization of African Unity (OAU) report on the genocide states,

In the colonial era, under German and then Belgian rule, Roman Catholic missionaries, inspired by the overtly racist theories of 19th century Europe, concocted a destructive ideology of ethnic cleavage and racial ranking that attributed superior qualities to the country's Tutsi minority, since the missionaries ran the colonial-era schools, these pernicious values were systematically transmitted to several generations of Rwandans…

When the Roman Catholic missionaries came to Rwanda in the late 1880s, they contributed to the "Hamitic" theory of race origins, which taught that the Tutsi were a superior race. The Church has been considered to have played a significant role in fomenting racial divisions between Hutu and Tutsi, in part because they found more willing converts among the majority Hutu.

=== Role of religion in 1994 genocide ===
An estimated 1,000,000 Rwandans died during ethnic violence over a brief span of 100 days between April and July 1994. Most of the dead were Tutsis and most of those who perpetrated the violence were Hutus.

The genocide started after the death of the Rwandan President Juvénal Habyarimana, a Hutu, in the shooting down of his plane above Kigali airport on 6 April 1994. The full details of that specific incident remain unclear but the death of the President was by no means the only cause of the mayhem (ethnic tension in Rwanda is not new and disagreements between the majority Hutus and minority Tutsis are common but the animosity between them grew substantially after the end of the Belgian colonial regime).

Timothy Longman has provided the most detailed discussion of the role of religion in the Rwandan genocide in Christianity and Genocide in Rwanda, published in 2010. Longman argues that both Catholic and Protestant churches helped to make the genocide possible by giving moral sanction to the killing. Churches had long played ethnic politics themselves, favoring the Tutsi during the colonial period then switching allegiance to the Hutu after 1959, sending a message that some may have interpreted as ethnic discrimination being consistent with church teaching. The church leaders had close ties with the political leaders, and after the genocide began, the church leaders called on the population to support the new interim government, the very government supporting the genocide.

Some church leaders actively participated in the genocide. For example, Athanase Seromba, a Catholic priest responsible at the time of the genocide for the Nyange parish, was ultimately (after appeal) convicted in 2008 by the Appeals Chamber for the International Criminal Tribunal for Rwanda of committing genocide and crimes against humanity. Specifically, it was shown that Seromba abused his high degree of trust in the community as a Catholic priest, when, instead of protecting the 1500-2000 Tutsi refugees sheltering in his church, he provided key and necessary approval for the church to be bulldozed to the ground with the intent to kill the refugees inside.

At the same time, churches did not uniformly support the genocide. In the period leading up to the genocide, 1990–1994, major splits emerged within most churches between moderates who promoted democratic change and conservatives allied with the Habyarimana regime. Many of the clergy were Tutsi, and they generally supported democratic reform, but many moderate Hutu within the churches supported reform as well. Churches provided major support to the formation of the new human-rights groups that emerged in the early 1990s. When the genocide began in 1994, some clergy and other church leaders opposed the violence, even at the risk of their own lives.

Some individual members of the religious community attempted to protect civilians, sometimes at great risk to themselves. For example, Monsignor Thaddée Ntihinyurwa of Cyangugu preached against the genocide from the pulpit and tried unsuccessfully to rescue three Tutsi religious brothers from an attack, while Sr. Felicitas Niyitegeka of the Auxiliaires de l'Apostolat in Gisenyi smuggled Tutsi across the border into Zaire before a militant militia executed her in retaliation.

In her book Left to Tell: Discovering God in the Rwandan Holocaust (2006), Immaculée Ilibagiza, a Tutsi woman, describes hiding with seven other Tutsi women for 91 days in a bathroom in the house of Pastor Murinzi - for the majority of the genocide. At the St Paul Pastoral Centre in Kigali about 2,000 people found refuge and most of them survived, due to the efforts of Fr Célestin Hakizimana. This priest "intervened at every attempt by the militia to abduct or murder" the refugees in his centre. In the face of powerful opposition, he tried to hold off the killers with persuasion or bribes.

On November 20, 2016, the Catholic Church in Rwanda released a statement signed by nine bishops apologizing for the role of its members in the genocide of 1994.

== See also ==
- Catholic Church in Rwanda
- Islam in Rwanda
- Protestant Council of Rwanda
