= Islam in Rwanda =

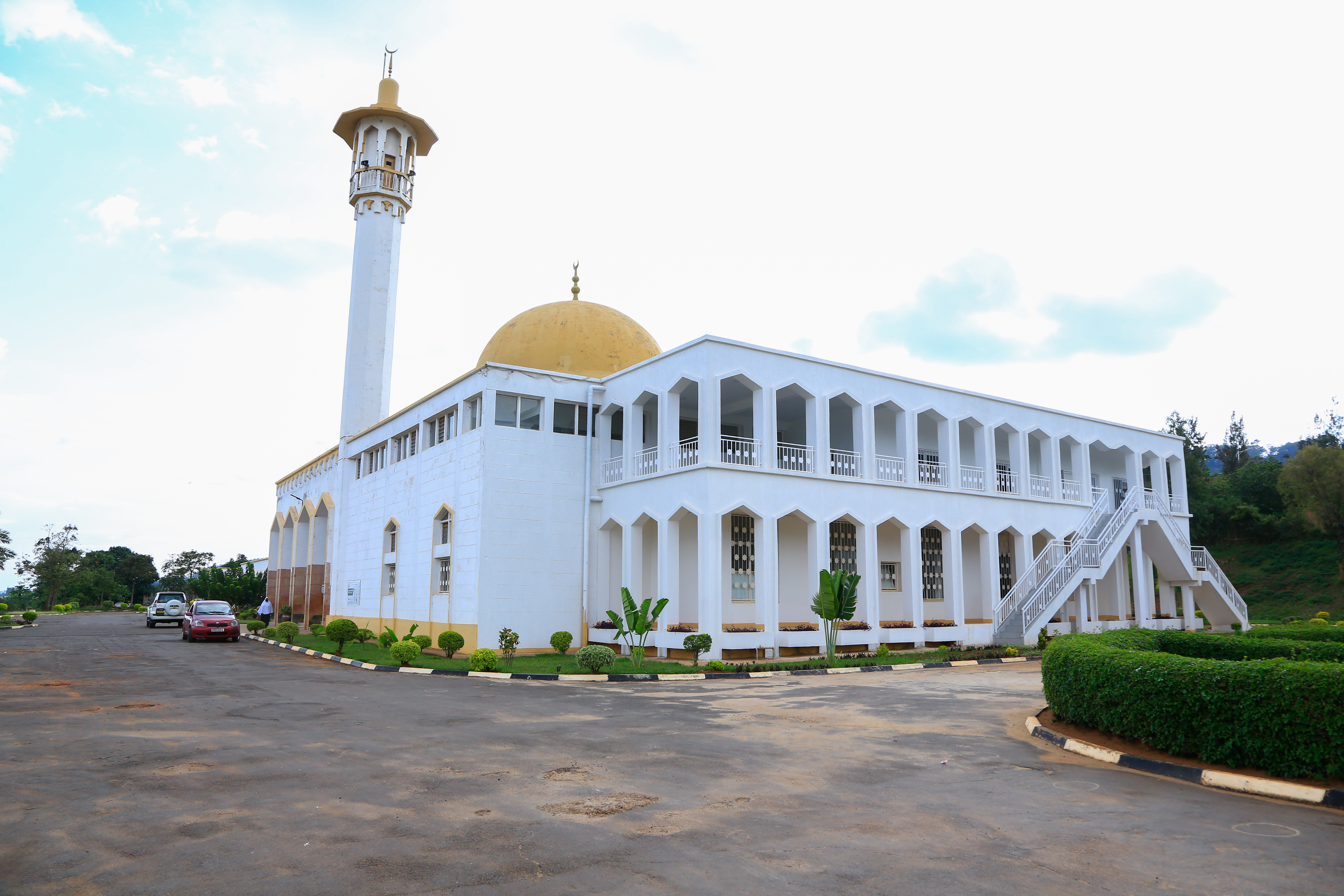
Mosque kadafi

Islam is a minority religion in Rwanda, practiced by 2% of the total population according to the 2022 census. Islam was first introduced into Rwanda by Muslim traders from the East Coast of Africa in the 20th century. Since its introduction, Muslims have been a minority in the territory, while Christianity was introduced to Rwandans during the colonial period in the beginning of the 20th century and is now the largest religion in the country.

Muslims in Rwanda have only been accorded the same rights and freedoms as Christians since 2003, with the signing of the Rwanda Constitution, protecting freedom of religion and prohibiting religious discrimination. Estimates show that there are equal numbers of Muslims among the Hutus as there are among the Tutsis. The estimates cannot be verified in the wake of the genocide, as the government has since banned all discussion of ethnicity in Rwanda. Following the Rwandan genocide, conversions to Islam grew due to dissatisfaction with some church officials' participation in the genocide.

== History ==
=== Colonial history ===
Compared to East African countries such as Tanzania, Kenya, and Uganda, the history of Islam in Rwanda is relatively modern. While a few written sources are available regarding its origins, it is claimed that Islam came through Arab traders from Zanzibar who first entered the country in 1901. Alternatively, it has been argued that Islam arrived during the colonial period when Muslim clerks, administrative assistants, and merchants from the Swahili-speaking coast of Tanganyika were brought to the country. Islam was also bolstered by Muslim merchants from the Indian subcontinent, who married local Rwandans. Rwandans built their first mosque in 1913. This mosque is known as Al-Fatah Mosque.

During its history, many efforts were made to impede the spread of Islam in Rwanda. These efforts generally exploited anti-Arab sentiment, and presented Muslims as foreigners. Catholic missionaries often went to great lengths to counter what they perceived influence of rival religions, such as Islam and Protestantism.

Muslims were further marginalized by the fact that most Muslims settled in urban areas, whereas 90 percent of the population was rural. As neither Arab nor Indian merchants ever attempted to further their faith, there was little spirit of preaching among Muslims. Only a few conversions took place, mostly among the marginalized urban population: women who had married foreigners, illegitimate children and orphans. Even these conversion were sometimes superficial, motivated by desire for social and economic security that Muslims provided, than for religious conviction in the Islamic faith.

Under the Belgian administration, Muslims in Rwanda were to some extent marginalized. Since Muslims had no place in the Catholic Church, which maintained great influence over the state, Muslims were often excluded from education and important jobs in the government. As a result, Muslim employment was largely confined to engaging in petty trade, and taking up jobs as drivers.

=== After independence ===
In 1960, the former government minister Isidore Sebazungu ordered the burning of the Muslim quarter and the mosque in Rwamagana. Following this event, Muslims were terrified and many of them fled to neighbouring countries. It is alleged that the Catholic Church was involved in these events, which aggravated the bitterness between Muslims and Christians.

Before the Rwandan genocide of 1994, Muslims were held in low regard, because they were seen as traders, in a land where farmers are highly regarded. The Muslim population before the genocide was 4%, which was unusually low compared to that of neighbouring countries. Muslims were also affected by the genocide. There were only a few incidents in which Tutsis in mosques were attacked. The most widely known example occurred at Nyamirambo Main Mosque, where hundreds of Tutsi had gathered to take refuge. The refugees in the mosque fought off Hutu militias with stones, bows and arrows, putting up stiff resistance against the soldiers and militia of the Interahamwe. Only once the soldiers attacked with machine gun fire were the Interahamwe able to enter the mosque and kill the refugees.

== Post-1994 conversions ==
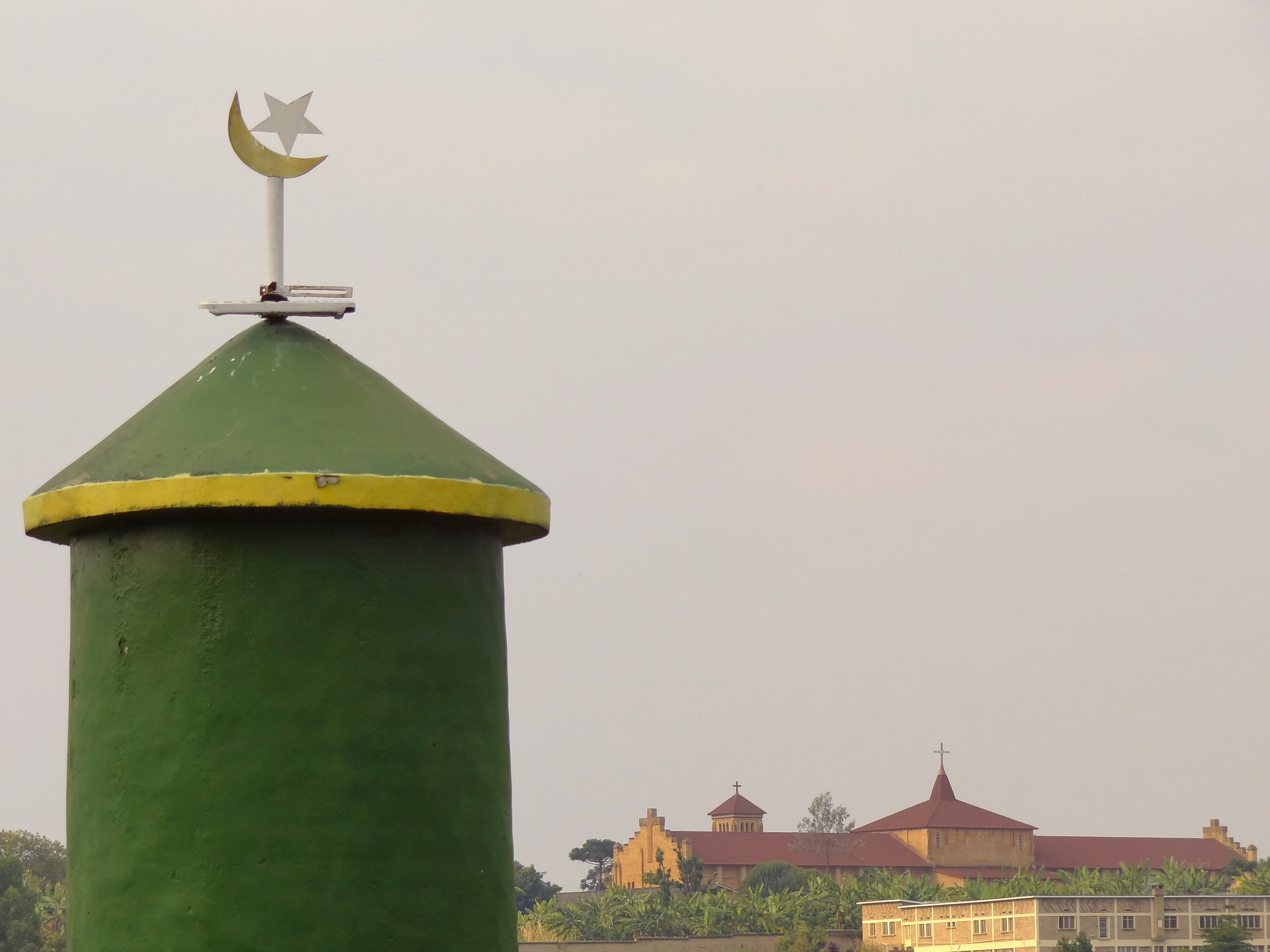
Minaret of the Al-Masidjid Q'ubah mosque at Butare, Rwanda

The number of Rwandan Muslims increased after the 1994 genocide due to large numbers of conversions. Many Muslims had sheltered refugees, both Hutu and Tutsi. Some converts state that they converted to Islam because of the role that some Catholic and Protestant leaders played in the genocide. Human-rights groups have documented both incidents in which Christian clerics permitted Tutsis to seek refuge in churches, then surrendered them to Hutu death-squads, as well as instances of Hutu priests and ministers encouraging their congregations to kill Tutsis. Nevertheless, a few Muslims played a crucial role in the Rwandan genocide: Hassan Ngeze, a leading Hutu Power intellectual best known for writing the Hutu Ten Commandments, was born to a Muslim family. However, Negeze's religious background had no connection to his anti-Tutsi views, which was based on Hutu supremacism.

In regards to the role Muslims played during the genocide, journalist Philip Gourevitch reported that one Christian leader stated "[The Muslims] apparently behaved quite well, and as a group was not active in the genocide, even seeking to save Tutsi Muslims."

Personal accounts relate how some Tutsi converted for safety, as they feared continuing reprisal killings by Hutu extremists, and knew that Muslims would protect them from such acts. Many Hutu converted as well, in search for "purification". Many Hutu want to leave their violent past behind them and to not have "blood on their hands". There are also a few isolated instances where Hutu have converted in the hope that they could hide within the Muslim community and thereby escape arrest.

The rate of conversions slowed after 1997. According to the mufti of Rwanda, the Islamic community has not seen any increases in conversions in 2002/2003. Christianity remains as the country's leading religion. Catholicism (which arrived in the beginning of the 20th century with the White Fathers order of the Roman Catholic Church) remains deeply embedded in the culture.

== Activities ==
Muslims in Rwanda are also actively involved in social activities, such as their jihad to "start respecting each other". Many Rwandan Muslims are engaged in efforts to heal ethnic tensions after the genocide and Islamic groups are reaching out to the disadvantaged, for example by forming women's groups that provide education on child care. Western governments have worried over the growing influence of Islam, and some government officials have express concern that some of the mosques receive funding from Saudi Arabia. However, there is little evidence of militancy.

The Muslim religious holiday Eid al-Fitr is observed by the government as one of the four religious official holiday (alongside Christmas, All Saints' Day, and Assumption). Muslims also operate private Islamic schools. In 2003, the US Embassy oversaw the renovations of an Islamic secondary school in Kigali. Embassy leaders also met with Muslim leaders, alongside members of Catholic and Anglican Churches, Seventh-day Adventists, and Jehovah's Witnesses, to hold interfaith talks.

Rwanda used to have a religious political party, the Democratic Islamic Party (PDI), with non-Muslim members. However, it changed its name to Ideal Democratic Party, after the constitution mandated no party may be formed on the basis of religion.

== Population ==
There is a considerable range in the estimates of the Muslim population of Rwanda. No accurate census of the Muslim population has been done.

Source	Population (000s)	Population (%)	Year	Ref
The Washington Post	1,148	14	2002	
The Washington Post		7	1993 "before killings began"	
CIA World factbook	456	4.6	2001	
The New York Times		15	2004	
Worldmark Encyclopedia of Culture & Daily Life	350	5	1998	
US Dept. of State (UN Population Fund survey)		1.1	1996	
US Dept. of State (university study)		4.6	2001	
National Census 2012		2,0	2012	

According to the 2012 census, Roman Catholic Christians represented 43.7% of the population, Protestants (excluding Seventh-day Adventists) 37.7%, Seventh-day Adventists 11.8%, and Muslims 2.0%; 0.2% claimed no religious beliefs and 1.3% did not state a religion. Traditional religion, despite officially being followed by only 0.1% of the population, retains an influence. Many Rwandans view the Christian God as synonymous with the traditional Rwandan God Imana.

== See also ==
- Religion in Rwanda
  - Roman Catholicism in Rwanda
