= Association of churches =

An association of churches is primarily a term used in U.S. tax law to describe a cooperative endeavor among churches that is entitled to tax status similar or identical to the tax status of the churches themselves.

Under U.S. law, an association of churches is usually exempt from taxes. It is normally treated as a public charitable organization for tax purposes, as distinguished from being treated less favorably as a private foundation.

In 1974, the Internal Revenue Service (IRS) stated that, "Neither the Code nor the regulations thereunder define what constitutes a convention or association of churches." Thus, the meaning of the term has not always been crystal clear. While initially defined as a "cooperative undertaking by churches of the same denomination", the definition has been expanded by the IRS to include churches of different denominations.

In parts of the United States Code, the word "church" is defined so as to include not just a church in the ordinary narrow sense of the word, but additionally such things as an "association of churches". Like any church, an association of churches must satisfy specific requirements in order to become and remain tax exempt. For example, an association of churches may have to pay an Unrelated Business Income Tax (UBIT) if it gets income by using its property for non-exempt purposes.

The phrase "association of churches" is used in several federal statutes, as well as in court opinions that interpret federal statutes. For instance, in St. Martin Evangelical Lutheran Church v. South Dakota (1981), the United States Supreme Court decided (among other things) that the Northwestern Lutheran Academy of the Wisconsin Evangelical Lutheran Synod was run by a "convention or association of churches" and was therefore exempt from unemployment compensation taxes under the applicable statute.

== See also ==
- Evangelical Council for Financial Accountability (ECFA)
- Free Exercise Clause of the U.S. Constitution
- List of groups named an association of churches
