= Wenceslas Kalibushi =

Rwandan Catholic bishop (1919–1997)

Mgr. Wenceslas Kalibushi
- Bishop Emeritus of Nyundo, Rwanda
- Wenceslas Kalibushi (front) and Aloys Bigirumwami in Uden, Netherlands in 1968
- Installed: 2 January 1997
- Term ended: 20 December 1997
- Other posts: Bishop of Nyundo, Rwanda (1977-1997)

Orders
- Ordination: 25 July 1947
- Consecration: 27 March 1977 by Archbishop Vincent Nsengiyumva

Personal details
- Born: 29 June 1919 Byimana, Rwanda
- Died: 20 December 1997 (aged 78)

Wenceslas Kalibushi (29 June 1919 – 20 December 1997) was a Rwandan Catholic bishop.

Wenceslas Kalibushi was born on 29 June 1919 at Byimana, Rwanda. He was ordained a priest on 25 July 1947. On 9 December 1976 he was appointed bishop of the Roman Catholic Diocese of Nyundo, and he was consecrated by Archbishop Vincent Nsengiyumva on 27 March 1977. His principal co-consecrators were Archbishop André Perraudin and Bishop Aloys Bigirumwami.

Kalibushi was one of the few priests to speak out against government actions during the lead-up to the Rwandan genocide. On 28 December 1993 he and the priests of Kibuye and Gisenyi issued a letter that criticized the government for issuing arms to civilians. His letter asked the authorities to "clearly explain to the public the utility of the arms that had been distributed during recent days." Perhaps because of Kalibushi's willingness to support Tutsis and his criticism of the government, his compound at Nyundo was one of the first targets of the Hutu extremists.

The morning after the death of President Juvénal Habyarimana, on 7 April 1994 a number of Tutsi families came to Nyundo for safety. A large, hostile and armed crowd arrived, and the killing began, including women and children who took refuge in the chapel. On the morning of 8 April the militia captured the bishop, stripped him and threatened to kill him, but were stopped by an army officer. Bishop Kalibushi was taken to Gisenyi and was later released at the request of the Vatican. On 3 May Mgr. Vincent Nsengiyumva wrote a letter to the Christians of Nyundo reassuring them that Kalibushi was safe and sound, and that rumors that he had fled to Nairobi were false.

Kalibushi retired on 2 January 1997 and died on 20 December 1997.
