= Aloys Bigirumwami =

Rwandan Roman Catholic prelate

Mgr. Aloys Bigirumwami
- Bishop of Nyundo
- Appointed: 14 February 1952
- Term ended: 17 December 1973
- Successor: Vincent Nsengiyumva

Orders
- Ordination: 26 May 1929
- Consecration: 1 June 1952 by Laurent-François Déprimoz

Personal details
- Born: 22 December 1904 Zaza, Rwanda
- Died: 3 June 1986 (aged 81)

Aloys Bigirumwami (December 22, 1904 – June 3, 1986) was a Rwandan prelate of the Roman Catholic Church. He served as Bishop of Nyundo from 1959 to 1973, having previously served as its apostolic vicar.

== Birth and education ==
Aloys Bigirumwami was born into a Tutsi family on 22 December 1904 in Zaza, Rwanda, and baptized on Christmas Day. He came from the Bagesera-Bazirankende clan, which had ruled Gisaka, a state that around 1850 had been conquered and annexed to Rwanda. His father, Joseph Rukamba, was one of the first Christians of the Catholic mission that had been founded at Zaza in 1900, baptized on Christmas 1903. Aloys was the eldest of a family of six boys and six girls.

At the age of ten Aloys entered Saint Léon Minor Seminary of Kabgayi. He entered the Major Seminary of Kabgayi in 1921, where he studied under Bishop John Joseph Hirth, founder of the church of Rwanda. He was ordained a priest on 26 May 1929.

== Career ==
Bishop Aloysius Bigirumwami of Nyundo

Bigirumwami taught at the Saint Léon Minor Seminary of Kabgayi in 1929. He was then in turn vicar of the parishes of Kabgayi (1930), Murunda (1930), Kigali Sainte Famille (1931) and Rulindo (1932). On 30 January 1933 he was appointed pastor of Muramba, holding this post until 17 January 1951. In 1947 he was the first Rwandan priest to be named to the council of the vicariate. In 1951 he was made pastor of Nyundo.

On 14 February 1952 Pope Pius XII appointed Bigirumwami the first vicar apostolic of Nyundo, and titular Bishop of Garriana. He was ordained bishop at Kabgayi during the feast of Pentecost, on 1 June 1952, in a ceremony attended by many church and civil leaders and by a huge crowd of Christians. King Mutara Rudahigwa of Rwanda was also present and spoke at the occasion. After his consecration, Nyundo received 20,000 converts.

Bigirumwami rejected the existence of a conflict between Hutus and Tutsis. The bishop also believed that the conversion of the pagans within his jurisdiction could be achieved with a large number of priests. He once stated, "With enough priests to station one every ten kilometers, it would not take too long." Bigirumwami also ignored witchcraft in regards of medicine, but attacked it in the spheres of prophecy and sympathetic magic.

Bigirumwami arranged for schools and hospitals to be built, and helped girls to obtain education. In 1956 he ordained André Perraudin, who was later named archbishop of the Rwandan church. Bigirumwami was raised to the rank of bishop upon his vicariate's elevation to a diocese on November 10, 1959. The new diocese of Nyundo combined the old prefectures of Gisenyi, Kibuye and part of Ruhengeri. 54,000 were Christians out of a total population of 375,000. On 10 November 1959 Bigirumwami was appointed Bishop of Nyundo, Rwanda, holding that position until he retired after twenty-one years of service, five days before his sixty-ninth birthday, on 17 December 1973.

Bigirumwami was first African bishop to be appointed in the Belgian colonies (Rwanda, Burundi and Congo). He was also seen as a likely candidate to become a cardinal.

Aloys Bigirumwami died on 3 June 1986 in the hospital in Ruhengeri from a heart attack. He was aged 81. He was buried in the Cathedral of Nyundo.

Styles of Aloysius Bigirumwami
- Reference style: The Most Reverend
- Spoken style: Your Excellency
- Religious style: Monsignor
- Posthumous style: none

== Works ==
Bigirumwami had little exposure to Rwandan culture as a child, and when he first became interested in his ancestral customs it was as a missionary would take an interest in pagan practices he was determined to destroy. However, he gradually came to appreciate the values incorporated in traditional beliefs, and came to think that the church should not destroy local cultures, but should use them as a vehicle for its message. In December 1954 he founded the magazine Hobe for youth. Hobe, written entirely in Kinyarwanda, was a great success. It was part of a deliberate effort to rehabilitate the Rwandan culture in an age where it was common to dismiss the culture as inferior to Western civilization. Bigirumwami wrote many books on the Rwandan culture. He was a strong believer in unity among the Rwandan people, and criticized foreign publications that exaggerated the differences between the different groups.

=== Bibliography ===
- Bigirumwami, Aloys (1967). Imigani migufi, inshamarenga, ibisakuzo: Proverbes, dictons, devinettes. République rwandaise.
- Bigirumwami, Aloys (1971). Présentation et commentaire des cinq volumes écrits par Mgr. Bigirumwami.
- Bigirumwami, Aloys (1971). Imigani miremire. s.l.
- Bigirumwami, Aloys (1972). Ibitekerezo, ... amahamba n'amzina y'inkae ibiganiro. [Diocèse de] Nyundo.
- Bigirumwami, Aloys (1979). Imana y'abantu, abantu b'Imana, Imana mu bantu abantu mu mana.
- Bigirumwami, Aloys (1984). Imihigo, imiziro n'imiziririzo mu Rwanda: Proverbs, essays and poems about Rwanda.
- Bigirumwami, Aloys; Muzungu, Bernardin (1987). Contes moraux du Rwanda. Editions de l'Université Nationale du Rwanda.
- Bigirumwami, Aloys; Crépeau, Pierre (2000). Paroles du soir: contes du Rwanda. Editions David. ISBN 978-2-922109-33-7.
- Bigirumwami, Aloys; Crépeau, Pierre (2005). Cent Contes Du Rwanda. Fondation littéraire Fleur de lys. ISBN 978-2-89612-142-7.

Catholic Church titles
Preceded by none	Bishop of Nyundo; 1959–1973	Succeeded by Vincent Nsengiyumva
