= Vincent Nsengiyumva =

Archbishop of Kigali (1936–1994)

The Most Reverend Vincent Nsengiyumva
- Kigali
- Diocese: Archdiocese of Kigali
- Installed: April 10, 1976
- Term ended: June 7, 1994 (his death)
- Predecessor: None
- Successor: Thaddée Ntihinyurwa

Orders
- Ordination: June 18, 1966
- Consecration: June 2, 1974

Personal details
- Born: February 10, 1936 Rwaza, Ruanda-Urundi
- Died: June 7, 1994 (aged 58) Kabgayi, Rwanda
- Denomination: Roman Catholic

Styles of Vincent Nsengiyumva
- Reference style: The Most Reverend
- Spoken style: Your Excellency
- Religious style: Monsignor
- Posthumous style: none

Vincent Nsengiyumva (February 10, 1936 – June 7, 1994) was a Rwandan prelate of the Roman Catholic Church who served as Archbishop of Kigali from 1976 until his death.

Born in Rwaza, he was ordained to the priesthood on June 18, 1966.

On December 17, 1973, Nsengiyumva was appointed Bishop of Nyundo by Pope Paul VI, replacing Aloys Bigirumwami, who had resigned. He received his episcopal consecration on June 2, 1974, from Cardinal Laurean Rugambwa, with Bishop Aloys Bigirumwami and Archbishop André Perraudin, MAfr, serving as co-consecrators. He was later named the first Archbishop of Kigali on April 10, 1976.

Within the Rwandan government, Nsengiyumva served as chairman of the central committee of the National Republican Movement for Democracy and Development for fourteen years, until the Vatican Curia intervened in 1990, ordering him to withdraw from further political involvement. The National Republican Movement for Democracy and Development was the Hutu-dominated ruling party in Rwanda between 1975 and 1994.

Nsengiyumva was a personal friend of then Rwandan President Juvenal Habyarimana, whose portrait pin he wore while saying Mass.

On June 7, 1994, at the age of 58, he was murdered near the Kabgayi church center with two bishops, ten priests, and a child, by soldiers of the Tutsi-dominated Rwandan Patriotic Front. The RPF claimed that the soldiers believed that the prelates were involved with the killing of their families during the Rwandan Genocide.

Catholic Church titles
Preceded by Aloysius Bigirumwami	Bishop of Nyundo; 1973–1976	Succeeded by Wenceslas Kalibushi
Preceded by None (Archdiocese created)	Archbishop of Kigali; 1976–1994	Succeeded by Thaddée Ntihinyurwa
