= Diocese of Kibungo =

Diocese of the Catholic Church in Rwanda

Diocese of Kibungo Dioecesis Kibungensis Diyosezi ya Kibungo

Location
- Country: Rwanda
- Metropolitan: Archdiocese of Kigali
- Headquarters: Kibungo, Rwanda

Statistics
- Area: 2,670 km^{2} (1,030 sq mi)
- Population: Total; Catholics: (as of 2023); 1,063,554; 377,022 (35.4%)
- Parishes: 22

Information
- Denomination: Catholic Church
- Sui iuris church: Latin Church
- Rite: Roman Rite
- Established: 5 September 1968; 57 years ago
- Secular priests: 71

Current leadership
- Pope: Leo XIV
- Bishop: Jean-Marie Vianney Twagirayezu
- Metropolitan Archbishop: Antoine Kambanda
- Bishops emeritus: Antoine Kambanda; Kizito Bahujimihigo

Map
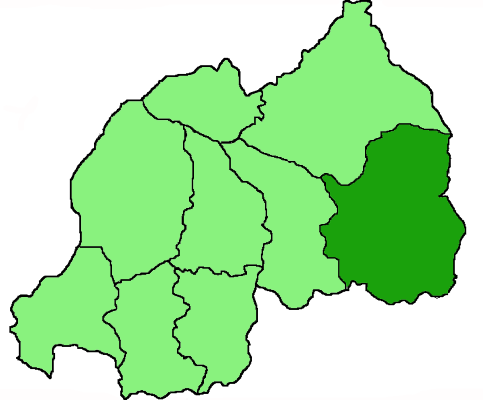

The Roman Catholic Diocese of Kibungo (Latin: Dioecesis Kibungensis) is an ecclesiastical territory or diocese of the Catholic Church in Rwanda. It was erected on 5 September 1968 by Pope John XXIII. The diocese is a suffragan of the Archdiocese of Kigali.

== Bishops ==
=== Ordinaries ===
- Joseph Sibomana (5 September 1969 – 30 March 1992), retired
- Frédéric Rubwejanga (30 March 1992 – 28 August 2007), retired
- Kizito Bahujimihigo (28 August 2007 – 29 January 2010), resigned
  - Apostolic Administrator Thaddée Ntihinyurwa (29 January 2010 – 20 July 2013)
- Antoine Kambanda (7 May 2013 – 19 November 2018), appointed Archbishop of Kigali
- Jean-Marie Vianney Twagirayezu since 20 January 2023.

=== Other priests of this diocese who became bishops ===
- Anastase Mutabazi, appointed Bishop of Kagbayi in 1996
- Servilien Nzakamwita, appointed Bishop of Byumba in 1996
