= SOAWR =

African women's rights organization

Solidarity for African Women's Rights
- Founded: 2004
- Type: Coalition of civil society organisations
- Purpose: Women's rights, gender equality
- Location: Africa
- Region served: 33 African countries
- Services: Advocacy, legal action, community mobilisation
- Method: Advocacy, legal aid, public awareness, research
- Members: 80+ organisations
- Website: soawr.org

Solidarity for African Women's Rights known as SOAWR is a coalition of over 80 civil society organisations working across 33 African countries to promote and protect women's rights. Established in 2004, SOAWR works to advance the rights of women and girls as articulated in the Protocol to the African Charter on Human and Peoples' Rights on the Rights of Women in Africa ("The Maputo Protocol").

SOAWR has played a key role in advocating for the ratification, domestication, and implementation of the Maputo Protocol across African Union (AU) member states. As of 2023, 43 out of 54 eligible countries have ratified the protocol.

== Objectives ==
The Coalition's main objectives are:

- To accelerate the ratification of the Maputo Protocol in non-ratifying states.
- To support the implementation of the Protocol in ratifying states.
- To track and document the progress of implementation at national and regional levels.
- To strengthen national and community mobilisation efforts to promote and apply the Protocol.
- To enhance coalition members' knowledge and advocacy strategies regarding the Protocol.

== Achievements ==
Since its formation, SOAWR has made significant contributions in the fight for women's rights across Africa:

- Conducted an advocacy campaign that led to the Protocol coming into force just 18 months after its adoption, the shortest interval for a human rights treaty in AU history.
- Launched a mobile campaign, 'Text Now 4 Women's Rights,' to engage thousands of African mobile phone users in promoting ratification.
- Successfully advocated for the ratification of the Protocol by 43 AU states, covering over 75% of AU member countries.
- Published "A Guide to Using the Protocol on the Rights of Women in Africa for Legal Action" in four AU official languages: Arabic, English, French, and Portuguese.
- Contributed to the development of General Comments on Article 14 (1) (d) and (e) of the Protocol, which focuses on the rights of women living with HIV/AIDS.
- Trained over 150 lawyers from 32 African states on using the Protocol in strategic litigation since 2010.
- Partnered with the AU Commission's Women, Gender, and Development Directorate and UN Women to encourage governments to adopt a multi-sectoral approach to implementing the Protocol in 12 African states.
- Published "Journey to Equality: 10 Years of the Protocol on the Rights of Women in Africa," a comprehensive evaluation of the progress made in implementing the Protocol.

A 2017 article published in the Proceedings of the American Society of International Law (ASIL) Annual Meeting credited SOAWR's advocacy as contributing to gender parity developments in African regional courts, alongside broader legal and cultural shifts such as the Maputo Protocol.

== 20th anniversary ==
The 20th anniversary of the Maputo Protocol was celebrated with a series of events across Africa organised by SOAWR. Key activities included a high-level diplomatic dialogue in Addis Ababa, diplomatic advocacy visits in Nairobi targeting non-ratifying states, and a two-day commemoration in Nairobi in July 2023. The anniversary also involved the preparation of a report and declaration to be presented at future African Union summits and international conferences.

To mark the 20th anniversary of the Maputo Protocol in 2023, SOAWR launched the 20 for 20 Solidarity Awards, aimed at recognising 20 individuals and organisations that have significantly contributed to advancing the Protocol at national, regional, and continental levels.

The awards covered ten categories, including:

- Normative Change
- Resilience (Long Standing)
- Access to Justice
- Women's Economic, Social, and Cultural Rights
- Sexual and Reproductive Health and Rights (SRHR)
- Equality in the Family
- Sexual and Gender-Based Violence (SGBV) and Ending Harmful Practices
- Women's Political Rights
- Inclusion and Diversity
- Young Women's Leadership

The winners were honoured at a high-level awards gala on July 11, 2023, in Nairobi, Kenya, attended by government officials, activists, and international organisations.

== Partnerships and collaborations ==
SOAWR is listed as a key stakeholder in Oxfam's Gender Justice and Women's Rights program, which works to address gender inequality across several African countries. The program aims to promote women's rights through collaboration with civil society organizations, regional economic communities, and various African Union organs.

In 2023, the United Nations Development Programme (UNDP) described SOAWR and Equality Now as collaborators on the report Gender Equality and International Law in Africa: The Role of Regional Economic Communities, developed under a regional project on advancing gender equality and women's empowerment in Africa.
