= Thaddée Ntihinyurwa =

Rwandan Catholic prelate (born 1962

The Most Reverend Thaddée Ntihinyurwa
- Archbishop Emeritus of Kigali, Rwanda
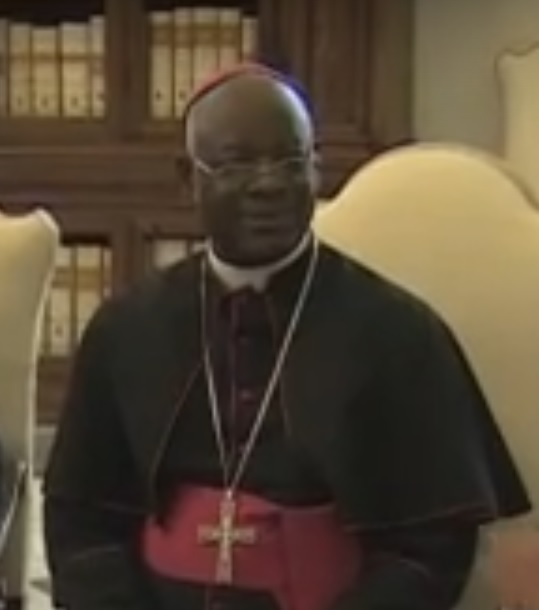
- Bishop Thaddée Ntihinyurwa in 2014
- Church: Catholic Church
- Archdiocese: Roman Catholic Archdiocese of Kigali
- See: Kigali
- Appointed: 9 March 1996
- Installed: 9 March 1996
- Term ended: 19 November 2018
- Predecessor: Vincent Nsengiyumva
- Successor: Antoine Kambanda
- Other posts: Bishop of Cyangugu (5 November 1981 - 9 March 1996); Apostolic Administrator of Kigali (11 November 1994 - 9 March 1996); Apostolic Administrator of Kabgayi (10 December 2004 - 26 March 2006); Apostolic Administrator of Kibungo (29 January 2010 - 20 July 2013)

Orders
- Ordination: 11 July 1971
- Consecration: 24 January 1982 by Thomas Anthony White
- Rank: Bishop

Personal details
- Born: Thaddée Ntihinyurwa; 25 September 1942 (age 84) Kibeho, Rwanda

Styles of Thaddée Ntihinyurwa
- Reference style: Your Grace; The Most Reverend
- Spoken style: His Grace
- Religious style: Bishop

Thaddée Ntihinyurwa (born 25 September 1942) is a Rwandan Catholic prelate who served as the Archbishop of Kigali, Rwanda from 1996 until his age-related retirement on 19 November 2018. Before that, from November 1991 until March 1996 he was Bishop of Cyangugu, Rwanda. He was appointed Bishop on 5 November 1981 by Pope John Paul II. He retired on 19 November 2018 at the age of 76 years. He lives on as Archbishop Emeritus of Kigali, Rwanda.

== Early years ==
He was born on 25 September 1942, at Kibeho, Kibeho Parish, in the Diocese of Gikongoro, Nyaruguru District, in the Southern Province of Rwanda. He studied both philosophy and theology before he was ordained a priest on 11 July 1971.

== Priest ==
He was ordained a priest of the Catholic Diocese of Butare, Rwanda on 11 July 1971. He served in that capacity until 5 November 1981.

== As bishop ==
On 5 Nov 1981, Pope John Paul II appointed Reverend Father Thaddée Ntihinyurwa as the new bishop of Cyangugu Catholic Diocese in Rwanda, which The Holy Father created that day.

He was consecrated and installed in Cyangugu, Diocese of Cyangugu on 24 January 1982 by the hands of Archbishop Thomas Anthony White, Titular Archbishop of Sebana assisted by Bishop Jean-Baptiste Gahamanyi, Bishop of Butare and Bishop Wenceslas Kalibushi, Bishop of Nyundo.

He served as Apostolic Administrator of Kigali Archdiocese from 11 November 1994 until 9 March 1996. He also served as Apostolic Administrator of Kabgayi Diocese from 10 December 2004 until 26 March 2006 and as Apostolic Administrator of Kibungo Diocese from 29 January 2010 until 20 July 2013. On 19 November 2018 his age related retirement was approved and he was succeeded by Bishop Antoine Kambanda, who was installed on 27 January 2019.

== See also ==
- Catholic Church in Rwanda

== Succession table ==
Catholic Church titles
Preceded by None (Diocese Created on 5 November 1981)	Bishop of Cyangugu (5 November 1981 - 9 March 1996)	Succeeded by Jean Damascène Bimenyimana (2 January 1997 - 11 March 2018)
Preceded by Vincent Nsengiyumva (10 April 1976 - 8 June 1994)	Archbishop of Kigali (9 March 1996 - 19 November 2018)	Succeeded by Antoine Kambanda (since 19 November 2018)
