= Edouard Sinayobye =

Rwandan Roman Catholic bishop

- Bishop
- Church: Roman Catholic Church
- Diocese: Cyangugu
- Appointed: 6 February 2021
- Predecessor: Bishop Jean Damascene Bimenyimana

Orders
- Ordination: 12 August 2000

Personal details
- Born: April 20, 1966 (age 60)
- Education: PhD in Spiritual Theology, Teresianum
- Alma mater: Nyakibanda Major Seminary

Edouard Sinayobye (born April 20, 1966, in Gisagara District, Southern Province, Rwanda) is a Rwandan clergyman, author and Catholic Bishop of Cyangugu Diocese.

== Early life and education ==
Sinayobye Edouard was born on 20 April 1966 in Butare province in the South of Rwanda. He attended a local primary school at Higiro Catholic Parish in 1973–1982. From 1988 to 1993, He attended Saint Léon minor Seminary in Kabgayi where he obtained an Advanced diploma in Latin and modern languages. After secondary studies, he studied at Rutongo Propaedeutic Seminary before heading to Nyakibanda Major Seminary where he studied philosophy and theology. He received the sacrament of ordination for the diocese of Butare on August 12, 2000. From 2008 to 2013 he studied in Rome at the Pontifical Institute of Spirituality Teresianum where he obtained his PhD in Spiritual Theology.

== Priesthood ==
After ordination, he was chaplain at Butare Cathedral and director of the diocesan commission Justitia et Pax until 2005 . He was then Priest in Gakoma Catholic Parish for three years and a member of the diocese's finance commission. During his doctoral studies, he also worked in his home diocese as Caritas director and diocesan economist. From 2014 until his appointment as bishop he was Rector of the Propaedeutic Seminary in Nyumba. He lectures in spiritual theology at the Nyakibanda Major Seminary and at the Catholic University of Rwanda. Reverend Sinayobye was a secretary of the Vocational Pastoral Commission of the Rwandan Bishops' Conference and a member of the National Committee for the Eucharistic Congresses.

On February 6, 2021, Pope Francis appointed him Bishop of Cyangugu.
