= Protestant Council of Rwanda =

Christian Ecumenical Organization

The Protestant Council of Rwanda (Conseil Protestant du Rwanda) is a Christian ecumenical organization founded in Rwanda in 1935. It is a member of the World Council of Churches, the All Africa Conference of Churches and the Fellowship of Christian Councils and Churches in the Great Lakes and Horn of Africa.
