= Diocese of Nyundo =

Diocese of the Catholic Church in Rwanda

Coordinates: 1°42′18″S 29°19′31″E

Diocese of Nyundo Dioecesis Nyundoensis Diyosezi ya Nyundo

Location
- Country: Rwanda
- Metropolitan: Archdiocese of Kigali
- Headquarters: Gisenyi, Western Province, Rwanda

Statistics
- Area: 4,000 km^{2} (1,500 sq mi)
- Population: Total; Catholics: (as of 2023); 1,886,359; 663,372 (35.2%)
- Parishes: 28

Information
- Denomination: Catholic Church
- Sui iuris church: Latin Church
- Rite: Roman Rite
- Established: 14 February 1952; 74 years ago
- Secular priests: 102 Diocesan

Current leadership
- Pope: Leo XIV
- Bishop: Anaclet Mwumvaneza
- Metropolitan Archbishop: Antoine Kambanda
- Bishops emeritus: Alexis Habiyambere, S.J.

Map
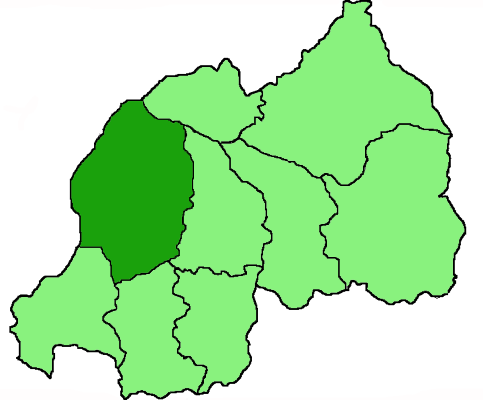

The Roman Catholic Diocese of Nyundo is an ecclesiastical territory or diocese of the Roman Catholic Church in Rwanda, with headquarters at Nyundo. It was erected on 14 February 1952 as the Apostolic Vicariate of Nyundo by Pope Pius XII, from part of the Apostolic Vicariate of Ruanda. It was elevated to the rank of a diocese on 10 November 1959 by Pope John XXIII. The diocese is a suffragan of the Archdiocese of Kigali.

The current Bishop of Nyundo is Anaclet Mwumvaneza.

== Leadership ==
(All Roman Rite)

=== Apostolic Vicar of Nyundo ===
- Aloys Bigirumwami (14 February 1952 – 10 November 1959 see below)

=== Bishops of Nyundo ===
- Aloys Bigirumwami (see above 10 November 1959 – 17 December 1973), resigned
- Vincent Nsengiyumva (17 December 1973 – 10 April 1976), appointed Archbishop of Kigali
- Wenceslas Kalibushi (9 December 1976 – 2 January 1997), retired
- Alexis Habiyambere, SJ (2 January 1997 – 11 March 2016), retired
- Anaclet Mwumvaneza (11 March 2016 – Present)

=== Other priests of this diocese who became bishop ===
- Jean Damascène Bimenyimana (1980-1981), appointed Bishop of Cyangugu in 1997
- Vincent Harolimana (1990-2012), appointed Bishop of Ruhengeri in 2012
- Jean-Marie Vianney Twagirayezu (1995-2023), appointed Bishop of Kibungo in 2023
