= Zaza, Rwanda =

Zaza
- Sector
- Location within Rwanda
- Coordinates: 2.155258°S 30.431056°E
- Country: Rwanda
- Province: Eastern
- District: Ngoma

Area
  - Total: 61.55 km^{2} (23.76 sq mi)

Population (2022 census)
  - Total: 27,836
  - Density: 452.3/km^{2} (1,171/sq mi)

Zaza is a sector in Rwanda to the east of Lake Mugesera and about 10 miles (16 km) west of Kibungo. It is located in the Ngoma District of the Eastern Province of Rwanda.

The entire population of the sector are living in rural areas (2022 census), on an area of 61.55 square kilometers.

== History ==
The White Fathers founded a mission at Zaza in January 1902, where they taught the local people reading, writing and the gospel. A huge number of local laborers were recruited to assist in building the mission, causing friction with the local notables. At first, the priests were not particularly selective in baptizing people. After several hundred had been baptized at Zara, Bishop John Joseph Hirth asked them to baptise fewer but of better quality. Zaza was the birthplace of Aloys Bigirumwami, the first Rwandan to become a bishop. Later the Carmelite sisters founded a monastery at Zara. They adopted local customs, and in 1967 left the monastery building, built huts in the local style, and began to support themselves through farming.
