= St. Leon Minor Seminary, Kabgayi =

St Léon Minor Seminary of Kabgayi
- Petit Séminaire Saint Léon Kabgayi
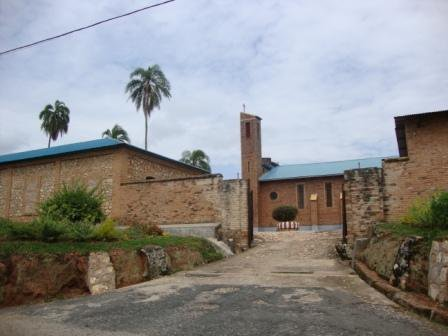
- Rwanda, Southern Province

Information
- Motto: Paravi lucernam Christo meo (I have prepared a lamp for my Christ)
- Patron saint: Saint Léon
- Established: October 4th, 1913
- Founder: Bishop Joseph Hirth
- Rector: Father Irenee MUDAHERANWA
- Song: Horana Ishema n'Isheja Seminari
- Alumni: 5100

St Léon Minor Seminary of Kabgayi is a Catholic church minor seminary located in Kabgayi, Southern province of Rwanda. The school is owned by Kabgayi Diocese of Catholic Church of Rwanda. Established in 1913, the seminary is the oldest formal school in Rwanda. The minor seminary of Kabgayi has educated a number of notable people both in the church and politics. The seminary's alumni include two former Presidents of Republic of Rwanda, several catholic church bishops, two former Presidents of Rwanda's senate, tens of ministers, several members of the parliament and hundreds of Catholic priests.

== Foundation ==
After the creation of Apostolic Vicariate of Kivu in 1912, its first Vicar Bishop John Joseph Hirth founded Saint Léon Minor Seminary in Nyaruhengeri near Save. The seminary opened in January 1913 with 16 students from Rwaza, Nyundo, Kabgayi and Save. On 4 October 1913, the new established seminary of Nyaruhengeri was transferred to Kabgayi where it has been operating up today.

The first 16 students of the Minor Seminary of Nyaruhengeri then of Kabgayi are Albert Kanyamudale, Aloys Balitubya, Ignace Ndenzaho, Ferdinand Kabunda, Mercure Bazilake, Boniface Mufuri, Laurent Kirobafi, Ananias Kanyamugenge, Simon Bapfakurera, Laurent Sehene, Albert Ndagijimana, Joseph Binego, Aster Senzige, Velan Majanja and Abraham Aholihisa. On 9 October 1913, new students arrived at Kabgayi to start the first year of seminary.

As of 2012, St Léon Minor Seminary of Kabgayi educated 5078 students.

== Notable alumni ==
As the oldest formal education institution, the influence of St Léon Minor Seminary of Kabgayi is visible in political space and Catholic church of Rwanda. Among the notable alumni include:

- Bishop Aloys Bigirumwami: First Rwandan Catholic bishop
- Gregoire Kayibanda: Rwandan politician and former President
- Juvenal Habyarima: Rwandan politician and former President
- Gaspard Cyimana: Rwandan politician and former Minister of Finance
- Alexis Kagame: African philosopher, poet, linguistic and Catholic priest
- Ngarambe Francois: Rwanda politician and General secretary of FRP Inkotanyi
- Cyprien Rugamba: Rwandan poet and religious leader
- Bernard Makuza: Rwandan politician, former Senate President and Prime Minister
- Augustin Banyaga: Rwandan-born American mathematician
- Anaclet Mwumvaneza: Catholic Bishop of Nyundo Diocese since March 2016.
