= Diocese of Byumba =

Diocese of the Catholic Church in Rwanda

Coordinates: 1.5733°S 30.0557°E

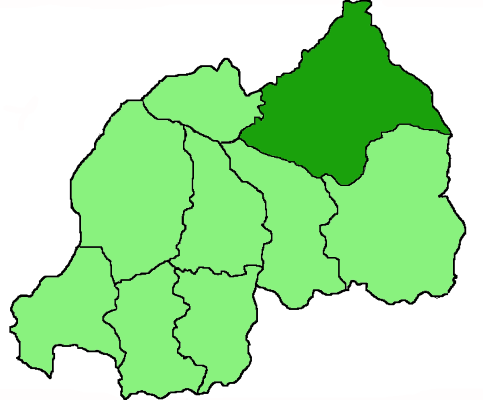
Diocese of Byumba in the map of Rwanda

The Roman Catholic Diocese of Byumba (Latin: Dioecesis Byumbanus) is an ecclesiastical territory or diocese of the Roman Catholic Church in Rwanda. It was erected on November 5, 1981, by Pope John Paul II. The diocese is a suffragan of the Archdiocese of Kigali.

== List of bishops of Byumba ==
- Joseph Ruzindana (1981-1994)
- Servilien Nzakamwita (1996–2022)
- Papias Musengamana (2022–present)
