= Diocese of Butare =

Diocese of the Catholic Church in Rwanda

Coordinates: 2.6069°S 29.7429°E

Diocese of Butare Dioecesis Butarensis
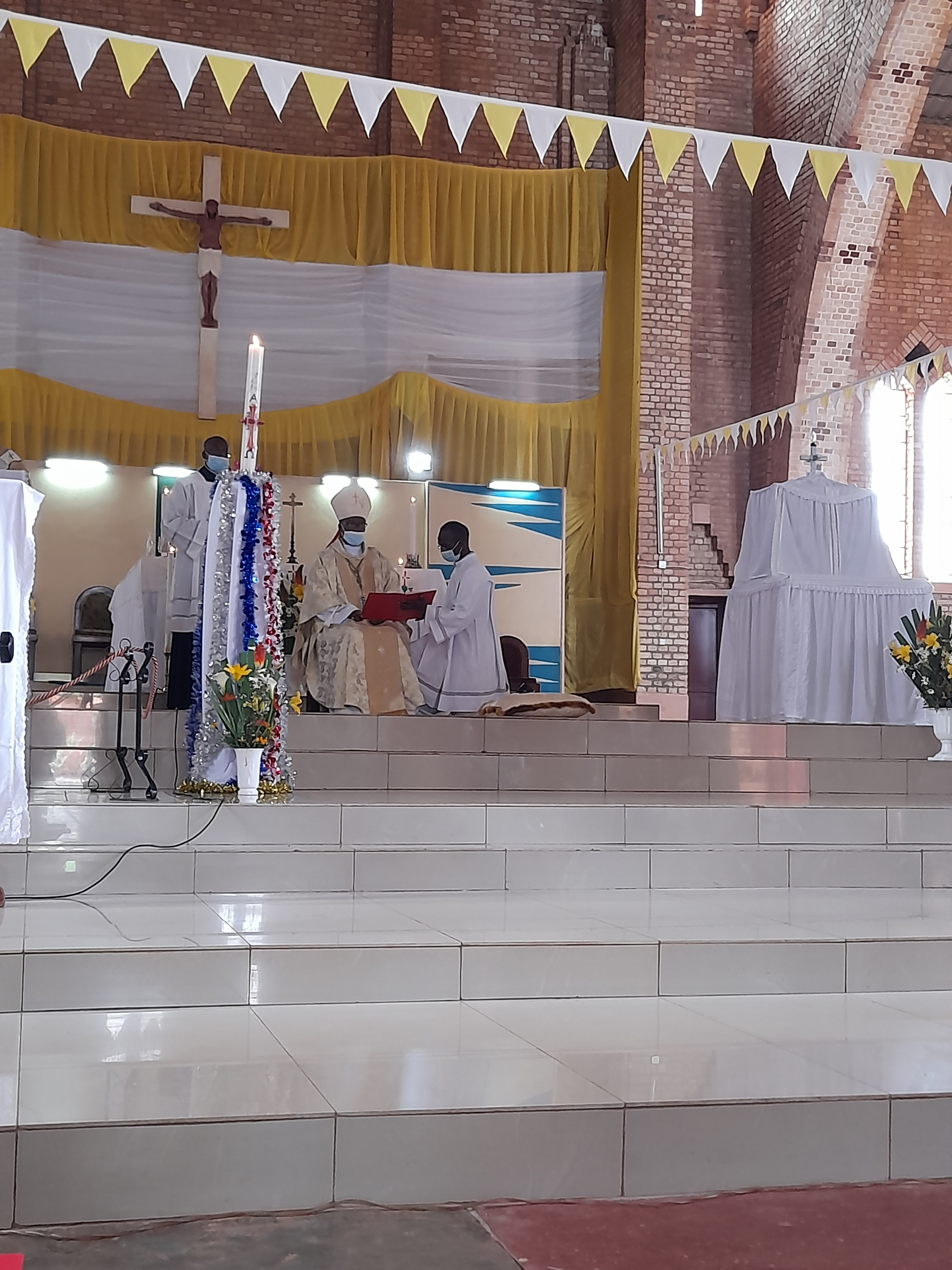
- Easter Mass 2021 at Butare

Location
- Country: Rwanda
- Ecclesiastical province: Southern

Statistics
- Area: 1,958 km^{2} (756 sq mi)
- Population: Total; Catholics: (as of 2021); 1,269,540; 691,850(est.) (54.5%%)
- Parishes: 26

Information
- Denomination: Catholic Church
- Rite: Roman Rite

Current leadership
- Pope: Leo XIV
- Bishop: Jean Bosco Ntagungira
- Bishops emeritus: Philippe Rukamba

Map
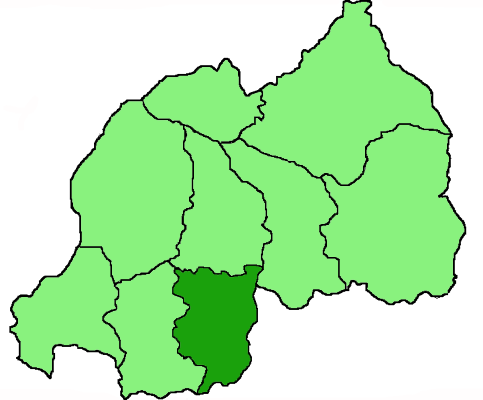

Website
- www.butarecatholicdiocese.com

The Roman Catholic Diocese of Butare is an ecclesiastical territory or diocese of the Roman Catholic Church in Rwanda. It was erected on 11 September 1961 as the Diocese of Astrida by Pope John XXIII, and was later renamed as the Diocese of Butare on 12 November 1963 by Pope Paul VI. The diocese is a suffragan of the Archdiocese of Kigali. Phillipe Rukamba was appointed Bishop of Butare by Pope John Paul II on 2 January 1997.

A prominent priest of this diocese was Monsignor Eulad Rudahunga, serving from 1953 to 2019, and made a Monsignor by Pope John Paul II.

On 12 August 2024, Pope Francis appointed Jean Bosco Ntagungira as bishop.

== Bishops ==
=== List of bishops of Butare ===
- Jean-Baptiste Gahamanyi (1961–1997)
- Philippe Rukamba (1997–2024)
- Jean Bosco Ntagungira (2024-Present)

=== Auxiliary Bishop ===
- Félicien Muvara (1988), did not take effect
