= Diocese of Ruhengeri =

Diocese of the Catholic Church in Rwanda

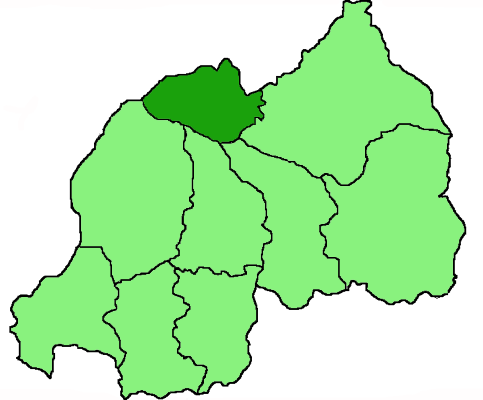

The Roman Catholic Diocese of Ruhengeri (Latin: Dioecesis Ruhengeriensis) is an ecclesiastical territory or diocese of the Roman Catholic Church in Rwanda. It was erected on 20 December 1960 by Pope John XXIII. The diocese is a suffragan of the Archdiocese of Kigali. The current bishop is Vincent Harolimana.

The diocese counts 11 parishes and covers the former Ruhengeri province in the current Musanze district. The diocese has been recovering from the war disaster since 1990–1998, and by the efforts by Bishop Bahujimihigo, it is moving towards a truly national ranking. The diocese owns one of the leading institution of higher learning (INES, Institut d'enseignement superieur de Ruhengeri) and a practical hospital (Hôpital de Nemba).

== List of bishops of Ruhengeri ==
- Bernard Manyurane (1960–1961)
- Joseph Sibomana (1961–1969)
- Phocas Nikwigize (1968–1996)
- Kizito Bahujimihigo (1997–2007)
- Vincent Harolimana (since 2012)
