= Nyundo, Rubavu =

Nyundo
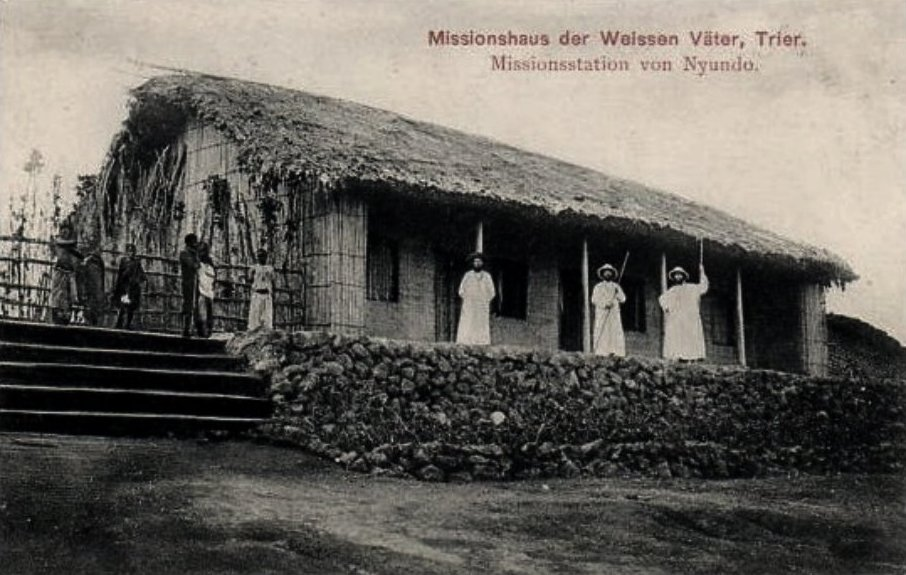
- Nyundo mission in 1901

- Location within Rwanda
- Coordinates: 1.700571°S 29.327488°E
- Country: Rwanda
- Province: Western
- District: Rubavu
- Sector: Nyundo
- Established: 1901
- Climate: Aw

Nyundo is a community in the Rubavu District of Western Province, Rwanda, on the Sebeya River to the east of Gisenyi. It is the location of one of the first Catholic missions to be established in Rwanda, and today is the headquarters of the Roman Catholic Diocese of Nyundo.

== Location ==
Nyundo is in Kanama commune, beside the Rubavu commune, and contains a seminary, schools and the residence of the bishop. It is about 12 kilometres (7.5 mi) to the east of Gisenyi, which is on the northeast shore of Lake Kivu.

== Early years ==
German forces occupied Rwanda in 1897. In 1899 the White Fathers missionary John Joseph Hirth traveled to that country. There he tried to develop a relationship with King Yuhi Musinga. Hirth gained permission to found the first Catholic missions in Rwanda at Save, Zaza and Nyundo between 1900 and 1901. The church felt that if the king and the Tutsi ruling class of Rwanda were converted, the rest of the population would automatically accept the Catholic faith, so they focused their effort on the Tutsis.

The Nyundo mission was founded on 4 April 1901. The German colonial authority established an important base at Kisenyi, in alliance with the Tutsi elite, and the missionaries at Nyundo found themselves obliged to take the side of the Tutsis. When Hutu Christians took action against Tutsi exactions, the priests were blamed for causing this insubordination. The local Tutsi rulers also resented the missionaries, with their growing power and demands.

The mission was badly damaged during World War I, since it was close to the important defensive line between German and Belgian territory. The German forces lived off the land, and when they retreated in 1916 they first destroyed banana groves that could provide supplies to their opponents. The local people, who had gone into hiding, were unable to sow their crops. When the priests returned they were able to feed about two hundred people at the mission, but many more starved. Malnutrition was followed by outbreaks of smallpox, cerebrospinal meningitis and dysentery. Despite large-scale vaccinations by the fathers, more than two thousand people died in July 1918 alone.

== Later history ==
The Vicariate of Nyundo was erected on 14 February 1952, elevated to a diocese five years later. The diocese covers most of the northern part of Western Province, including the districts of Ngororero, Rutsiro, Rubavu, Karongi and parts of Nyabihu and Nyamasheke. Its first bishop was Aloys Bigirumwami. He was first African bishop to be appointed in the Belgian colonies (Rwanda, Burundi and Congo) and sixth African to be made a Catholic bishop.

There was an outbreak of violence against Tutsis at Nyundo during the Rwandan genocide. The morning after the death of President Juvénal Habyarimana, on 7 April 1994 a number of Tutsi families came to Nyundo for safety. A large, hostile and armed crowd arrived, and the killing began, including women and children who took refuge in the chapel. The bishop, Mr. Wenceslas Kalibushi, was taken to Gisenyi and was later released at the request of the Vatican. A genocide memorial was later established with the graves of about 800 people, between a school and a seminary. Floods in 2012 damaged the graves, and a new location had to be found for the memorial.

== Orphanage ==
The "Noël de Nyundo" orphanage was first established in 1954 at Muramba, in Kingogo Region, to receive children whose mothers had died in childbirth. Until then they had traditionally been buried with their mother. A new building at Nyundo was authorized in 1964. It admitted its first children on Christmas 1966. During the disturbances of 1994 the children had to take refuge for a few months in Goma, in the Democratic Republic of the Congo. The orphanage was badly damaged.

As of 2012 the orphanage, one of the largest in the country, was home to 189 children under eighteen and to 254 adults, including fourteen with mental disabilities. The adults had entered the orphanage as children and had difficulty learning how to cope outside.
