= Catholic Church in Rwanda =

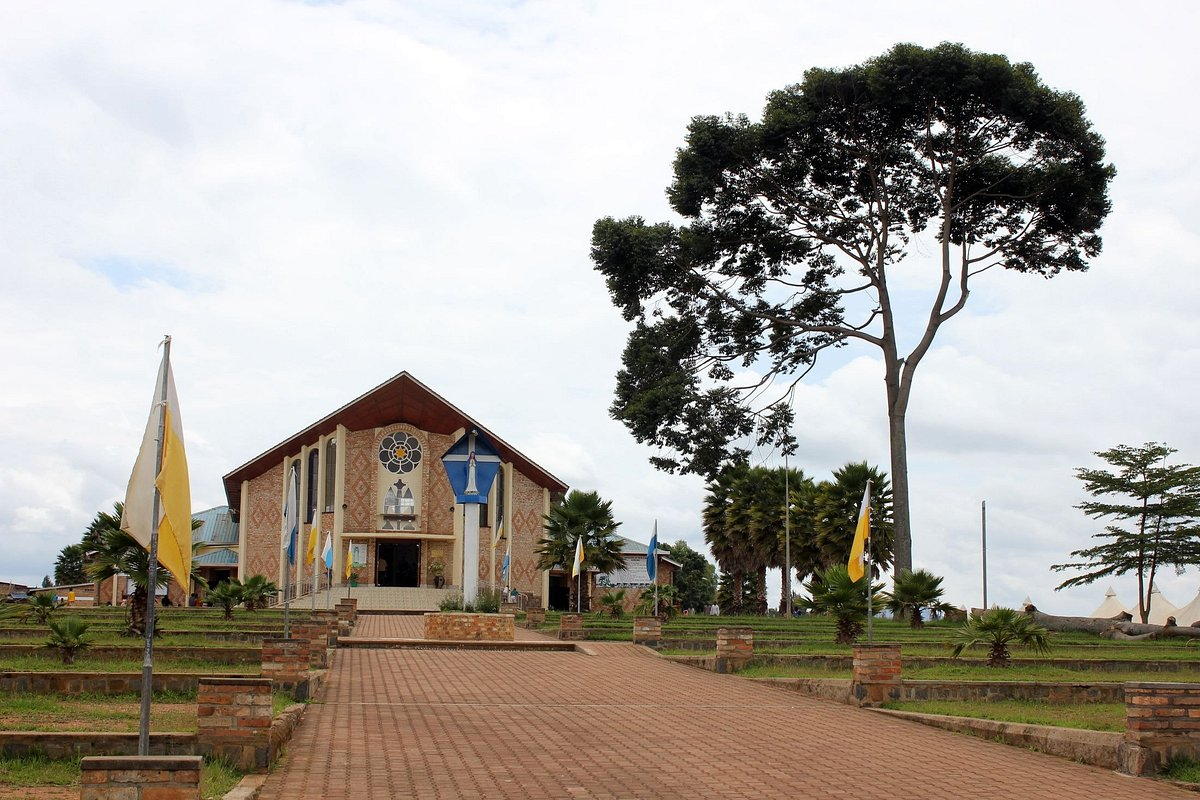
The Sanctuary of Our Lady of Kibeho

The Catholic Church in Rwanda is part of the worldwide Catholic Church.

There are just over five million Catholics in Rwanda - about half of the total population. The country is divided into nine dioceses including one archdiocese. The Rwandan government reported in 2012 that 43% of the Rwanda's population is Catholic. By 2024, membership of the church had stabilised at 45% of the population.

In 2020, there were 939 priest and 2219 nuns serving across 205 parishes.

== History ==
Catholic missionaries known as the White Fathers established a mission station in Rwanda in 1900, during the German colonial period; by the 1950s the Catholic church was beginning to actively support the demands for the end of the unequal relations between Tutsi and Hutu.

In the early 1980s, the village of Kibeho experienced an apparition of the Virgin Mary; two shrines were built in commemoration of this event.

By 2012, about 55% of the country’s population was affiliated with the Catholic Church. By 2015, this was less than 46%. The 5th Population and Housing Census of 2022 counted 39,91 % Catholics.

On November 20, 2016, the Catholic Church in Rwanda released a statement apologizing for the role of its members in the genocide in 1994. "We apologize for all the wrongs the church committed. We apologize on behalf of all Christians for all forms of wrongs we committed. We regret that church members violated (their) oath of allegiance to God's commandments. Forgive us for the crime of hate in the country to the extent of also hating our colleagues because of their ethnicity. We didn't show that we are one family but instead killed each other," said a statement signed by the nine bishops constituting the Catholic Episcopal Conference of Rwanda.

In 2022, the Vatican Statistical Yearbook reported almost 1,000 priests and over 2,400 nuns serving 223 parishes across the country.

The country was reported as having a religious freedom rating of moderate/low.

== Organisation ==
=== Archdioceses and dioceses ===
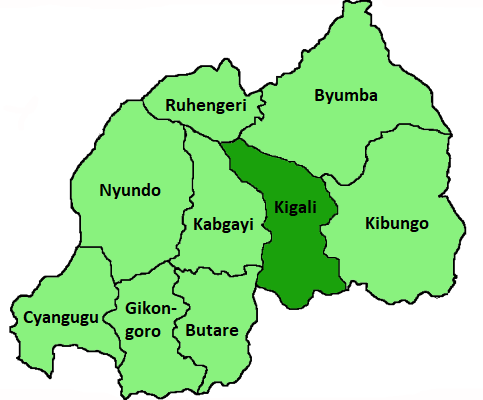
Map of dioceses in Rwanda

The Roman Catholic Church in Rwanda is composed of 1 ecclesiastical territory with 7 suffragan dioceses.

- Archdiocese of Kigali
  - Diocese of Butare
  - Diocese of Byumba
  - Diocese of Cyangugu
  - Diocese of Gikongoro
  - Diocese of Kabgayi
  - Diocese of Kibungo
  - Diocese of Nyundo
  - Diocese of Ruhengeri

== Notable Catholic Rwandans ==
- Immaculée Ilibagiza, author who has detailed her experience of the 1994 Rwandan genocide through the lens of her Catholic faith.
- Félicité Niyitegeka, Auxiliaries of the Apostolate, died during the Rwandan genocide.

== See also ==
- Religion in Rwanda
- Our Lady of Kibeho
