= Archdiocese of Kigali =

Archdiocese of the Catholic Church in Rwanda

Coordinates: 1.9500°S 30.0500°E

Archdiocese of Kigali Archidioecesis Kigaliensis Arikidiyosezi ya Kigali

Location
- Country: Rwanda
- Headquarters: Kigali, Rwanda

Statistics
- Area: 3,271 km^{2} (1,263 sq mi)
- Population: Total; Catholics: (as of 2023); 2,022,400; 714,982 (35.4%)
- Parishes: 39

Information
- Denomination: Catholic Church
- Sui iuris church: Latin Church
- Rite: Roman Rite
- Established: 10 April 1976; 50 years ago
- Cathedral: St. Michael's Cathedral in Kigali
- Secular priests: 184

Current leadership
- Pope: Leo XIV
- Metropolitan Archbishop: Antoine Kambanda
- Bishops emeritus: Thaddée Ntihinyurwa

The Roman Catholic Archdiocese of Kigali (Latin: Archidioecesis Kigaliensis) is an ecclesiastical territory or diocese of the Roman Catholic Church in Rwanda. It was erected from the Archdiocese of Kabgayi by Pope Paul VI on April 10, 1976, with the suffragan sees of Butare, Byumba, Cyangugu, Gikongoro, Kabgayi, Kibungo, Nyundo, Ruhengeri. It is the only archdiocese within Rwanda.

The motherchurch of the archdiocese and thus seat of its archbishop is St. Michael's Cathedral.

== Bishops ==
=== List of archbishops of Kigali ===
- Vincent Nsengiyumva (10 April 1976 – 8 June 1994)
  - Apostolic Administrator Thaddée Ntihinyurwa (11 November 1994 – 9 March 1996); see below
- Thaddée Ntihinyurwa (9 March 1996 – 19 November 2018), retired
- Antoine Kambanda (19 November 2018 – Present)

=== Other priests of this diocese who became bishops ===
- Célestin Hakizimana, appointed Bishop of Gikongoro in 2014
- Anaclet Mwumvaneza, appointed Bishop of Nyundo in 2016
- Jean Bosco Ntagungira, appointed Bishop of Butare on August 12, 2024

== See also ==
- Roman Catholicism in Rwanda
- List of Roman Catholic dioceses in Rwanda
