= Michael Senyimba =

Ugandan Anglican bishop (1937–2024)

Michael Solomon Ndawula Senyimba
- Bishop of Mukono
- Church: Anglican Church of Uganda
- Diocese: Mukono
- Appointed: November 1995
- Term ended: June 2002
- Predecessor: Livingstone Mpalanyi Nkoyoyo

Orders
- Consecration: November 1995

Personal details
- Born: 2 July 1937 Bubaale village, Mawokota, Mpigi District, Uganda
- Died: 19 March 2024 (aged 86)
- Denomination: Anglican
- Education: Makerere University; University of British Columbia

Michael Solomon Ndawula Senyimba (2 July 1937 – 19 March 2024) was a Ugandan Anglican bishop who served as the second Bishop of Mukono in the Church of Uganda from November 1995 to June 2002. He succeeded Livingstone Mpalanyi Nkoyoyo, who was the first Bishop of the Diocese. He died on 19 March 2024, at the age of 86, while on retirement.

== Early life and education ==
Michael Solomon Ndawula Senyimba was born on 2 July 1937 in Bubaale village, Mawokota, Mpigi District, to Samson Ndawula Kyebakola and Mariam Kyabangi. He began his formal education relatively late, at the age of 12 at Kamengo Primary School. He then attended Kasawo Junior Secondary School before proceeding to King's College Budo for his higher studies, which he completed in 1962.

After secondary school, Senyimba enrolled at Makerere University, where he pursued a Bachelor's degree in Agriculture, majoring in Botanical Science. He furthered his studies in Nairobi, Kenya and later earned a Master's degree from the University of British Columbia in Canada. He later returned to Uganda to serve as a botany lecturer at Makerere University.

== Ministry and episcopacy ==
Before his episcopal ministry, Senyimba served the Church of Uganda in various clerical and leadership roles. In 1981, he was invited by the Namirembe Diocese to serve as Dean of Namirembe Cathedral, a position he held until 1994.

In November 1995, Senyimba was consecrated as the second Bishop of Mukono Diocese, succeeding Archbishop Livingston Mpalanyi Nkoyoyo, who had been the first bishop of the diocese before he was elected Archbishop of the Church of Uganda. During his tenure, which lasted until June 2002, Bishop Senyimba led the diocese of Mukono through a period of consolidation and growth, supporting clergy, expanding parish ministry, and encouraging educational and community-based initiatives within the diocese.

Beyond his diocesan responsibilities, Senyimba contributed to wider church and academic life. He was a founding member of Uganda Christian University, a major Church of Uganda institution, helping to shape its mission at the intersection of higher education and Christian discipleship. After he retired from active episcopal ministry, he served as Vice Chancellor of Ndejje University from 2001 to 2012, where he was credited with strengthening academic programmes and advancing the university's profile as a church-based institution of higher learning.

== Death ==
Senyimba passed away on 19 March 2024 at the age of 86. His death was confirmed by the Bishop of Mukono, Rt Rev. Enos Kitto Kagodo, and widely reported in Ugandan news media. Following his death, a series of funeral rites were held, including a service at St Andrew's Church, Migadde, a vigil and subsequent services at Namirembe Cathedral and Mukono Cathedral, with burial at the Mukono Cathedral burial grounds.

== See also ==
- Church of Uganda
- Mukono Diocese
- Livingston Mpalanyi Nkoyoyo
- Uganda Christian University
- Ndejje University
