= Anglican dioceses of Buganda =

Dioceses of the Church of Uganda

The Anglican dioceses of Buganda are the Anglican presence in the Central Region, Uganda (equivalent to the old Buganda kingdom); they are part of the Church of Uganda. The remaining dioceses of the Church are in the areas of Eastern Uganda, of Northern Uganda, of Ankole and Kigezi, and of Rwenzori.

== Diocese of Namirembe ==
The first Anglican church structure in what is now Uganda, Kenya, and Tanzania was the Diocese of Eastern Equatorial Africa, which was erected in June 1884. The first bishop was James Hannington, who made the diocesan headquarters at Mombasa, but he was assassinated (martyred) on 8 February 1886. The third Bishop of Eastern Equatorial Africa, Alfred Tucker, resolved to divide the diocese: he stayed on as Bishop of Uganda, while Kenya and part of northern Tanganyika became the Diocese of Mombasa; the division was effected in 1898.

From then until 1926 — when the Diocese of Upper Nile was dividing from it — the Diocese of Uganda included all Uganda, Rwanda and Burundi, in what was then the country of Zaire. On 1 July 1960, in preparation for the formation of an independent church province, the diocese was split in five: one of the smaller new dioceses retained the same bishop and became the Diocese of Namirembe (so her bishop became Bishop of Namirembe). After the division, the diocese's territory was East Buganda and Busoga.

Brown was elected to become the first archbishop of the new province and took up the post in 1961, when the eight dioceses were erected into the Church of the Province of Uganda and Ruanda-Urundi. The arrangement whereby the Archbishop was elected ended in 1977, when the Bishop of Kampala became Archbishop ex officio.

Since 1890, throughout its many changes, the diocese's mother church has been St Paul's Cathedral, on Namirembe hill in Kampala. The current building is the fifth Namirembe Cathedral on the same site.

=== Bishops of Eastern Equatorial Africa ===
- 1884–1885: James Hannington
- 1886–1888: Henry Parker
- 1890–1899: Alfred Tucker

=== Bishops of Uganda ===
- 1899–1908: Alfred Tucker
- 1912–1934: John Willis
  - 1920–1923: Herbert Gresford Jones, Bishop of Kamala and first suffragan of the diocese
- 1934–1953: Cyril Stuart
  - 1947 – 1960 (ret.): Aberi Balya, assistant bishop for Tooro, Bunyoro, Ankole and Kigezi
  - 1951–1960: Jim Brazier (became first diocesan Bishop of Ruanda-Urundi)
  - June 1952 – 1960: Festo Lutaya, assistant bishop (became first diocesan of West Buganda)
- 1953–1960: Leslie Brown
  - 5 May 1957 – 1960: Kosiya Shalita, assistant bishop
  - 1 May – 1 July 1960: Erica Sabiti, assistant bishop

In 1957, preparing for the split into five dioceses, Brown oversaw the creation of five "areas", to be overseen by himself and his four suffragans:

- Ruanda-Urundi had already been under Brazier's oversight since 1951
- April/May 1957 onwards: Lutaya had the West Buganda area
- 5 May 1957 onwards: Shalita, for Ankole-Kigezi (became first diocesan Bishop of Ankole-Kigezi)
- 9 May 1957 onwards: Brown took direct oversight of the East Buganda and Busoga area
- 16 May 1957 – before 1 May 1960: Balya was assistant bishop for Toro-Bunyoro until his retirement
- 1 May 1960 onwards: Sabiti succeeded Balya over Toro-Bunyoro-Mboga (became first bishop diocesan of Rwenzori)

On the split in 1960, the five men became diocesan bishops of their areas.

=== Bishops of Namirembe ===
- 1960 – 21 November 1965 (ret.): Leslie Brown, Archbishop of Uganda, Rwanda and Burundi from 1961
- 21 November 1965 – 1985: Dunstan Nsubuga, first indigenous bishop (assistant since 1964)
- 1985–1994: Misaeri Kauma (assistant bishop 1975–1985)
- 1994–2009: Samuel Ssekkadde
- 2009–2023: Kityo Luwalira (consecrated and installed 31 May 2009)
- 2023-present:Moses Banja

(consecrated and installed on 5 December 2023)

== Diocese of West Buganda ==
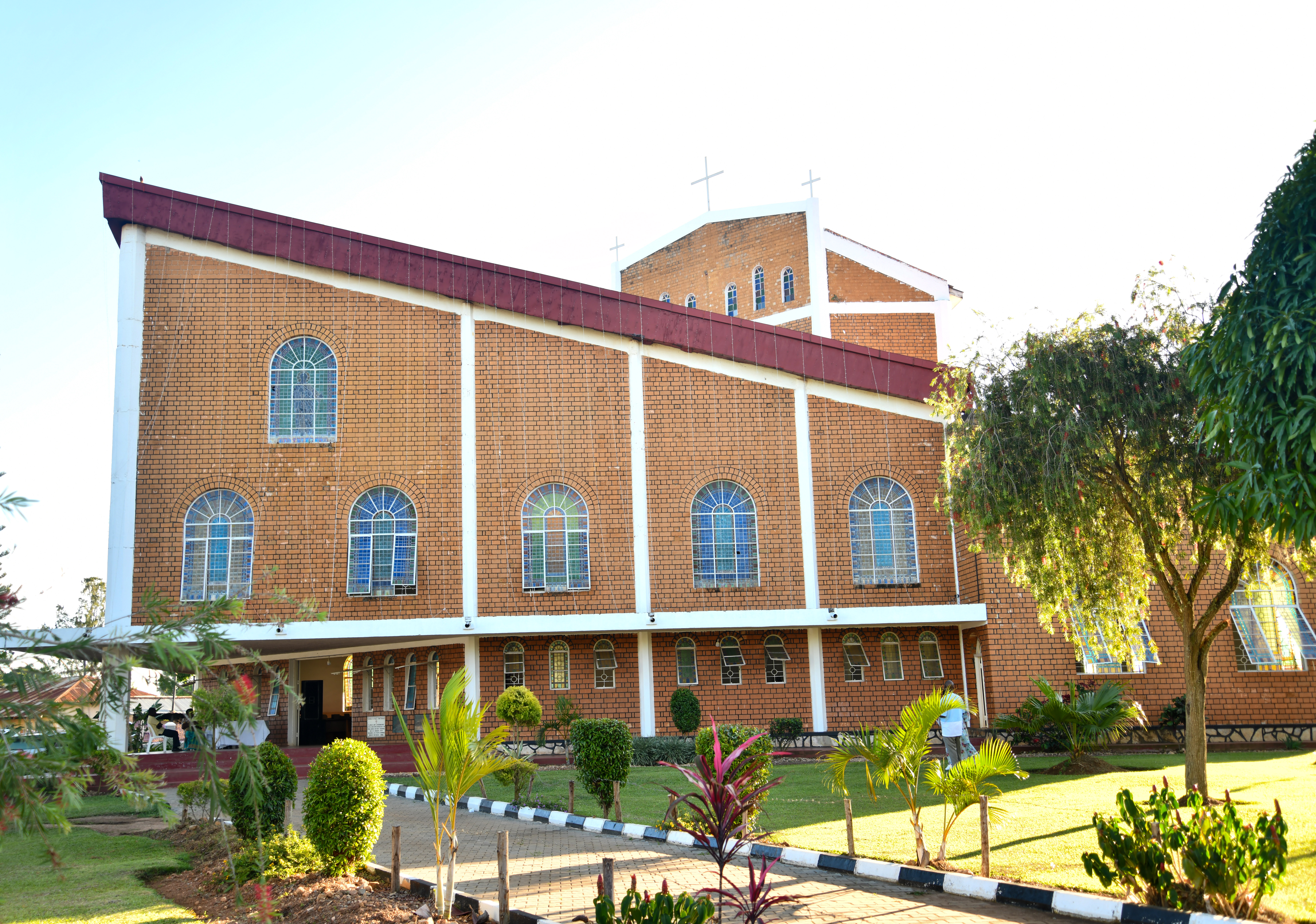
St Paul's Cathedral Kako

One of the five dioceses erected in 1960 from the Uganda diocese was that of West Buganda. Lutaaya (an assistant bishop) was made the first Bishop of West Buganda; in 1964, he moved the diocesan headquarters from Masaka to his hometown Mityana, which caused trouble in Masaka. The controversy rolled on and delayed Tomusange's enthronement in September 1966. Her cathedral has been St Paul's Cathedral, Kako (in Masaka) since before 1974.

=== Bishops of West Buganda ===
- 1960–1965 (ret.): Festo Lutaya
- 1965–?: Stephen Tomusange (previously an assistant bishop on the Upper Nile)
- before 1986 – before 2001: Christopher Senyonjo
- 2001 – 2011: Dr. Salongo Samuel Keefa Ssemakula Kamya
- January 23, 2011 – May 31, 2015 (d.): Godfrey Makumbi
- May 31, 2015 - August 28, 2016: Jackson Matovu (bishop of Central Buganda Diocese and then caretaker bishop appointed by Archbishop then, Stanley Ntagali following death of the serving bishop, Godfrey Makumbi.
- August 28, 2016 – March 30, 2025: Henry Katumba Tamale
- March 30, 2025 – Present: Gaster Nsereko

== Diocese of Kampala ==
Founded in 1972 from Namirembe diocese, the diocesan bishop of Kampala has always been Archbishop of Uganda. (They are never called Archbishop of Kampala; there is a Roman Catholic Archbishop of Kampala.) Because of the archbishop's national duties, there have often been assistant bishops in the diocese; the cathedral is All Saints on Nakasero hill, central Kampala.

=== Assistant Bishops of Kampala ===
Assistant bishops have included:

- 1983–1997: Lucas Gonahasa (previously Assistant Bishop of Bukedi)
- c. 1997 – 2004 (ret.): Eliphaz Maari
- 30 January 2005 – June 2012 (ret.): Zac Niringiye
- 10 December 2006 – ?: David Sebuhinja, assistant for the Provincial Secretariat
- 2 September 2007 – ?: John Guernsey, bishop for COU congregations in the USA
- 2014–present: Hannington Mutebi

== Diocese of Mityana ==
Erected from West Buganda and inaugurated on 22 May 1977, the Diocese of Mityana has its bishop's seat at St Andrew's Cathedral, Namukozi.

=== Bishops of Mityana ===
- 1977 – 1989: Yokana Mukasa
- 22 January 1989 – ?: Wilson Mutebi
- January 2002 – 2008: Dunstan Bukenya
- 26 October 2008 – 2020: Stephen Kaziimba (became Archbishop of Uganda and Bishop of Kampala)
- 2 February 2020 – present: James Bukomeko

== Diocese of Mukono ==
Mukono diocese was divided from Namirembe diocese in 1983, when Mpalanyi-Nkoyoyo, an assistant bishop of Namirembe, was elected the new diocese's first bishop. The mother church is SS Andrew & Philip Cathedral, Mukono.

=== Bishops of Mukono ===
- 1983 – 1995: Livingstone Mpalanyi Nkoyoyo (previously assistant bishop of Namirembe; became Archbishop of Uganda)
- November 1995 – June 2002 (ret.): Michael Senyimba
- 30 June 2002 – September 2010 (ret.): Paul Luzinda
- 19 September 2010 – 26 February 2023: James Ssebaggala

Rt Rev Enos Kitto Kagodo

- 26 February 2023 – Present

== Diocese of Luweero ==
Founded from the Diocese of Namirembe in 1991, the cathedral is St Mark's, Luweero.

=== Bishops of Luweero ===
- 8 December 1991 – 1996: Mesusera Bugimbi
- 1996–2015: Evans Mukasa
- 17 May 2015 – present: Eridard Nsubuga

Rt. Rev. Wilson Kisekka 2024- present

== Diocese of Central Buganda ==
In 1995, the Diocese of Central Buganda was created by splitting territory from the West Buganda diocese. The cathedral is at Kasaka, St John's.

=== Bishops of Central Buganda ===
- 1995–2001: George Sinabulya
- 2001–2016: Jackson Matovu
- 29 January 2017 – present: Micheal Lubowa

== See also ==
- Anglican dioceses of Ankole and Kigezi
- Anglican dioceses of Eastern Uganda
- Anglican dioceses of Northern Uganda
- Anglican dioceses of Rwenzori
- List of Roman Catholic dioceses in Uganda
