= Eliphaz Maari =

Eliphaz Maari (born 1954) is a Ugandan Anglican bishop who served as an Assistant Bishop of Kampala Diocese from 1997 to 2004, and he held senior leadership roles in Anglican theological education.

== Early life and education ==
Maari was born in 1945 and pursued theological and ministerial training before ordination. He became involved in pastoral education and Church leadership early in his career, eventually holding significant academic and ecclesiastical responsibilities within the Church of Uganda.

== Ministry ==
In 1997, Maari was appointed Assistant Bishop of the Kampala Diocese, serving alongside Archbishop Livingstone Mpalanyi Nkoyoyo as part of the senior leadership of the provincial church. During his episcopate, he worked on clergy oversight, pastoral care, and diocesan administration until his retirement from the position in 2004.

== Leadership at Uganda Christian University ==
Maari played a key role in the formation and early leadership of Uganda Christian University (UCU). When UCU was established in 1997, emerging from Bishop Tucker Theological College, Maari served as Acting Vice-Chancellor in the university's formative years, helping to guide its transition into a chartered Christian university. UCU's official history records his leadership role during the university's early development.

== Legacy ==
Beyond episcopal ministry, Maari's contributions to theological education and higher learning through UCU helped anchor the Church of Uganda's influence in the academic formation of clergy and lay leaders across East Africa.

== See also ==
- Church of Uganda
- Diocese of Kampala
- Uganda Christian University
- Anglican bishops in Uganda
