= Wilson Mutebi =

Anglican bishop that serves in uganda

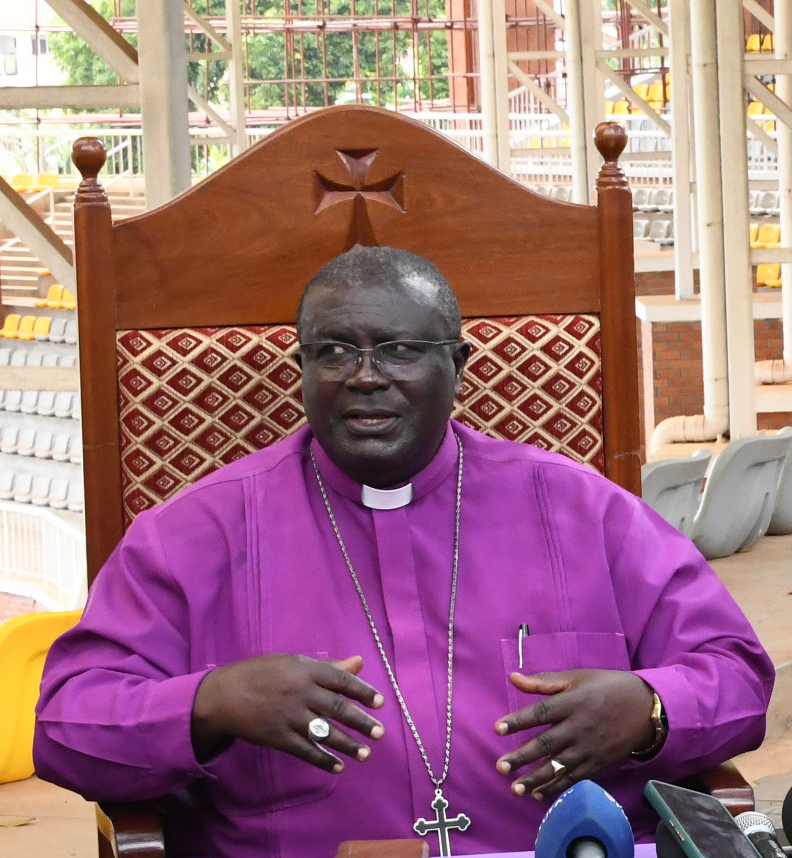
Image of Bishop Wilson Mutebi

Wilson Mutebi was an Anglican bishop. He was the second Bishop of Mityana, serving from 1989 to 2002.

Mutebi was born in 1937. He was educated at Uganda Christian University and ordained in 1972. He served in the Dioceses of Namirembe and Kampala.

== See also ==
- Livingstone Mpalanyi Nkoyoyo
- Michael Senyimba
- James Ssebaggala
