= James Bukomeko =

Anglican bishop that serves in Uganda

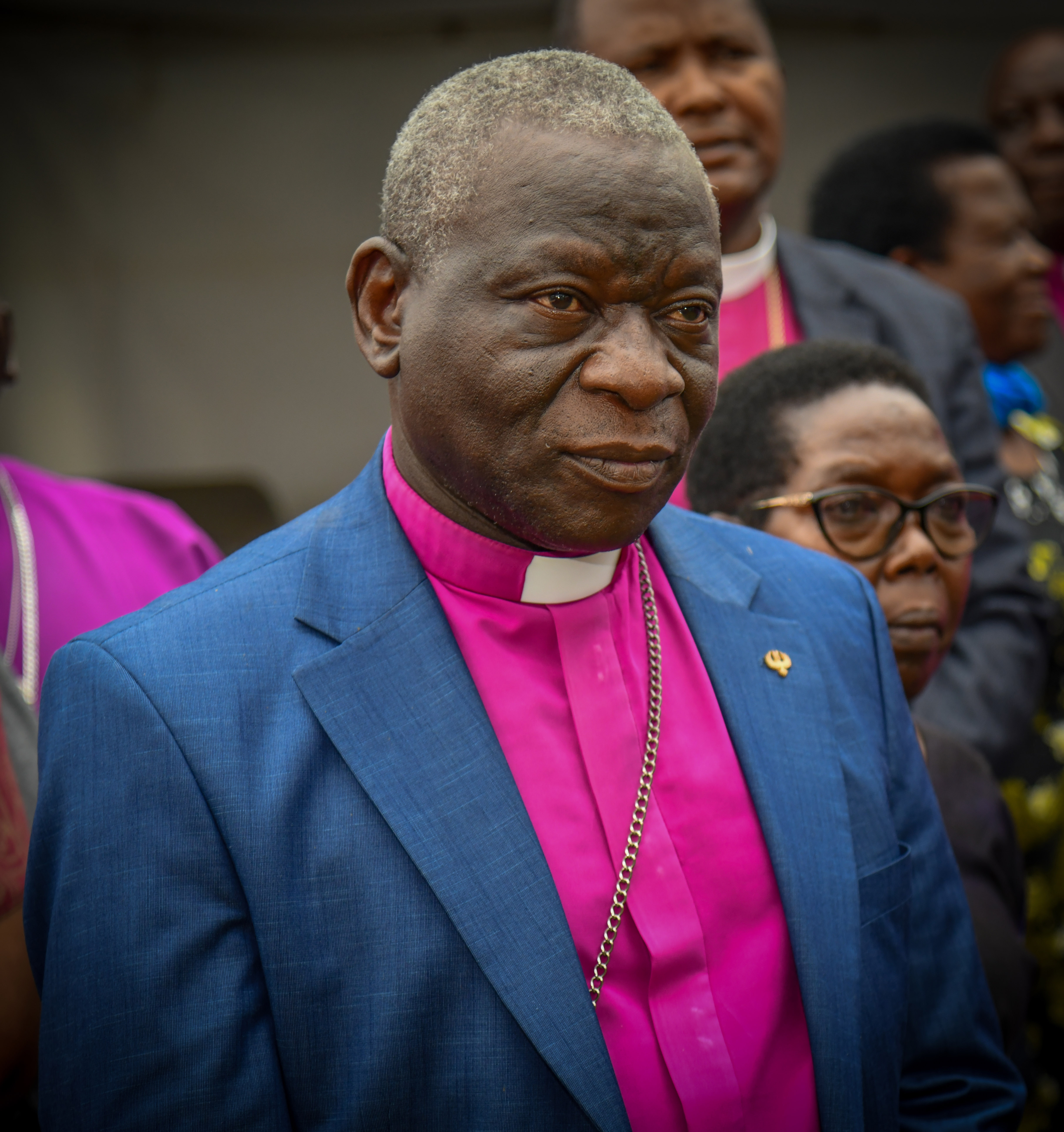
- Born: James Bukomeko; Luweero District
- Education: Uganda Christian University
- Occupation: Bishop
- Years active: 1996– present
- Title: Bishop

James Bukomeko (born 1968) is an Anglican bishop who serves in Uganda. In 2020, he became the fifth Bishop of Mityana.

== Early life and education ==
Bukomeko was born on November 1, 1968 in Luweero, and is the youngest of 12 children. He was educated at Uganda Christian University.He earned a Master's degree in Divinity from Uganda Christian University and a Post graduate Diploma in Humanresource Management from Uganda Management Institute and a Bachelor of Education and a Diploma in Education from Nkumba University. He also had an Executive Certificate from Heartfordshire University. He was given an honorary doctorate from London Bridge Business School. He served at Kireka, Namasuba, Kansanga, Namirembe, Maganjo and Nansana.

== Career ==
Bishop Bukomeko was ordained deacon and priest in 1994. He served in various capacities in Namirembe Diocese including parish priest and assistant vicar. He was consecrated and enthroned as Bishop on February 2, 2020 at St. Andrew's Cathedral. He was elected the 5th Bishop of Mityana diocese succeeding the Right Rev. Dr. Stephen Kazimba Mugalu who was elected ninth Archbishop of the Church of Uganda. The election was made by the House of Bishops of the Church of Uganda that sat at Namirembe Guest House on November 7, 2019.

== Marriage ==
He married Rose Bukomeko in 1996 with whom he has five children including twin girls.

== See also ==
- John Wasikye
- Akisoferi Wesonga
- Dunstan Bukenya
