= Mesusera Bugimbi =

Anglican bishop that serves in Uganda

Mesusera Bugimbi (died 13 August 2014) was an Anglican bishop in Uganda. He served as the inaugural Bishop of Luweero Diocese from 1991 to 1996.

== Early life and education ==
At the age of 72, Bishop Bugimbi married Margaret Nandagi Katumba in 2007 after the death of his first wife in 2001. He is also remembered by Christians as one who complained the establishment of Luweero diocese gest house, which project has been fulfilled by current bishop by bishop Evans Mukasa Kisseka.

== Bishop of Luweero ==
Bugimbi was appointed the first Bishop of Luweero in 1991, after the diocese was created to serve congregations in the central Buganda Region. He led the diocese through its formative years, established diocesan offices and helped to expand pastoral structures.

He retired from the episcopate in 1996, at which point Evans Mukasa Kisekka succeeded him as bishop of Luweero Diocese.

== Personal life ==
Bugimbi married Victoria Nantajja Bugimbi, who predeceased him in 2001. In 2007, at the age of 72, he married Margaret Nandagi Katumba in a ceremony at Namirembe Cathedral attended by fellow Anglican bishops and public figures.

== Death ==
Bugimbi died on 13 August 2014 at Mengo Hospital after a period of illness. He was 84 years old at the time of his passing. His funeral was held at St Mark's Cathedral, Luweero, and he was buried next to his first wife, Victoria. National leaders and church officials praised his contributions to the church of Uganda and to pastoral work in the Luweero Region.

== See also ==
- Church of Uganda
- Luweero Diocese
- Evans Mukasa Kisekka
