= Mutebi =

Mutebi is a surname. Notable people with the surname include:

- Hannington Mutebi, Ugandan bishop
- Mike Mutebi, Ugandan footballer
- Mutebi I of Buganda, King of Buganda
- Muwenda Mutebi II of Buganda (born 1955), King of Buganda
- Wilson Mutebi, Ugandan bishop
