= Leslie Brown (bishop) =

British Anglican bishop (1912–1999)

The Right Reverend Leslie Brown
- Archbishop of Uganda, Rwanda and Burundi
- Province: Province of Uganda, Rwanda and Burundi
- In office: 1961–1965
- Successor: Erica Sabiti
- Other posts: Bishop of Uganda/of Namirembe; 1953–1965; Assistant bishop in Oxford; 1965–1966; Bishop of St Edmundsbury and Ipswich (1966–1978)

Orders
- Consecration: c. 1953

Personal details
- Born: 10 June 1912
- Died: 27 December 1999 (aged 87)
- Denomination: Anglican
- Education: London College of Divinity

Leslie Wilfrid Brown CBE (10 June 1912 – 27 December 1999) was Bishop of Uganda then Bishop of Namirembe and Archbishop of Uganda, Rwanda and Burundi, before returning to the UK and later serving as Bishop of St Edmundsbury and Ipswich.

== Education and early career ==
Brown was educated at Enfield Grammar School before studying for ordination at the London College of Divinity. After a curacy at St James, Milton, Portsmouth he went out to the Diocese of Travancore and Cochin on the Malabar coast of India in January 1938, working there for the Church Missionary Society, and eventually becoming Principal of the Kerala United Theological Seminary.

== Episcopal ministry ==
In 1952 Brown accepted the post of Bishop of Uganda, despite having doubts because of his support for indigenisation. He was to serve as a bishop in total for 25 years, first as Bishop of Uganda (diocesan bishop of the Diocese of Uganda) until 1960, bridging the period of Ugandan independence, then as Archbishop of Uganda, Rwanda and Burundi, until his retirement effective 21 November 1965.

Upon the division of Uganda into separate dioceses in 1960, Brown remained in post, becoming diocesan bishop of a smaller diocese: the Bishop of Namirembe. On 7 November 1960, he was elected Archbishop of the new province, which was initially named the Province of Uganda and Rwanda-Urundi, but soon renamed the Province of Uganda, Rwanda and Burundi; he was installed archbishop at the province's inauguration service on 16 April 1961 at Namirembe Cathedral. The three national churches were later to become three separate provinces, but remained a single provincial unit throughout Brown's tenure.

On his return to England, Brown became first an assistant bishop in the Diocese of Oxford, and then in 1966 the Bishop of St Edmundsbury and Ipswich. He retired in 1978, and lived in retirement in Halesworth, serving as an honorary assistant priest in the local parish church.

== Academic interests ==
His lasting contribution is reckoned to be in the field of liturgy, first as a member of the liturgy committee of the Church of South India, which in 1950 produced the influential CSI Liturgy, then working on A Liturgy for Africa, produced in 1964, and also corresponding with the Church of England's Liturgical Commission. He further assisted in the development of A United Liturgy for East Africa, published in 1966. A noted author, his history The Indian Christians of St Thomas, was described at the time of his death as "a classic textbook".

Church of England titles
Preceded by Cyril Stuart	Bishop of Uganda; 1953–1960	Diocese split and renamed
Diocese split and renamed	Bishop of Namirembe; 1960–1965	Succeeded by Dunstan Nsubuga
New title	Archbishop of Uganda, Rwanda and Burundi; 1961–1965	Succeeded by Erica Sabiti
Preceded by Arthur Morris	Bishop of St Edmundsbury and Ipswich; 1966–1978	Succeeded by John Waine
