= St Andrew's Cathedral, Namukozi =

Cathedral in Uganda

- St Andrew's Cathedral, Namukozi
- 00°22′45″N 32°02′09″E
- Location: Namukozi, Uganda
- Country: Uganda
- Denomination: Anglican

History
- Status: Cathedral
- Dedication: Saint Andrew

Architecture
- Functional status: Active

Administration
- Province: Church of Uganda
- Diocese: Diocese of Mityana

Clergy
- Bishop: Stephen Kaziimba (Diocesan) [[[St Andrew's Cathedral, Namukozi]] "St Andrew's Cathedral, Namukozi"].

St Andrew's Cathedral, Namukozi is an Anglican cathedral in Uganda: the current diocesan is Stephen Kaziimba, Archbishop-designate of Uganda
