= Damalie Kisosonkole =

Uganda's first lady to Mutesa II (1929–2010)

- Born: Damalie Nakawombe Kisosonkole; 1929; Uganda
- Died: July 12, 2010 (aged 80–81); Nakasero Hospital, Kampala, Uganda
- Other name: Nabagereka Damalie
- Education: Buddo Junior School, King's College Budo, Shabon College (UK)
- Known for: First Lady of Uganda (1962–1966), Nabagereka of Buganda
- Spouse: Mutesa II of Buganda
- Children: Dorothy Nassolo Kabonesa, Henry Kalemeera
- Parent(s): CM Kisosonkole (father), Ham Mukasa (mother)

Damalie Kisosonkole also known as Damalie Nnakawombe Kisosonkole was born in 1929 to CM Kisosonkole who was the prime minister during Kabaka Daudi Chwaa monarch and mother being Ham Mukasa, the country chief of Kyaggwe. She was Uganda's first lady when Mutesa II served as the first president of Uganda between 1962 and 1966.

== Personal life ==
She was the first wife (Nabagereka) to Buganda, Kabaka Eward Mutesa II who died in 1969. Damalie later died at the age of 81 after a long illness on Monday July 12, 2010 at Nakasero Hospital. She was wedded to Mutesa II on Saturday November 19, 1948 at Namirembe Cathedral. She had varied history with Mengo hospital establishment. They first met at King's College Buddo where they were both studying before their marriage. She was survived by two children; Dorothy Nassolo Kabonesa who serves at Ministry of Health as the under secretary and Henry Kalemeera working with an airline company in the United Kingdom.

== Education ==
Damalie attended primary school at Buddo Junior School and later joined King's College Buddo and later joined Shabon College in Great Britain as the first African to this college.

== See also ==
- Mutesa II of Buganda
- Ronald Muwenda Mutebi II
