= Festo Lutaya =

Ugandan bishop

The Right Reverend Festo Lutaya
- Bishop of West Buganda
- Church: Anglican Church of Uganda
- Diocese: West Buganda
- In office: 1960–1965
- Predecessor: (first bishop, diocese erected 1960)
- Successor: Stephen Tomusange
- Previous posts: Assistant Bishop, Diocese of Uganda (from 1952)

Orders
- Ordination: Deacon: 1931 Priest: 1932

Personal details
- Denomination: Anglican
- Education: Uganda Christian University

Festo Lutaya was an Anglican bishop who served in Uganda.

Lutaya was educated at Uganda Christian University. He was ordained deacon in 1931 and priest in 1932. He served in the Diocese of Uganda and was its assistant bishop from 1952. He was Bishop of West Buganda from 1960 to 1965.
