= Aberi Balya =

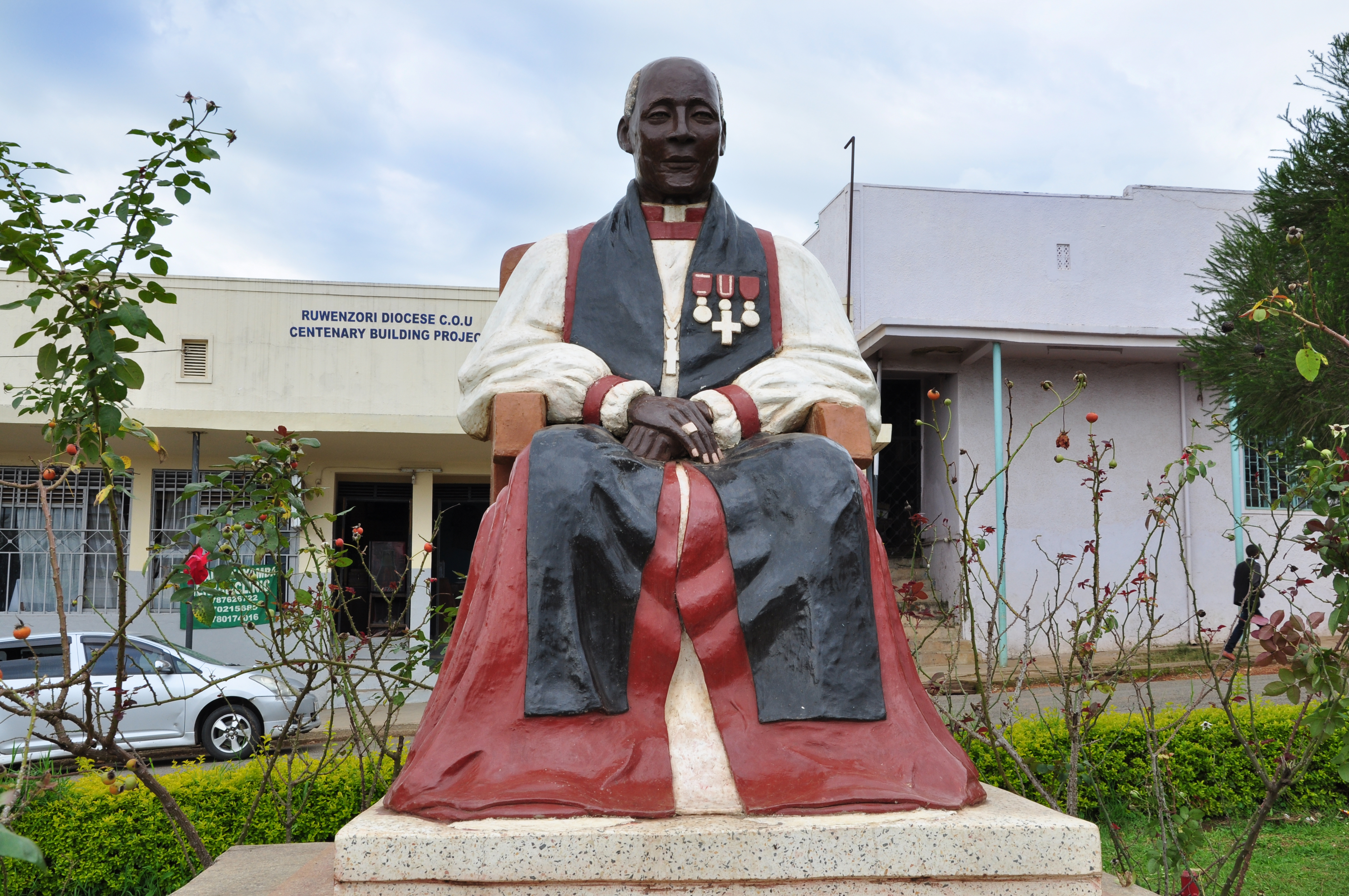
Statue of Aberi Balya

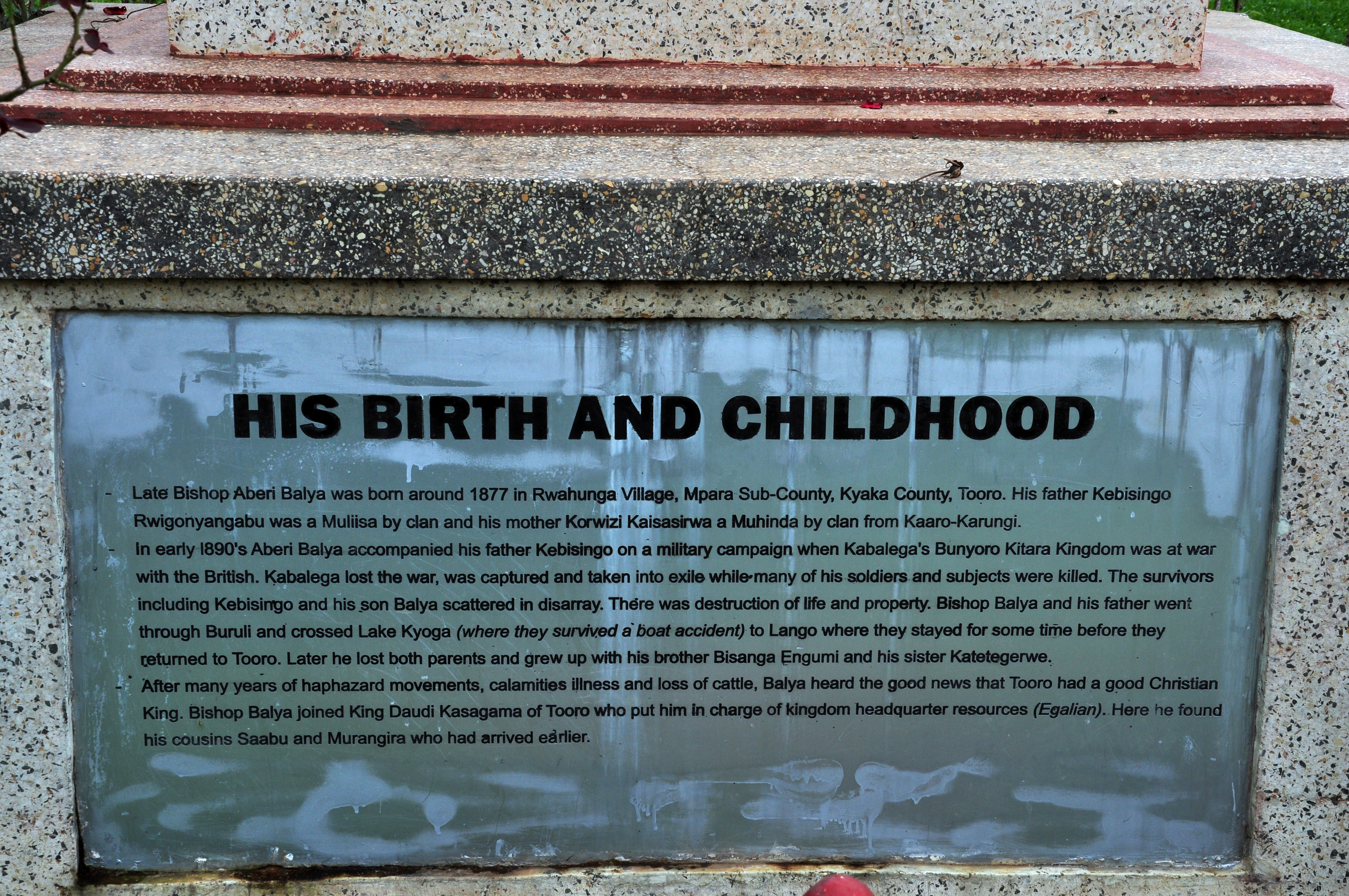
His birth and childhood

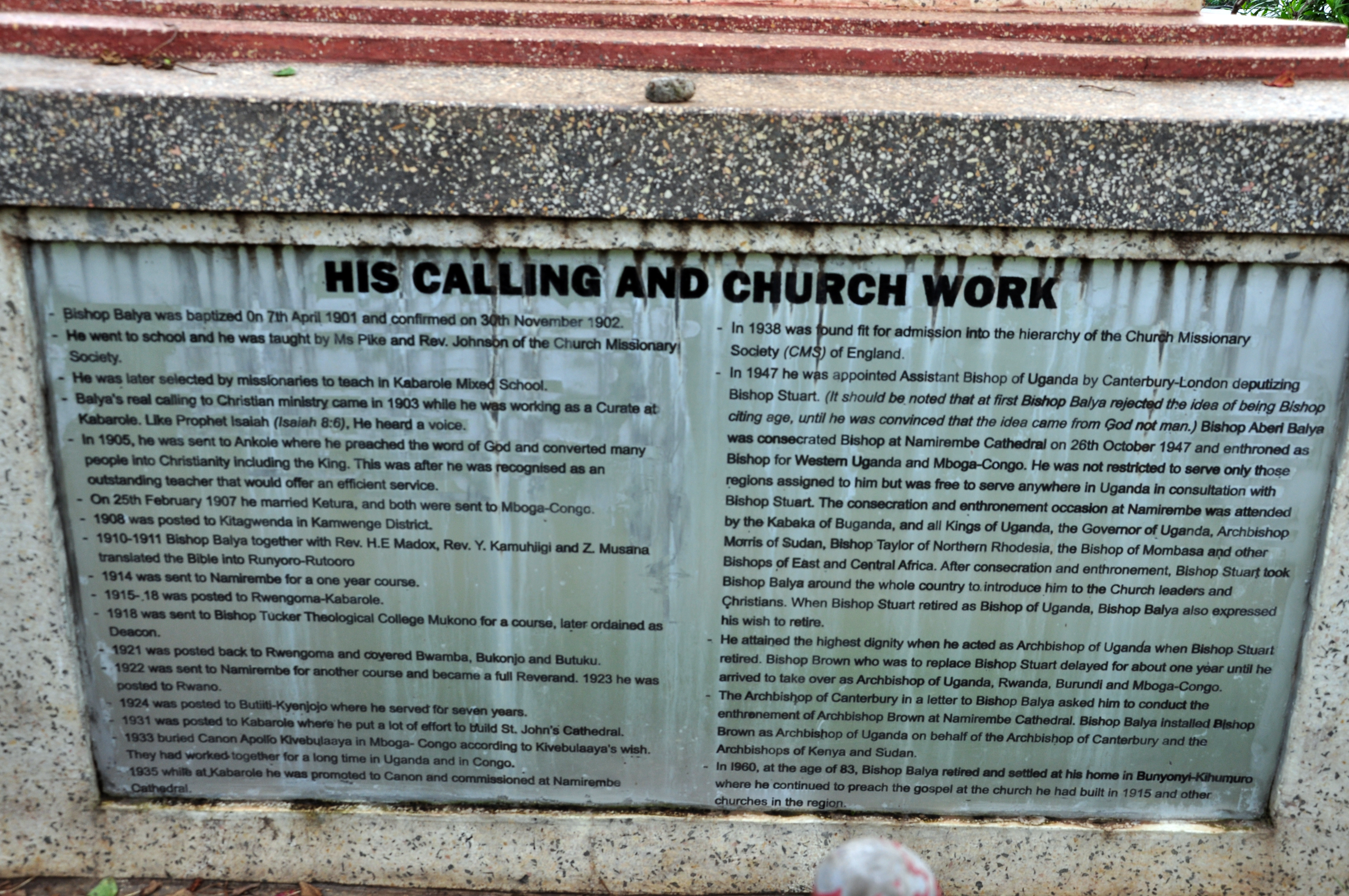
His calling and church work

Aberi Kakyomya Balya was an Anglican Assistant Bishop of Uganda in the mid 20th century.

He was educated at Bishop Tucker College and ordained in 1922. He was appointed a Canon in 1935; and consecrated in Kampala Cathedral on 26 October 1947, to serve as an Assistant Bishop of Uganda (i.e. an assistant bishop in the Diocese of Uganda). In that role, he had special responsibility for the areas of Bunyoro, Tooro, Ankole and Kigezi; he served until his retirement in 1960, aged 83. He died on November 26, 1979, reputedly aged 102.

Many institutions have been named in his honor including but not limited to Bishop Balya secondary School a single-sex girls' high school in Kamwenge District.
