= Dunstan Bukenya =

Dunstan Kopoliano Bukenya is a retired Anglican bishop in Uganda who served as the third Bishop of Mityana Diocese from 2002 to 2008.

== Early life and education ==
Bukenya was born on 17 October 1943 in Kyankwanzi District. He began his education at local primary schools before undertaking Bibles and theological studies at Bishop Tucker Theological College (now part of Uganda Christian University). He was ordained a deacon in 1969, beginning a long ministry in the Church of Uganda. In 1971, he married Phoebe Bukenya, and together they raised children and grandchildren. Bukenya continued his theological education, earning a Master of Divinity in the United States in 1979 and later a Doctor of Divinity.

== Bishop of Mityana ==
Dunstan Bukenya was consecrated as Bishop of Mityana Diocese in January 2002, succeeding Wilson Mutebi. He led the diocese through a period of consolidation, evangelism, and administrative development. During his tenure, Bukenya gained recognition for his pastoral leadership and contributions to theological education and community development. His contributions have also been recognised by Uganda Christian University, where the Dustan Bukenya Library at the school of Theology is named in his honour. He retired in 2008 and was succeeded by Stephen Samuel Kaziimba Mugalu as Bishop of Mityana.

== Later life ==
After retirement, Bukenya remained active in the church and community projects, including counselling services and educational initiatives. Together with his wife, he helped establish community programs in Kyampisi sub-county, Mukono District, and continued preaching and writing on Christian marriage and stewardship.

== See also ==
- Church of Uganda
- Diocese of Mityana
- List of Anglican bishops in Uganda
- Stephen Samuel Kaziimba Mugalu
