= All Saints' Cathedral, Kampala =

Anglican cathedral in Uganda

All Saints' Cathedral
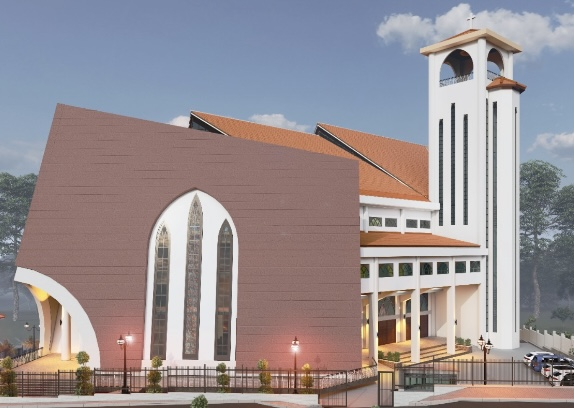
- The newly dedicated cathedral in 2025.
- All Saints' Cathedral
- 0.3212874671235027°N 32.579229114330936°E
- Location: Kampala
- Country: Uganda
- Denomination: Church of Uganda
- Website: allsaintskampala.org

History
- Dedicated: 1 November 2024

Specifications
- Capacity: 5,000

Administration
- Diocese: Kampala

Clergy
- Bishop: Stephen Kaziimba
- Dean: Rebecca Nyegenye

All Saints' Cathedral, also known as All Saints Church Kisozi, is an Anglican cathedral in Nakasero, Kampala, Uganda. It is the seat of the bishop of Kampala, who serves concurrently as the archbishop of Uganda. Initially built in the 1920s as a hospital chaplaincy serving expatriate Anglicans, the church grew substantially following Ugandan independence and was eventually named the cathedral of the diocese. In 2024, having far outgrown the 1920s building, a modern 5,000-seat cathedral.

== Location ==
The church is located in Kisozi village, Ksangi sub county council, Wakiso district below King's College Buddo. All Saints Church Kisozi was built on a land donated by Omutaka Mukamba Mika Sematimba to the church between 1920 and 1926.

== History ==
All Saints' Cathedral was founded in Kampala's Nakasero neighborhood as a chaplaincy to Kampala's colonial hospital in 1912, primarily serving expatriate European Anglicans. In 1962, after Ugandan independence, the church received parish status and membership began to include worshipers of African and Asian origins. In 1972, as the Church of Uganda continued to grow, All Saints' became the pro-cathedral of the Diocese of Kampala, which was formed out of the Diocese of Namirembe.

In 2019, Rebecca Nyegenye was installed by Archbishop Stanley Ntagali as the first female cathedral provost in the Church of Uganda.

== Construction of new cathedral ==
In the late 1990s, All Saints' congregation began to outpace its space; by 2011, it had 10,000 members for a church that could seat 800 and the cathedral accommodated overflow crowds in tents on the cathedral close.

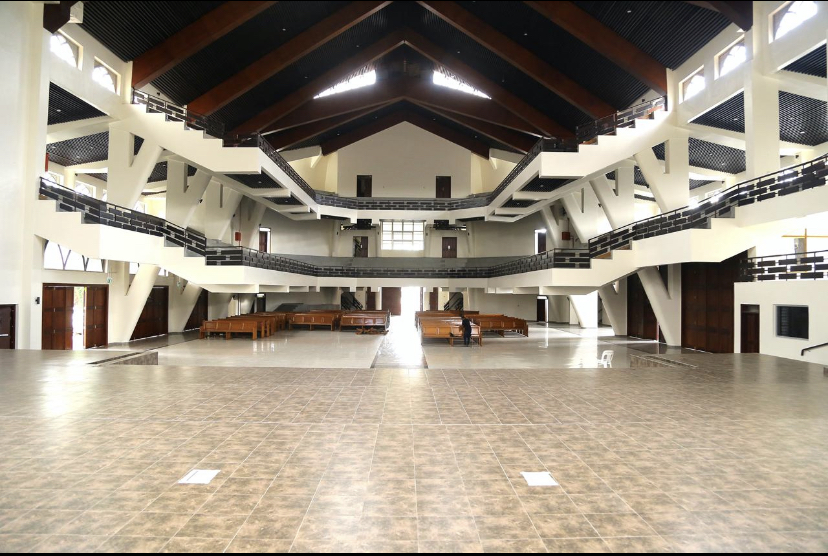
The interior of the new cathedral.

To accommodate future growth, church leaders began planning for a new cathedral building. In 2004, a committee was established, and by 2008, land across Lugard Road from the existing cathedral had been purchased. Plans were made for a post-modern six-sided cathedral building that would include a 45-meter bell tower echoing architectural features of the original cathedral costing £6.6 million. The new building is set to include seating for 5,000 in the nave plus four chapels. The cathedral will also include two galleries, a two-level underground garage, offices and meeting space. Construction proceeded slowly as funds were raised. Groundbreaking was done in 2009, and the foundation stone was laid in 2011. Construction slowed down during the COVID-19 pandemic. As of September 2023, the building's structure was largely complete, but exterior and interior finishes remained to be completed.

The cathedral was completed in 2024 and dedicated on All Saints Day, November 1, by Archbishop Stephen Kaziimba in the presence of Ugandan President Yoweri Museveni and minister of sport and education Janet Museveni. Kaziimba also consecrated Fredrick Jackson Baalwa as assistant bishop of Kampala and ordained several priests and deacons.
