= Hannington Mutebi =

Anglican bishop that serves in uganda

Hannington Mutebi (born 1968) is an Anglican bishop who serves in Uganda. since 2014 he has been Assistant Bishop of Kampala, And he retired on 31st December 2024.

He was appointed Chancellor of Ndejje University on December 17, 2021, at the 23rd Graduation Ceremony.

== Ecclesiastical career ==
In 1989, he was posted to St .Luke Kibuye as deacon. He was posted to Bunamwaya Church of Uganda between 1989 and 1991.Between 1992 and 1995, he served as Vicar of St. Paul cathedral Namirembe. He was posted as vicar at St. Stephen, Kisugu in 2005 before being appointed Archedeacon for south Archedeaconry of Kampala in 2008. In 2008, he went toTrinity School for Ministry Ambriedge Pennsylvania. Mutebi was in 2011, appointed as Provost and was posted to All Saints Cathederal Kampala.

Mutebi, who was enthroned on Saturday, November 10, 2013, replaced Bishop Zac Niringiye, who had retired the previous year as the new and fourth assistant bishop of Kampala Anglican Diocese. He was elected by the House of Bishops in August.

== Early life ==
Mutebi was born in 1968 and baptized. He studied in West Germany between 1983 and 1984.

== See also ==
- Amos Betungura
- Sheldon Mwesigwa
- Yona Okoth
