= Eridard Nsubuga =

Anglican bishop that serves in Uganda

The Right Reverend Eridard Kironde Nsubuga
- Bishop of Luweero
- Church: Church of Uganda
- Province: Anglican Communion
- Diocese: Diocese of Luweero
- Elected: 2015
- Installed: 17 May 2015
- Predecessor: Evans Mukasa Kisekka
- Previous posts: Provost of St. Mark’s Cathedral, Luweero; Archdeacon of Ndejje

Orders
- Consecration: 17 May 2015

Personal details
- Denomination: Anglicanism
- Education: University of Gloucestershire

Eridard Kironde Nsubuga is an Anglican bishop who serves in Uganda: he has been Bishop of Luweero since 2015.

Nsubuga was educated at the University of Gloucestershire. He has served in Gloucestershire and Luweero where he served as Provost of St. Mark's Cathedral, and Archdeacon of Ndejje. He was consecrated a bishop on 17 May 2015, at St Mark's Cathedral, Luweero.

== Personal life ==
Nsubuga is married to Jane Nagginda Nsubuga.
