= Erica Sabiti =

Leader of the Church of Uganda from 1966 to 1974

The Most Reverend Erica Sabiti
- Archbishop of Uganda, Rwanda, Burundi and Boga-Zaire
- Church: Anglican Communion
- Province: Church of Uganda
- Diocese: Kampala
- Elected: 1966
- In office: 1966–1974
- Predecessor: Leslie Brown
- Successor: Janani Luwum

Orders
- Ordination: 1933 (deacon); 1934 (priest)
- Consecration: 1960 (Bishop of Rwenzori)

Personal details
- Born: Erica Sabiti c. 1900s (exact year uncertain) Nkore (Ankole), Uganda
- Died: 15 May 1988 Kinoni, Uganda
- Denomination: Anglicanism
- Spouse: Georgina Kachandra (m. 1925; died 1925), Geraldine Sabiti (m. 1930)
- Children: 7
- Education: King's College Budo; Makerere College

Erica Sabiti was archbishop of Uganda, Rwanda, Burundi and Boga-Zaire from 1966 to 1974.

== Early life ==
Sabiti's year of birth is uncertain, but sources agree that he was born before 1908. He was born in Nkore (later known as Ankole) in today's South-Western Uganda and was educated at King's College Budo and Makerere College.

== Career ==
Sabiti taught in a primary school before being ordained deacon in 1933 and priest in 1934. After 26 years of serving the church in Uganda, he was consecrated Bishop of Rwenzori and Dean in 1960.

In 1966, he became the first Ugandan Archbishop.

He became the first bishop of Kampala in 1972 and served for two years until his retirement in 1974.

Sabiti died in Kinoni, Uganda, on May 15, 1988.

== Family ==
In 1925, he married Georgina Kachandra; she died the same year and he remarried in 1930.

He and his wife Geraldine had seven children.

Anglican Communion titles
Preceded by Leslie Brown (bishop) as Archbishop	Archbishop of Uganda and Bishop of Kampala as Archbishop; 1972–1974	Succeeded by Janani Luwum as Archbishop
