= Saints Andrew and Philip Cathedral, Mukono =

Ugandan Anglican cathedral

Coordinates: 00°21′36″N 32°45′00″E

Saints Andrew and Philip Cathedral, Mukono is an Anglican cathedral in Mukono District, in the Central Region of Uganda.The current Diocesan is The Rt. Rev. James Ssebaggala.
