= James Ssebaggala =

James William Ssebaggala is an Anglican bishop in Uganda. He served as the fourth bishop of Mukono from 2010 until his retirement in 2022, and subsequently continued to serve in the Church of Uganda, including as caretaker bishop of Luweero Diocese.

== Early life and education ==
Ssebaggala is a native of Mukono District. He trained professionally as an architect and land surveyor in Entebbe before pursuing ordination. He studied for the priesthood at Uganda Christian University and was ordained in 1984. In his early ministry, he served in various roles both in Uganda and abroad, including youth work and parish leadership in Germany and Zambia.

== Ministry ==
After ordination, Ssebaggala served the Church of Uganda in parish and diocesan capacities, including youth work, estates management, and diocesan secretarial roles before episcopal appointment. On 19 September 2010, he was consecrated as bishop of Mukono Diocese, succeeding Bishop Eria Paul Luzinda.

As bishop of Mukono, he oversaw the expansion of diocesan projects such as schools, synod halls and administrative infrastructure, strengthened church governance, and supported community development initiatives. In July 2023, following his retirement from Mukono Diocese, Archbishop Stephen Samuel Kaziimba Mugalu appointed Ssebaggala as caretaker bishop of Luweero Diocese to oversee the diocese during a transitional period.

== School reopening controversy ==
On 10 January 2022, the day that Ugandan schools reopened after nearly two years of closures due to the COVID-19 pandemic, Ssebaggala attracted national attention for directing teachers in Church of Uganda-founded schools to block pregnant and breastfeeding girls from returning to classes. This was in direct contradiction to the Ministry of Education guidelines on school reopening.

== Personal life ==
Ssebaggala is married to Tezirah Ssebaggala, whom he met through shared work and faith commitments. The couple married in 1991 and has four children: Joanne, Joy, Jonathan, and Juliet.
