= Henry Luke Orombi =

Ugandan Anglican bishop (born 1949)

The Most Reverend Henry Luke Orombi
- Archbishop of Uganda and Bishop of Kampala
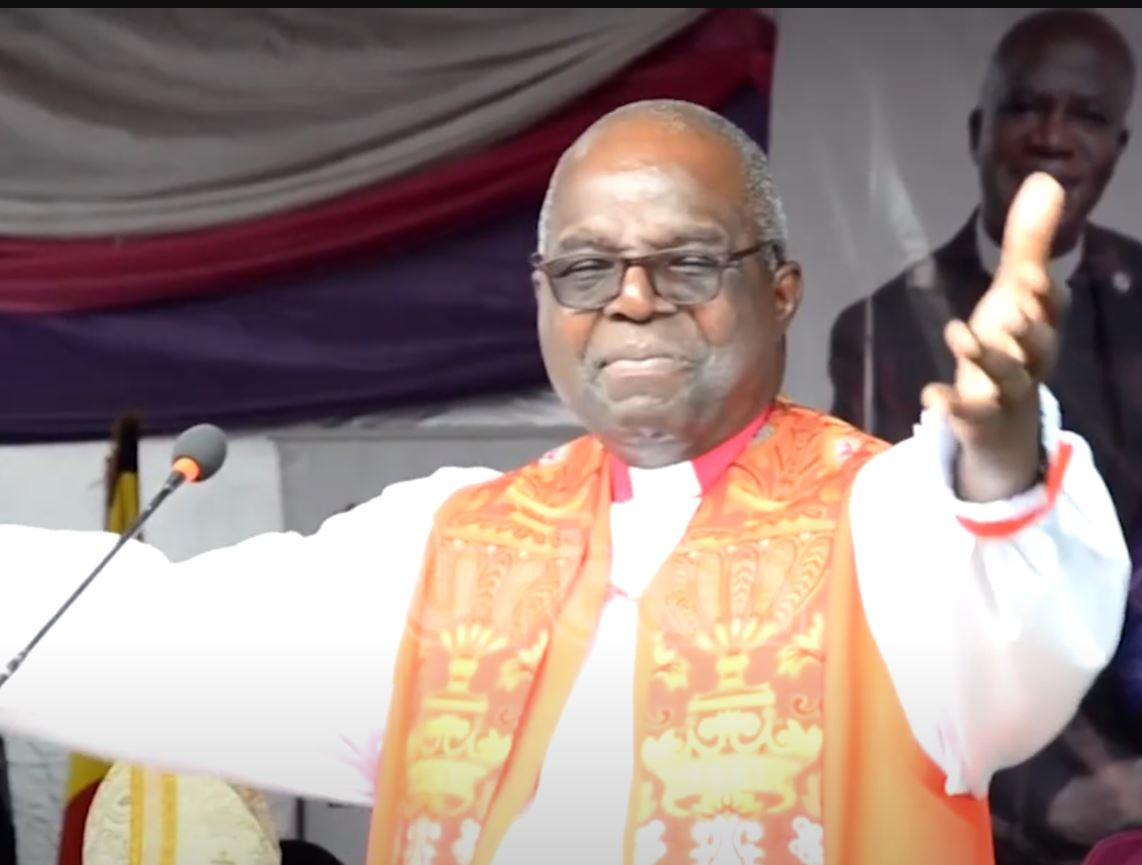
- Church: Church of Uganda
- Diocese: Kampala
- Installed: 24 January 2004
- Term ended: 16 December 2012
- Predecessor: Livingstone Mpalanyi Nkoyoyo
- Successor: Stanley Ntagali
- Other posts: Bishop of Nebbi (1993–2003); Archdeacon of Nebbi (1987–1993)

Orders
- Ordination: 1979 (priest)
- Consecration: c. 1993

Personal details
- Born: 11 October 1949 (age 77) Uganda
- Denomination: Anglicanism
- Spouse: Phoebe Orombi (m. 1972)
- Education: Bishop Tucker Theological College; St John's College, Nottingham

Henry Luke Orombi (born 11 October 1949) in Pakwach, North Western Uganda, is a Ugandan Anglican bishop. He served as Archbishop of Uganda and Bishop of Kampala from 2004 until his retirement in December 2012, two years earlier than expected. He was succeeded as Archbishop by Stanley Ntagali, who was consecrated in December 2012. Orombi served as Bishop of the Diocese of Kampala, which is the fixed episcopal see of the Archbishop, but unlike many other fixed metropolitical sees, the incumbent is not officially known as "Archbishop of Kampala", but bears the longer compound title "Archbishop of Uganda and Bishop of Kampala".

== Background ==
Orombi was educated at Bishop Tucker Theological College, which today is known as Uganda Christian University, in Mukono, Uganda, where he received a Diploma in Theology, and St John's College, Nottingham, in England, where he attained a Bachelor of Divinity degree. Before becoming Archbishop, he was Diocesan Youth Officer in Moyo District and Adjumani District in West Nile sub-region from 1979 until 1986. He then served as Archdeacon at Goli in Nebbi District from 1987 until 1993. From 1993 until 2003, he served as the Bishop of Nebbi Diocese. During this tenure, he focused on church growth, evagelism, clergy training, and social outreach. He supported initiatives in education and health services within the diocese.

== Overview ==
He has become an influential leader of the Global South during the recent discussions within the Anglican Communion. Together with the House of Bishops of the Church of Uganda, Archbishop Orombi consecrated an American priest as a bishop to provide ecclesiastical oversight to the American congregations under the Church of Uganda. The Church of Uganda transferred all its American clergy and congregations to the Anglican Church in North America in June 2009. Orombi, the Church of Uganda, and their American clergy and congregations oppose decisions made by the governing bodies of the Episcopal Church.

== Views ==
Anglicans entering the Roman Catholic Church

In October 2009, he responded to the Vatican's proposed creation of personal ordinariates for disaffected traditionalist Anglicans by saying that the current GAFCON structures already meet the spiritual and pastoral needs of traditionalist Anglicans in Africa.

== Homosexuality in Africa ==
The Church of Uganda has opposed the proposed Anti-Homosexuality Bill because of the imposition of the death penalty. The Church of Uganda supported a later version of the Anti-Homosexuality Bill that only had a life imprisonment as punishment. Archbishop Orombi and the House of Bishops resolved in August 2008, that "The Church of Uganda is committed at all levels to offer counseling, healing and prayer for people with homosexual disorientation, especially in our schools and other institutions of learning. The Church is a safe place for individuals, who are confused about their sexuality or struggling with sexual brokenness, to seek help and healing."

== Retirement and later life ==
After retiring in 2012, Orombi remained active in church and community affairs, participating in conferences, mentoring clergy and supporting reconciliation and development initiatives within Uganda. He was succeeded by Stanley Ntagali.

== Personal life ==
Henry Luke Orombi is married and has children. He is known for his evangelical preaching style and commitment to church growth and leadership development.

== See also ==
- Church of Uganda
- Anglican Communion
- Anglican Church in North American
- Global Anglican Future Conference(GAFCON)
- List of Archbishops of Uganda

Anglican Communion titles
Preceded by Livingstone Mpalanyi Nkoyoyo as Archbishop	Archbishop of Uganda and Bishop of Kampala as Archbishop; 24 January 2004 – 16 December 2012	Succeeded by Stanley Ntagali as Archbishop
