= Evans Mukasa =

Anglican bishop that serves in uganda

Evans Mukasa Kisekka (or Kiseka; born 1940) was an Anglican bishop who served in Uganda: he was Bishop of Luweero from 1996 to 2015.
