= Stanley Ntagali =

Ugandan Anglican bishop (born 1955)

The Most Reverend Stanley Ntagali
- Archbishop of Uganda, Bishop of Kampala
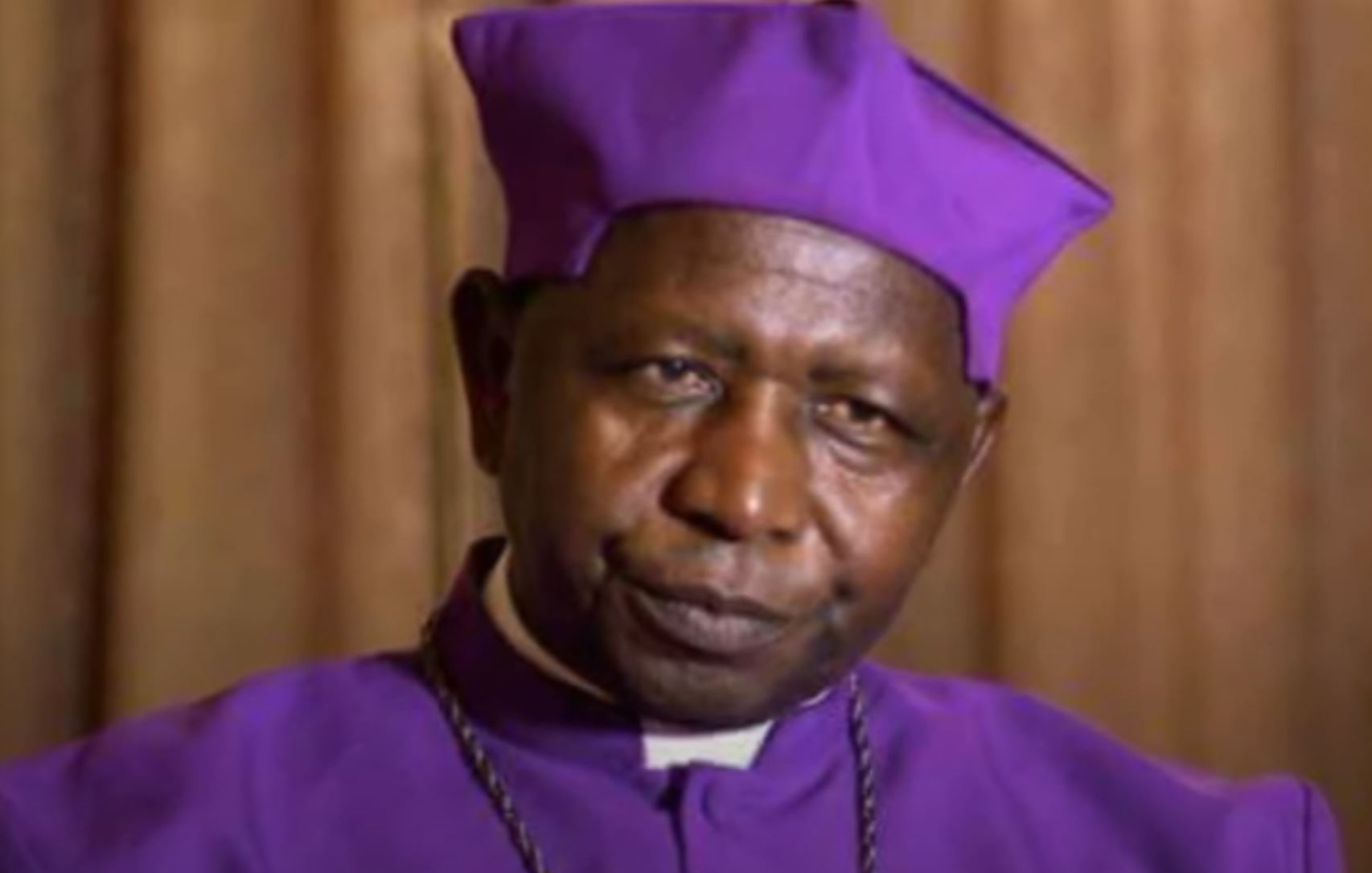
- Church: Church of Uganda
- Diocese: Diocese of Kampala
- Elected: 22 June 2011
- Installed: 16 December 2012
- Term ended: 1 March 2020
- Predecessor: Henry Luke Orombi
- Successor: Samuel Kazimba Mugalu
- Other post: Bishop of Masindi-Kitara (2004–2012)

Orders
- Ordination: 1981
- Consecration: 19 December 2004 by Henry Luke Orombi
- Rank: Bishop of Masindi-Kitara (2004–2012)

Personal details
- Born: 1 March 1955 (age 71) Kigezi District, Uganda
- Education: Bishop Tucker Theological College; St. Paul's University, Limuru; Oxford Centre for Mission Studies

Stanley Ntagali (born 1 March 1955) is a Ugandan bishop of the Anglican Church who served as former chancellor of Uganda Christian University and former archbishop of Uganda and bishop of Kampala from 2012 to 2020. He also served as Bishop of Masindi-Kitara from 2004 to 2012. He is currently serving as an Anglican bishop in Uganda.

== Early life and education ==
Ntagali was born in Kabale, Uganda, to Ernest and Molly Ntagali. At age 16, he and his family migrated to the Hoima District.

Ntagali studied theology and trained for ordained ministry at Bishop Tucker Theological College, an Anglican seminary, graduating with a certificate in theology in 1981. He continued his studies after ordination, completing a Bachelor of Divinity degree from St. Paul's University, Limuru in Kenya and a Master of Arts degree in theology and development from the Oxford Centre for Mission Studies (associated with Middlesex University) in 2000.

== Ordained ministry ==
In 1981, Ntagali was ordained in the Church of Uganda. He was a missionary in Karamoja until 1986. He then served as a parish priest in the Diocese of Bunyoro-Kitara until 2002. He was Archdeacon of Masindi from 1994 to 1999, Diocesan Secretary of Bunyoro-Kitara from 2000 to 2002, and Provincial Secretary for the Church of Uganda from 2003 to 2004.

=== Episcopal ministry ===
On 19 December 2004, Ntagali was consecrated as a bishop for the newly created Diocese of Masindi-Kitara by Archbishop Henry Orombi. Ntagali was the first bishop consecrated by Orombi.

Ntagali was elected to be the next archbishop of Uganda by a secret ballot by all the 34 bishops of the Church of Uganda on 22 June 2011. He was installed as archbishop on 16 December 2012 at St. Paul's Cathedral at Namirembe. In addition to serving as the Archbishop of Uganda, Ntagali serves as bishop of the Diocese of Kampala, which is the episcopal see of the archbishop. His official position is Archbishop of Uganda and Bishop of Kampala.

On 1 March 2020, having attained the retirement age of 65 years, Ntagali resigned and was replaced by Stephen Kaziimba, who was elected on 28 August 2019, as the 9th Archbishop of Uganda.

=== Views ===
Ntagali supports the ordination of women as priests and bishops. He was a strong supporter of the abandoned Anti-Homosexuality Act, 2014, and has since supported the introduction of the Ugandan Anti-Homosexuality Act, which introduces the death penalty for certain cases.

== Personal life ==
In 1978, Ntagali married Beatrice. Together, they have four sons and one daughter.

== Suspension ==
In January 2021, Ntagali's successor as primate, Stephen Kaziimba, suspended Ntagali from ordained ministry for being "involved in an extra-marital affair with a married woman, which he has acknowledged." Ntagali confessed and publicly asked for forgiveness at an April 2021 event celebrating the 60th anniversary of Church of Uganda independence.

== See also ==
- Uganda Christian University
- Nakasero
- Church House, Uganda
- List of university leaders in Uganda

Anglican Communion titles
New title	Bishop of Masindi-Kitara; 2004–2012	Succeeded by George Kasangaki
Preceded by Henry Luke Orombi	Archbishop of Uganda; Bishop of Kampala; Chancellor of Uganda Christian University; 2012–2020	Succeeded by Stephen Kaziimba
