= Stephen Kaziimba =

Ugandan bishop

The Most Reverend Stephen Kaziimba
- Archbishop of Uganda; Bishop of Kampala
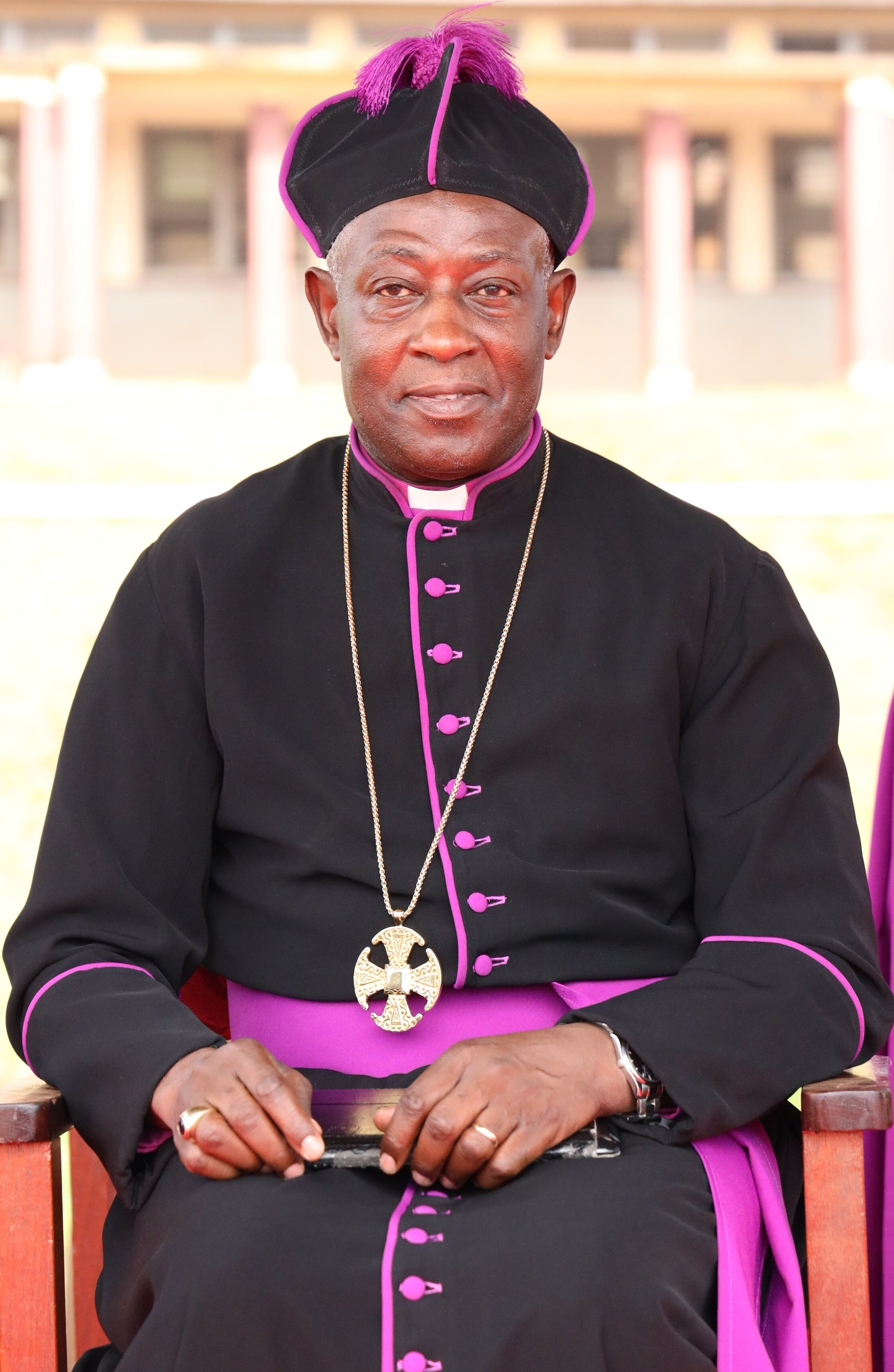
- Kaziimba in 2025
- Church: Church of Uganda
- Diocese: Diocese of Kampala
- Elected: 28 August 2019
- Installed: 1 March 2020
- Predecessor: Stanley Ntagali
- Other post: Bishop of Mityana (2009–2020)

Orders
- Ordination: December 1990 by Livingstone Mpalanyi Nkoyoyo
- Consecration: 26 October 2008

Personal details
- Born: 15 August 1962 (age 64) Buikwe District, Uganda
- Spouse: Margaret Naggayi Bulya
- Education: Bishop Tucker Theological College, Western Theological Seminary

Stephen Samuel Kaziimba Mugalu (Stephen Kaziimba; also spelled Kazimba; born 15 August 1962) is a Ugandan Anglican bishop. On 28 August 2019, he was elected to serve as the ninth Archbishop of Uganda and Bishop of Kampala, effective 1 March 2020. In his capacity as Archbishop of Uganda, he is the head of the Church of Uganda. Prior to his new position, he served as the Anglican Bishop of the Diocese of Mityana, from 2009 until 2020.

== Early life and education ==
Mugalu was born on 15 August 1962, to Jessica Nanyonjo and Besweri Kaddu, at Gulama-Najja Village, Kyaggwe County, in present-day Buikwe District.

He attended Gakuweebwa Munno Nursery School and then Lusaka Primary School, in Katwe, a neighborhood in Kampala, Uganda's capital city. He was baptised by Canon Y. Baddokwaya, on 22 April 1973, at St. Luke's Church Kibuye. He was confirmed by Bishop Misaeri Kawuma, on 22 September 1979, at Namataba, Kyaggwe County, in present-day Mukono District.

He received a Master of Theology degree in 2003 and a Doctor of Ministry degree in 2007, both from Western Theological Seminary in Holland, Michigan.

== Ordained ministry ==
Kaziimba was ordained in December 1990 by Bishop Livingstone Mpalanyi Nkoyoyo. He served as Assistant Vicar at Nakibizzi Parish, Buikwe District, from 1990 to 1994. He then served as parish priest at Katente Parish from 1997 to 2000. From 2000, he was the Vicar of Mukono Cathedral. While there, Bishop Michael Ssenyimba made him Acting Provost of Mukono Cathedral. He was confirmed as the Provost of St. Philip and Andrew‘s Cathedral Mukono, in 2004.

== Episcopal ministry ==
Kaziimba was consecrated as a bishop and was installed as 4th Bishop of Mityana Diocese, on 26 October 2008 replacing Bishop Dr. Dunstan Kopriano Bukenya.

He was elected to be the next Archbishop of Uganda by a secret ballot, with more than a two thirds majority of the bishops of the Church of Uganda on 28 August 2019. He was installed as Archbishop on 1 March 2020 at St. Paul's Cathedral at Namirembe.

He replaced Bishop Stanley Ntagali, who retired, having attained the retirement age of 65 years.

== Anti homosexuality stance ==
In 2023, Kaziimba expressed support for the Ugandan Anti-Homosexuality Act, which introduces the death penalty for certain convictions of homosexuals. Kaziimba disputed criticism of his stance by the Archbishop of Canterbury, Justin Welby, noting that laws criminalising homosexual acts had first been introduced to Uganda by the British in colonial times. He has, however, stated that he does not support the use of capital punishment. In July, 2023, Kaziimba met with and offered support for the positions of the Iranian President, Ebrahim Raisi, and both reiterated their support for criminalising homosexuality.

== Other responsibilities ==
On 20 March 2020, Archbishop Stephen Kaziimba was installed as the 4th Chancellor of Uganda Christian University, a private Christian university affiliated with the Church of Uganda.

== Personal life ==
He is married to Margaret Naggayi Bulya and together are the parents of four sons.

== See also ==
- Uganda Christian University
- Church House, Uganda

Anglican Communion titles
Preceded by Dunstan Bukenya	Bishop of Mityana; 2008–2020	Succeeded by James Bukomeko
Preceded by Stanley Ntagali	Archbishop of Uganda; Bishop of Kampala; Chancellor of Uganda Christian University; 2020–present	Incumbent
