= St Mark's Cathedral, Luweero =

Anglican cathedral in Uganda

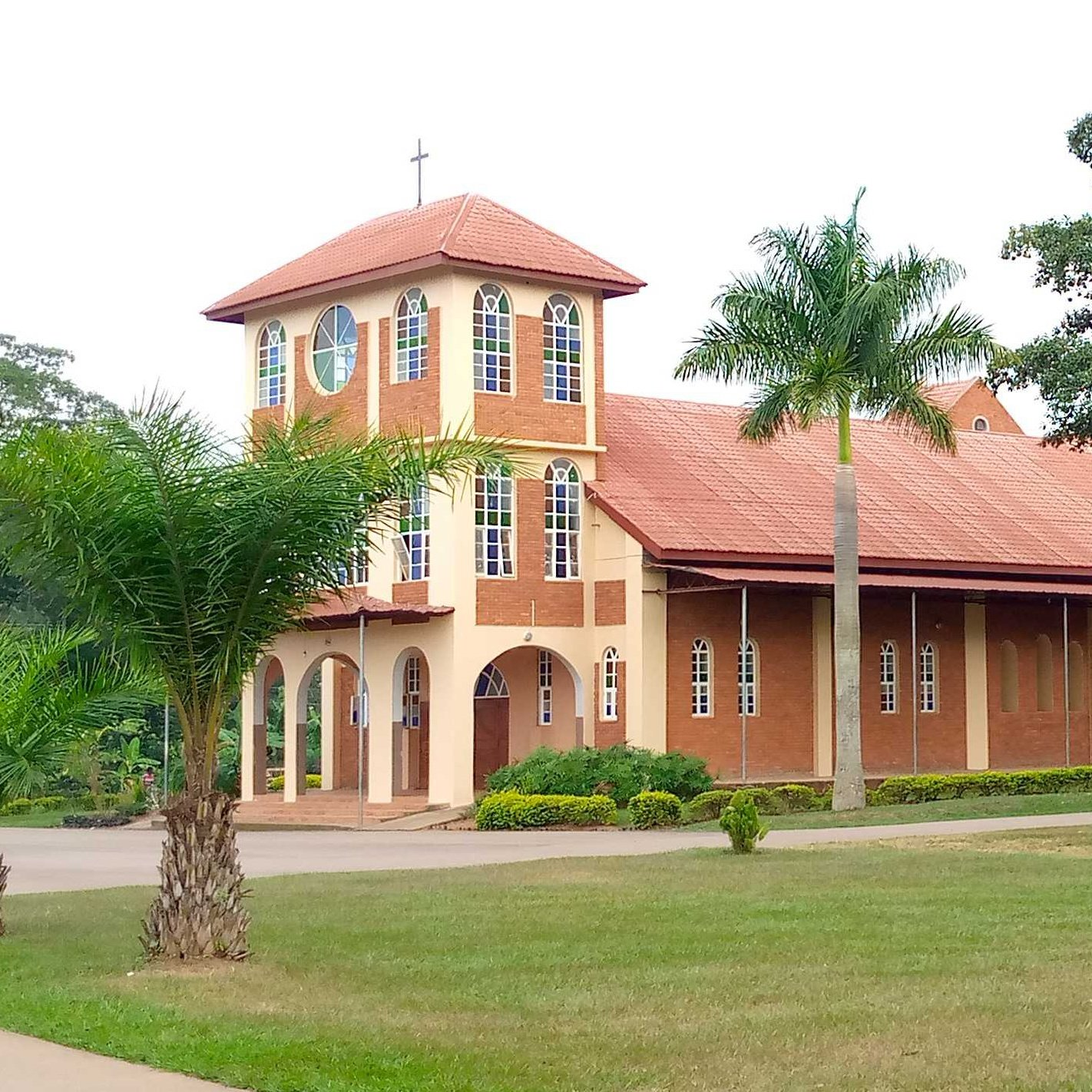
- St Mark’s Cathedral, Luweero

- Location in Uganda

Religion
- Ecclesiastical or organizational status: Cathedral
- Status: Active

Location
- Location: Luweero, Central Region, Uganda
- Country: Uganda
- Interactive map of St Mark's Cathedral, Luweero
- Coordinates: 0°49′59″N 32°29′58″E

St Mark's Cathedral, Luweero is a cathedral of the Church of Uganda (Anglican) in Luweero, Central Region, Uganda. It is the seat of the bishop of Luweero, currently Eridard Kironde Nsubuga.
