= Namirembe Cathedral =

Anglican church in Kampala, Uganda

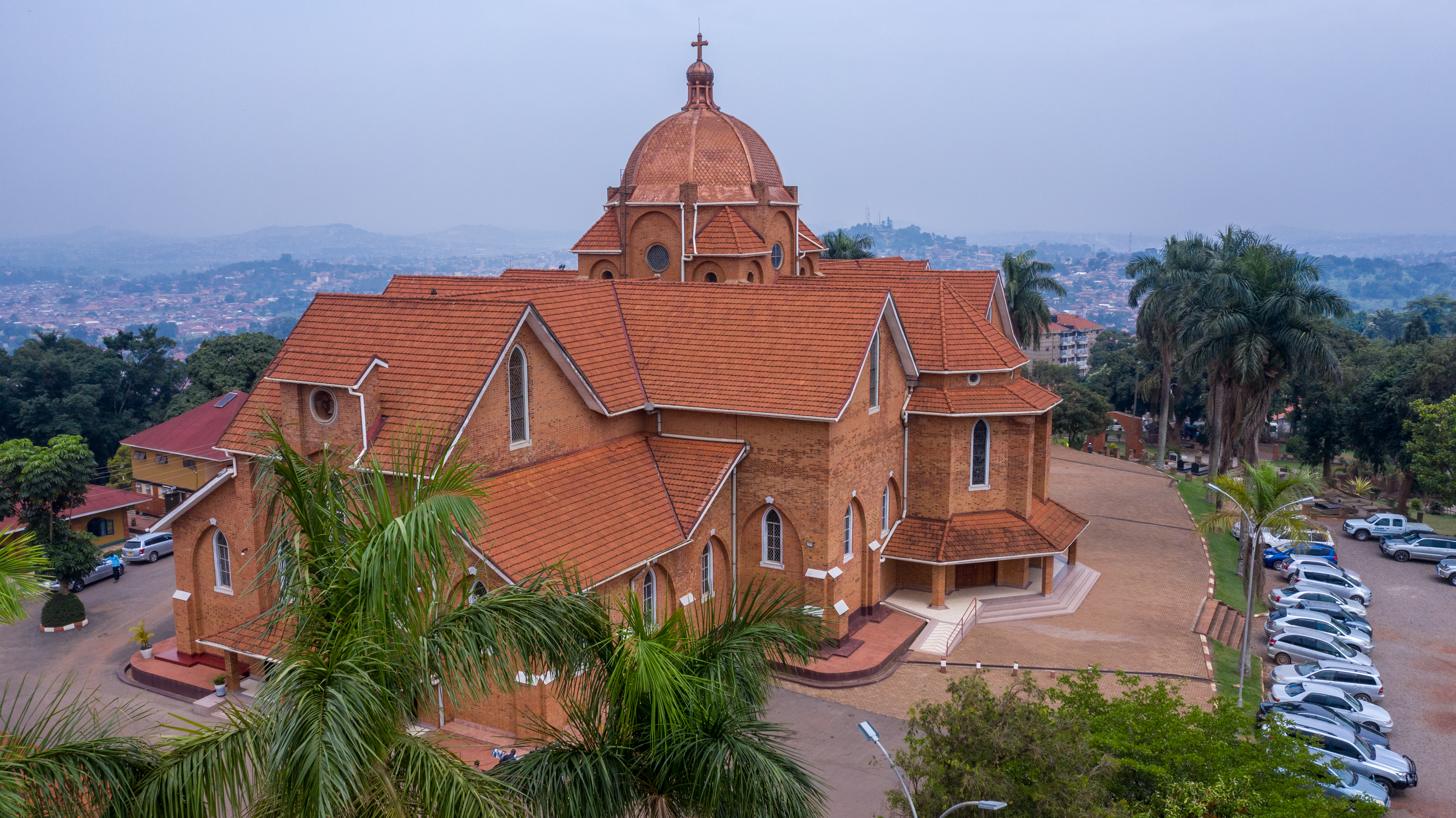
- Aerial View of Namirembe Cathedral in Uganda (2022)

Religion
- Affiliation: Anglican Communion
- District: Kampala, Uganda
- Ecclesiastical or organisational status: Major cathedral
- Leadership: Bishop - The Rt. Rev. Moses Banja; Dean – The Very Rev. Canon Jonathan Kisawuzi Ssalongo; Vicar - Rev. George William Kyeyune; Asst. Vicar - Rev. Keziah Nakazzi; Curate - Rev. Samuel Muwonge
- Year consecrated: 1919

Location
- Location: Namirembe, Kampala, Uganda
- Interactive map of Namirembe Cathedral
- Coordinates: 0°18′54″N 32°33′35″E

Architecture
- Groundbreaking: 1915
- Completed: 1919

Website
- https://namirembecathedral.org/

Saint Paul's Cathedral Namirembe, commonly and locally (Uganda) referred to as Namirembe Cathedral, is the oldest Anglican cathedral in Uganda. It serves as the provincial cathedral of the Anglican Church of Uganda and the diocesan cathedral for Namirembe Diocese, the first diocese to be founded in the Church of Uganda province in 1890. Between 1919 and 1967, the Cathedral served as the provincial cathedral of the Church of Uganda, Anglican Communion. In the 1960s, the headquarters of the Church of Uganda moved to All Saints Church in Nakasero then moved back to Namirembe later.

== Location ==
The cathedral is located on Namirembe Hill, in Lubaga Division, in Kampala, the capital and largest city in Uganda. Namirembe is located approximately 2 kilometres (1.2 mi), by road, west of Kampala's central business district. The coordinates of Namirembe Cathedral are: 0°18'54.0"N, 32°33'35.0"E (Latitude: 0.315000; Longitude: 32.559710).

== History ==
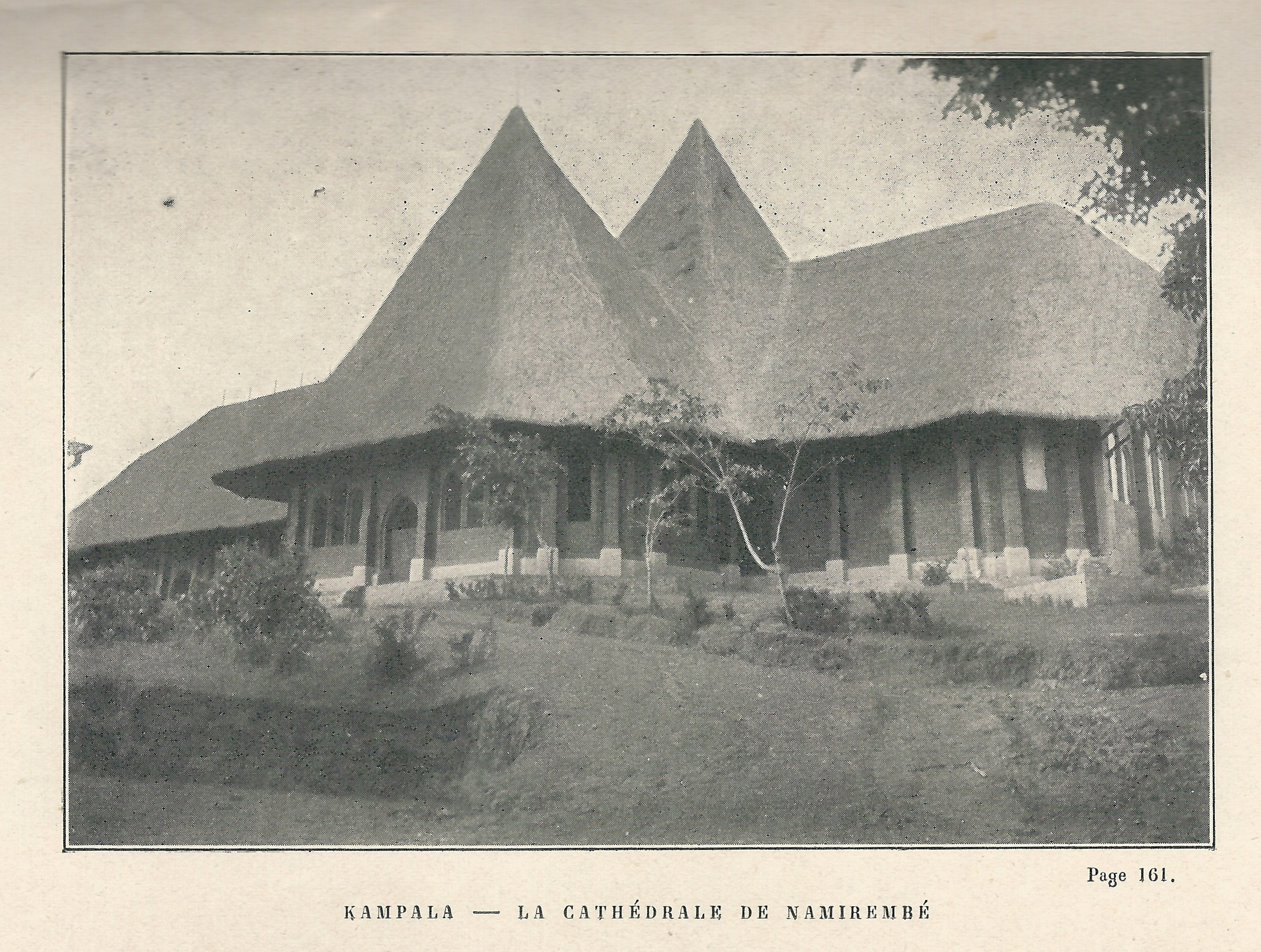
The fourth church building in 1913

Namirembe Hill has been the location of the main Anglican place of worship in Buganda since Bishop Alfred Tucker established the offices of the Diocese of Eastern Equatorial Africa in 1890. Tragedy befell the first four church structures: The first church building, constructed in 1890 at a place called Kitesa, with a capacity of 800 people, was abandoned in 1891 because it was located in a swampy area at the base of Namirembe Hill. Also, a bigger building was needed to accommodate the ever-growing congregation.

The second church building was constructed between July 1891 and July 1892, with a seating capacity of more than 3,000. In October 1894, strong winds during a thunderstorm blew the roof off the church and it was ruined.

The third church building was built between 1894 and 1895. It had a seating capacity of about 4,000 worshippers. That building, constructed with traditional African materials, was abandoned in the early 1900s due to fear that termites would destroy it.

The fourth church building was constructed with earthen brick walls and a thatched roof, between 1900 and 1904. At the opening ceremony, on 21 June 1904, an estimated 10,000 people were in attendance. The congregation included Kabaka Daudi Chwa II, then aged seven years. On the afternoon of 23 September 1910, the roof was gutted by a fire which started when lightning struck the building. Within less than thirty minutes, the entire roof was destroyed and the church was ruined.

The current St Paul's Cathedral was constructed between 1915 and 1919 using earthen bricks and earthen roof tiles. The cathedral is still standing, but needs repairs from time to time. The building is one of the National Cultural Sites of Uganda (id: UG-C-022).

== Organ ==
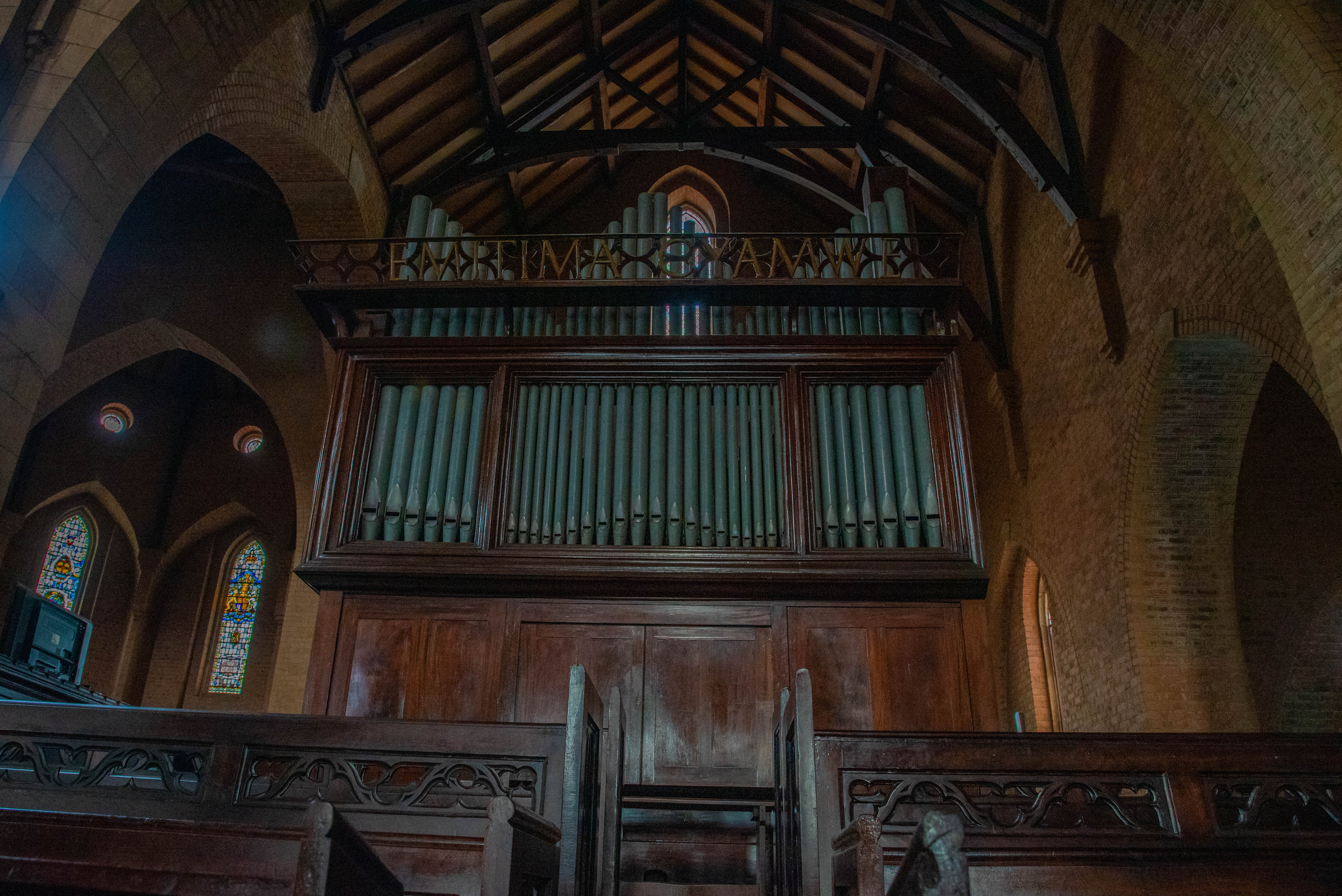
The organ

The organ was built in 1931 by the Positive Organ Company (1922) Limited. In 1952, after twenty years of service the organ was in need of an overhaul and this work was entrusted to Alfred E. Davis of Northampton, England. The organ gave a further twenty years of service, but after Idi Amin seized power in 1971 it deteriorated seriously during the years of unrest. Eventually in 1998, Peter Wells from the United Kingdom was sent to inspect what remained and advise on the rehabilitation. Several schemes were considered and the organ today operates to a specification drawn up with Michael Sozi, then chairman of the Organ Committee, in 1999.

Due to limited funds, it was decided to stagger the work of restoration. The first phase commenced after Easter 1999 when Peter and Ann Wells travelled to Uganda to install new manual keyboards and action to the manual soundboards. The full scheme was realized in 2006 and 2007 with the installation of the Great Mixture and Pedal Trombone.

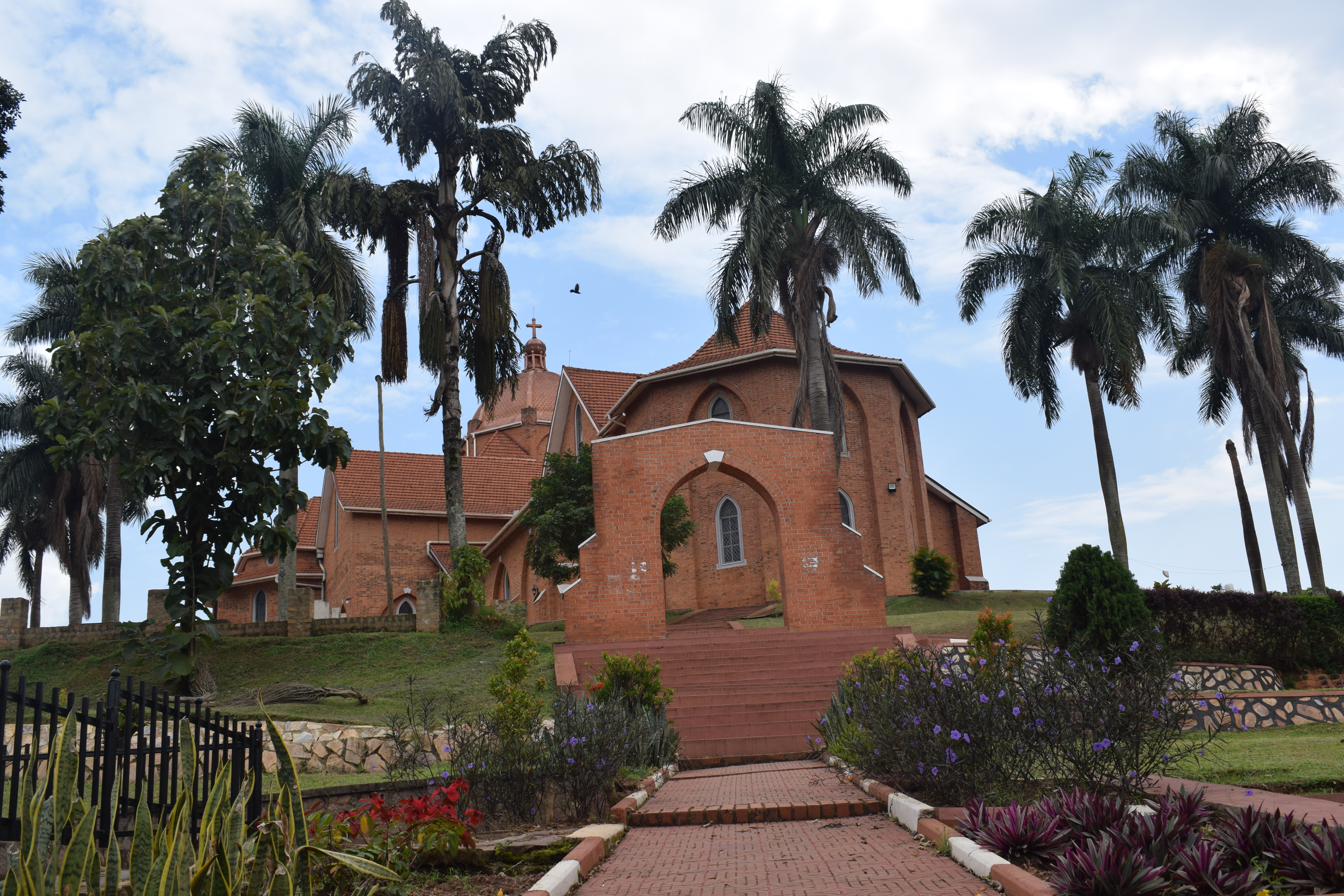
View from the lower isle

== Notable events ==
On 16 December 2012, the cathedral hosted the enthronement of the Most Reverend Stanley Ntagali, as the 8th Archbishop of Uganda. The ceremony was attended by an estimated 3,000 people, including Robert Duncan, Archbishop of the Anglican Church in North America and John Sentamu, the Archbishop of York in the United Kingdom. Other attendees included Archbishops from Burundi, England, the Indian Ocean, Kenya, the Middle East, Nigeria, Rwanda, Scotland and Sudan. Yoweri Museveni, the President of Uganda, was also in attendance.

On 27 August 1999, Namirembe cathedral was the venue for the wedding of Kabaka Ronald Muwenda Mutebi II to Lady Sylvia Nagginda which was presided over by then-Arch Bishop Mpalanyi Nkoyooyo.

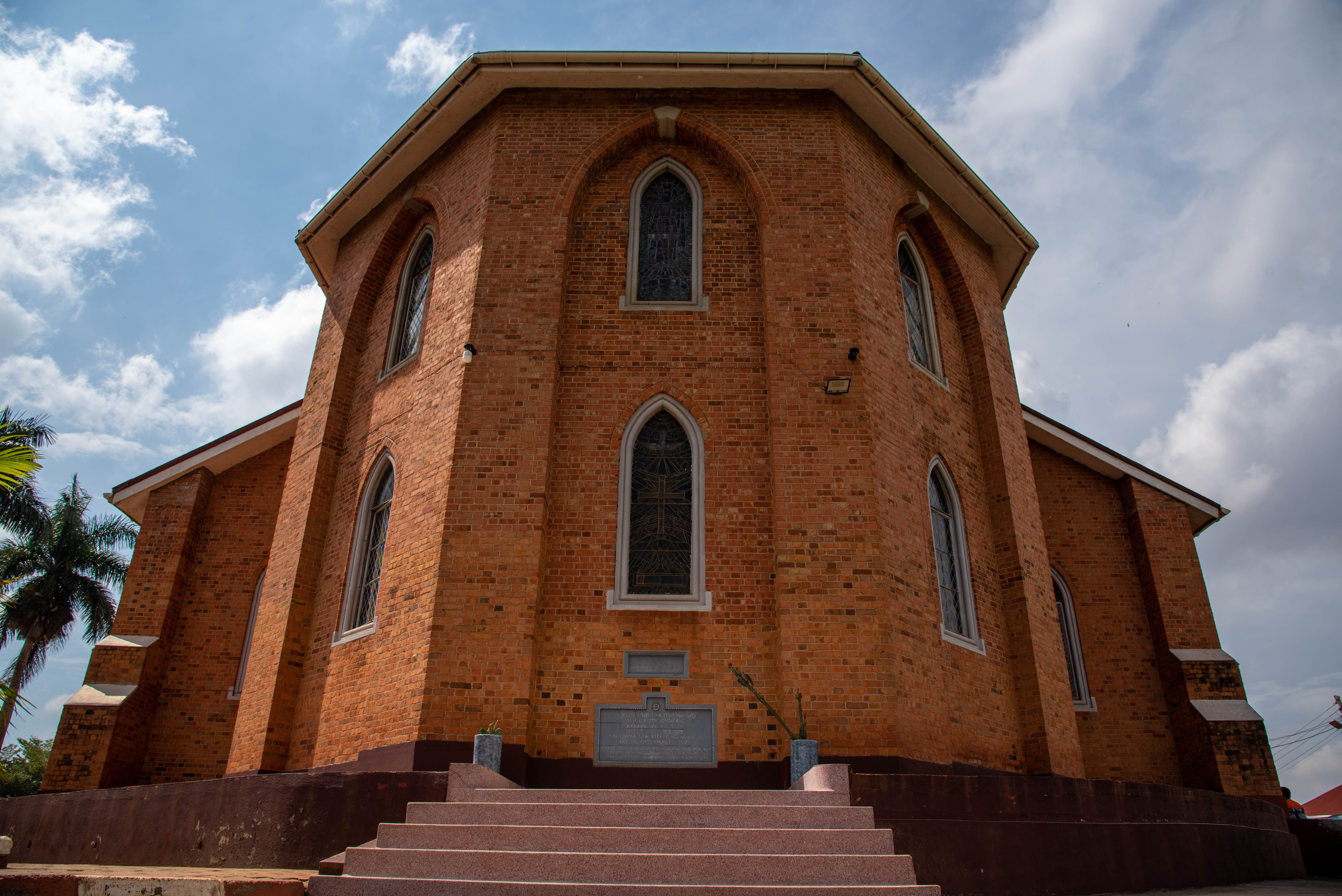
The entrance

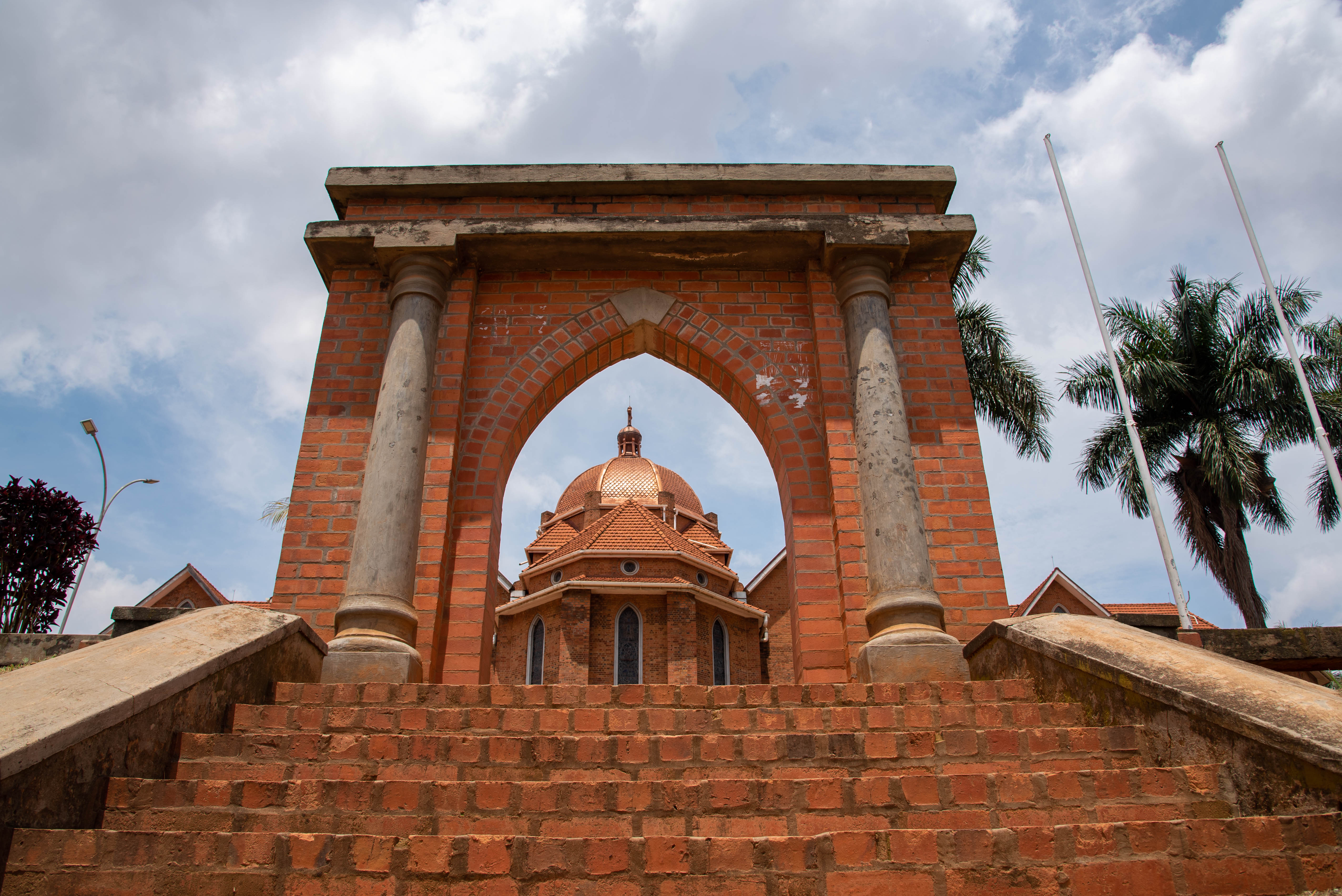
The gate

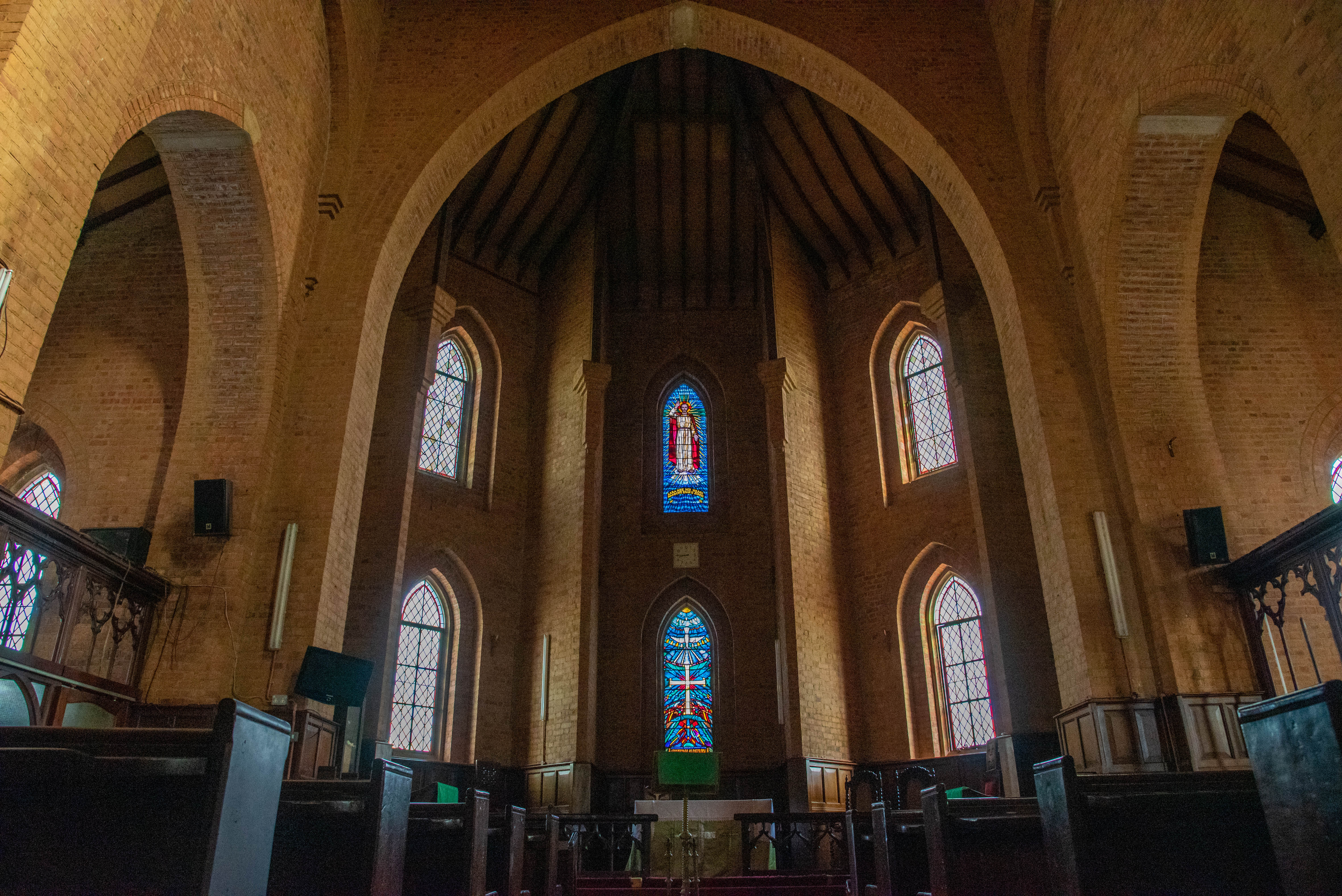
The altar

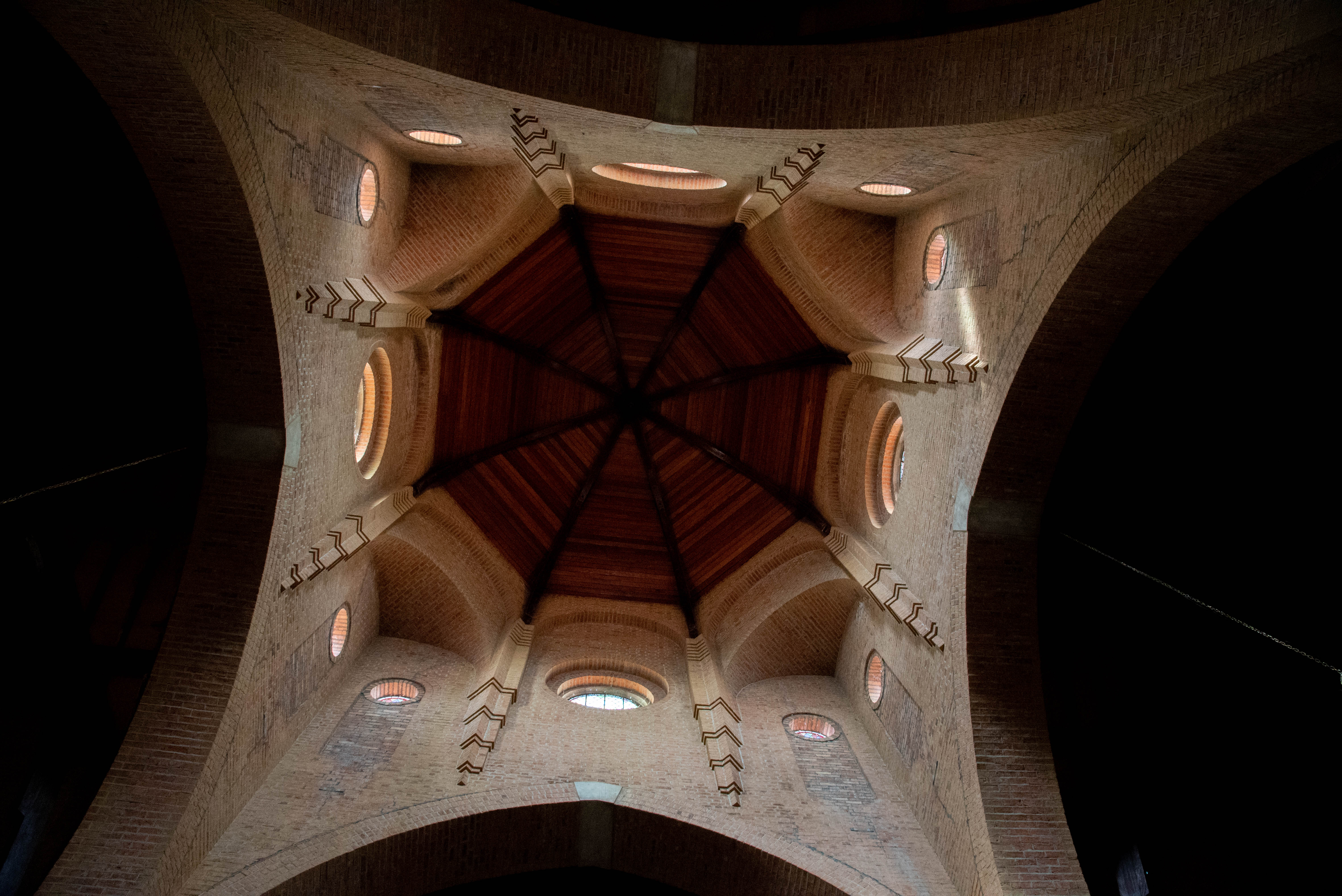
The ceiling

== See also ==
- Mengo
- Mengo Hospital
- Old Kampala
- Lubaga
- Rubaga Cathedral
