= Archbishop of Uganda =

Leader of the Church of Uganda

The Anglican ecclesiastical province of Uganda, Rwanda and Burundi was formed in 1961 following the division of the diocese of Uganda the previous year. In 1960, the Diocese of Uganda was separated and in 1961 the smaller dioceses made a separate Province, under the Archbishop of Uganda, Rwanda and Burundi. Prior to 1980, the province included Uganda, Rwanda, Burundi and Boga, in what was then the country of Zaire. As of August 2025, the Church of Uganda is divided into 39 dioceses and is under the Archbishop of Uganda and Bishop of Kampala.

== Archbishops of Uganda, Rwanda and Burundi ==
- 1961–1966: Leslie Brown, Bishop of Namirembe
- 1966–1972: Erica Sabiti, Bishop of Ruwenzori

== Archbishops of Uganda, Rwanda, Burundi and Boga-Zaire ==
- 1972–1974: Erica Sabiti, Bishop of Kampala
- 1974–1977: Janani Luwum, Bishop of Kampala

== Archbishops of Uganda and Bishops of Kampala ==
- 1977–1984: Silvanus Wani (Archbishop of Uganda, Rwanda, Burundi and Boga-Zaire until 1980)
- 1984–1995: Yona Okoth (previously Bishop of Bukedi)
- 1995–2004: Livingstone Mpalanyi Nkoyoyo
- 2004–2012: Henry Luke Orombi
- 2012–2020: Stanley Ntagali
- 1 March 2020 – present: Stephen Kaziimba

== See also ==
- Anglican dioceses of Buganda
- Anglican dioceses of Eastern Uganda
- Anglican dioceses of Northern Uganda
- Anglican dioceses of Ankole and Kigezi
- Anglican dioceses of Rwenzori
- Roman Catholic Archbishop of Kampala
