= Uganda Christian University =

Ugandan private university

Uganda Christian University (UCU)
- Motto: Alpha And Omega: God The Beginning And The End
- Type: Private
- Established: July 1, 1997; 29 years ago
- Chancellor: Stephen Kaziimba
- Vice-Chancellor: Aaron Mushengyezi
- Students: 15,000 (2020)
- Location: Mukono, Uganda; 0°21′19″N 32°44′26″E
- Campus: Urban Campuses: Mukono and Kampala; Rural Campuses: Kabale, Mbale and Arua.
- Website: Homepage
- Location within Uganda

Uganda Christian University (UCU) is a private church-founded university administered by the Church of Uganda. It was the first private University in Uganda to be awarded a charter by the Government of Uganda.

== Location ==
UCU's main campus, with approximately 15,000 students, is in the town of Mukono, approximately 25 kilometres (16 mi), by road, east of Uganda's capital city, Kampala, on the Kampala-Jinja Highway. The coordinates of the main campus are 0°21'27.0"N, 32°44'29.0"E (Latitude:0.357500; Longitude:32.741389).

Bishop Barham University College is a regional constituent college of UCU, with about 1,500 students, located in the city of Kabale, approximately 420 kilometres (261 mi), by road, south-west of Kampala. Other regional campuses include UCU Mbale Campus, which is in Mbale, and UCU Arua Campus, which is in Arua and UCU Kagando University College (UCU KUC) located in Kagando, Kasese. In 2019 construction of a permanent fifth campus in Kampala began, in the Mengo neighborhood, along Musajja Alumbwa Road.

== Origins ==
UCU was founded in 1997 by the Anglican Church of Uganda from its premier theological seminary/college Bishop Tucker Theological College, which was established in 1913 and named after the pioneer missionary bishop Alfred Robert Tucker.

== Chancellor ==
UCU's chancellor is the Archbishop of Uganda, currently Stephen Kaziimba, since March 2020. The table below outlines the tenures of the chancellors of the university since its inception, in 1997.

The Chancellors of Uganda Christian University
Rank	Chancellor	From	Until	Notes
1	Livingstone Mpalanyi Nkoyoyo	1997	2004	
2	Henry Luke Orombi	2004	2012	
3	Stanley Ntagali	2012	2020	
4	Stephen Kaziimba	2020	Incumbent	

== Vice Chancellor ==
The first vice chancellor, Stephen Noll, was installed in 2000. He is an American Anglican priest, theologian, and missionary. He helped UCU to receive a government charter in 2004, the first of its kind in Uganda. Noll's term as vice chancellor ended in 2010.

John Senyonyi, an evangelist and mathematician, is the UCU's second vice chancellor. He joined UCU as a chaplain in 2001. He rose to become the deputy vice chancellor for finance and administration. Later, he became the first deputy vice chancellor in charge of development and external relations, the first such position in any Ugandan university.

On 1 September 2020, Aaron Mushengyezi, a linguist and former dean of the department of languages, literature and communications at Makerere University, became the third Vice Chancellor at Uganda Christian University.

== UCU today ==
While the majority of faculty and students are Ugandan, UCU has attracted students from other African Great Lakes countries and a number of expatriate staff from North America, Europe, Australia, and New Zealand. These international ties are in part historic through societies like the Church Mission Society and in part new ties formed among churches of the Anglican Communion.

== Schools, faculties and departments ==
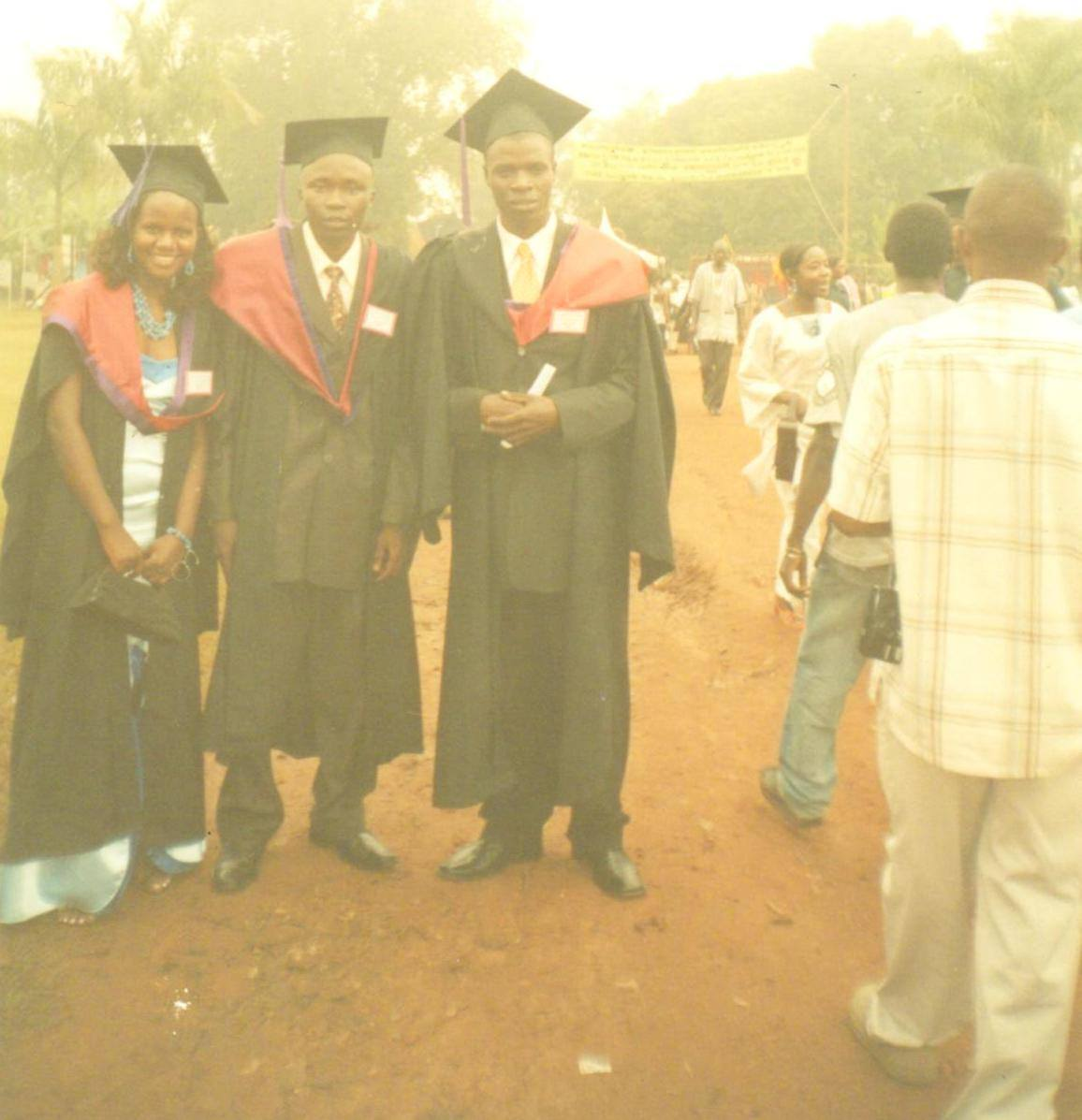
Mass Communication fellows at the 2006 Uganda Christian University (UCU) Graduation in Mukono

As of March 2020, the university is divided into the following schools, faculties, and departments:

1. School of Law
2. UCU School of Medicine
3. Faculty of Public Health, Nursing and Midwifery
4. UCU School of Dentistry
5. Faculty of Agricultural Sciences
6. School of Social Sciences
7. School of Education
8. Faculty of Engineering, Design and Technology
9. School of Business
10. Bishop Tucker School of Divinity and Theology
11. School of Journalism, Media & Communication.

== Library services ==
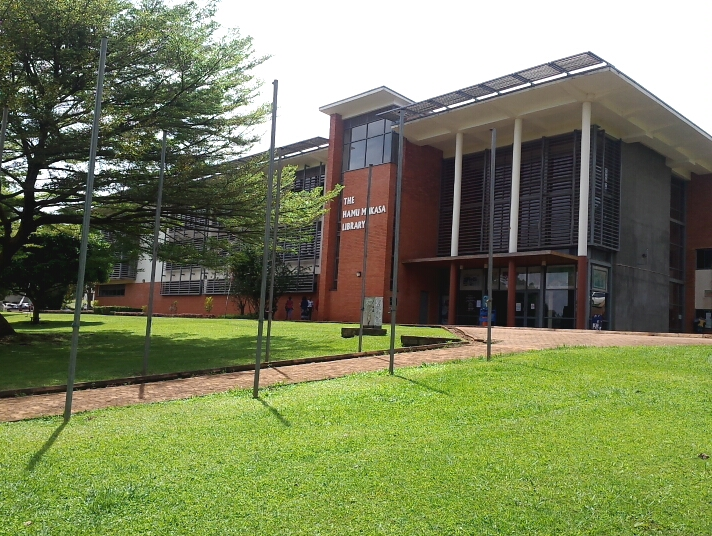
Hamu Mukasa library building

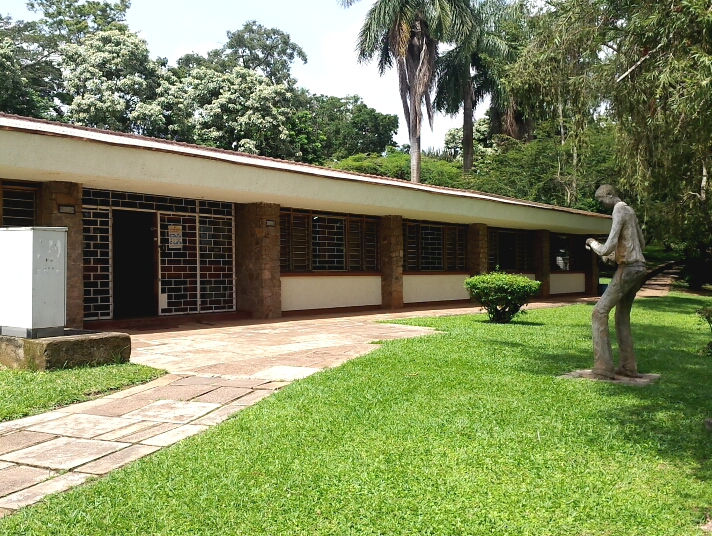
Bishop Tucker Library

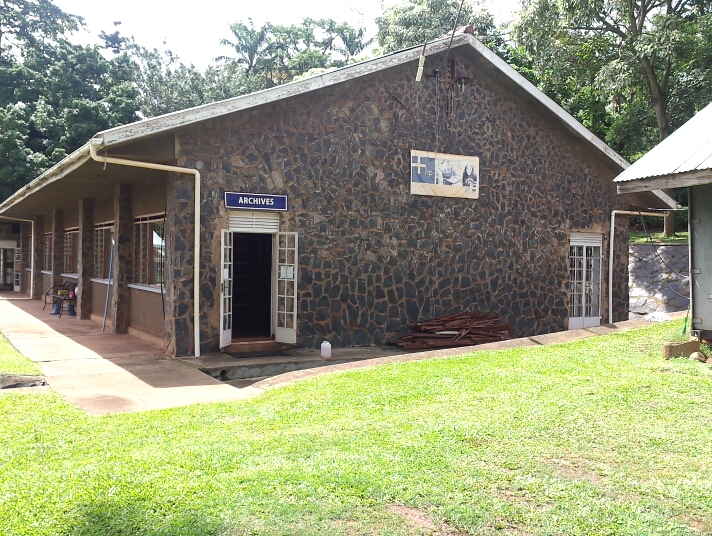
Church of Uganda Archives

UCU has two libraries based at the main campus; that is the Hamu Mukasa Library which serves as the main library and Bishop Tucker Library and branch libraries in all branch campuses and constituent colleges; that is to say; in Mengo, Kampala, Mbale and Kabale Campuses. There is also an archival library based at the main campus.

== Medical school ==
In March 2016, the Daily Monitor newspaper reported that UCU and Mengo Hospital were negotiating for the establishment of a UCU school of medicine at the hospital. No time-frame was disclosed.

On 26 February 2018, the Uganda National Council for Higher Education gave the university a letter of accreditation for three new medical courses (a) Bachelor of Medicine and Bachelor of Surgery, (b) Bachelor of Dental Surgery and (c) Bachelor of Public Health. The three courses will be offered at the Uganda Christian University School of Medicine, starting in August 2018.

== Notable alumni ==
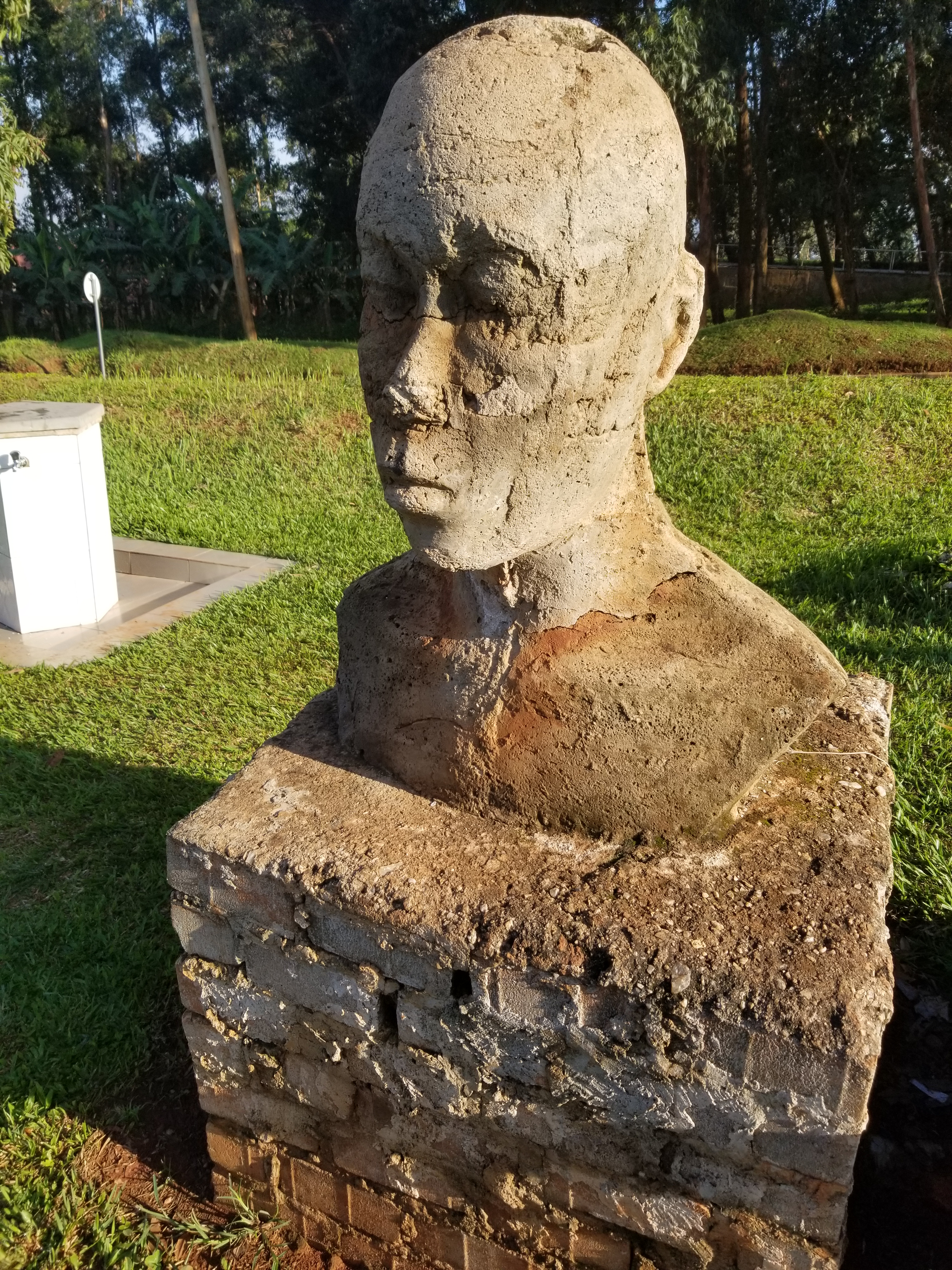
Monuments at Mukono University

=== The Church ===
- Henry Luke Orombi, 7th Archbishop of the Church of Uganda, from 2004 until 2012.
- Eraste Bigirimana, 6th Archbishop of the Anglican Church of Burundi

=== Politics ===
- Ronald Kibuule, Member of Parliament, Minister of State for Water Resources from June 2016 until May 2021
- Joel Ssenyonyi, Member of Parliament, Nakawa West and Leader of opposition in Parliament
- Evelyn Anite, Member of Parliament, Minister of State for Investment and Privatisation, since June 2016
- Alengot Oromait, Member of Parliament for Usuk County, from 2012 until 2016.
- Daniel Kidega, 4th Speaker of the East African Legislative Assembly.

=== Sports ===
- Ivan Lumanyika, basketball player
- Peace Proscovia, professional netball player, captain on Uganda National Netball Team.

=== Others ===
- Grace Akallo, human rights activist
- Joel Okuyo Atiku, actor and model
- Esther Kalenzi – social entrepreneur and founder of 40 Days Over 40 Smiles Foundation (4040)
- Uncle Mark, aka Agaba Mark, Ugandan media personality, comedian and emcee

== Notable faculty ==
- Stephen Noll, 1st Vice Chancellor of UCU, 2000-2010
- John Ntambirweki formerly lectured in the Faculty of Law.
- John Senyonyi, University Chaplain, 2001-2003. 2nd Vice Chancellor of UCU from 2010 to 2020.
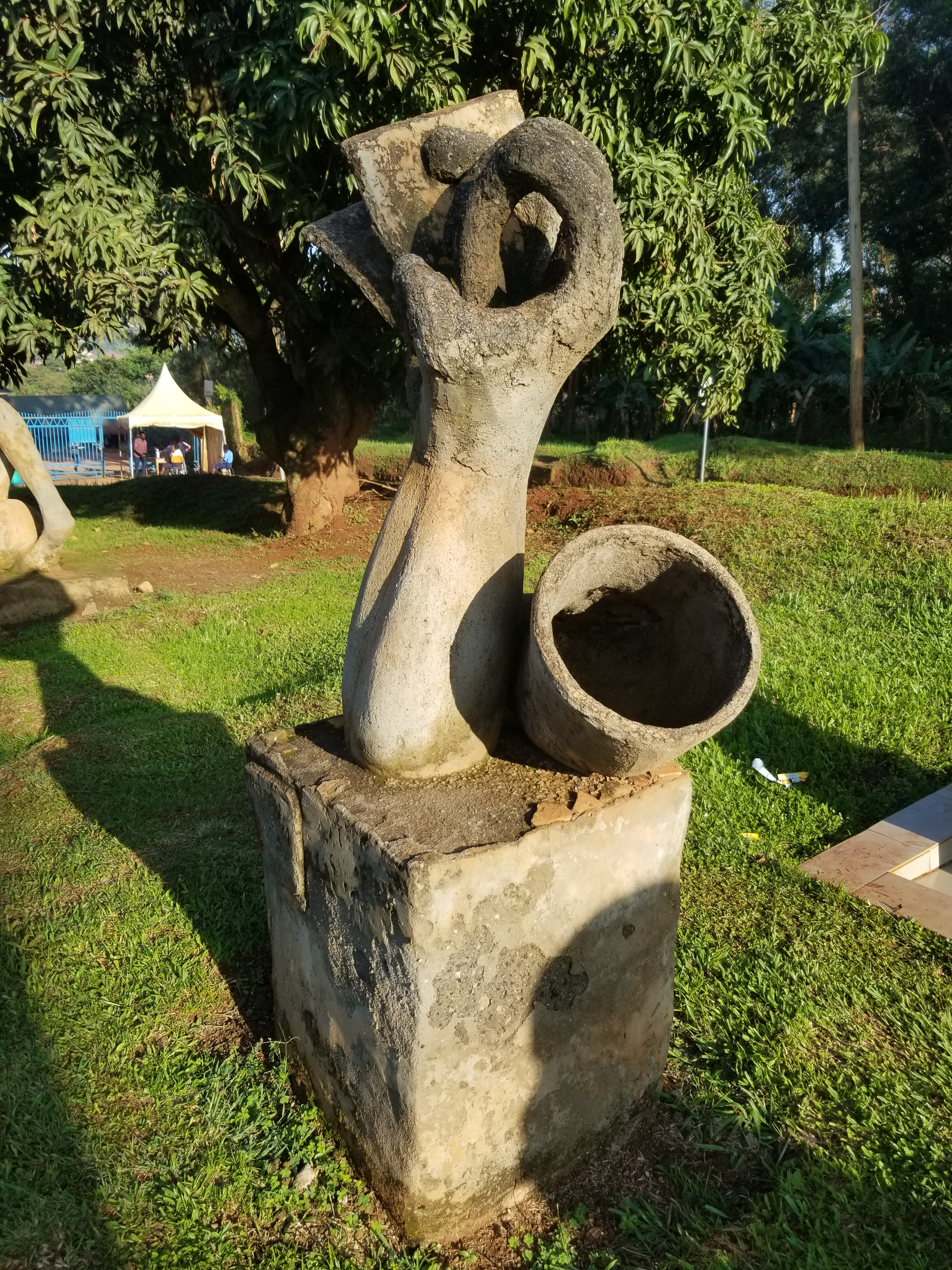
- Monument At Uganda Christian University
  Keith Sutton, lecturer at the then Bishop Tucker Theological College, 1968-1973.
- Monica Balya Chibita, Professor & Dean, Faculty of Journalism, Media and Communication at Uganda Christian University.

== See also ==
- Education in Uganda
- List of universities in Uganda
- Ugandan university leaders
- Mukono
- Church of Uganda
