= Livingstone Mpalanyi Nkoyoyo =

Ugandan Anglican bishop (1995–2004)

The Most Reverend Livingstone Mpalanyi Nkoyoyo
- Archbishop of Uganda and Bishop of Kampala
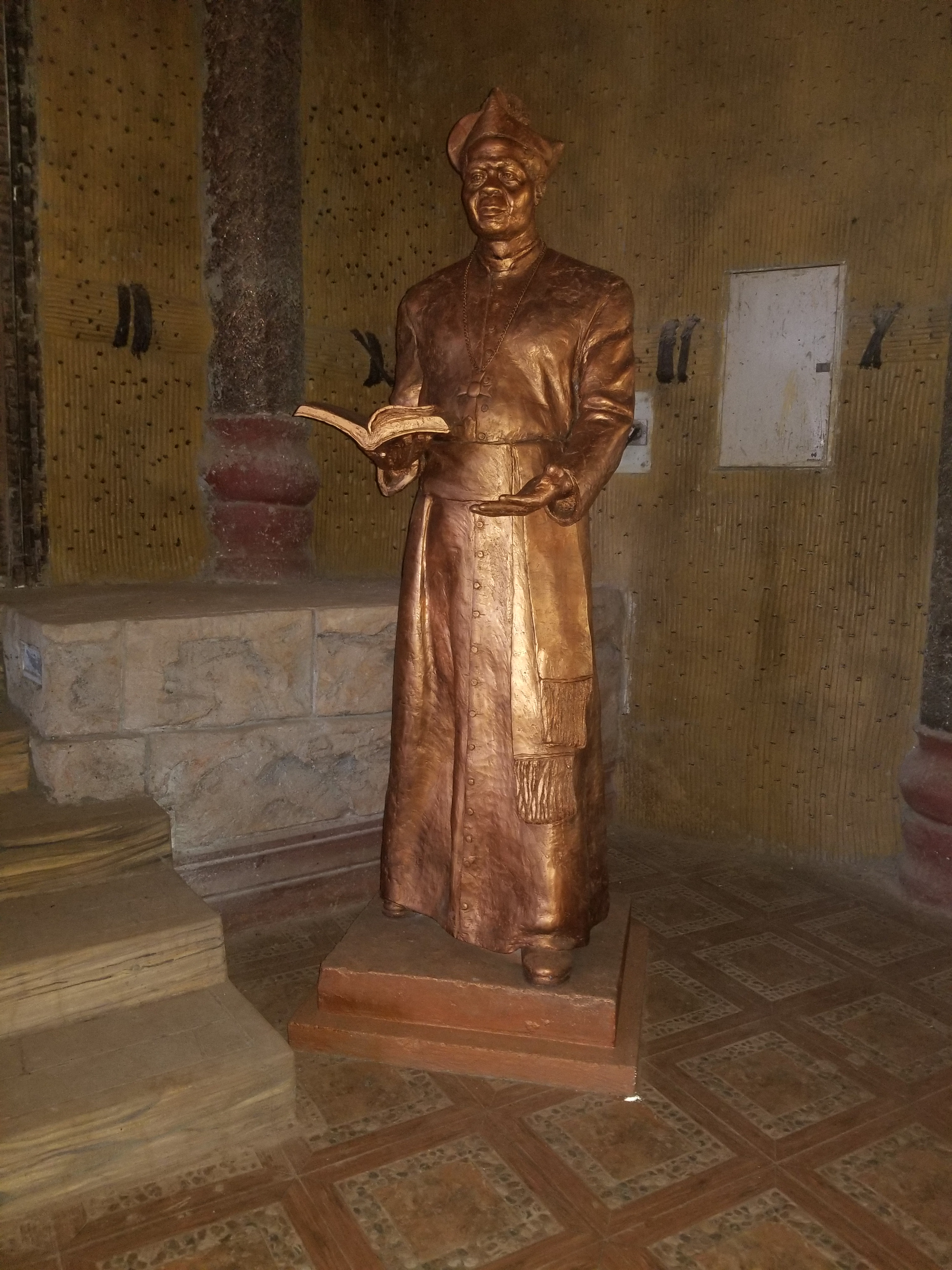
- Native name: Mpalanyi Nkoyooyo
- Church: Church of Uganda
- Archdiocese: Kampala
- Diocese: Kampala
- Installed: 1994
- Term ended: 24 January 2004
- Predecessor: Yona Okoth
- Successor: Henry Luke Orombi

Personal details
- Born: October 4, 1938 Namukozi, Mityana
- Died: January 4, 2018 (aged 79) Kampala Hospital
- Buried: Namugongo; 00°23′51″N 32°39′57″E
- Denomination: Anglicanism
- Spouse: Ruth Nalweyiso
- Children: 5

Livingstone Mpalanyi Nkoyoyo (4 October 1938 – 5 January 2018) was a Ugandan Anglican bishop. He served as the Archbishop and Primate of the Church of Uganda from 1995 to 2004. He was married to Ruth Nalweyiso, since 1965 until his death, and the couple had five children, of which one died before him.

== Early life ==
Nkoyoyo was one of the 25 children of Erisa Wamala Nkoyoyo, a sub-county Chief during Sekabaka Edward Mutesa II's reign. He grew up in a wealthy family, since his father was a rich landowner. He studied at Mpenja Primary School, in Gomba, Aggrey Memorial School and Mityana Junior Secondary School. He moved a lot due to his father's work and had to leave school after completing Junior Secondary School. He then started working as an auto mechanic, for which he kept a lifelong interest.

== Ecclesiastical career ==
He felt his religious calling at a youth camp, at Ndoddo Church, in Gomba District. Shortly after, he became a full-time minister, starting as a church teacher. After attending an ordination training course, he was ordained an Anglican deacon, at Namugongo, on 3 June 1969.

He served as a Suffragan Bishop in Namirembe Diocese, becoming the first Bishop of the Diocese of Mukono, in 1983. He was elected to the House of Bishops of the Church of Uganda to be their 6th Archbishop and Primate, in 1995. He would be in office until 24 January 2004. He was awarded the Bible Leadership Excellence Award by the Bible Society of Uganda, in 2015.

== Death ==
He had successful treatment for cancer in Great Britain in early 2017. He died of pneumonia, at Kampala Hospital, aged 79 years old. He was laid to rest at the Uganda Martyrs Anglican Shrine in Namugongo, on 9 January 2018.

== See also ==
- Church of Uganda
- Mukono

Anglican Communion titles
Preceded by Yona Okoth	Primate of the Anglican Church of Uganda; 1995-2004	Succeeded by Henry Luke Orombi
