= Alexina =

Alexina is a feminine given name. Notable people with the name include:

- Alexina Duchamp (1906–1995), American art dealer
- Alexina Graham (born 1990), English fashion model
- Alexina Kublu (born 1954), Canadian linguist, educator, translator, and jurist
- Alexina Louie (born 1949), Canadian composer
- Alexina Ruthquist (1848–1892), Scottish missionary
- Alexina Maude Wildman (1867–1896), Australian journalist

== See also ==
- The Mystery of Alexina, a 1985 French film
