= Alfred Tucker =

19th and 20th-century English Anglican bishop

The Right Reverend Alfred Robert Tucker
- Bishop of Eastern Equatorial Africa
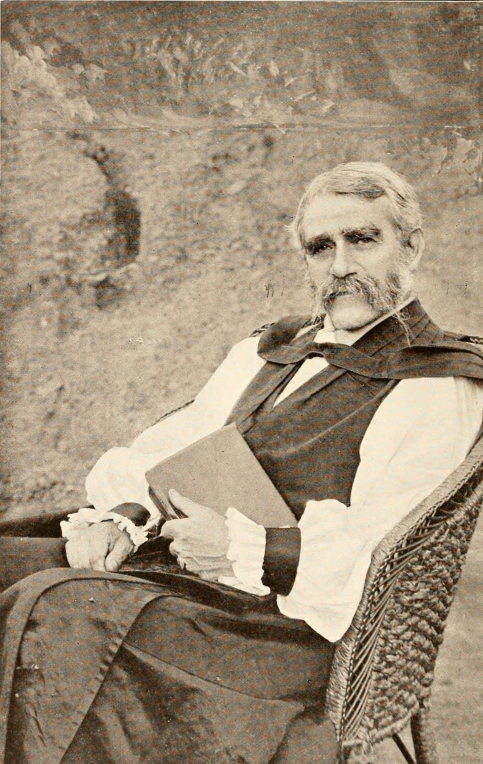
- Church: Church of England
- Diocese: Diocese of Eastern Equatorial Africa
- Installed: 25 April 1890
- Term ended: 25 January 1912
- Predecessor: Henry Parker
- Successor: John Willis

Personal details
- Born: 1 April 1849
- Died: 1914 (aged 64–65)
- Denomination: Anglicanism
- Profession: Bishop
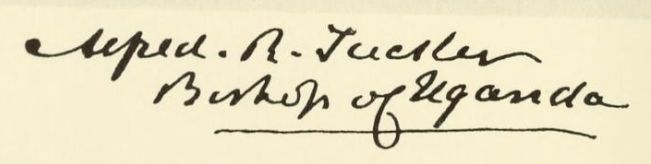
- Signature

Alfred Robert Tucker (1 April 1849–1914) was the Anglican Bishop of Eastern Equatorial Africa (covering the contemporary countries of Uganda, Kenya and Tanzania), from 1890 to 1899, and Bishop of Uganda from 1899 to 1908.

== Early life ==
Tucker was born on 1 April 1849 in Woolwich, Kent, England. His parents, Edward Tucker (1816/17–1898) and Julia Mary Tucker (née Fuller; 1828–1912), were both artists. He left school aged 13, and the family moved to the Lake District in 1865. Following in the footsteps of his family, he became an artist, exhibiting at the Royal Academy.

== Church life ==
In 1879, Tucker became a mature student at the University of Oxford; he was a non-collegiate student and paid his way by selling paintings. This was unusual for an evangelical ordinand of his time, as by far the greater proportion of evangelical students went to the University of Cambridge. He transferred to a college, Christ Church, Oxford, in 1881, and graduated the following year with a pass Bachelor of Arts (BA) degree. As per tradition, his BA was promoted to a Master of Arts (MA Oxon) degree in 1886. While at Oxford, he came under the influence of Canon Alfred Christopher, the evangelical rector of St Aldate's Church.

In 1882, he was ordained curate in Bristol, then at St Nicholas' Church, Durham before being sent out in 1890 by the Church Mission Society to become the third bishop of Eastern Equatorial Africa. He served in this position until 1899. That year, he became the Bishop of Uganda until 1908.

Tucker's style was, notably for this era, one of working with the local culture rather than trying to replace it with European attitudes. He was quoted in 1908 saying, "We are pretty convinced in our mind that we have everything to give and nothing to receive; everything to teach and nothing to learn; moreover we find it very difficult to believe that there is anything good in the pagan races of Africa." He was very much in favour of native garb being used for clergy rather than European cassocks and robes. He argued for African churches to have autonomy, although he continually returned to England for more missionaries, possibly hoping for them to undertake support roles within the church structure rather than the leadership positions that they assumed.

Tucker's approach to the evangelisation of Uganda had three phases: conversion of individual African men; church planting; and finally, education.

== Latter years ==
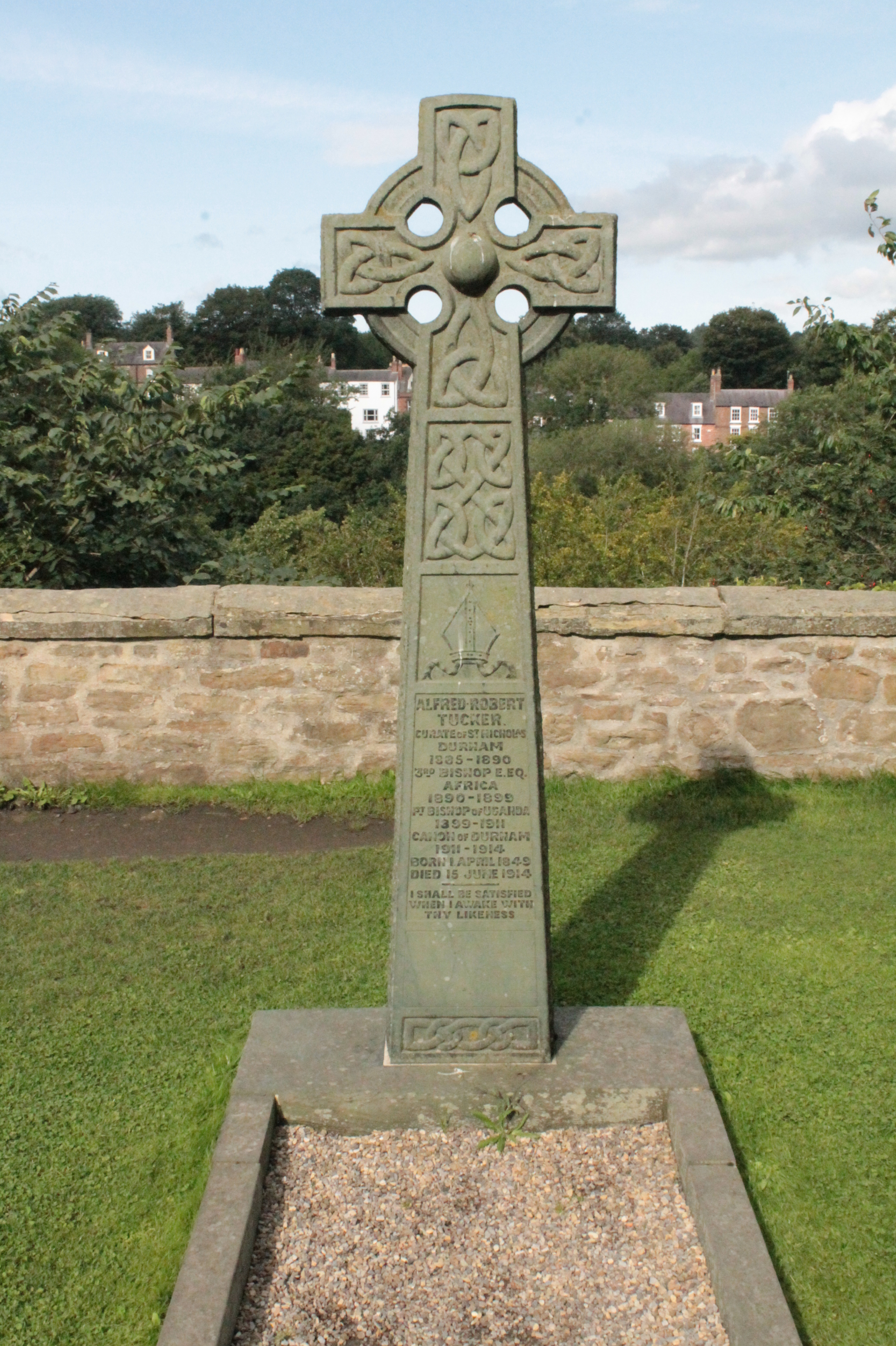
The grave of Alfred Robert Tucker, Durham Cathedral graveyard

In 1911, Tucker returned to Durham where he spent his days as a canon of Durham Cathedral. He died in 1914 and was buried outside the cathedral, where a tall Celtic cross marks his grave. It stands in the raised area to the right of the main entrance path.

== Bishop Tucker Theological College ==
In 1913, a year before Bishop Tucker's death, Uganda's first theological college was formed. On his death, it was named Bishop Tucker Theological College. In 1997, it became Uganda Christian University. In 2004, the university's theology faculty was named "The Bishop Tucker School of Divinity and Theology."

== Publications ==
- Tucker, Alfred. Eighteen Years in Uganda and East Africa. London: Edward Arnold (1908).

== See also ==
- William Taylor (missionary) — Missionary who became bishop of Africa in the 19th century.
- Robert Moffat (missionary) — Missionary in South Africa, who translated the Bible into the African Sechuana language.
- John McKendree Springer — Pioneering missionary instrumental in developing Methodism on the continent of Africa.
- Alexander Murdoch Mackay — Missionary who preached and taught in central Africa who worked with David Livingstone and Sir John Kirk

== Sources ==
- Tucker of Uganda, by Arthur P. Shepherd (1929) at anglicanhistory.org Full-text book about Tucker
