= Karl Ludwig Jühlke =

German explorer

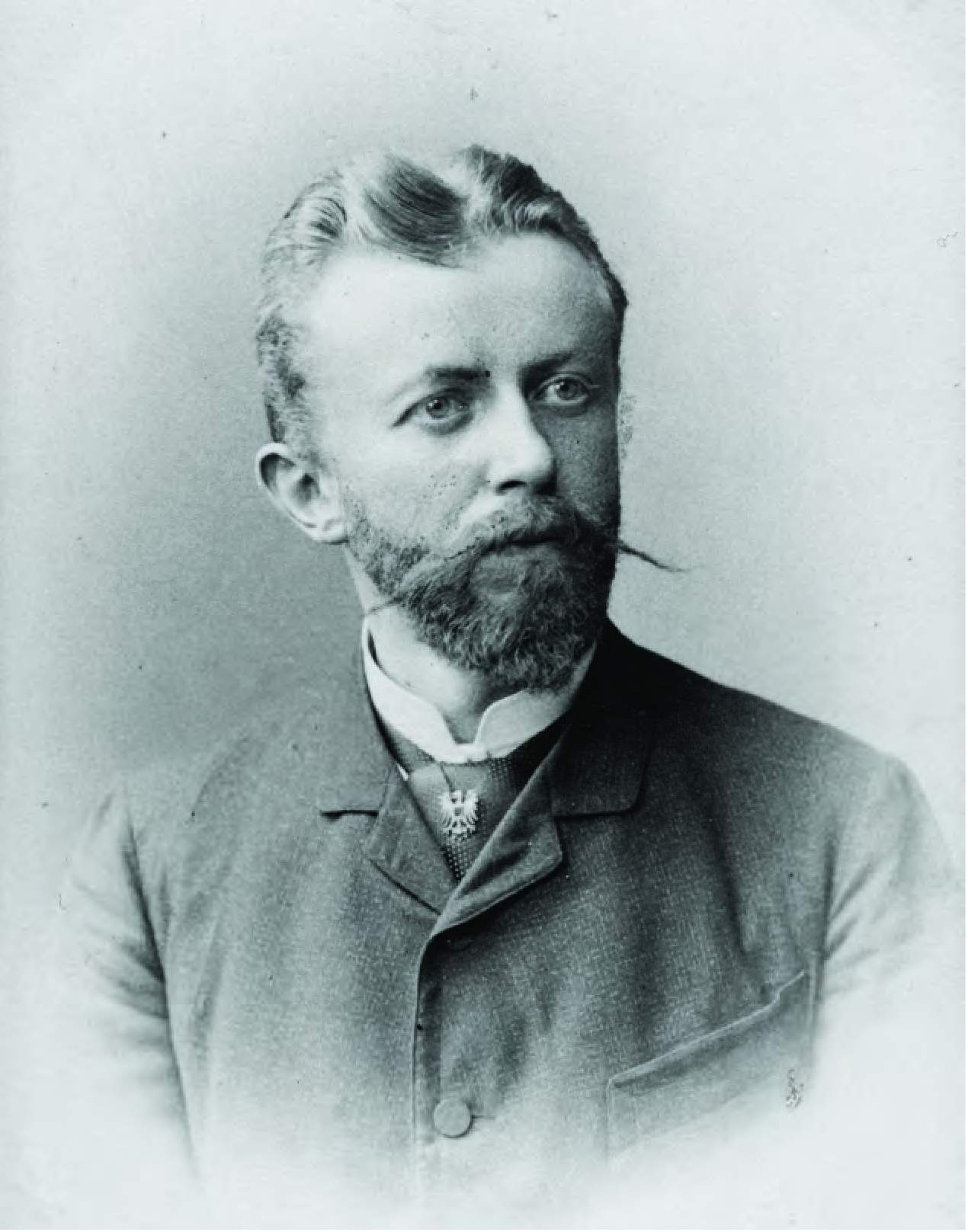
- ca. 1880
- Born: 6 September 1856; Eldena (Greifswald), Pomerania, Prussia, Germany
- Died: 1 December 1886 (aged 30); Kismayo, German East Africa
- Education: Königliche Klosterschule, Ilfeld; University of Tübingen; University of Leipzig; University of Heidelberg and University of Berlin
- Occupations: Lawyer; Africa explorer Colonial administrator
- Parent(s): Ferdinand Jühlke (1815-1893); Maria Johanna Caroline Bladt (1817-1899)

Karl Ludwig Jühlke (6 September 1856 - 1 December 1886) was a German explorer. He was a leading member of the team which in 1885 set the groundwork for creating the colony of German East Africa. His killing in Kismayo at the end of 1886 by a Somali, who remains unnamed in sources, provoked strong government anger in Berlin where it was reported as a murder undertaken on instructions which came, it was not unreasonable to conclude, from the Sultan of Zanzibar.

== Life ==
=== Provenance and early years ===
Karl Ludwig Jühlke was born at Eldena (Greifswald), where his father had recently resigned after twenty successful years as a high-profile educator at the Royal Agricultural Academy in order to accept a (more itinerant) government job. His father was the distinguished horticulturist Ferdinand Jühlke. His mother, born Maria Johanna Caroline Bladt (1817-1899), was the daughter of a dance teacher. There were two sisters, but Karl Ludwig was his parents' only recorded son. He attended school initially, in Erfurt where the family had moved in 1858 in connection with his father's work. The family moved again in 1868 and it was at a secondary school in Potsdam that the boy received most of his schooling. In 1874 he was switched again, to the prestigious "Königliche Klosterschule" (as it was known at that time) at Ilfeld, and it was here that in 1877 he passed his "Abitur" (school finals), opening the way to university-level education. A school contemporary at Ilfeld who became a friend was Carl Peters.

=== Student years and qualification as a lawyer ===
In Germany at this time it was not unusual for promising young men of Jühlke's background to attend several universities in succession. He studied Jurisprudence at Tübingen, Leipzig, Heidelberg and Berlin. It was at Heidelberg that he received his doctorate in law. Early in 1881 he passed his "Referendar" exam, qualifying him to work as a court official in Werder and later, as a government lawyer, in Potsdam. By this time he was also a reserve officer with the 20th Brandenburg Infantry Regiment, having completed his military service with a "Garde-Jäger" infantry battalion.

=== Society for German Colonization ===
Jühlke's life took an abrupt change of direction in 1884 with the founding of the "Society for German Colonization" ("Gesellschaft für deutsche Colonisation"). The driving force behind the society's creation was his old school friend Carl Peters, who had just returned from a long stay in London where he had lived with his rich uncle Carl Engel, and used the available opportunities to study the principles of British colonialism. Jühlke was an enthusiastic early recruit to the project, as the society's secretary. In the end he probably contributed more to the creation of what became the German East Africa Company and the extensive colonisation that ensued.

By the time Germany had become a "modern (Anglo-French style)" unified and increasingly centralised state most parts of the globe that in earlier centuries had been considered (in Europe) as suitable candidates for conquest had already been colonised. Large parts of Africa were still, from the European perspective, available, however. On 24 September 1884 Jühlke and Carl Peters met up with another old school friend, Joachim von Pfeil, and the Austrian adventurer-businessman, August Otto. They met under conditions of careful secrecy, using false names for themselves. During October/November 1884 they made their way to East Africa, sailing with third class tickets under their assumed names from Trieste to Aden. Aden was a British protectorate, and here they boarded the "Bagdad", a vessel of the British India Steam Navigation Company which was part owned by the Scots businessman William Mackinnon (who already had extensive commercial interests of his own in East Africa). On 4 November 1884 the men met up at Zanzibar. They stayed in town for just over a week, trying to ensure that their supplies and equipment were complete, and then on 12 November crossed the channel to the African continent itself and set off inland, following the Wami River towards Saadani in the Ussagara countryside. Their passage was facilitated by the caravan that accompanied them, which they had hired from an Indian merchant, but their method of travel is nevertheless described as a "forced march". On reaching their destination, Peters and Jühlke returned to the coast. The inland expedition had lasted only six weeks, but the German party had nevertheless laid the groundwork for future colonisation by "signing [twelve] contracts" with ten "independent chiefs". (It is far from obvious that the Sultan of Zanzibar regarded the chiefs in question as independent.) The contracts (or treaties) would be ratified by the emperor on behalf of Germany during the early part of 1885.

=== Coloniser ===
As a result of the twelve treaties concluded by the Peters expedition and ratified by the German emperor, approximately 150,000 km^{2} of territory were acquired on behalf of the Society for German Colonization, covering Useguha, Ukami, Unguru and Ussagara. The grant, during or shortly before March 1885, of a "Letter of Protection" effectively brought the enterprise under German government protection. Jühlke now remained in Zanzibar as the society's representative. Back in Berlin, in April 1885 the Society for German Colonization was rebranded, and registered in the companies register as the German East Africa Company. Responsible, at least notionally, to the German consul in Zanzibar, as far as the extensive - and largely "unexplored" territories on the African mainland across the channel were concerned, Jühlke exercised considerable powers on behalf of the company. As far as the Sultan was concerned, Jühlke represented the rapidly evolving German imperial project. In April 1885, according to European belief, the sultan agreed to lease the mainland coastal strip to the company, but he also seems to have been under the impression that the territory "acquired" by the Peters expedition on the African mainland remained a Zanzibar protectorate: the arrival later that year of a German naval squadron under Admiral Knorr persuaded the sultan to understand - with considerable reluctance - that he had been incorrect about this: a treaty guaranteeing perpetual friendship and sincere peace was negotiated and, at the end of 1885, signed between Germany and Zanzibar.

Chancellor von Bismarck was never a man to share his intentions indiscriminately, but during the course of 1885 it became very clear that he was no longer content to leave European imperial expansion to the French and the British. The British had become increasingly isolated within Europe, but the German government nevertheless had reason to welcome - and quietly to endorse - Britain's obsessive concern over Russian expansionism which had been on display since before 1855. On the world stage, too, German governments had reason to welcome British imperial expansion and a counterweight to French ambitions. In East Africa, therefore, the rivalry inherent in the unfolding overlapping ambitions of the British and the German governments between 1885 and 1914 would be disguised under a curiously collaborative cloak. However, if Bismarck's government remained diplomatic low-key over plans for colonising large parts of East Africa, Carl Peters was not operating under the same constraints. He and his fellow company directors, appreciated that the twelve week Ussagara expedition at the end of 1884 had left their colonisation project unfinished. During 1885 numerous further expeditions were sent inland from the East African coast. One of these took Jühlke as far as Mount Kilimanjaro. During most of 1885 he remained in Zanzibar City, leaving expeditions to explore the African interior to others, but on 10 May 1885 he set out for the interior from Pangani, accompanied by a Premierlieutenant Weiß, in response to an order received, via the recently installed telegraph, from Berlin.

The sudden urgency arose when it became known that the Sultan of Zanzibar, thoroughly fed up with the behaviour of Peters and the German company, was launching his own expedition to Kilimanjaro, under the leadership of an Englishman, General Lloyd Mathews. It appears that the English arrived slightly ahead of the Germans, but any margin would have been slight. The two expeditions met each other on the lower slopes of Mount Kilimanjaro, but managed to pass each other without exchanging a word. Jühlke's expedition continued back to Moshi, the main town in Mandara. Moshi was home to the most powerfully independent sultan in the Dschaggaland region. The Germans stayed for four days. Vows of eternal "Blutsfreundschaft" (literally, "blood friendship") were exchanged. The journey back to the coast was quicker than the trip inland had been. It involved forced marches along the southern side of the Pare Mountains and through Usambara, concluding with a rapid passage downstream along the Pangani River, most of which they were able to complete by boat. They may not have "won the race" to reach Mount Kilimanjaro, but by the time they crossed the channel to their base back in Zanzibar, on 6 July 1885, Jühlke and his team had concluded a number of further treaties with local chiefs which, it would become apparent, amounted to acceptance of the company's sovereignty over the entire region between Pangani and Kilimanjaro. A few years later, on 20 November 1890, the company agreed to transfer its administrative role and the region became unambiguously part of German East Africa.

After that, apart from a brief trip to Ussagara, Jühlke spent the rest of 1885 attending to the interests of the company from and in Zanzibar. In March 1886 he made the journey back to Germany for a few months of rest and recuperation. When he returned to East Africa he was now able to travel on a German ship. On 6 August 1886 he embarked from Hamburg on board the steamship "Isolde", accompanied by a Lieutenant Günther and a businessman called "Janke". They sailed not to Zanzibar but to Aden, where they transferred to the gunboat SMS Hyäne, which carried them to Alula, a Somali coastal settlement. It proved impossible to take a boat inland up the Jubba River due to the strength of the coastal surf and currents at the estuary where the river entered the sea. A robust whaleboat was procured from Zanzibar, but it turned over. Lieutenant Günther and two sailors were killed. Following an abrupt change of plan Jühlke nevertheless secured treaties with a number of "independent" chiefs along the Benadiri Coast between Makdischu and Warschekh, and then as far to the south as Witu, by the end of October 1886. This latest batch of land acquisitions were never confirmed by the German government, however, and in the 1890 Zanzibar Treaty was formally ceded to the British, along with Wituland.

Following protracted negotiations with the Ali ibn Ismail, the Sultan of Kismayo, which involved both Jühlke and von Pfeil, on 26 November 1886 the Germans were able to see the company flag raised over "Hohenzollernhafen", at Wubushi, a natural harbour at the mouth of the Burgabo River. Plans seem to have existed for substantial development of the port, though these appear not, at this stage, to have been implemented. The flag planting and renaming nevertheless incurred the wrath of the Sultan of Zanzibar who had been under the impression that the entire section of the Somali coast in question was part of his sultanate. It also enraged Chancellor Bismarck, since the company men had named their company trading post after German's ruling family without involving the emperor or his government in their decision. Bismarck found this approach "arbitrary and unattractive" ("willkürlich und nicht genehm"). In 1890 the Anglo-German agreement partitioning the East German colonial territories between Germany and England, while compensating the Sultan of Zanzibar for his resulting loss of income, superseded these concerns, since "Hohenzollernhafen" ended up in British East Africa. The British called it "Port Durnford". In 1924 it was ceded to the Italians as part of their reward for participating in the First World War on the British side. They called it "Bur Gavo" which was the Somali name of the entire town, adapted for Italian speakers.

=== Killing ===
On 1 December 1886, with a large consignment of equipment for beginning work on the new port installations planned for "Hohenzollernhafen", and directly after an apparently friendly meeting with the Sultan of Zanzibar, Karl Ludwig Jühlke was "treacherously murdered" ("heimtückisch ermordet"). The killing came shortly after his appointment as the company's Chief Representative for the Somali Coast was formalised.
