= Society for German Colonization =

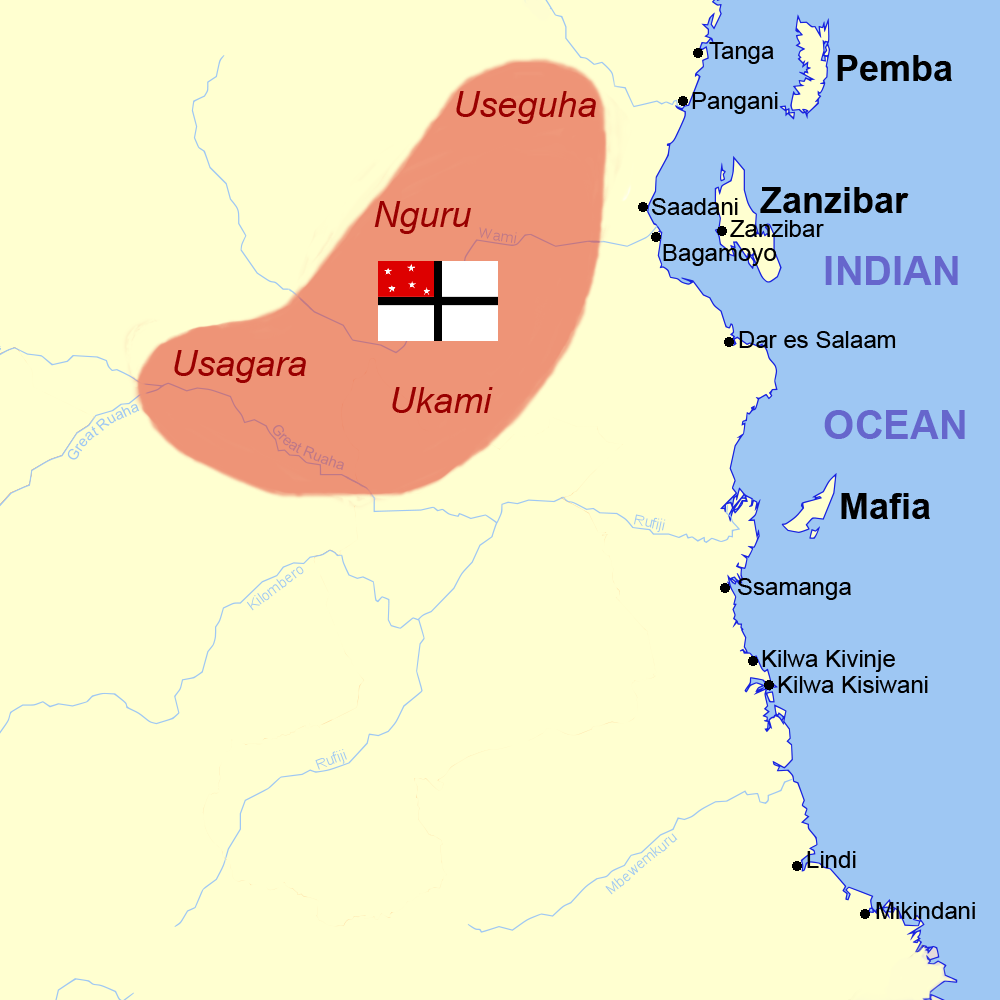
East African territory claimed by the GfdK

The Society for German Colonization (German: Gesellschaft für Deutsche Kolonisation, GfdK) was founded on 28 March 1884 in Berlin by Carl Peters. Its goal was to accumulate capital for the acquisition of German colonial territories in overseas countries.

== History ==
Peters had just returned from London, where he lived with his well-off uncle Carl Engel and studied the principles of European colonialism. In the autumn of 1884 he proceeded, together with his friends Karl Ludwig Jühlke and Count Joachim von Pfeil, to the Sultanate of Zanzibar. Peters had initially planned to prospect for gold in Southern African Mashonaland (in present-day Zimbabwe) but discovered that the territory had already been claimed by the British.

Peters' Zanzibar expedition was a nuisance to the German government of Chancellor Bismarck, focused on good relations with both Sultan Barghash bin Said and the British Empire, and the German consul Gerhard Rohlfs made that clear to him. Peters, Jühlke and von Pfeil, suspiciously eyed by the British envoy John Kirk, thereupon embarked to the East African Tanganyika mainland. During their journey in November and December 1884, Peters concluded several "treaties of protection" (Schutzverträge) with tribal chiefs in the Useguha, Ussagara, Nguru, and Ukami regions as a "Representative of German Colonization". The provisions, issued in German, conferred all rights to exploit the territories on the Gesellschaft für Deutsche Kolonisation in exchange for some inexpensive gifts.

Returning to Germany in February 1885, Peters demanded the implementation of an official protection status for the areas. Bismarck meanwhile had developed his own colonial strategies and from 15 November 1884 hosted the Berlin Conference that fuelled the "Scramble for Africa". Though the chancellor still expressed serious doubts regarding Peters' land acquisitions, he finally gave in with respect to the expansion of the Belgian colonial empire in Congo while the British were occupied with Mahdist War in Sudan. One day after the end of the Berlin Conference, on 27 February 1885, the GfdK obtained an imperial charter issued by Emperor Wilhelm I.

On 2 April 1885 Peters formed the German East Africa Company (Deutsch-Ostafrikanische Gesellschaft, DOAG), modelled on the East India Company. He was aware that the imperial charter marked the beginning of a large-scale seizure of land to create reality, which soon resulted in an official note of protest by Sultan Barghash bin Said. Bismarck found himself constrained to send a squadron of Imperial Navy gunboats under Admiral Eduard von Knorr to the port of Zanzibar, whereafter the sultan relented and on 20 December 1885 signed a "treaty of friendship" recognising the acquisitions of German East Africa. However, Peters' ongoing impetuous advance caused further unrest, culminating in the Abushiri Revolt of 1888/89.

The DOAG superseded the Gesellschaft für Deutsche Kolonisation which was merged in 1887 with the Deutscher Kolonialverein into the German Colonial Society (Deutsche Kolonialgesellschaft).

== See also ==
- German East Africa
- German colonial empire

== Bibliography ==
- J. Wagner (1886), Deutsch-Ostafrika: Geschichte der Gesellschaft für deutsche Kolonisation und der Deutsch-Ostafrikanischen Gesellschaft nach den amtlichen Quellen (in German), Berlin: Verlag der Engelhardťschen Landkartenhandlung
