= Bishop Hannington Memorial Church =

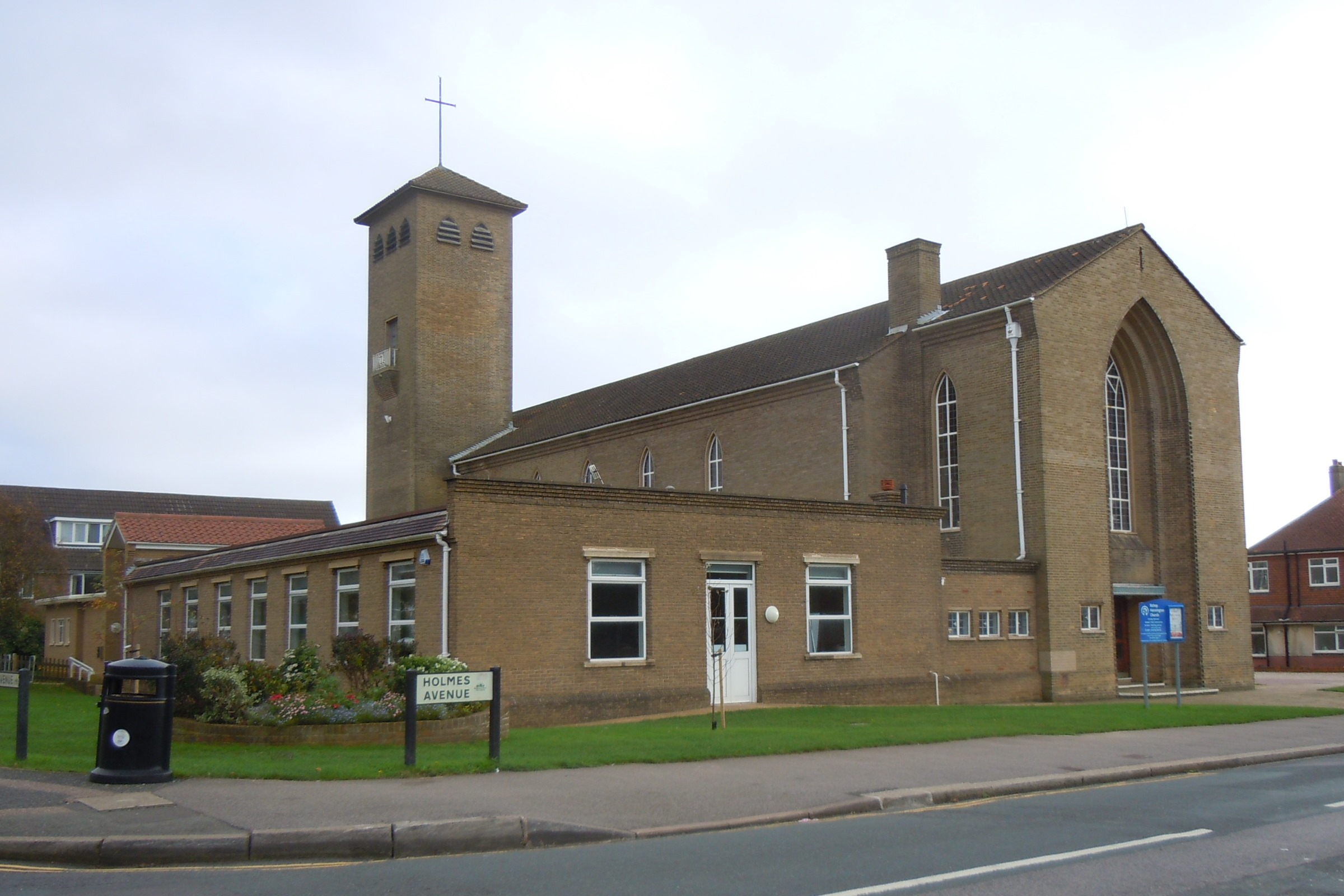
- The church from the northwest
- Bishop Hannington Memorial Church
- 50.8426°N 0.1873°W
- Denomination: Church of England
- Churchmanship: Conservative Evangelical
- Website: www.bhmc.org.uk

History
- Dedication: Bishop Hannington

Architecture
- Architect: Sir Edward Maufe

Administration
- Province: Canterbury
- Diocese: Chichester
- Archdeaconry: Brighton & Lewes
- Deanery: Rural Deanery of Hove
- Parish: Hove, Bishop Hannington Memorial Church

Clergy
- Vicar: The Revd Dr Nick Tucker

Bishop Hannington Memorial Church is an Anglican church in the West Blatchington area of Hove, in the English city of Brighton and Hove. Built in 1938 and 1939, it commemorates James Hannington, first Bishop of East Equatorial Africa, who was murdered in Uganda in 1885 on the orders of Mwanga II of Buganda while engaged in missionary work. It was built to a design by Sir Edward Maufe.

== History ==
Although born at Hurstpierpoint, a few miles north of Brighton and Hove, James Hannington was part of the Brighton family which owned the long-established Hanningtons department store in Brighton. He was ordained into the priesthood in 1874, and served as the curate of St George's Church in Hurstpierpoint until volunteering for missionary work in east Africa in 1882. Although he had to return to Britain in 1883 because of illness, he went back to Uganda in 1884 and was ordained as Bishop of Eastern Equatorial Africa on 24 June 1884.

Along with a group of men, he prepared to enter Uganda by way of a new, more direct route from the northeastern side of Lake Victoria. The group had almost reached their destination when they were intercepted by representatives of Mwanga II, the Kabaka of Buganda; they were arrested, and all but four men were killed eight days later on 29 October 1885.

The Diocese of Chichester decided to build a new church in the martyred bishop's memory. A datestone was embedded by the entrance, commemorating Bishop Hannington and recording the date as 26 November 1938. The Bishop of Chichester, George Bell, laid the stone.

== Architecture ==
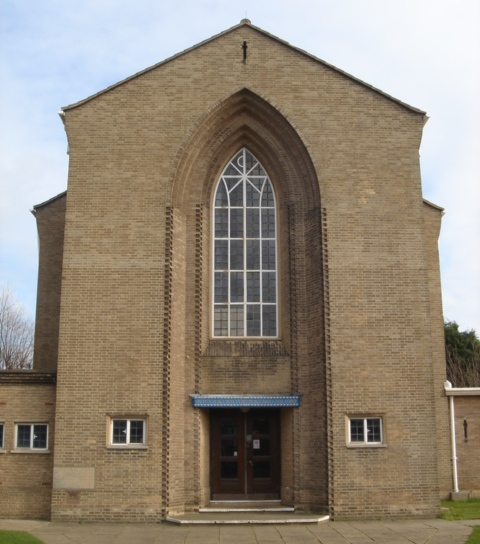
The tall recessed arch of the west entrance

It was designed and built by Sir Edward Maufe between 1938 and 1939, who was notable, chiefly, for his design of Guildford Cathedral and his work for the Imperial War Graves Commission. The church is a large building on a corner site, with an entrance at the west end and a tall bell tower at the northeast corner. Brown brick is the main building material, although the roof is laid with pantiles. This roof has a shallow pitch, while the large tower has a similar but steeper roof topped with a cross. An annex used as a day centre was added on the northern side in the 1970s in a matching style, although it has a flat roof. The main body of the church consists of a chancel, an organ bay in the tower and a Lady chapel in the southeast corner. The nave has 5½ bays with aisles on each side. The main entrance at the west end is set into a tall pointed arch faced with decorative brickwork. Above this is a deeply recessed arched window, and there are two similar but smaller windows in the adjacent north and south faces. The floor of the chancel is laid with travertine, a rock which resembles both limestone and marble, and the nave incorporates locally produced beech wood. The martyr's crown device is used frequently in the internal fittings and decoration, reflecting Bishop Hannington's martyrdom.

The church became a listed building on 2 November 1992, attaining Grade II status.

== The church today ==
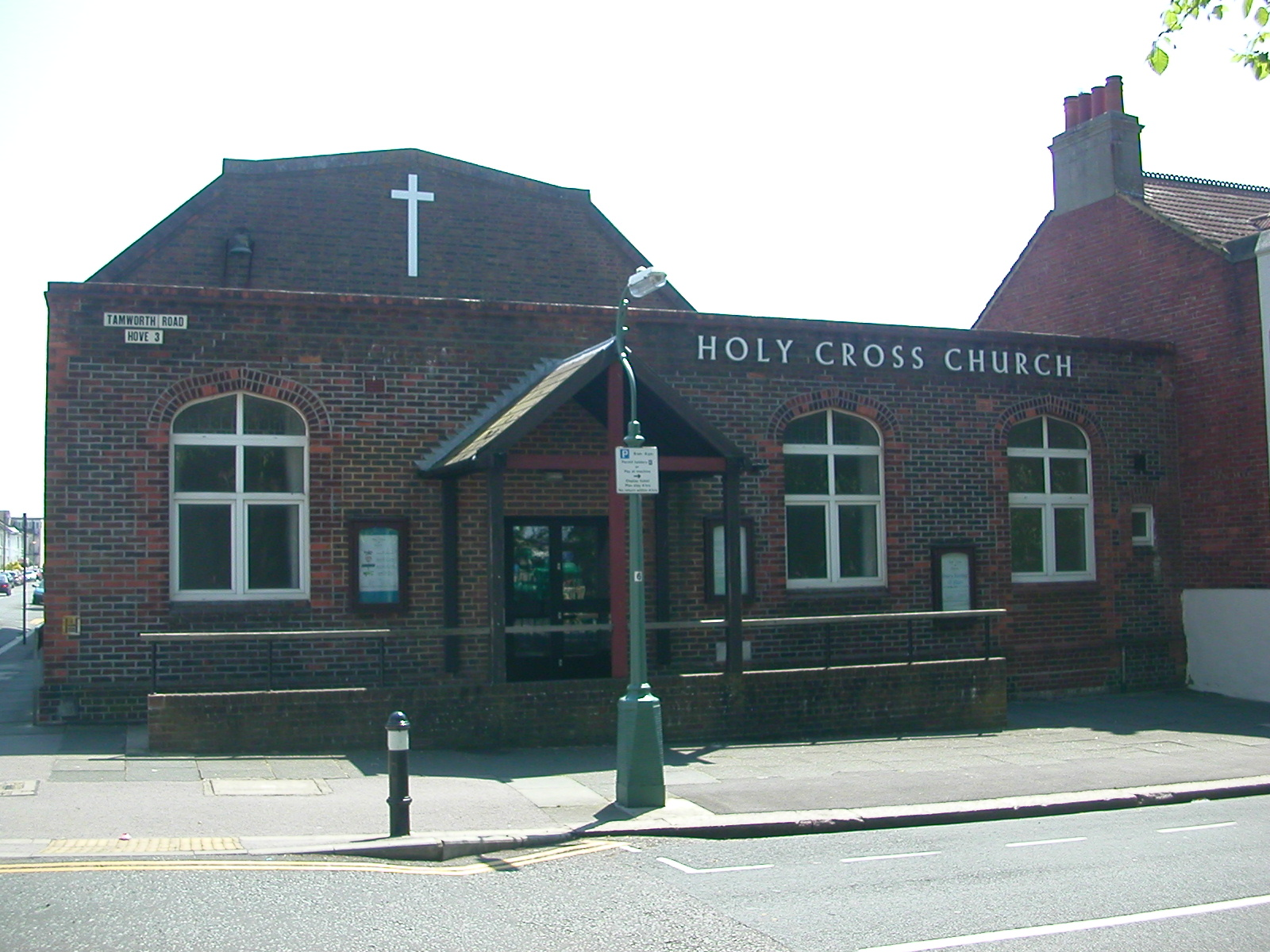
Holy Cross church, within the parish of Bishop Hannington Memorial Church

Church services are evangelical in nature; there is a weekly Communion service on Sunday mornings at 8am, two other services on Sundays at 10am and 6.30pm, small groups that meet for bible study and prayer in people's homes, CAMEO for older people to come and meet each other and various youth groups and children's facilities. As well as the clergy the Church has a staff team made up of a youth minister, women & families minister, music minister and office staff who help with the running of many of the groups and Sunday services alongside many of the members of the Church family. The church is within the Conservative Evangelical tradition.

The Benefice and parish of Bishop Hannington Memorial Church includes the Holy Cross Church, a small Anglican church which also worships in the Conservative Evangelical tradition. This is an older building, dating from 1903, and serves the area around Aldrington railway station. There are services every Sunday, including a Communion service each month, and various groups and events for young people both on Sundays and during the week. The boundaries of the parish are Portland Road (between Bolsover Road and Westbourne Street), Rowan Avenue, Hangleton Road, Nevill Avenue and Hove Park.

== See also ==
- Grade II listed buildings in Brighton and Hove: A–B
- List of places of worship in Brighton and Hove
- St Mary's Church, Hampden Park, Eastbourne
