= Henry Parker (bishop) =

English Anglican bishop

Henry Perrott Parker
- former Bishop of Eastern Equatorial Africa
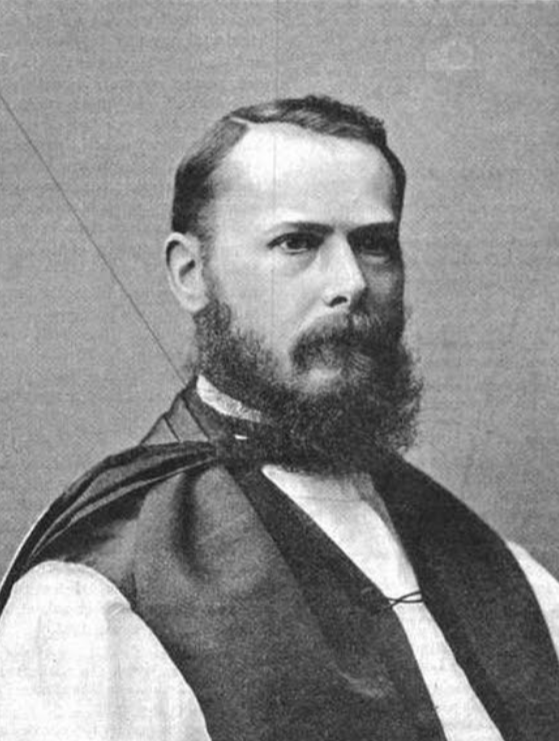
- Henry Perrott Parker
- Church: Church of England
- Diocese: Diocese of Eastern Equatorial Africa
- Installed: 18 October 1886
- Term ended: 26 March 1888
- Predecessor: James Hannington
- Successor: Alfred Tucker

Personal details
- Born: 21 September 1852
- Died: 26 March 1888 (aged 35)

The Rt Rev Henry Perrott Parker (born 1852, Upton Cheyney – d. Ussagara 1888) was an Anglican bishop in the second half of the 19th century.

== Life ==
Parker was educated privately in Bath and at Trinity College, Cambridge, where he gained his BA in 1871 and his MA in 1875.

Parker went out as a missionary to India, becoming chaplain to the Bishop of Calcutta in 1878. In 1879, he became the Secretary of the Church Mission Society North India Mission, an important position with some influence. However, he longed to be more directly involved with evangelism and missionary work. In 1885 he requested a transfer to central India to work among the Gondi people. Elevation to the episcopate as the second bishop of Mombasa came soon after (Bishop Hannington had been martyred on October 29, 1885) and he sailed for Africa, landing in Frere Town (a colony of ex-slaves near Mombasa at a missionary post headed by Alexander Mackay, that served as CMS headquarters in Central Africa) on November 27, 1886. He died of malaria while on a trip to Ussagara on March 26, 1888.

== See also ==
- William Taylor (missionary) — Missionary who became bishop of Africa in the 19th century.
- Robert Moffat (missionary) — Missionary in South Africa, who translated the Bible into the African Sechuana language.
- John McKendree Springer — Pioneering missionary instrumental in developing Methodism on the continent of Africa.

Anglican Communion titles
Preceded by James Hannington	Bishop of Mombasa; 1886–1888	Succeeded by Alfred Robert Tucker
