= Ferdinand Jühlke =

Prussian-German horticulturist

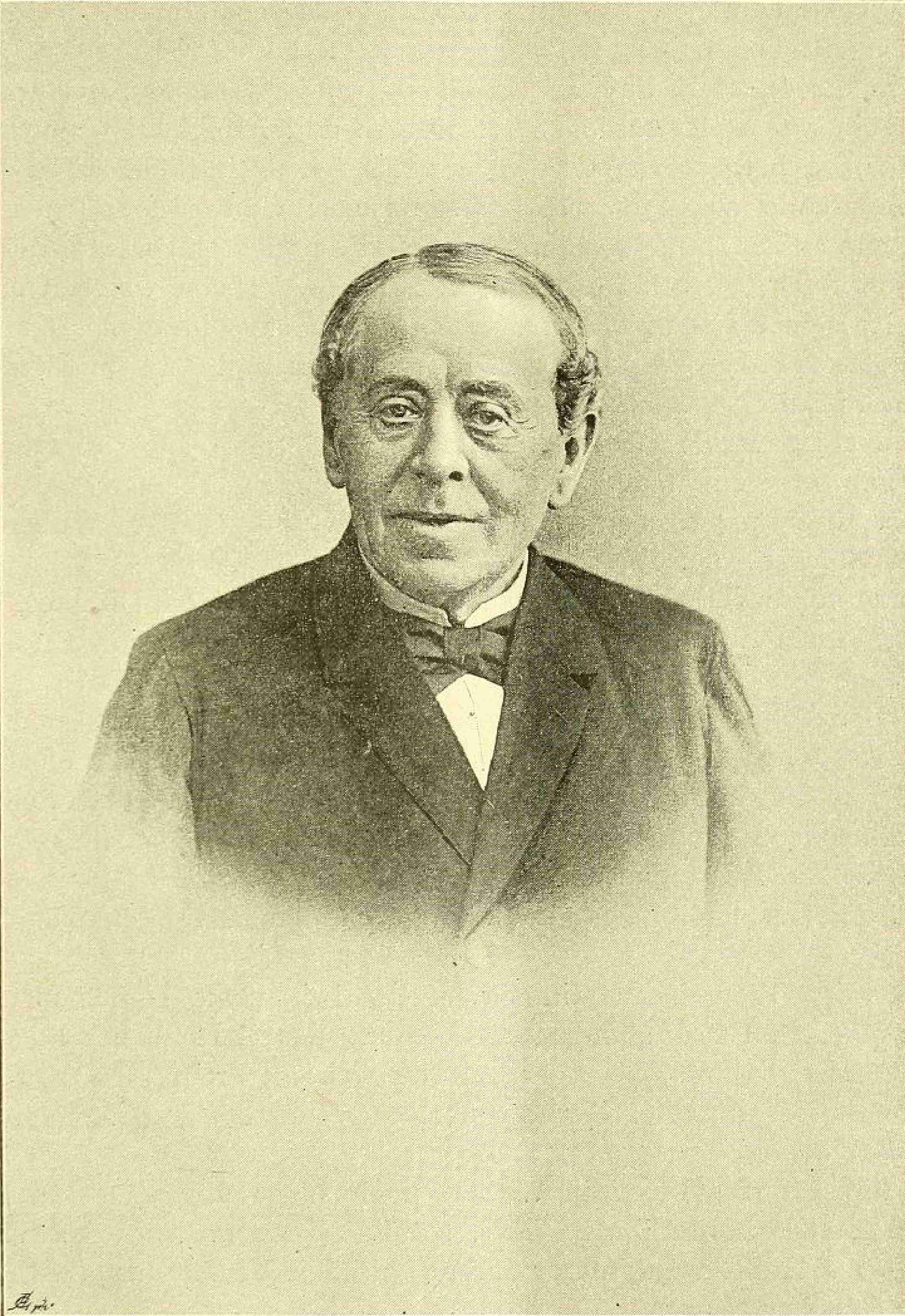
- 1893
- Born: Johann Bernhard Ferdinand Jühlke; 1 September 1815; Barth (Pomerania), Prussia
- Died: 12 June 1893 (aged 77); Potsdam, Brandenburg Germany
- Education: University Botanic Garden, Greifswald
- Occupations: Horticulturist/Pomologist; Royal Gardener; Teacher; Author
- Spouse: Maria Johanna Caroline Bladt 1817-1899
- Children: Betty 1852-1882; Carl Ludwig 1856–1886; Margarethe 1861-1919

Ferdinand Jühlke (1 September 1815 – 12 June 1893) was a Prussian (after 1871 German) horticulturist. He devoted much of his career to teaching and also wrote a number of highly influential books on gardens and garden design, though it is fair to add that his influence was greater in the Prussian north of Germany than in the south.

== Life ==
=== Provenance and early years ===
Johann Bernhard Ferdinand Jühlke, the third of his parents' three recorded sons together, was born on 1 September 1815 and baptised 16 days later, at Barth (Pomerania), in the extreme north of what would become Germany. Johann Martin Jühlke, his father, was a carpenter-joiner. The year of his birth was the year in which the entire province of Swedish Pomerania ceased to be Swedish and became part of Prussia, as part of the process whereby the nation-brokers at the Congress of Vienna confirmed the nation's recovery of "great power" status and the reversal of its near annihilation by the French Empire in 1806. Jühlke's parents divorced soon after he was born and his father remarried, following which the boys acquired a half-sister in 1818.

Ferdinand Jühlke attended the "Bürgerschule" (secondary school) in his home town where he received a basic education. Of more lasting significance was the education he received from his uncle who worked as the head gardener at a nearby manor house. He quickly schooled the boy in the practical aspects of gardening and also succeeded in instilling in his nephew a fascination with gardening and pomology. In 1830 Jühlke embarked on a more formal training programme at the Greifswald Botanic Garden of the University of Greifswald, a short distance to the south-east. The young course director, Professor Christian Friedrich Hornschuch, was keen to combine academic and botanical instruction with the aesthetic and artistic aspects of horticulture, both in his approach to teaching and in the way he had the gardens arranged. Hornschuch only launched the course, formally, in 1831. As one of its first students, Jühlke complemented his course work with his own extensive programme of private reading and self-study. Keen to master the intellectual context of his chosen speciality, his self-structured programme of complementary education included private tutoring in Botanic sciences, Physics, Maths and Quantitative Measurement.

During his time in Greifswald Jühlke developed a particular friendship with Johann Gottfried Langguth, the head gardener at the Botanic Garden between 1822 and 1855. Langguth, whom Professor Hornschuch also held in the highest regard, became for Jühlke an important longstanding counsellor and mentor.

=== Royal Agricultural Academy Eldena (1834-1854) ===
Recommended by Professor Hornschuch, in 1834 Jühlke was offered and accepted the position of "Academic Gardener" at the Royal Agricultural Academy Eldena. He was thereby placed in charge of a prestigious teaching and research academy, newly established by the university on the site of a former monastery (which had fallen into ruin since dissolution in 1535). Over a number of years took the opportunity to build up a Botanic Garden and a Pomology academy. There was also scope to develop an extensive horticultural research facility. The facilities provided institutional and practical support for teaching horticulture and plant care, supported by students who created and helped maintain appropriate herbaria and plant collections. He also organised an extensive programme of plant breeding trials, testing out new cultivars and methods. He established and maintained close relations with major commercial garden businesses, nurseries and botanic gardens, from which he obtained plant samples and seeds in order to try out new varieties and form conclusions as to their suitability for the climate found in the North German coastal regions.

At the beginning of his time in charge the focus was simply on teaching students the practicalities of garden development and maintenance, with a focus on fruit trees and grafting techniques. During the winter term of 1843/44 Jühlke started providing students with lectures on horticulture, and in 1846 he took on the newly created teaching chair in Horticulture. This enabled him to establish the Department of Horticulture as a stand-alone facility at the academy. By this time Jühlke was also sharing his expertise in horticulture with numerous contributions to specialist journals, through engagement in agricultural associations and participation in exhibitions. He became involved with the "Baltischen Verein zur Förderung der Landwirtschaft" ("Baltic Association for the Support of Agriculture"), and in 1845 became a founder member of the "Horticultural Association of New Western Pomerania and Rügen", himself serving as secretary of the association till 1858.

Fairly soon after taking over at Eldena, Jühlke met Otto von Bismarck, who had welcomed the opportunity to attend the Eldena Academy as part of his military service. As a young man Bismarck evidently believed that his future would involve inheriting and then improving and managing the extensive family agricultural estates on which he had grown up. Their meeting turned out to be the start of a life-long friendship. The men's surviving correspondence indicates that Bismarck would always retain a lively interest in horticultural matters, and that he would frequently seek advice on them from his former teacher at the Eldena Academy.

Jühlke also found time, during this period, to broaden his horticultural education through study trips. The longest of these appear to be the ones he undertook in 1844 and 1853. The first of these took in Germany and Belgium while the second covered England, Scotland, Belgium, the Netherlands, France and the southern parts of Germany.

In 1854 Jühlke accepted a government appointment as "Royal Inspector of Horticulture". He resigned this government post four years later, also in 1858 turning down the offer of a job as Director of the vast Imperial Botanical Gardens in Tiflis. Near-contemporary sources suggest that his decision on the matter was taken for "family reasons". His elder daughter had been born in 1852 and his son in 1856. It was also in 1856 that Jühlke published the first scientific description of the Pommerscher Krummstiel (apple), which at one stage became the most popular apple species in the region. There are suggestions that the apples, which may have originated on the Island of Rügen, were being cultivated (unclassified) in Mecklenburg at least as early as 1800.)

=== Nurseryman / businessman in Erfurt (1858-1866) ===
Instead he moved south within Germany, taking over the C. Appelius commercial nursery business in the centrally located Andreasvorstadt quarter of Erfurt which, like his home region, had become part of Prussia in 1815. The business had been founded by Carl Appelius in 1834, but under the direction of Ferdinand Jühlke it now expanded rapidly, soon becoming one of Erfurt's most economically successful horticulture businesses.

Following his arrival in Erfurt he also undertook a large amount of networking and voluntary work. In 1860, just two years after taking control of the C. Appelius business, he had been elected director of the Erfurt Horticulture Association. That same year, on 23 May, he was accepted as member of the city's Carl zu den drei Adlern Masonic lodge. He also became a member of the Erfurt city council and was appointed a district tax commissioner in respect of Land Tax

During these eight years in the private sector, Jühlke again found time for the occasional extended study trip abroad. The most extensive of these appears to have been in 1860, when he visited Austria, Bohemia, Moravia, Hungary and Silesia. He visited, in particular, various horticulture businesses in order to gather ideas for his own undertaking in Erfurt. Characteristically, he expended a huge amount of energy and commitment in developing his business, which evidently did not go unnoticed. In 1862 the king granted him the honour of becoming an [official] provider of royal garden supplies, seeds and plants. In June 1864 he was appointed Commissar of the Hamburg-based German Agriculture Society ("Deutsche Ackerbau-Gesellschaft") and elected president of the jury for agricultural products.

In December 1865, Ferdinand Jühlke explained his resignation from the directorship of the Erfurt Horticulture Association in a letter addressed to deputy-director, Ernst Benary:

- "Meanwhile, the remark of Mr. F. C. Heinemann carries for me additional and very serious significance. I am persuaded by it that I must resign my directorship and thank [the association] for the trust with which, till now, it has honoured me. ... The number of the sickening injuries which I have had to sustain in the interests of the exhibition [of Agricultural and Horticultural Products], are well known enough to those attending the meeting - only they will respect my resignation and share in my opinion that my peace of mind as a friend and the father of a family and must in the end be put ahead of any duty to put up with any more deliberate insults that impugn my honour".
- "Indeßen hat die Bemerkung des Herrn F. C. Heinemann für mich eine andere sehr ernste Tragweite, die mich bestimmt, mein Amt als Direktor der Versammlung zurück zu geben und für das Vertrauen zu danken, mit welchem dieselbe mich bisher beehrte ... Die Summe der kränkenden Verletzungen, die ich im Intereße der Ausstellung zu ertragen gehabt habe, sind ja der Versammlung hinlänglich bekannt - allein dieselbe wird meinen Rücktritt achten und die Ansicht theilen, daß mir mein Seelenfrieden als Familien-Vater und Freund am Ende doch höher stehen muß, als die absichtliche Fortsetzung von Beleidigungen, die mir Ehre und Pflicht verbieten, noch länger zu ertragen."

Ferdinand Jühlke, 29 December 1865

As chairman of the Erfurt Horticulture Association, Jühlke took a lead in organising the German Exhibition of Agricultural and Horticultural Products (den ..."Allgemeinen deutschen Ausstellung von Produkten des Land- und Gartenbaues"). The exhibition was held between 9 and 17 September 1865 in Erfurt, having been scheduled to coincide with the "Second Congress of German Gardeners, Botanists and Garden-enthusiasts for resolving Important Questions in Horticulture" (also held in Erfurt). The overall organiser of the event was another leading figure among Erfurt's commercial horticulturalists, Franz Carl Heinemann, though it is hard to discern from the sources whether or how far Heinemann's remit extended to the exhibition organised by Jühlke. Because of the huge international success of the exhibition, the Ministry for Agriculture conferred on Franz Carl Heinemann the title "Royal Prussian Director of Horticulture" ("Königlich Preußischer Gartenbaudirektor") later the same year.

These event were followed by a spectacular and very personal falling out between Jühlke and Heinemann, as a result of which Jühlke took the decision to resign his office as Director of the Erfurt Horticulture Association, which he did at the end of 1865.

=== Director of the Garden of the Royal Court and associated directorships (1866-1891) ===
Peter Joseph Lenné, the respected director of the Garden of the Royal Court, died in January 1866. The king appointed Ferdinand Jühlke to fill the vacancy with effect from 1 April 1866. Jühlke's responsibilities now included administration, care and maintenance of royal gardens throughout the Kingdom of Prussia, not only in the region surrounding the royal residence Potsdam, but also in the Rhine Province and, after 1868, Hessen, far to the west. Jühlke's new job also included directorship of the Royal Arboreal College at Alt-Geltow and of the Royal Horticultural College on the Potsdam Wildlife Park.

The Erfurt nursery business was taken over by Carl Putz, who had worked there for many years. The change was subject to the business trading as "F. Jühlke Nachfolger" ("F. Jühlke, Successor").

As successor to Peter Joseph Lenné, Jühlke implemented fundamental reforms at the Royal Horticultural College. The nineteenth century was one of massive political, economic and social change across Germany. One generally unremarked aspect of the changes was the way that Horticulture developed, by the 1860s no longer a mere footnote to Agriculture, but an important free-standing component in a modern rapidly expanding national economy. The academic study of Horticulture had to take account the changed requirements that resulted. One change for which the college urgently needed to adapt included the increasing specialisation within the commercial horticulture sector. There was no automatic overlap between a business that specialised in ornamental and exotic indoor plants, one that focused on vegetables or pomology, and one devoted to identifying and cultivating medicinal plants.

He also restructured the nearby Alt-Geltow Royal Arboreal College to make it more responsive to market requirements, during a period in which intellectuals and other opinion formers were rediscovering a German woodland heritage – part real: part imagined – possibly in response to accelerating industrialisation and urbanisation.

As director at the Garden of the Royal Court, Jühlke's work involved planning, organising and supervising designs and redesigns for royal gardens and the gardens of the nobility. He also found his services were much in demand as a planner of numerous municipal and private gardens. Examples include the garden-park surrounding the villa in Eisenach of his friend, the Mecklenburg popular novelist and poet Fritz Reuter. During the 1870s and 1880s he designed several municipal facilities for Barth (his birth town), which at the time was undergoing rapid expansion as a commercial port and brewing town. In Stralsund, the regional capital nearby, he was instrumental in implementing a long-standing ambition of many city-folk by constructing an impressive network of public parks and landscaped walkways. The development was made possible by the decommissioning, for serious defensive purposes, of the city's massive ramparts which had been constructed and then progressively extended through the centuries during which Stralsund was much fought over (most recently) between Poland, Pomerania, Brandenburg-Prussia, Sweden, France and others.

=== Later years ===
In 1880 Jühlke ended his teaching activities at the Royal Horticultural College. Two years later, on 26 October 1882 he accepted honorary membership of the Potsdam "Teutonia zur Weisheit" masonic lodge. On 1 April 1884 he celebrated fifty years of service in gardening and horticulture, and in 1891 the twenty-fifth anniversary of his service as director of the Garden of the Royal Court. On 1 July of that year, aged 75, he retired from his remaining positions. He died at Potsdam a little under two years later.

== Memberships ==
During his career Ferdinand Jühlke accumulated a number of memberships of horticultural and natural history clubs and associations. These included the German Pomology Association and the Erfurt-based Royal Academy of Charitable Sciences. Widely respected by fellow horticulturalists and scholars, he became a frequent presence at national and international horticulture festivals and garden exhibitions, judging and moderating the competitions.

== Family ==
Ferdinand Jühlke married Maria Johanna Caroline Bladt (1817-1899) on 14 May 1841. The bride was the daughter of a dance teacher. She came (like her husband) from Barth. The marriage was followed by the births of the couple's three recorded children:

- Betty was born on 17 January 1852. She died "in childbirth" on 18 December 1882, following the birth of her own first child.
- Carl Ludwig was born on 6 September 1856, and initially studied law. He later reinvented himself as an "Africa explorer" and was killed - some sources use the word "murdered" - in Kismayo. The early loss of Jühlke's son was followed by a powerful letter of condolence from his long-standing friend, the horticulture enthusiast, Chancellor Bismarck.
- Margarethe was born in 1861.

== Celebrations (selection) ==
- 1865 Golden Nation Medal (Prussia)
- 1872 Order of the Crown (3rd class)
- 1872 Knight Cross Order of Franz Joseph
- 1873 Commander Cross, Order of the Crown of Italy
- 1874 Vommander Cross (2nd class), Order of Vasa
- 1876 Order of the Red Eagle (3rd class with loops)
- 1876 Order of Albert the Bear Knight Cross (1st class)
- 1884 Royal Hohenzollern House Order Knight Cross
- 1884 Ferdinand Jühlke was made an honorary citizen of Barth
- 1890 ROrder of the Griffon (Mecklenburg) Honour Cross
- 1891 ROrder of the Crown (Prussia, 2nd class)
