= Joachim von Pfeil =

German explorer and colonist

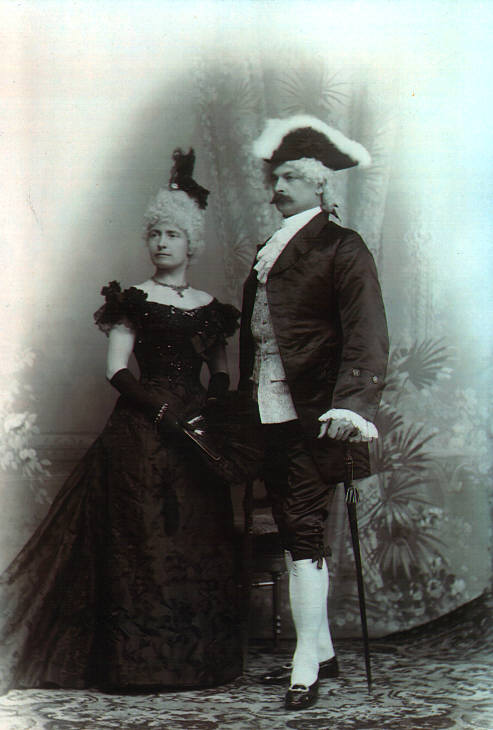
Joachim von Pfeil

Count Joachim von Pfeil (1857-1924) was a German explorer and colonist in Africa and New Guinea.

== Biography ==
He was born at Neurode, in Silesia, studied at the gymnasium of Göttingen. In 1873, he went to the Colony of Natal. There he learned the vernacular and stayed in the country four years. In 1879, after a visit to Europe, he settled in Orange Free State and with Wilson mapped the course of the Limpopo river. After falling ill, he returned to Germany. In 1884, having entered the employ of the Society for German Colonization, Pfeil went to East Africa with Carl Peters and Karl Ludwig Jühlke, and in 1886 succeeded the latter as general manager of the company in Somaliland. This post he resigned in 1887, and entered the service of the New Guinea Company. He died on March 12, 1924 in Friedersdorf.

== Works ==
- Studien und Beobachtungen in der Südsee (1899) Describes his travels and explorations in the South Seas.
- Vorschläge zur praktischen Kolonisation in Ostafrika (1887)
- Zur Frage der Deportation nach den deutschen Kolonien (1897)
