= James Hannington =

19th-century English Anglican missionary and saint

- former Bishop of Eastern Equatorial Africa
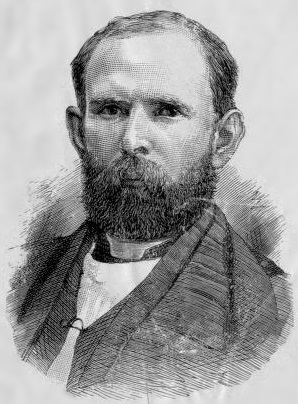
- James Hannington
- Church: Church of England
- Diocese: Diocese of Eastern Equatorial Africa
- Installed: 24 June 1884
- Term ended: 29 October 1885
- Successor: Henry Parker

Personal details
- Born: 3 September 1847 Hurstpierpoint, Sussex, England
- Died: 29 October 1885 (aged 38) Bunya, Busoga, Uganda

Sainthood
- Feast day: 29 October
- Venerated in: Anglican Communion
- Title as Saint: Bishop and Martyr
- Shrines: Bishop Hannington Memorial Church, Hove

James Hannington (3 September 1847 – 29 October 1885) was an English Anglican missionary and martyr. He was the first Anglican bishop of East Africa.

== Early life ==
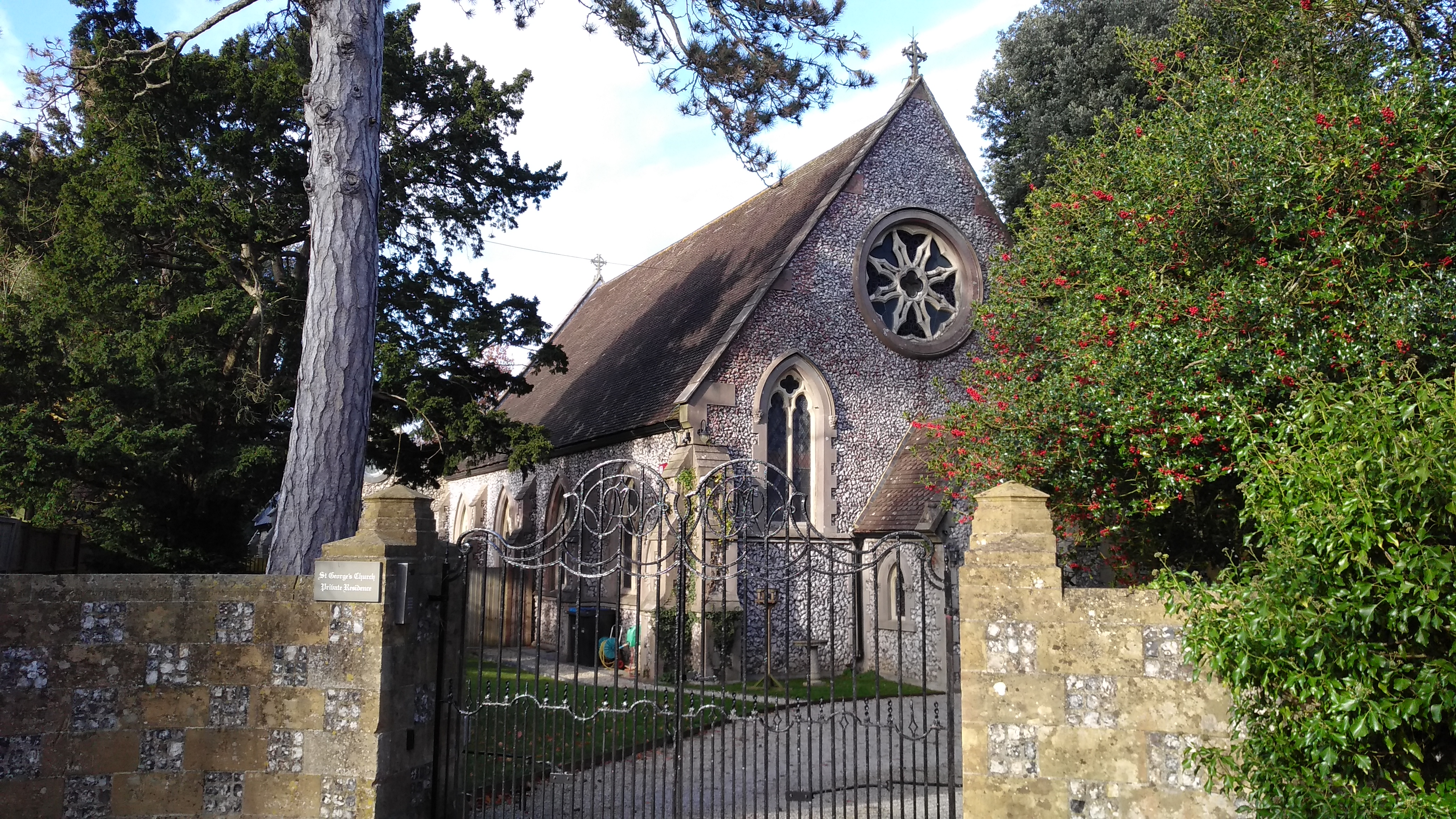
The former St George's Church, Hurstpierpoint

Hannington was born on 3 September 1847 at Hurstpierpoint in Sussex, England, about eight miles from Brighton, where his father ran a warehouse, and was part of the family that ran Hanningtons department stores. His father, Charles Smith Hannington, had recently acquired the property known as St George's. During his childhood, Hannington was a collector and he blew off his thumb with black powder.

For Hannington's early education a tutor had been engaged, but when he was thirteen he was sent to the Temple School at Brighton, where he remained for the next two-and-a-half years, although he was an indifferent student.

Hannington left school at fifteen to work in his father's Brighton counting house. He obtained a commission in the 1st Sussex Artillery Volunteer Corps in 1864 and rose to the rank of major. Under his training and supervision, his detachment won prizes at the annual camp competitions.

== Ministry ==
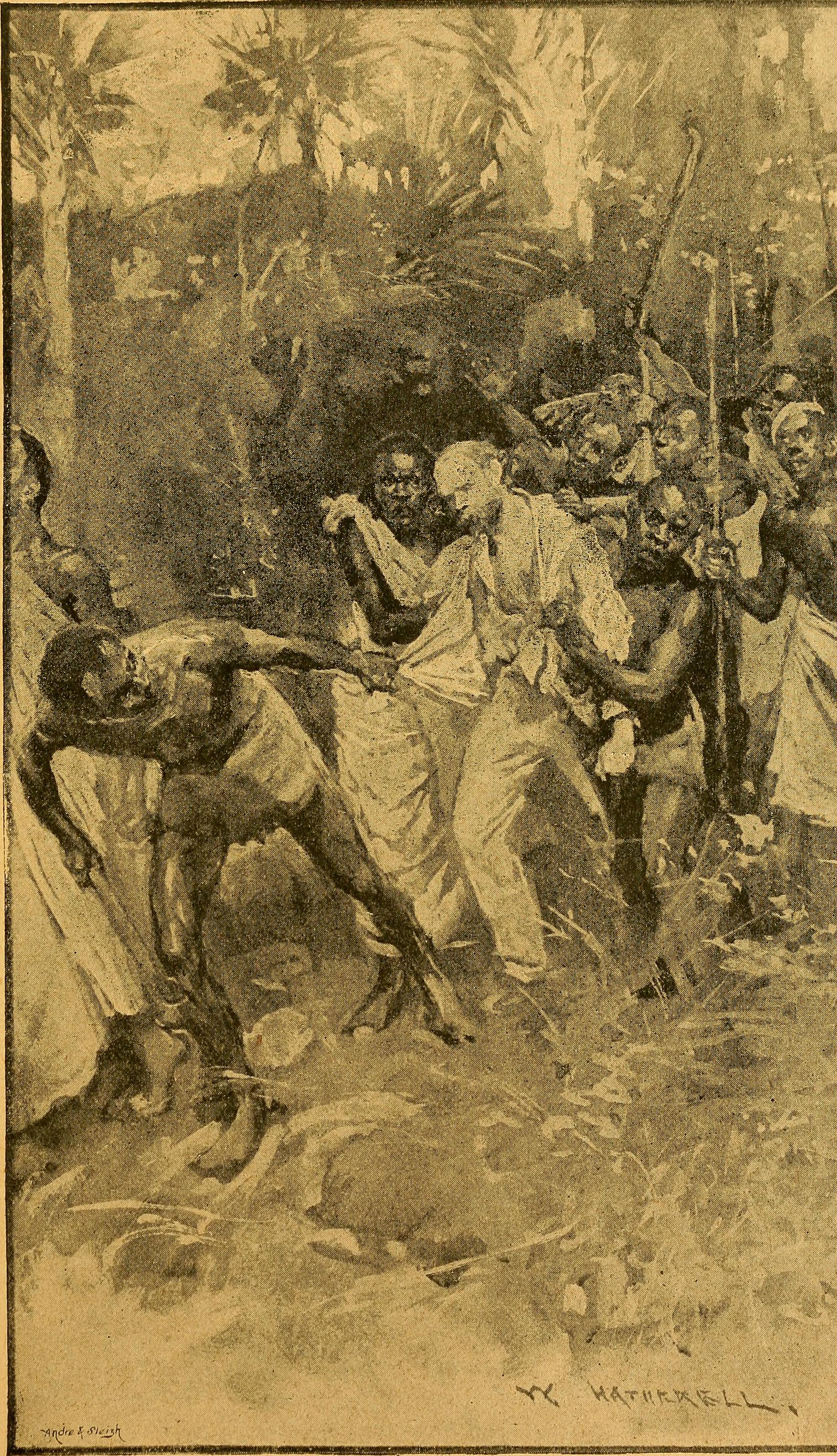
Seizure of Bishop James Hannington, by William Hatherell from The Story of Africa and its Explorers (1892)

The family were Congregationalists but joined the Church of England in 1867. In that year the chapel which Hannington's father had built on the grounds of his property in 1852 was licensed for Anglican services. At twenty-one, Hannington decided to pursue a clerical career, and entered university at St Mary Hall, Oxford; he was President of the Red Club and captain of the St Mary Hall Boat. In 1872, the death of his mother spurred a change in Hannington's life; he was awarded his BA, and on 1 March 1874 was made a deacon (by Frederick Temple, Bishop of Exeter, at Exeter Cathedral), and took a curacy of Martinhoe with Trentishoe, Devon. Having been ordained priest, in 1875 James became curate-in-charge at St George's, Hurstpierpoint where he stayed until volunteering for missionary work in East Africa in 1882. He had by then been married for five years.

Around 1882, Hannington heard of the murder of two missionaries on the shores of Lake Victoria. This led to him offering himself to the Church Missionary Society (CMS) and he left England on 17 May, setting sail for Zanzibar on 29 June, as the head of a party of six missionaries. Crippled by fever and dysentery, Hannington was forced to return to England in 1883.

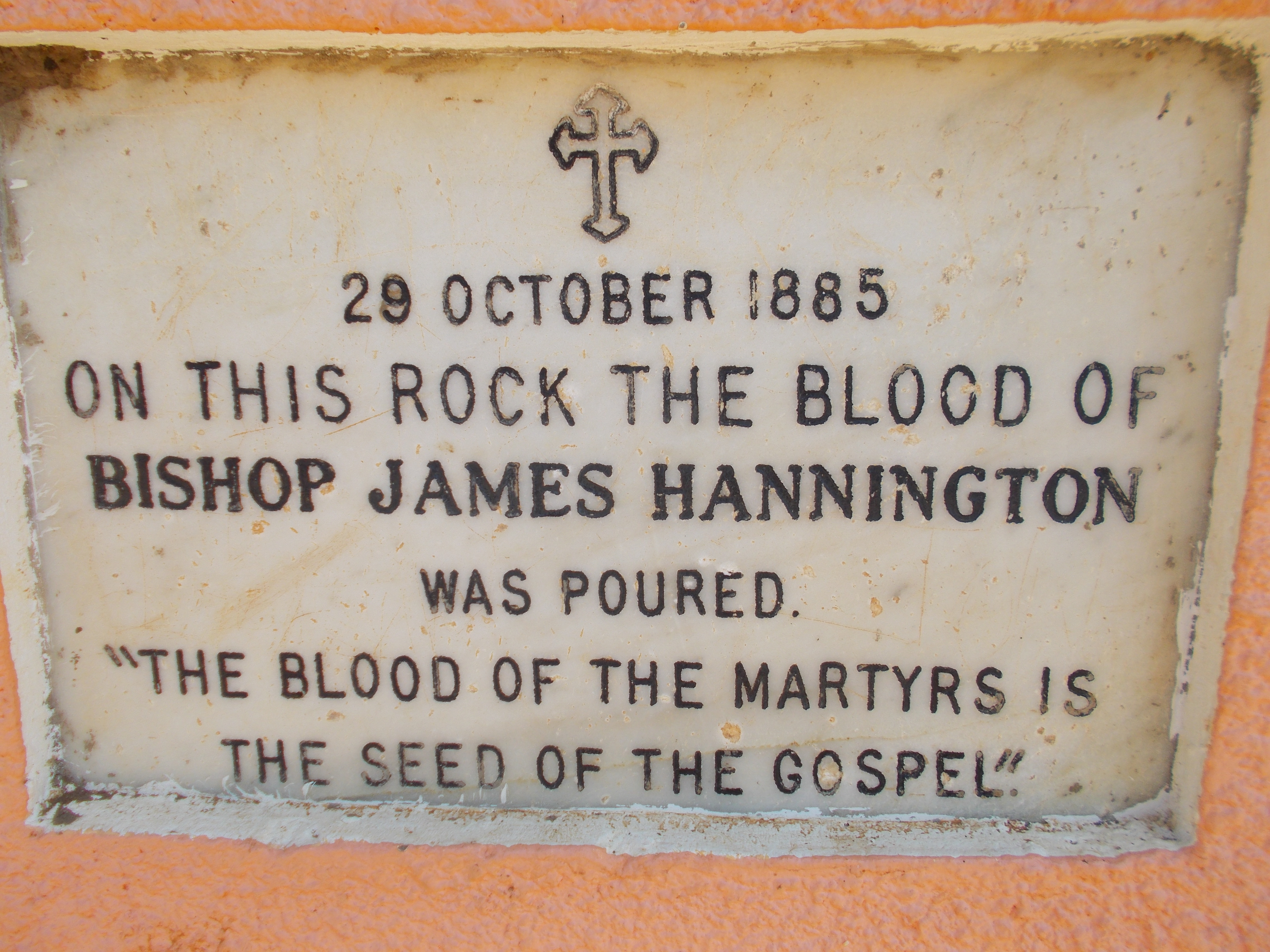
The martyrdom site

On 24 June 1884 (St John the Baptist's Day), having recovered, Hannington was ordained and consecrated a bishop by Edward White Benson, Archbishop of Canterbury, at St Mary-at-Lambeth, to serve the See of Eastern Equatorial Africa, and in January 1885, at age thirty-seven, Hannington again departed for Africa. His diocese included missions of the CMS at the coast and inland in Buganda. While there Hannington collected a number of shells which were described by E. A. Smith in two papers in the Annals and Magazine of Natural History.

After arriving at Freretown, near Mombasa, in Kenya, Hannington determined to pioneer a shorter and healthier highland road to Buganda, using Christian porters and undercutting the Arab slave route to the south. He was oblivious to the political consequences of traversing Busoga, a strategically sensitive area for the Buganda state. The sudden intrusion of German imperialism at the coast made the Kabaka of Buganda, Mwanga II, even more suspicious of Hannington's motives. An oracle (emmandwa) had said that Buganda's conqueror would come from the east. Mwanga forbade Hannington from continuing through Busoga and sent boats to take him to Sukumaland, but Hannington refused. Together with his team, he safely reached a spot near Lake Victoria on 21 October, but, under the orders of Mwanga II of Buganda, the missionaries were imprisoned in Basoga by Basoga chiefs.

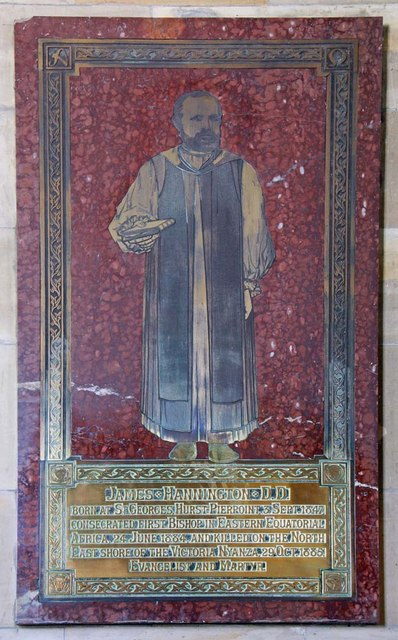
Hannington memorial in Holy Trinity, Hurstpierpoint

After eight days of captivity, Hannington's porters were killed on Mwanga II's orders, and on 29 October 1885, Hannington himself was speared in both sides in Kyando village. As he died, his alleged last words to the soldiers who killed him were: "Go, tell Mwanga I have purchased the road to Uganda with my blood."

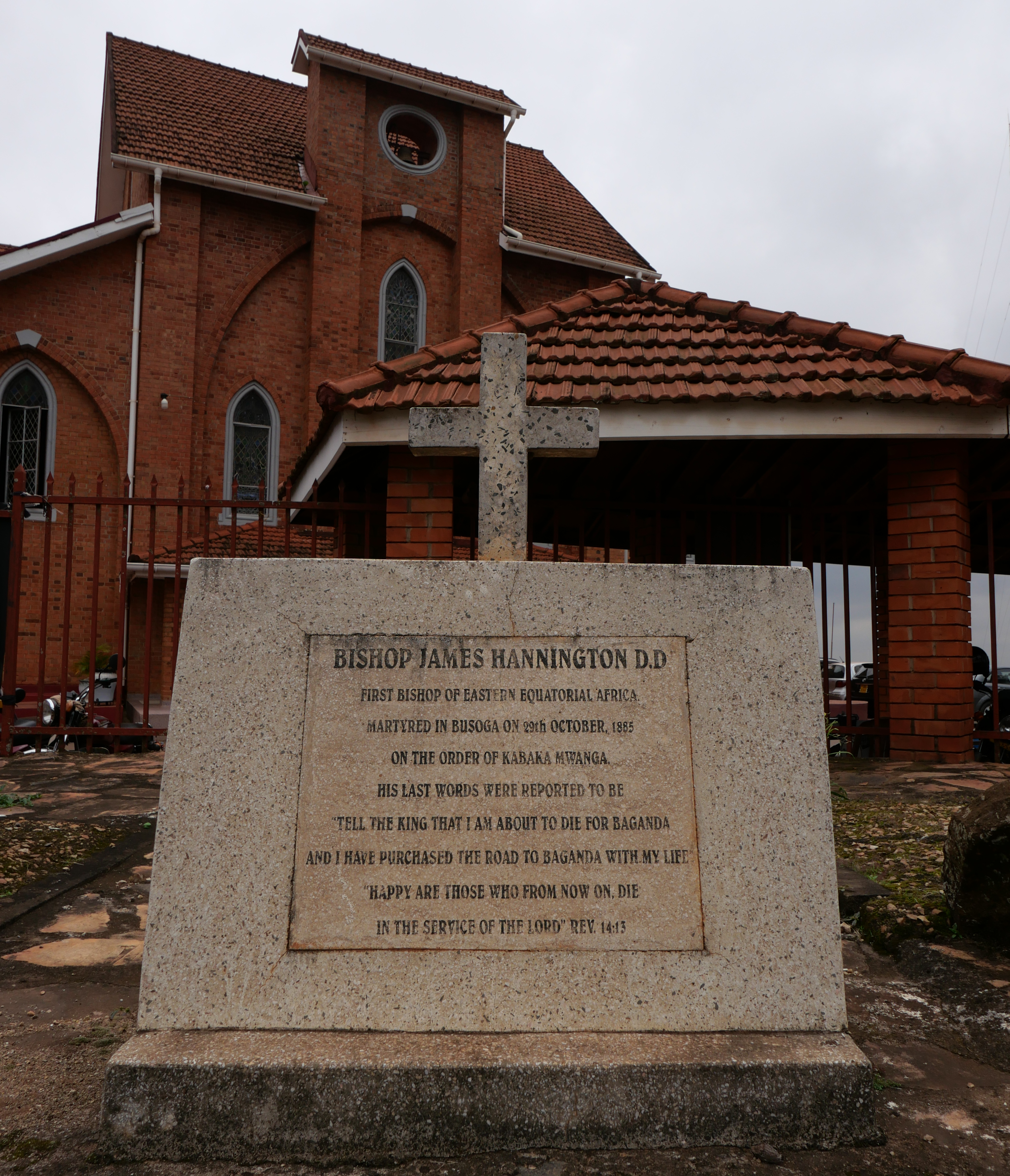
The tomb in 2024.

Widespread persecution of Christians followed, many being killed or sold to Arab slavers. Joseph Mukasa Balikuddembe, a Roman Catholic and an official at Mwanga's court, rebuked the king for the deed, and was beheaded for it. Hannington and his companions were among the first Martyrs of Uganda.

The location of Hannington's remains was divulged to Bishop Alfred Tucker in 1892 and on 31 December 1892, his remains were reburied at Namirembe. His tombstone His tombstone bear the inscription:

"FIRST BISHOP OF EASTERN EQUATORIAL AFRICA. MARTYRED IN BUSOGA ON 29th OCTOBER 1885 ON THE ORDER OF KABAKA MWANGA. HIS LAST WORDS WERE REPORTED TO BE "TELL THE KING THAT I AM ABOUT TO DIE FOR BAGANDA AND I HAVE PURCHASED THE ROAD TO BAGANDA WITH MY LIFE" "HAPPY ARE THOSE WHO FROM NOW ON, DIE IN THE SERVICE OF THE LORD" REV. 14;13

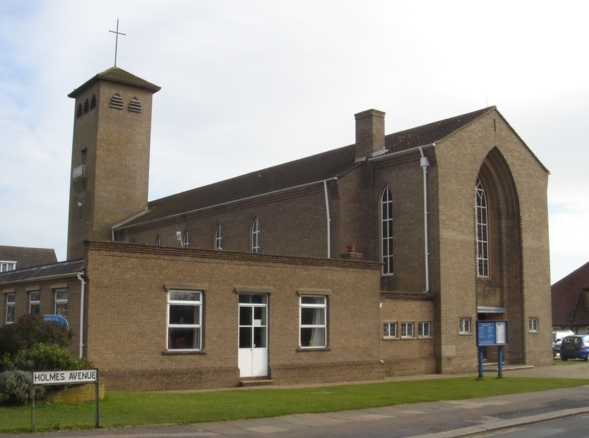
Bishop Hannington Memorial Church, Hove

He is commemorated by the Hannington memorial chapel in Namirembe Cathedral, Kampala, Uganda.

James Hannington is honoured in the Church of England and in the Episcopal Church on 29 October. A dedication stone, erected in his memory along with the Bishop Hannington Memorial Church, West Blatchington, Hove, England in 1938, bears the inscription "Thou hast turned my heaviness into joy".

== See also ==
- Anglican Church of Kenya
- Anglican Church of Tanzania
- Church of Uganda
- Bishop of Uganda
- Saints in Anglicanism
- Lake Bogoria (formerly Lake Hannington)
