= St Aldate's Church =

Coordinates: 51.750633°N 1.257791°W

St Aldate's
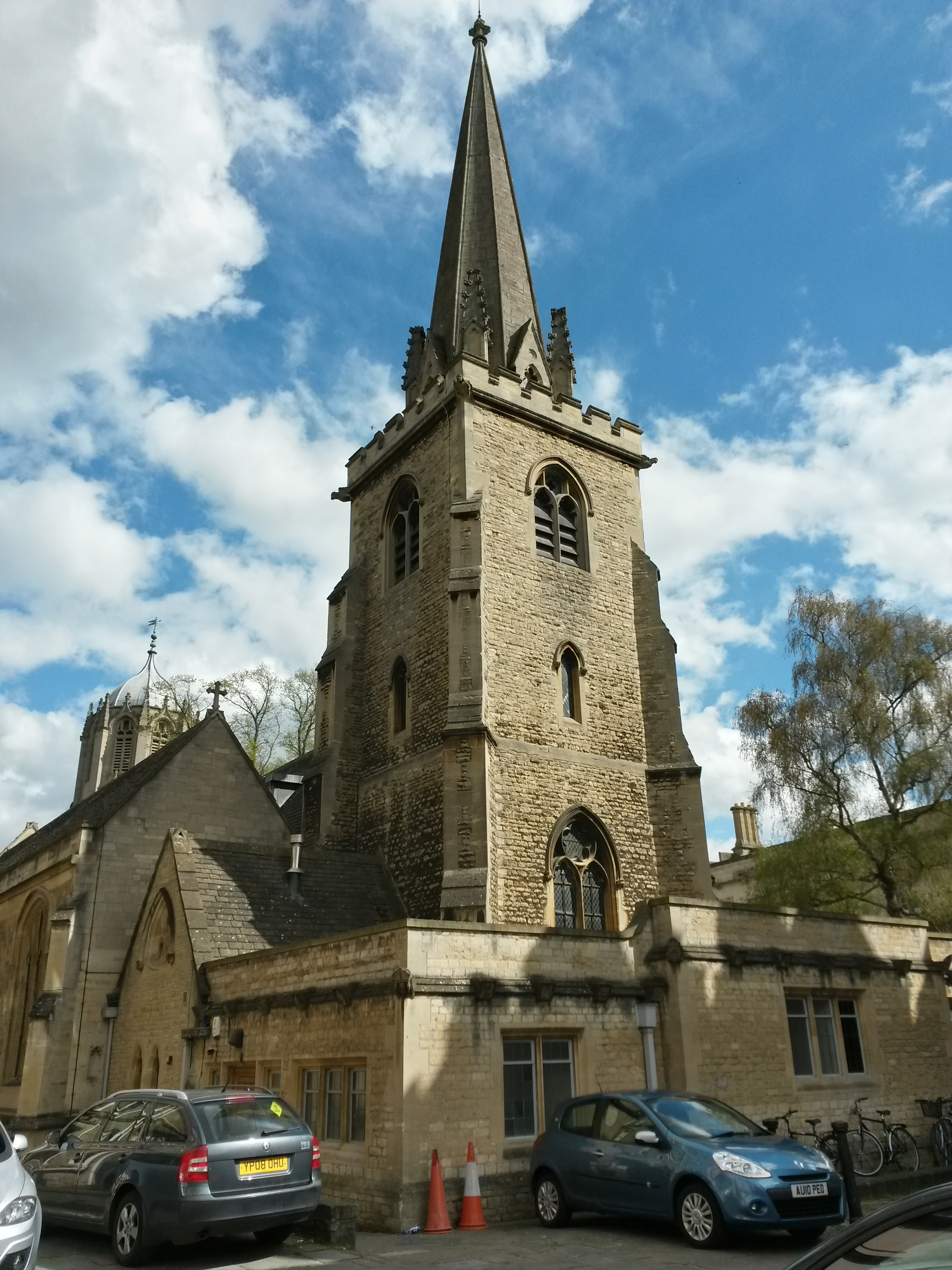
- St Aldate's
- OS grid reference: SP 51355 05999
- Location: St Aldate's, Oxford
- Country: England
- Denomination: Church of England
- Churchmanship: Low Church / Charismatic Evangelical
- Website: www.staldates.org.uk

Administration
- Province: Province of Canterbury
- Diocese: Diocese of Oxford
- Archdeaconry: Archdeaconry of Oxford
- Deanery: Oxford
- Parish: St Aldate's

Clergy
- Rector: Stephen Foster

St Aldate's is a Church of England parish church in the centre of Oxford, in the Deanery and Diocese of Oxford. The church is on the street named St Aldate's, opposite Christ Church college and next door to Pembroke College. The church has a large congregation and has a staff team of about 30 which includes clergy, pastoral and administrative staff. The offices of the Rector and other members of staff are at 40 Pembroke Street.

== History ==
The site has been used for Christian worship dating back to the Saxon era. It may have been one of three churches within the monastic precinct of Saint Frideswide. The first major constructions, in the 12th century, were the nave and chancel, the central part of the building as it now stands. Since then the church has been extended and remodeled at various times. The original tower built during the 13th century was entirely rebuilt in 1873.

The south and north aisles - either side of the nave - were added in the 14th and 15th centuries respectively in order to accommodate the growing population of Oxford.

The modern church was developed during the nineteenth century, with a remodeling of the interior in 1832. Most notably, during the 46 year ministry of Canon Alfred Christopher, a highly regarded leader from 1859 to 1905, the north and south chancel aisles and the vestry were added.

Further remodeling was completed in 2002. The pews were removed to create more seating room for a growing congregation, under-floor heating, carpet, Jerusalem stone tiles, wood flooring, and a state of the art AV system with projector screens and television monitors were installed to create a modern venue for a living church.

Most noticeably, the North Wall was knocked open to create a spacious glass vestibule that opened the church up to the main road of St Aldate's Street. In addition, the graveyard at the front has been landscaped to open up a garden at the front of the church for tourists and passers-by.

== Parish ==
St Aldate's is a parish in the Deanery and Diocese of Oxford and therefore comes under the administrative care of the Bishop of Oxford. The church is governed locally by the church leadership (clergy and lay ministers) and the parochial church council, in line with the Church Representation Rules as laid out in the Synodical Government Measure 1969.

== The Church ==
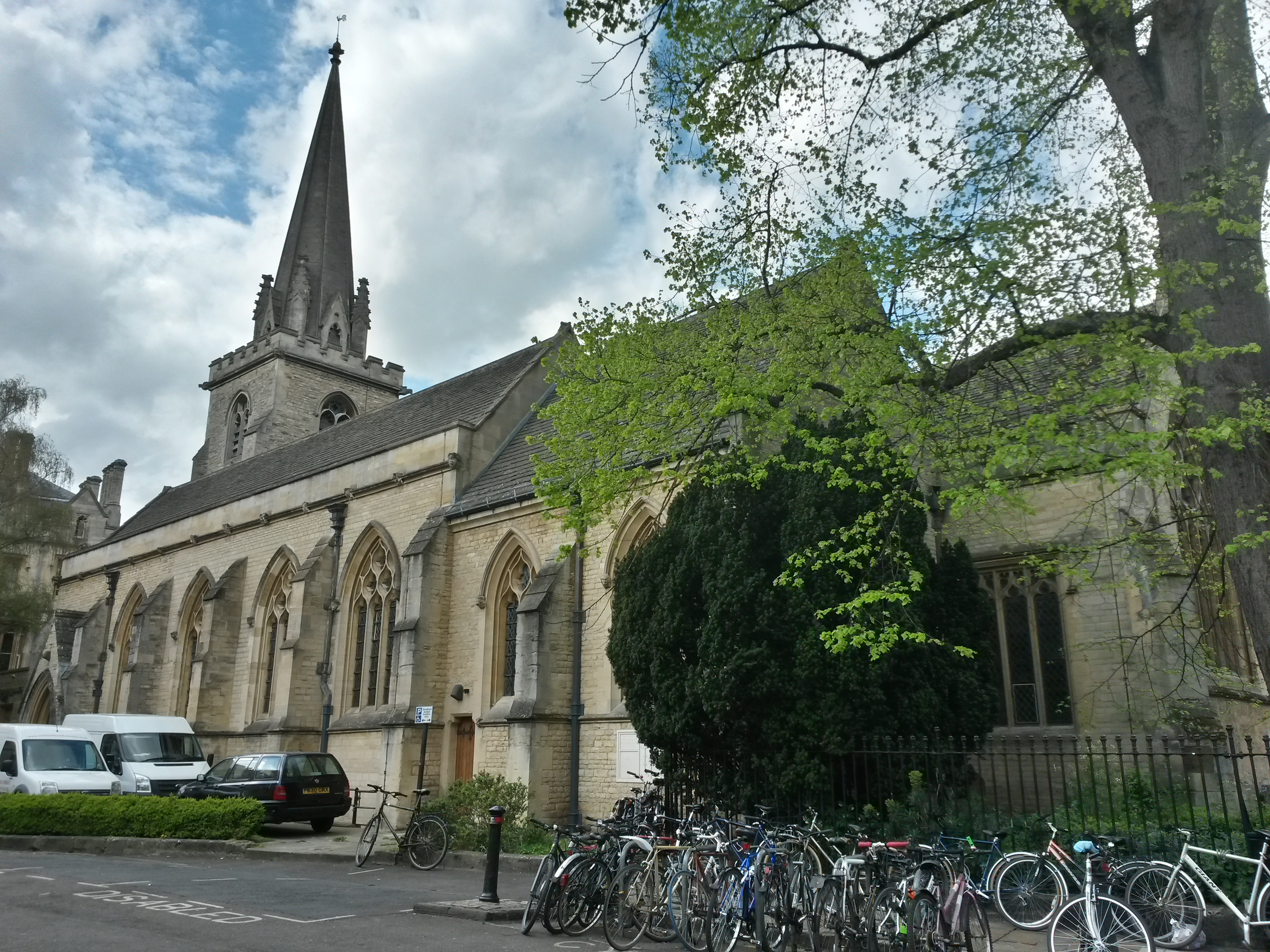

Most of the congregation live outside the Parish. Members are drawn from throughout the city and surrounding villages, as far as Grove, Heyford and north towards Banbury. Due to the nature of academic life in Oxford, the congregation is very fluid and it is estimated that up to 30% change each year.

There is a range of ages and stages in life in the congregation, with a number of older people, young families, families with teenagers and single people, youth and students. During University terms up to 400 students attend the Sunday services, and during the vacations many tourists and visitors join the congregation.

St Aldate's encourages members of the congregation to be involved in the various aspects of the church life and ministry areas and relies heavily on a large number of volunteers who help in the following areas: prayer, administration, production, catering, maintenance, counselling, stewarding and teaching.

== Catacombs Youth and Prayer Centre ==
In October 2009 the Catacombs building at 12 Littlegate Street was re-opened by the Bishop of Oxford. Following extensive redevelopment, the ground floor is now a youth centre and the basement has been dedicated as a prayer room for Oxford. In March 2010 the Oxford Prayer Room hosted the first 24-7 week of prayer open to all churches in Oxford, with representatives from over 24 churches attending over the course of the week.

== Love Oxford ==
In 2006 St Aldate's helped to coordinate an event in Oxford that brought together more than 30 churches in the city for an open-air service in Broad Street on a Sunday morning in June. This event, known as Love Oxford, sought to ‘declare God’s praises’, ‘pray for the peace of the city’ and ‘hear the word of God preached’. It became annual and in 2009 moved to South Park on Headington Hill; about 4,000 people attend.

== Channel 4 documentary ==
In June 2009, Channel 4 broadcast a documentary, Revelations - How to find God, on the subject of the Alpha course held at St Aldate's earlier that year. The programme is one of eight episodes in the series and was made by Jon Ronson, who was "afforded complete access" and compiled the final product from around 120 hours of footage.
