= Alfred Christopher =

English clergyman and cricketer

Alfred Millard William Christopher (20 August 1820 – 10 March 1913) was an English clergyman who, as a young man, was a cricketer who played in three matches for Cambridge University in 1843 that have been designated as first-class. He was born in London and died in Oxford.

Christopher played as an opening batsman in two out of his three first-class games, but it is not known whether he batted right- or left-handed; his matches included the 1843 University Match.

Christopher taught at a school in Calcutta, India after graduation from Cambridge University, where he was at Jesus College. He then returned to England, where he was ordained as a Church of England clergyman. From 1859 to 1905 he was the rector of St Aldate's Church in Oxford, where he supervised a substantial expansion of the church, and from 1886 to his death he was an honorary canon of Christ Church, Oxford. He was a prominent member of the evangelical wing of the Church of England and an influential figure in Oxford for more than half a century.

He died on 10 March 1913 and was buried in St Sepulchre’s Cemetery, Oxford.
