= Alexina Ruthquist =

Scottish missionary

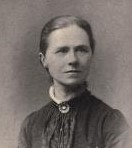
- Born: Alexina McKay; 8 September 1848; Scotland
- Died: 5 September 1892 (aged 43); HSwMS Elektra
- Education: Miss Milne's seminary in Edinburgh
- Occupation: Missionary
- Employer(s): Ladies' Society for Female Education in India and South Africa
- Known for: Missionary
- Spouse: Johan Ruthquist

Alexina Ruthquist (née McKay, 8 September 1848 – 5 September 1892) was a Scottish missionary.

== Life ==
Ruthquist was born in Fordyce, Aberdeenshire in Scotland in 1848 as Alexina McKay. She was named after her mother and her father was the Reverend Murdoch McKay. Her father was based at the Free Church of Scotland in nearby Rhynie, Aberdeenshire.

She served for eleven years in India before she married the Swedish missionary Reverend Johan Ruthquist in October 1866. She left Nagpoor and joined him at the small village of Amarwara. She lived near her sister Maggie who had also married a Swedish missionary. In November 1889 she gave birth but the child, Mary Juanita, died within two weeks. She and Maggie decided to bring up an abandoned child called Benjamin. 1892 they opened a dispensary in Amarwara.

She died on 5 September 1892 en route to Sweden on HSwMS Elektra. She was buried in Suez.
