= Ussagara =

Settlement in Tanzania

Coordinates: 6.11°S 37.5°E

Ussagara is a settlement in the Nguru Mountains region of Morogoro District, Tanzania. Henry Perrott Parker, the second Bishop of Mombasa, died there in May 1888.
