= Amos Betungura =

Anglican bishop in Uganda

- Born: Amos Betungura; 1927; Nakapiripirit District
- Died: 28 November 2008 (aged 80–81); Mbarara
- Education: Uganda Christian University
- Occupations: Evangelist, deacon
- Known for: Bishop
- Title: Bishop

Amos Betungura was an Anglican bishop in Uganda.

Betungura was educated at Uganda Christian University and ordained deacon in 1957 and priest in 1960. He was consecrated Bishop of Ankole on 6 December 1970. He died in 2008.

== Church Ministry and Episcopal Leadership ==
Betungura was consecrated as Bishop of Ankole on 6 December 1970. he was the 2nd Bishop of Ankole.

Under his leadership, the number of archdeaconries and parishes in the Ankole Diocese increased significantly enchancing access to Anglican worship and pastoral care for local communities. His tenure was characterised by church growth, clergy training and expanded mission outreach.

== Institution Building and Community Impact ==
=== Ruharo Mission Hospital ===
In 1981, during his episcopacy, Betungura was instrumental in founding Ruharo Mission Hospital in Mbarara city a community hospital affiliated with the Church of Uganda that provides general care, surgical services, outreach programs and rehabilitation services across the Ankole sub-region. The hospital later expanded efforts such as the Organised Userful Services (OURS) program for children with disabilities, reflecting Betungura's vision for integrated healthcare and social support.

=== Writings and Cultural Engagement ===
He was also known for his writings on Christian, marriage, local culture and interpretation of traditional practices through Christian theological lens. His work included books on the history of the Ankole people, marriage customs and translations into local languages, contributing to both ecclesial reflection and cultural discourse in Uganda.

He also initiated the translation of the bible from English to Runyankore-Rukiga as it was first translated to Rutoro and Luganda.

== Death and Legacy ==
Amos Betungura died on 28 November in Mbarara after battling with prostate cancer. He was buried at St.James Cathedral in Ruharo. At his funeral, President Yoweri Museveni praised him as a unifying figure who bridged religious and cultural divides and strengthened community life in Uganda.

== See also ==
- Bishops of Uganda
- Anglican Church of Uganda
- Wilderforce Kityo Luwalira
