= List of Reformed Theological Seminary people =

This is a partial list of notable people associated with Reformed Theological Seminary, a non-denominational Reformed seminary with campuses in Jackson, Mississippi; Orlando, Florida; Charlotte, North Carolina; Atlanta, Georgia; and Washington, D.C.

== Faculty and staff ==
- Thomas Ascol
- Greg Bahnsen
- Gregory Beale
- Harold O. J. Brown
- Steve Brown
- Knox Chamblin
- R. Scott Clark
- Kevin DeYoung
- Ligon Duncan, chancellor and John R. Richardson Chair of Systematic Theology
- Sinclair Ferguson
- John Frame
- George C. Fuller
- Richard C. Gamble
- Frank A. James III, former Orlando campus president
- Tim Keller
- Douglas F. Kelly
- Paul Kooistra
- Michael J. Kruger, Charlotte campus president and Samuel C. Patterson Professor of New Testament and Early Christianity
- Robert Letham
- Richard Lints
- Michael A. Milton, former chancellor and Charlotte campus president
- John Muether
- Ronald H. Nash
- Roger Nicole
- Richard L. Pratt, Jr.
- Frank Reich, former Charlotte campus president
- O. Palmer Robertson
- Morton H. Smith
- R.C. Sproul
- Donald W. Sweeting, former Orlando campus president
- Derek Thomas
- Willem A. VanGemeren
- Bruce Waltke

== Alumni ==
- Nathan Ahimbisibwe, Ugandan Anglican bishop
- John Dekker, Dutch-American missionary to Papua New Guinea
- Gary DeMar (M.Div., 1979), theologian and activist
- Kenneth Gentry (M.Div., 1977), theologian
- Alan J. Hawkins (M.A., 2002), Anglican bishop
- Paul Jennings Hill (M.Div.), murderer
- James Sik Hung Ling (D.Min., 1996), Hong Kong Salvation Army officer
- Amos Magezi (M.Div., 2000), Ugandan Anglican bishop
- Keith Mathison (M.A.), theologian
- Rob Munro (D.Min., 2008), British Anglican bishop
- Frank Reich (M.Div.), professional football player and coach
- Tullian Tchividjian (M.Div., 2001), pastor and author
- Derek Thomas (M.Div., 1978), Welsh-American pastor
- Johnson Twinomujuni, Ugandan Anglican bishop
- J. Steven Wilkins (M.Div.), pastor
