= Yoramu Bamunoba =

Inaugural Bishop of West Ankole

- Bishop of West Ankole
- Church: Anglican Church of Uganda
- Diocese: West Ankole
- In office: 1977–2007

Orders
- Consecration: 1977

Personal details
- Born: July 1931 (age 95)
- Education: University of East Africa

Yoramu Bamunoba (born July 1931) was the inaugural Bishop of West Ankole from Uganda serving from 1977 to 2007.

Bamunoba was born at Kacuncu Village, Keihangara, Ibanda District. He was ordained in 1966. He taught at Bishop Stuart College and was Chaplainat Makerere University.

== Early life and education ==
He was educated at Nkondo Primary School from 1945 to 1950 and received his Primary Leaving Certificate, he later joined Mbarara High School in 1951 to 1953. From Mbarara High School, in 1954 he joined Busoga College Mwiri where he got the Overseas Cambridge School Certificate. In 1957, he joined Kyambogo Teacher Training College today known as Kyambogo University.

== Ministry ==
Bamunoba ministry started while at Bishop Stuart Teacher's Training College as a tutor where he was driven to join Buwalasi Theological College from where he was admitted to the University of East Africa (Makerere Campus) and he graduated with a Degree in Theology and Philosophy. In 1973 he completed his Master's Degree in The Cults of Spirits in Ankole.

From 1974 to 1976, he was the Chaplain of St. Francis Chapel, Makerere University. It was from here that he was called to work as a Bishop hence starting the work in 1977.

== Personal life ==
Bamunoba started work as Bishop during the regime of Idi Amin.

Bamunoba has six children.

== See also ==
- Church of Uganda
- Johnson Twinomujuni
- William Magambo
- Janan Luwum
