= George Bagamuhunda =

Ugandan bishop

George Bagamuhunda is an Anglican bishop in Uganda: From 2014 to 2022 he served as the 5th Bishop of Kigezi. He handed over office to the Right Rev. Gaddie Akanjuna who was consecrated on 29 May 2022 at a service held at Kigezi High School.

== Early life and education ==
Bagamuhunda was born in 1958 in Langara village in current day Rubanda district. He attended Rujanjara primary school for his primary education Kigezi college school Butobere for secondary education and later Bishop Tucker Theological college in Mukono where he graduated with a diploma in theology and was ordained priest in 1983.

Bamuhunda also has a certificate and dilpoma in water engineering plus a masters' degree in Water engineering which he got in 1995.

== Career ==
He served as a chaplain at Kihanga Secondary school. In 2007, he was appointed as the provincial coordinator for planning by Archbishop Henry Luke Orombi and in 20210, he was appointed provincial secretary of the church of Uganda and in 2024 he was conscrated as Bishop of Kigezi diocese.

== See also ==
- Church of Uganda
- Edward Bamucwanira
- George Katwesigye
