= Onesimus Asiimwe =

Ugandan Anglican bishop

The Right Reverend Onesimus Asiimwe
- Bishop of North Kigezi Diocese
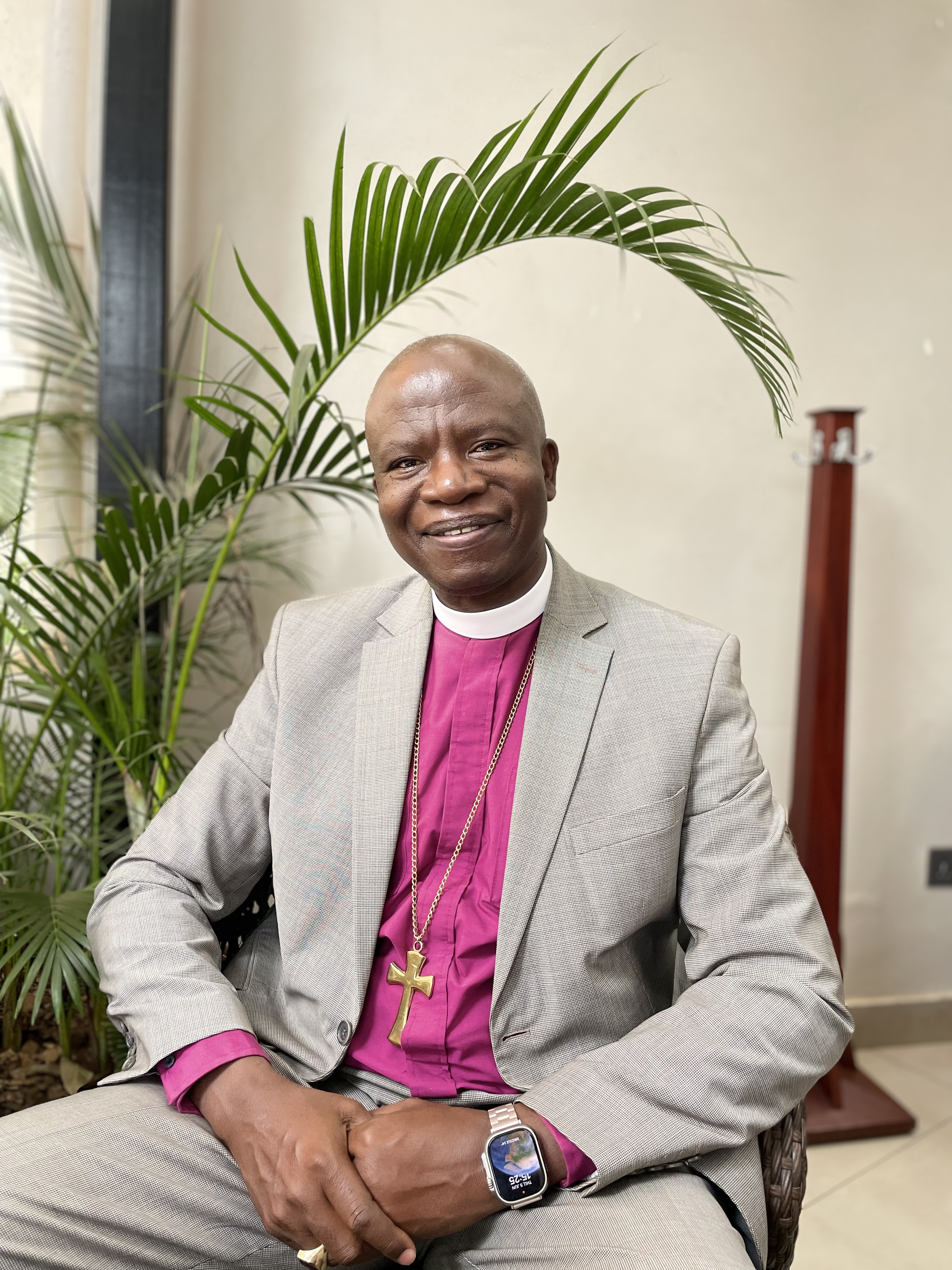
- Church: Church of Uganda
- Diocese: North Kigezi
- In office: 2023–present
- Predecessor: Benon Magezi
- Successor: Incumbent
- Other post: Chaplain of Makerere University (2017–2023)

Orders
- Ordination: 2 October 2011 (diaconal); 7 October 2012 (priestly) by Bishop George Katwesigye
- Consecration: 12 March 2023 by Archbishop Stephen Kaziimba Mugalu

Personal details
- Born: 24 April 1965 (age 60) Mparo, Rukiga District, Uganda
- Spouse: Florence Asiimwe (m. 1993)
- Children: 3

Onesimus Asiimwe (born 24 April 1965) is a Ugandan Anglican bishop, theologian and former Chaplain of Makerere University. He has served as the 6th Bishop of North Kigezi Diocese, which is under the Church of Uganda, since his consecration on 12 March 2023. Asiimwe succeeded Bishop Benon Magezi, who died in June 2021.

Prior to his consecration as bishop, Asiimwe served as Chaplain of Makerere University and as Chaplain to Archbishop Henry Luke Orombi. He has been affiliated with various Anglican organizations throughout his career, including the World Council of Churches and the Global Anglican Future Conference (GAFCON). In August 2025, he was appointed Regional Secretary for East Africa by GAFCON's Primates' Council.

== Early life and education ==
Asiimwe was born in Mparo, Rukiga District (then part of Kigezi), Uganda, on 24 April 1965. He was the youngest of eleven children born to Lay Reader Samwiri and Samalie, both of whom influenced his Christian upbringing. He was baptized on 6 June 1965 and confirmed on 13 September 1984.

A young Bishop Onesimus Asiimwe with a childhood friend.

Asiimwe attended Kihanga Boys' School for primary education from 1973 to 1979. He completed his O-Level at Kigezi High School and A-Level at Makerere College School.

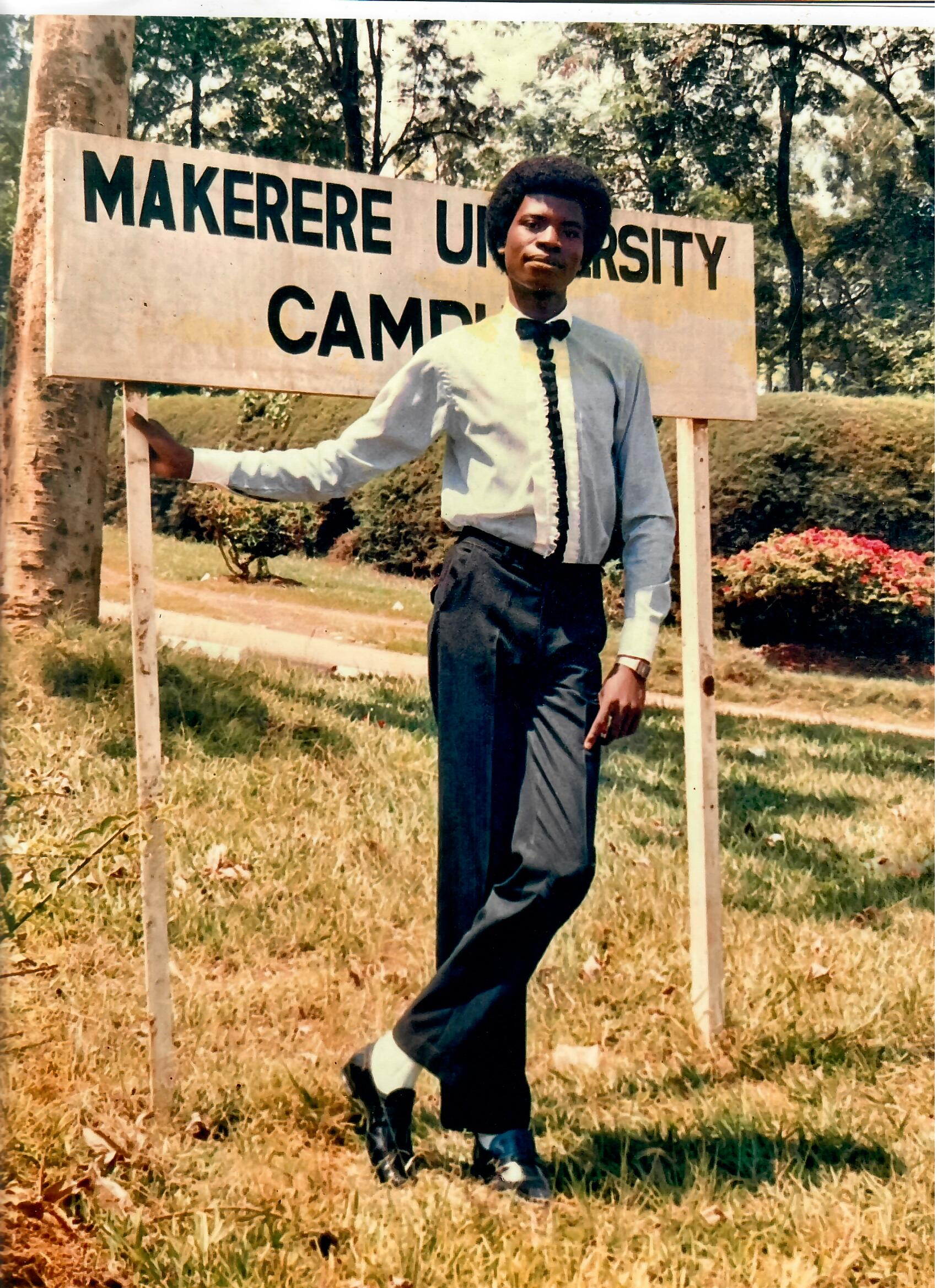
Bishop Onesimus Asiimwe, while a student at Makerere College School

In 1988, Asiimwe enrolled at National Teachers' College, Kabale District, graduating in 1990 with a Diploma in Education. He then earned a Bachelor of Education degree from Makerere University in 1995. In 2010, he completed a Master of Divinity degree from Bishop Tucker School of Divinity and Theology at Uganda Christian University.

== Career ==
=== Teaching career ===
Following his graduation from Makerere University, Asiimwe worked as a teacher at Kigezi High School, eventually becoming head of the Fine Arts department. In the following years, from the 1990s to 2002, he served as an Advanced Level Art examiner for Uganda National Examinations Board (UNEB), a period that coincided with significant education reforms in Uganda, which included the introduction of Universal Primary Education in 1997.

=== Ordained ministry ===
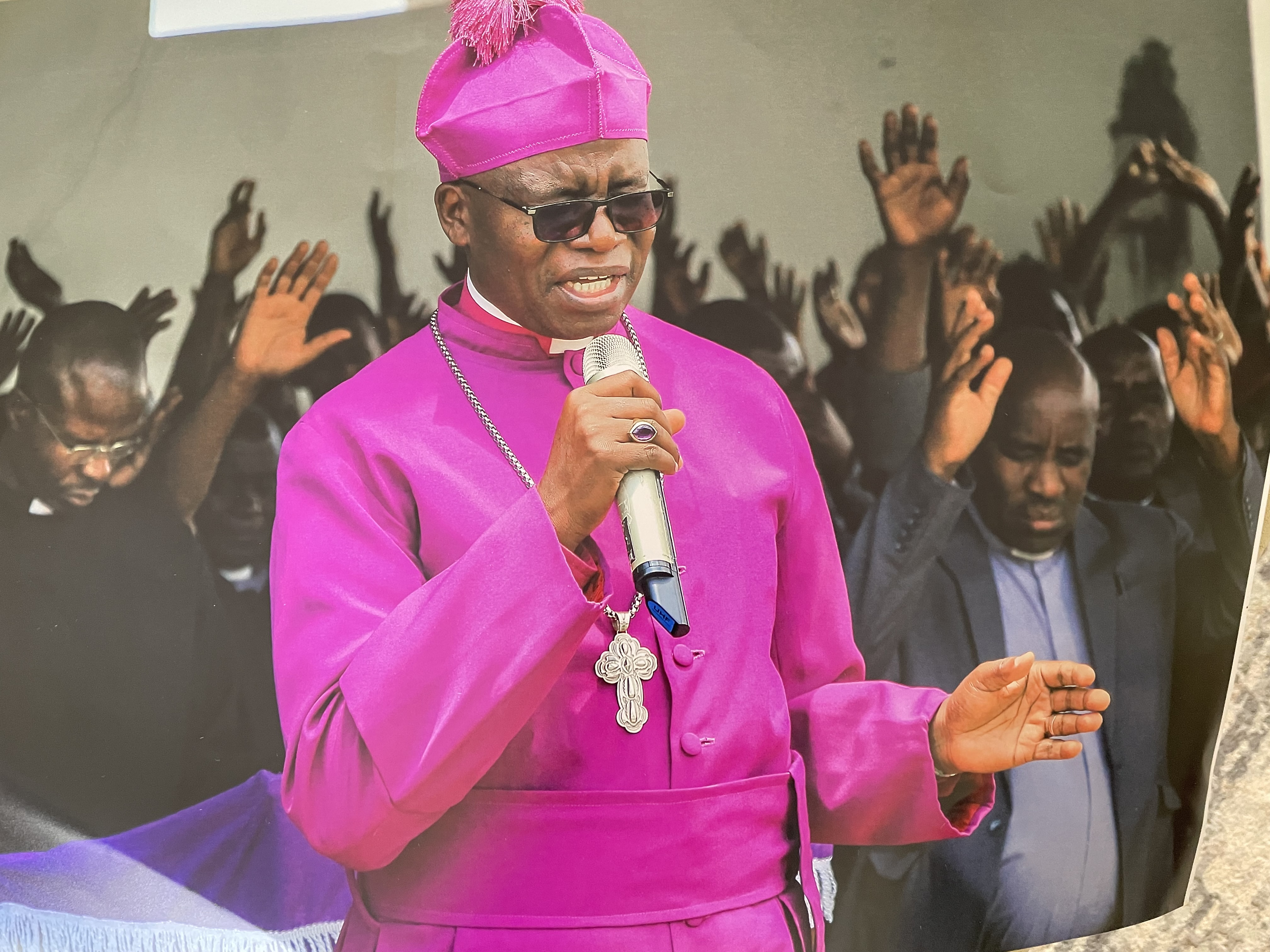
Bishop Onesimus Asiimwe before a congregation at the Diocesan church.

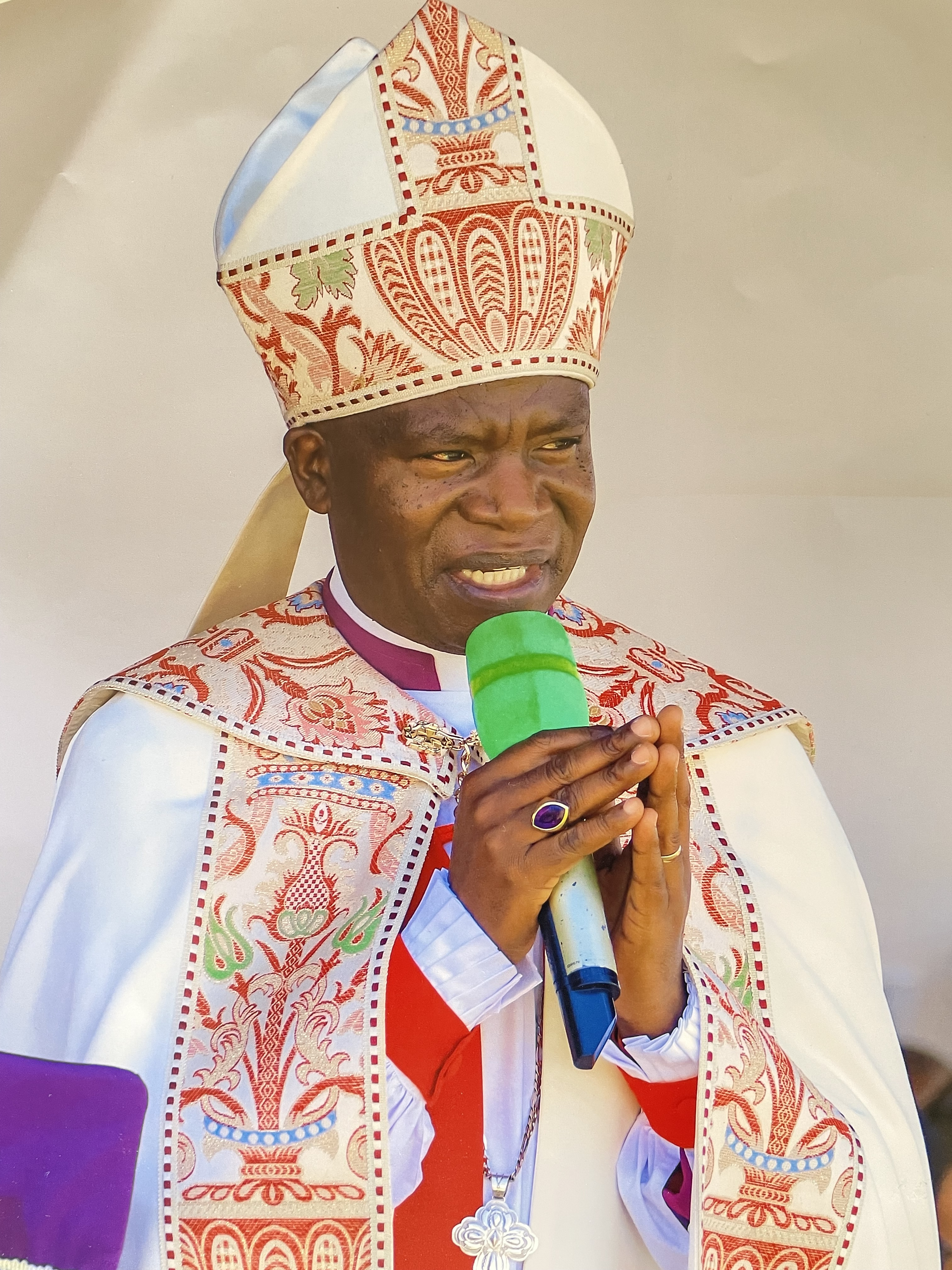
Bishop Onesimus Asiimwe delivering a sermon.

Following a personal spiritual awakening in 1988, Asiimwe dedicated his life to Christian ministry, with a strong focus on youth and social transformation. Despite initial resistance from church leaders due to his miracle-centered Church ministry, Asiimwe nonetheless rose through the ranks—serving as Chaplain to the Archbishop of Uganda.

In 2002, Onesimus Asiimwe was invited by Bishop Livingstone Mpalanyi Nkoyoyo to be the Coordinator of the Provincial Healing, Deliverance, and Intercessory Prayer Ministry.

In 2006, Asiimwe was appointed Chaplain to Archbishop Henry Luke Orombi, a role noted as potentially the first time a layperson held such a position for an Archbishop within the Global Anglican Communion at that time.

In 2010, he enrolled and later earned a Master of Divinity degree at Bishop Tucker School of Divinity and Theology – Uganda Christian University.

In 2011, Asiimwe was ordained a Deacon on 2 October at St. Peter's Cathedral, Rugarama, Kabale, a place that once questioned his ministry but later embraced his calling.

In 2012, he was ordained a Priest on 7 October by Bishop George Katwesigye. His ensuing ministry included participation in international training programs at Haggai Institute (Singapore), Billy Graham School of Evangelism, and Anglican Leadership Institute (South Carolina, USA).

From 2017 to early 2023, he served as Chaplain of St. Francis Chapel at Makerere University. During his tenure at St. Francis Chapel, Asiimwe (then Reverend) participated in a mission partnership focused on reaching youth in Uganda. In this phase, Asiimwe was also a strong advocate for the Government's affirmative action in curbing the spread of the coronavirus and the locust plague in the agricultural sector.

Asiimwe also served as the Provincial Youth and Students Coordinator, where he helped develop the Provincial Annual Youth and Students Convention (PAYSCO) program. He served as a member of the Central Committee of the World Council of Churches (WCC), representing Uganda on the policy reference committee at its headquarters in Geneva, Switzerland (World Council of Churches Central Committee, 2008).

=== Episcopacy ===
On 18 January 2023, the House of Bishops of the Church of Uganda elected Asiimwe as Bishop of North Kigezi Diocese. He was consecrated on 12 March 2023 at Emmanuel Cathedral Kinyasano, Rukungiri District, by Archbishop Stephen Kaziimba Mugalu. During the ceremony, Archbishop Emeritus Henry Luke Orombi highlighted Asiimwe's passion for evangelism.

In August 2025, the Primates' Council—the governing body of the Global Anglican Future Conference (GAFCON)—appointed Asiimwe as Regional Secretary for East Africa.

Asiimwe has publicly expressed views aligned with conservative biblical interpretations regarding sexuality.

== Personal life ==
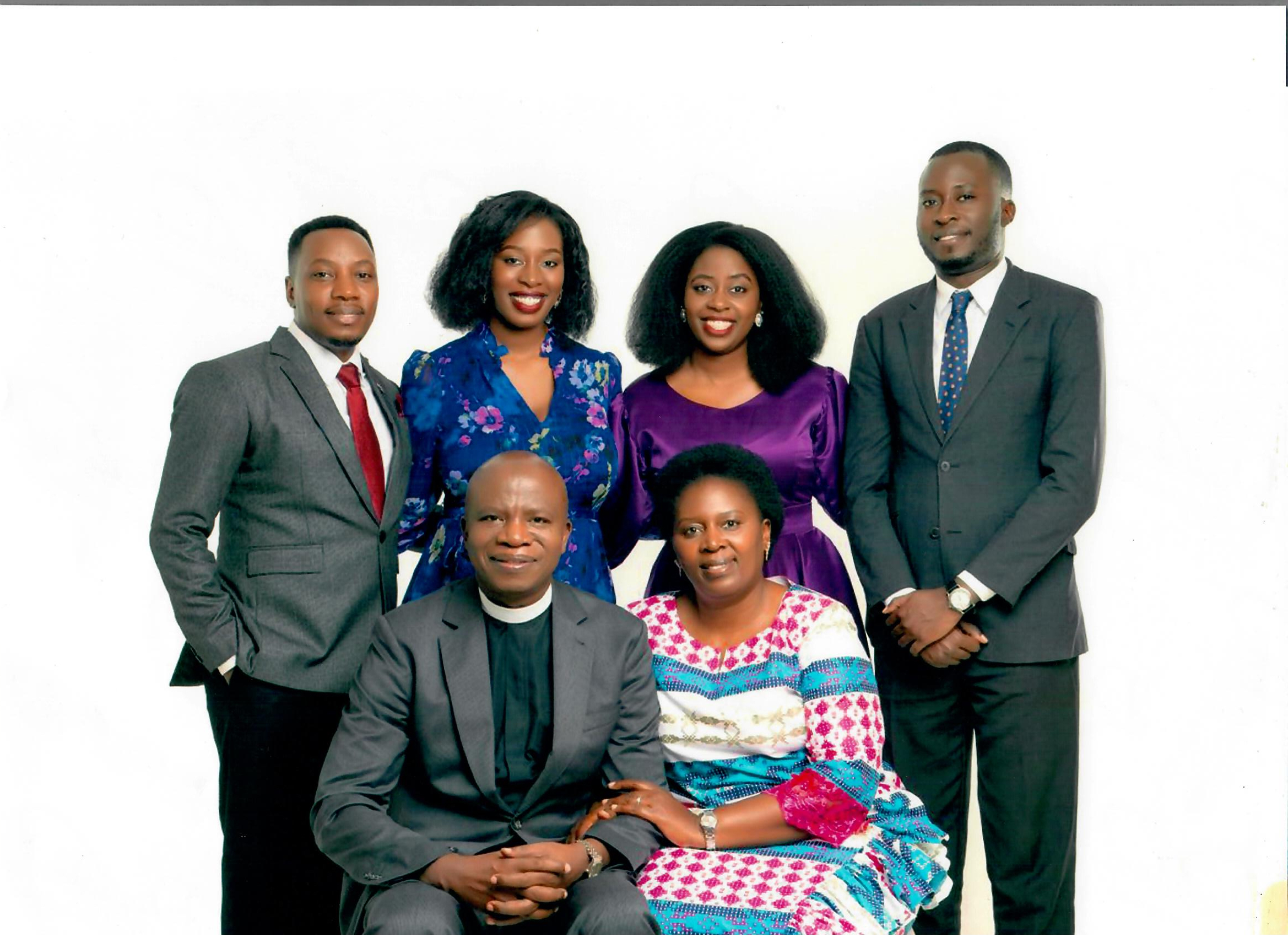
Bishop Onesimus with his wife and children.

Asiimwe married Florence on 13 September 1993. They have three children: Daudi Mwesigwa Asiimwe, Majorie Kiconco Asiimwe (married to Aine Taremwa), and Ruth Ariho Asiimwe. A significant personal event, described in sourced accounts, was a spiritual transformation in January 1988, following which he abandoned alcohol and cigarette use.

Religious titles
Preceded by Benon Magezi	Bishop of North Kigezi Diocese; 2023–present	Incumbent
