= Muhoozi =

Muhoozi is a surname. Notable people with this surname include:

- Muhoozi Kainerugaba, Ugandan military officer, Chief of Defence Forces of UPDF
- David Muhoozi, Ugandan military officer and lawyer, former Minister for Internal Affairs
- Alice Muhoozi, Ugandan presidential speech writer
- Alfred Muhoozi, Ugandan Anglican bishop
