= Samuel Balagadde Ssekkadde =

Ugandan Anglican bishop (died 2024)

- Bishop of Namirembe
- Church: Anglican Church of Uganda
- Diocese: Namirembe
- Appointed: 1994
- Term ended: 2009
- Predecessor: Misaeri Kitemaggwa Kauma
- Successor: Wilberforce Kityo Luwalira

Orders
- Consecration: 1994

Personal details
- Born: 31 January 1944 Kitekannya, Luweero District, Uganda
- Died: 14 October 2024 (aged 80) Kisubi Hospital, Uganda
- Denomination: Anglican
- Spouse: Allen Ssekkadde
- Children: Biological and adopted children
- Education: Makerere University; Birmingham University

Samuel Balagadde Ssekkadde (31 January 1944 – 14 October 2024) was a Ugandan Anglican bishop who served as the Bishop of Namirembe from 1994 to 2009. He was widely recognised for his leadership in the Church of Uganda and his commitment to pastoral ministry.

== Early life and education ==
Samuel Balagadde Ssekkadde was born on 31 January 1944 to Michael Kyobe Kiyingi and Tolofaiya Kyobe Kiyingi in Kitekannya village, Luweero District. He grew up in a devout Christian family that nurtured his faith from an early age. Ssekkadde attended Semuto Preparatory School, followed by Ndejje Secondary School and Lubiri Secondary School. He then went on to study at Iganga Teachers College and later earned a Bachelor's of Arts in Social Work and Social Administration from Makerere University. He also completed a Master's in Development Administration from Birmingham University in the United Kingdom.

== Ordination and early Ministry ==
At the age of 24, in 1968, Ssekkadde felt called to Christian ministry. He received theological training at Bishop Tucher Theological College in Mukono and further studies at the Mindolo Ecumenical Foundation in Zambia. Ssekkadde was ordained a priest in 1967 and served in various capacities with the Church of Uganda, including as principal of Uganda Martyrs Seminary at Namugongo and as Diocesan Secretary of Namirembe Diocese.

== Bishop of Namirembe (1994-2009) ==
In 1994, Ssekkadde was consecrated as the fourth Bishop of Namirembe, succeeding Misaeri Kitemaggwa Kauma. During his episcopacy, which lasted until 2009, he oversaw spiritual leadership, pastoral care, and development projects within the diocese, one of the oldest and most influential dioceses in the Church of Uganda.

Ssekkadde encouraged clergy to undertake self-help and income-generating projects to ensure financial security, emphasising self-reliance among church leaders. He was known for his forthright leadership style and engagement in matters affecting both clergy and laypersons.

Upon retirement in 2009, he was succeeded by Wilberforce Kityo Luwalira as Bishop of Namirembe.

== Legacy and impact ==
Ssekkadde's leadership left a lasting impact on Namirembe Diocese through initiatives in clergy welfare, pastoral care, and church administration. His emphasis on self-reliance among the clergy and his readiness to speak on church matters continued even after his retirement, earning him respect among peers and the wider Anglican community.

== Death and funeral ==
Ssekkadde died on 14 October 2024 at Kisubi Hospital after being rushed there due to a sudden illness. The cause of his death was reported as a heart attack. He was 80 years old at the time of his death.

His funeral service was held at St. Paul's Cathedral Namirembe, attended by the Clergy, government officials, and members of the public, and he was laid to rest at the Namirembe Cathedral, a burial site for several notable Anglican clergy. President Yoweri Museveni and Anglican Church leaders publicly commemorated his service.

== Personal life ==
Ssekkadde was married to Allen Ssekkadde, and together they celebrated 50 years of marriage. The couple raised both their biological and adopted children, and they were widely seen as an inspirational family within the Anglican Community.

== See also ==
- Church of Uganda
- Namirembe Diocese
- Wilberforce Kityo Luwalira
