= Cranmer Mugisha =

Cranmer Mugisha is an Anglican bishop in Uganda: he has been Bishop of Muhabura since 2007. He retired in July 2022 after serving for 15 years and was replaced by Godfrey Mbitse.
