= Mbarara High School =

Coordinates: 0.6155°S 30.6335°E

- Mbarara, Mbarara District; Uganda

Information
- Type: Public Middle School and High School (8-13)
- Motto: Mugume N'amani
- Established: 1911
- Principal: Ahimbisibwe Hamm
- Enrollment: 1,200
- Athletics: soccer, rugby, track, tennis, volleyball.

Mbarara High School (MHS), also known as Chaapa, is a boys-only boarding middle and high school located in Ruharo Mbarara City in Mbarara District in Western Uganda.

== Location ==
The school is located in the Western Ugandan city of Mbarara, approximately 270 kilometres (170 mi), by road, southwest of Kampala, the capital and largest city in the country. The school campus is located in the suburb of Ruharo, approximately 2 kilometres (1.2 mi), along the Mbarara-Ishaka Road, west of the central business district of Mbarara. The coordinates of MHS are: Latitude:-0.6155S; Longitude:30.6335E.

== History ==
It was established in 1911 by Anglican, Christian missionaries affiliated with the Church of England. Mbarara High School is the oldest secondary school in Western Uganda. It has both ordinary level and advanced level classes. The land on which the school was built is owned by Ankole Diocese, of the Church of Uganda. While the church has ownership and control of the school, the Uganda Government, through the Ministry of Education, contributes to the school's budget. The Kumanyana protest movement of the 1940s, which demanded equality for the Bairu people of Ankole with the Hima, had its roots at the school.

== Notable alumni ==
The school has many alumni, many of whom are active in Uganda's public and private sectors. The notable, among them include the following:

- President Yoweri Museveni - President of Uganda 1986–Present.
- Amanya Mushega - Former Secretary-General of the East African Community.
- Elly Tumwine - Former Commander of the Army in Uganda (1986 - 1989). Member of Parliament (MP), representing the Uganda People's Defense Force (UPDF) (1986–Present). High-ranking UPDF officer.
- Andrew Mwenda - journalist and founder of the Independent Magazine.
- Sabiiti Muzeyi - military officer and police officer
- Kenneth Kimuli - comedian, playwright and journalist
- Zeddy Maruru - military pilot and retired military officer
- Francis Takirwa - military officer
- Tumusiime Rushedge - surgeon, pilot, novelist, cartoonist and newspaper columnist
- Charles Oboth Ofumbi - Ugandan Interior Minister
- Emmanuel Karooro - educator, academic and academic administrator, and the Vice-Chancellor at Ibanda University
- Eriya Kategaya - lawyer and politician
- Sam Kutesa - politician and lawyer, former President of the United Nations General Assembly
- Levi Karuhanga - military officer
- Bright Rwamirama - politician and retired army officer
- Mwesigwa Rukutana - lawyer and politician
- Fred Ruhindi - lawyer and politician
- Yoramu Bamunoba, Bishop of West Ankole, 1997-2007
- Ernest Shalita, Bishop of Muhabura, 1990-2002

== See also ==
- Education in Uganda
