= Benon Magezi =

Ugandan bishop (1960–2021)

Benon Magezi (1960 – 15 June 2021) was an Anglican bishop in Uganda.

== Early life and education ==
Magezi was born in 1960 in Bwanda village, Buhunga sub-county in Rukungiri District. His mother died when he was 10 years old and he grew up under the care of his step mother whom he says his inspired him into christianity. He went to Kashenyi Primary School and later Jinja College for his O-level. He was enrolled into Bishop Barham College for a certificate in theology in 1989. He studied a Bachelors Degree of Theology and graduated at Uganda Christian University in Mukono in 2010.

== Priest ==
He enrolled at Bishop Barham College for a Certificate in Theology. He was then posted to Nyakagyeme Parish in 1999, to Kyatoko and Rumbugu parishes in Rukungiri before returning back to school in 2008. After his graduation, he was made the North Diocesan Treasurer and later a Canon of the church of Uganda upto when he was elected bishop of the same Diocese in 23 August 2016. Magezi was elected by the convention of the House of Bishops of Church of Uganda at Uganda Christian University Mukono and he was consecrated on 8 January 2017 at St. Emmanuel Cathedral Kinyasano in Rukungiri district.

== Bishop ==
He was the 5th Bishop of North Kigezi since 2017 until his death. He became a bishop after serving in a low rank as a church lay leader. He replaced Bishop Patrick Tugume Tusingwire who had ritred at the age of 65.

Bishop Magezi initiated a church project in 2019 with a fundraising more than 400m and shs.2b are said to have already been spent on the project. Apart from the Church project, Bishop Magezi started many schools like Uganda Bible Institute, Ankole Diocese which he headed from 2003 to 2010 and he also initiated a refurnish of health centres founded by the Diocese.

== Death ==
Magezi died on 15 June 2021 at the Mulago National Specialised Hospital at the age of 60, from the consequences of an infection with COVID-19. He was buried on 17 June 2021. He is survived by his wife, Maama Gladys Magezi, and their five children.

== See also ==
- Bishops of Uganda
- Anglican Diocese of Uganda
- Uganda Christian University
