= Karooro =

Karooro is name. Notable people with the name include:

- Emmanuel Karooro (born 1945), Ugandan educator
- Mary Karooro Okurut (born 1954), Ugandan educator
