= Alfred Muhoozi =

Ugandan Anglican bishop (born 1972)

The Right Reverend Alfred Muhoozi
- Bishop of North Ankole
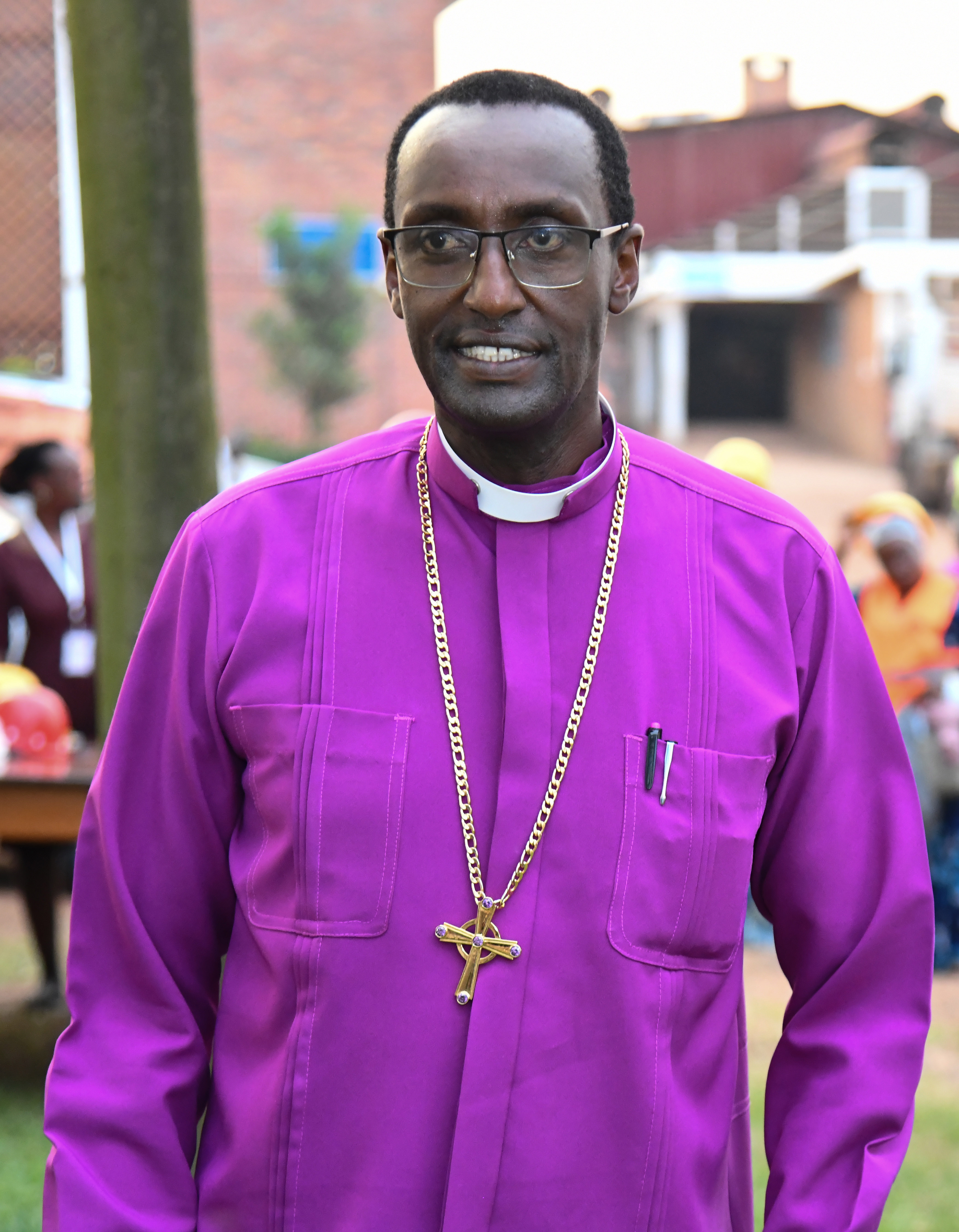
- Alfred Muhoozi
- Church: Church of Uganda
- Diocese: North Ankole
- Predecessor: Stephen Namanya

Orders
- Consecration: 26 May 2024 by Stephen Kaziimba

Personal details
- Born: 9 October 1972 (age 53)
- Denomination: Anglican
- Education: Uganda Christian University

Alfred Muhoozi (born 9 October 1972) is a Ugandan Anglican bishop.

== Early life and career ==
Muhoozi was born to James Parker Byempaka and Constance Tushemererwe in Kazo sub-county. He was the court clerk for Kazo sub-county.

He studied from Uganda Christian University (UCU) where he attained a diploma, bachelor’s and master’s of theology.

On 16 December 2007, he was ordained as the Deacon. Then he later became the Archdeacon of Kinoni Archdeaconry, North Ankole Diocese.

On 26 May 2024, Muhoozi was consecrated and enthroned as the third bishop of North Ankole at St. Emmanuel Cathedral, Rushere. The function was presided over by the Archbishop of the Church of Uganda, Stephen Kaziimba.He succeeded the Rt. Rev. Stephen Namanya.

== Personal life ==
Muhoozi is married to Molly Muhoozi and together they have four children.
