= John Kahigwa =

Anglican bishop in Uganda (1938–2012)

John Wilson Kahigwa (November 12, 1938 - March 14, 2012) was an Anglican bishop in Uganda: he was Bishop of Kigezi from 1996 to 2004.

Kahigwa was educated at Uganda Christian University and ordained deacon in 1965 and priest in 1967.

Kahigwa died of prostate cancer on 15th March 2012.
