= John Muhanguzi =

Ugandan Bishop

John Muhanguzi is an Anglican bishop in Uganda: he was the first Bishop of North Ankole from 2003 until his retirement in 2015.
