= Amos Magezi =

Ugandan bishop

Amos Magezi is an Anglican bishop in Uganda: he has been the Bishop of Northwest Ankole since 2017.

Magezi was born in 1963 in Kyeizooba, Bushenyi District. He was educated at Rwatsinga School, the Reformed Theological Seminary and Uganda Christian University. He was appointed the Diocesan Mission Coordinator of Ankole Diocese in 2001; Chaplain of Mbarara High School and Dean of St. James Cathedral Ruharo in 2010. Magezi was consecrated on 1 October 2017 at St. Paul's Cathedral, Ibanda.
