= Dick Lyth =

Richard Edward Lyth (1916–2005) was an Anglican bishop in Uganda: he served as the inaugural Bishop of Kigezi.

Lyth was born in York and educated at Uppingham School and St Edmund Hall, Oxford. He was a CMS missionary in Sudan from 1938 and a military chaplain from 1943. In 1940, he volunteered to fight in the East Africa Campaign, and was tasked with raising native troops to combat invading Italian forces. He would lead them in guerrilla warfare against the Italians, eventually pushing them back beyond the Ethiopian border. After the war, he was ordained deacon in 1956 and priest in 1957. After a curacy in Arthuret he went out to Uganda where he was Headteacher of Kigezi High School until his elevation to the episcopate. He served as bishop from 1967 to 1972.
