= Nsubuga =

Nsubuga is a surname. Notable people with the surname include:

- Dunstan Nsubuga, Anglican bishop in Uganda
- Emmanuel Nsubuga (1914–1991), Ugandan Roman Catholic archbishop
- Emmanuel Nsubuga (boxer) (born 1967), Ugandan boxer
- Eridard Nsubuga, Anglican bishop in Uganda
- Florence Nsubuga (born 1973), Ugandan businesswoman
- Frank Nsubuga (born 1980), Ugandan cricketer
- Kipoi Tonny Nsubuga (born 1978), Ugandan politician
