= Negafa =

Traditional dresser for Moroccan weddings

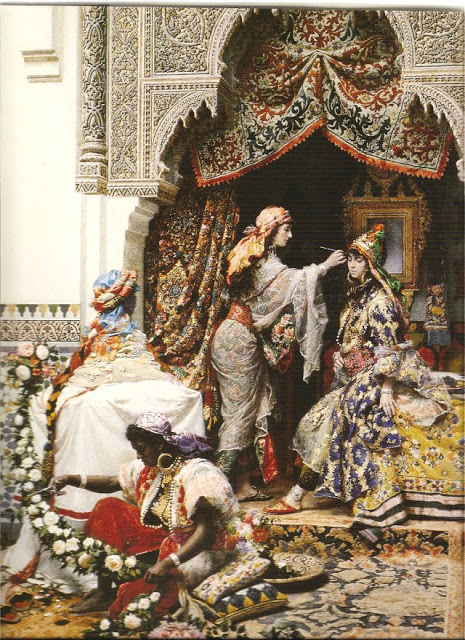
Women at work, preparing a Moroccan bride in a caftan for her wedding; the ma'llma, a white woman who dictates under her authority, is visible, along with two black women, freed slaves. Painting by Josep Tapiró (between 1880 and 1913), Tangier, Morocco.

Negafa (also spelled Neggafa) or ziana (Tamazight: nggafa ⵏⴳⴰⴼⴰ; Arabic: نڭافة) is the traditional dresser of the bride and guardian of the traditions of Moroccan wedding ceremonies. The negafa is an ancient profession reserved for women. This centuries-old trade consisted of preparing the bride, furnishing the nuptial chamber, and, above all, ensuring that all rites were scrupulously respected. The profession continues to thrive in contemporary Morocco and within the Moroccan diaspora weddings.

== Etymology ==
The term negafa's origin is unclear, while many believe it comes from Tamazight, others think it could be borrowed from Arabic.

In the north of Morocco, in the cities of Tangier, Tetouan or Asilah, some people refer to the negafa by the term ziyyāna (زيّانة 'beautifier'), derived from the word zīn (زين 'beauty').

== History ==
The negafa, plural negafate, or ngafat, were recruited from among freed slaves, called "Haratins." They represent a sub-Saharan ethnic group, imported into Morocco and more generally into the Maghreb as slaves in the Middle Ages. The negafa, as a true matchmaker, according to some authors, probably had a defined status starting from the 18th or 19th century.

At the beginning of the 20th century, the ngafat formed a professional group headed by an amīna (أمينة 'trustworthy woman'). The amina was chosen by a maʿllma (معلمة 'mistress of ceremonies' in this context) and the choice was then officially confirmed by the muḥtasib (محتسِب 'inspector' or 'accountant'). The maʿllma was always an elderly, wealthy, and highly respected woman. She arbitrated disputes among members of the profession as well as between members and clients, herself distributed the title of maʿllma, and submitted the appointments to the muḥtasib. She led a team that included three to five other women, known as sana'a, and a variable number of apprentices. The most numerous groups could comprise up to forty people. The women were not allowed to marry, otherwise they would have to leave the profession.

=== The wedding day ===
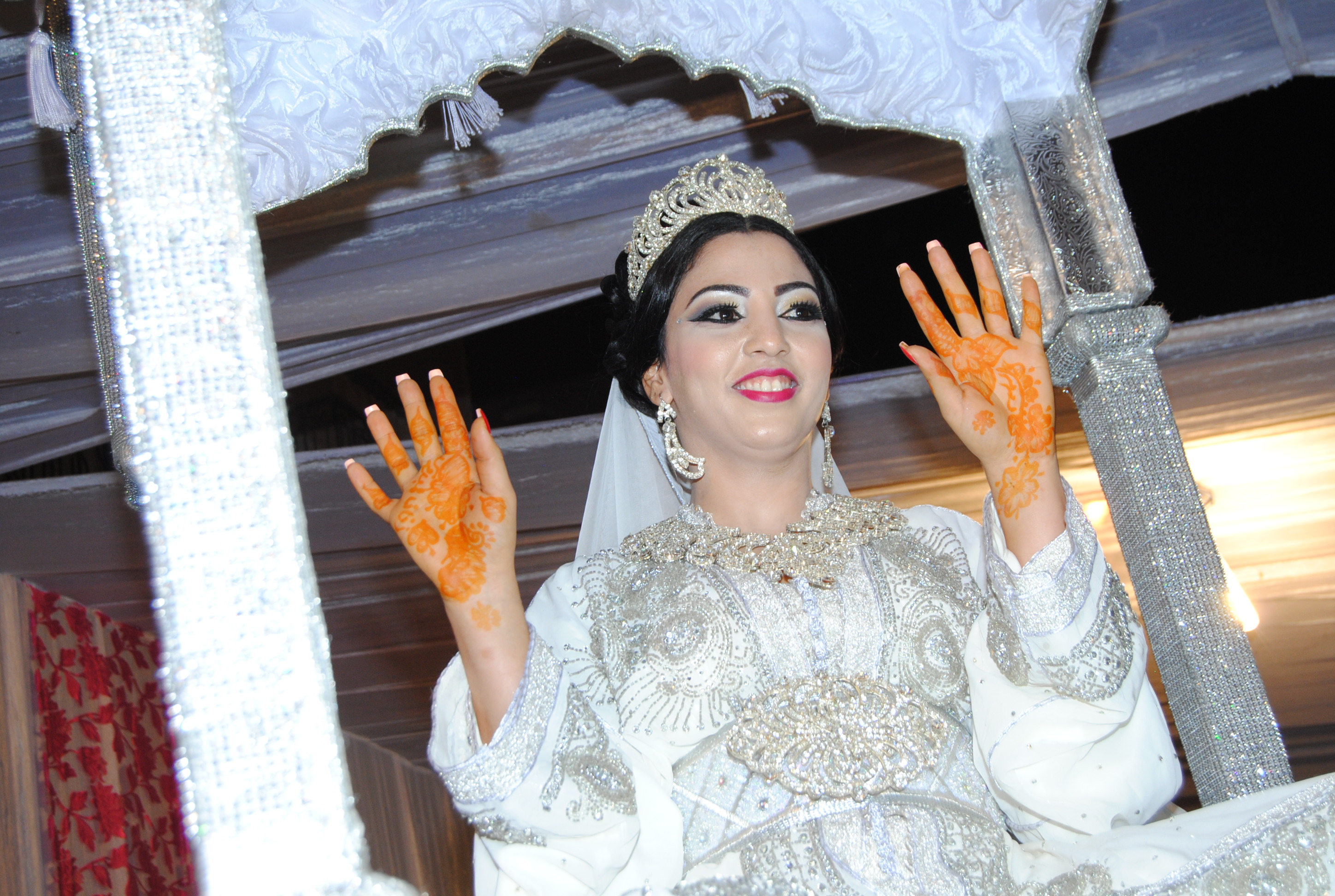
A Moroccan bride carried on an ammaria

On the wedding day, the Negafa and her team (often two to five assistants) manage the bride's appearance closely. The bride typically changes outfits multiple times, (three or more traditional outfits), throughout the celebration. The Negafa ensures that each outfit, makeup, jewelry and accessories, all are looking perfect. The Negafa also directs the bride's posture and movements, manages the timing of outfit changes, and coordinates with photographers and other vendors to ensure the bride looks perfect for the photos. She also manages the doura or the ammaria, the traditional procession where the bride and groom are carried on a platform. Usually the Negafa also supports the bride emotionally, helping her manage stress and remain calm throughout the long and intense day.

== See also ==
- Moroccan culture
- Moroccan Kaftan
- Marriage customs in Africa
- Islamic marital practices
