= Yostus Ruhindi =

Anglican bishop

Yostus Ruhindi (or Yostasi; 1925–2006) was an Anglican bishop in Uganda.

Ruhindi was born in Rukungiri District and educated at Uganda Christian University. He was ordained deacon in 1957 and priest in 1960. He served in the Diocese of Uganda from 1957 to 1960 and in Namirembe from 1960 to 1972. Ruhindi was consecrated a bishop on 6 August 1972 to serve as Bishop of Bunyoro-Kitara; and after Translation to North Kigezi on 12 April 1981 and served until 1996.
