= Ernest Shalita =

Ugandan Bishop

Ernest Shalita (1936-2012) was an Anglican bishop in Uganda: he served as the inaugural Bishop of Muhabura from 1990 to 2002.

Shalita was born in Rwaramba, Kisoro District. He was educated at Rwaramba Church School, Seseme Primary School, Mbarara High School and Bishop Stuart University. He was ordained in 1965. He served in Kigezi diocese and was the first Vicar general of All Saints Cathedral Nakasero.
