= Kosiya Shalita =

Ugandan Anglican bishop

Kosiya Shalita was an Anglican bishop in Uganda.

Shalita was ordained deacon in 1933 and priest in 1934. He was consecrated Assistant Bishop of Uganda on 5 May 1957. He was translated to Ankole-Kigezi in 1961; and to Ankole in 1967. He resigned in 1970.
