= Edward Muhima =

Edward Muhima (born 14 June 1946) is an Anglican bishop in Uganda: he was Bishop of North Kigezi from 2004 to 2011.

Muhima was born in Bunyaruguru, Rubirizi District. He was educated at Nyakinoni Primary School, Nyakasura Secondary School and Uganda Christian University. He was a teacher before his call to ministry.

Muhima retired in 2011 after serving the church for over 25 years.
