= Stephen Namanya =

Stephen Namanya is an Anglican bishop in Uganda: he was the second Bishop of North Ankole from 2015 to 2024. after the Right Rev. John Muhanguzi (the 1st Bishop). Namanya was succeeded by Rt.Rev. Alfred Muhoozi on 26th May 2024 Namanya was born on June 2, 1959, at Kabuyanda, Isingiro District and educated at Uganda Christian University. He was ordained a deacon in 1987, and a priest in 1988. He has served as a parish priest; an archdeacon; and as Chairperson of the House of Clergy for North Ankole Diocese. Namanya was consecrated on 2 August 2015 at Emmanuel Cathedral, Rushere.
