= Sheldon Mwesigwa =

Ugandan Anglican bishop

The Right Reverend Fred Sheldon Mwesigwa
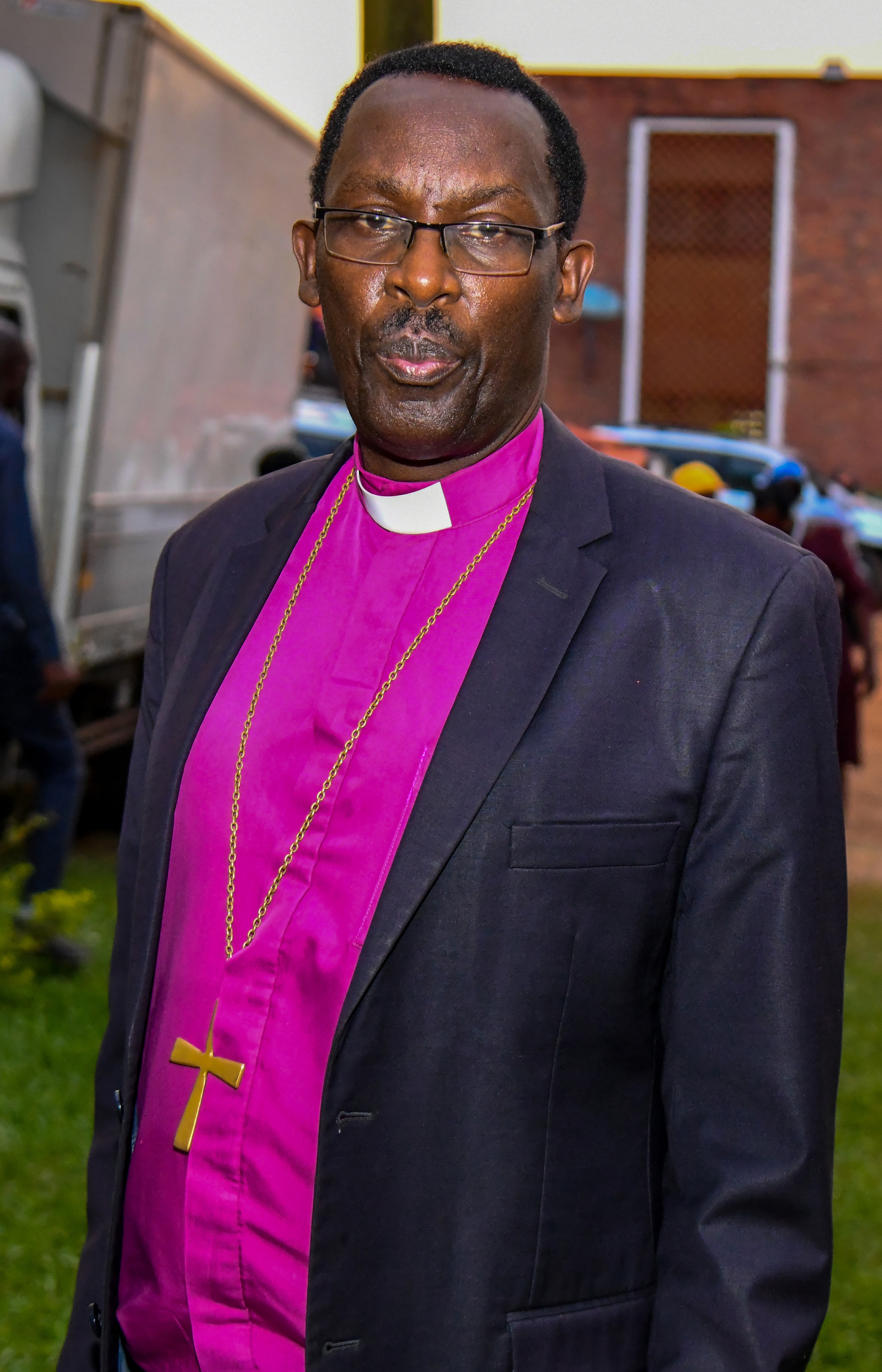
- Mwesigwa in 2023
- Church: Church of Uganda
- Diocese: Ankole
- In office: 18 July 2010
- Predecessor: George Tibeesigwa

Orders
- Ordination: 1990 (priest)

Personal details
- Born: 29 September 1962 (age 64) Ruhoko village, Ibanda, Uganda
- Spouse: Alice Mwesigwa (m. 1994)
- Children: 4
- Education: Bishop Tucker Theological College (BA); University of Leeds (MA, PhD)

Fred Sheldon Mwesigwa (born 29 September 1962) is an Anglican bishop in Uganda. Since 18 July 2010, he has served as the fifth Bishop of Ankole. He also serves as the current chancellor of Bishop Stuart University based in Mbarara city.

== Biography ==
Mwesigwa was born in Ruhoko village in Ibanda. He was the youngest of Steven Rushota and Julia Kageye's four children. Mwesigwa received a primary level education at Kijjabwemi Church of Uganda Primary school and passed the Primary Level Examination in 1976. Because his A-level scores were one point too low for university entrance, he opted to enroll at Kakoba Teachers Training College in 1983. In 1986, Mwesigwa was assigned to teach at Kibubura Girls’ Secondary School in Ibanda. During that time, he became interested in Christianity but had not committed himself to the religion, being told by a priest that he "was young man who wanted to destroy the church." That summer, (Note: Sources disagree over the exact month; New Vision reports his conversion to Christianity as 6 June, while The Monitor reports it as 6 July.) Mwesigwa and his mother converted to Christianity after hearing a sermon at church.

The following year, he decided to pursue Christian ministry and enrolled at Bishop Tucker Theological College, know known as Uganda Christian University. In 1990, he received a bachelor's degree in divinity and was ordained as a priest. He then became a chaplain and the deputy headmaster of Kibubura Girls’ School. There, he met his wife, who was the Scripture union leader at the time and married her in 1994. After their wedding, Mwesigwa became a chaplain and the deputy headmaster at Ntare School. In 1997, he began working on his master's degree in education at the University of Leeds in the United Kingdom in addition to his teaching work. He then received a doctorate of philosophy in religious education from the same institution in 2003. While he completed his doctorate, he wrote a book on education called Contrasting Ironies About Teaching. After leaving Ntare school in 2005 to focus on pastoral work, he became a senior lecturer at Uganda Christian University and the dean of the Faculty of Education.

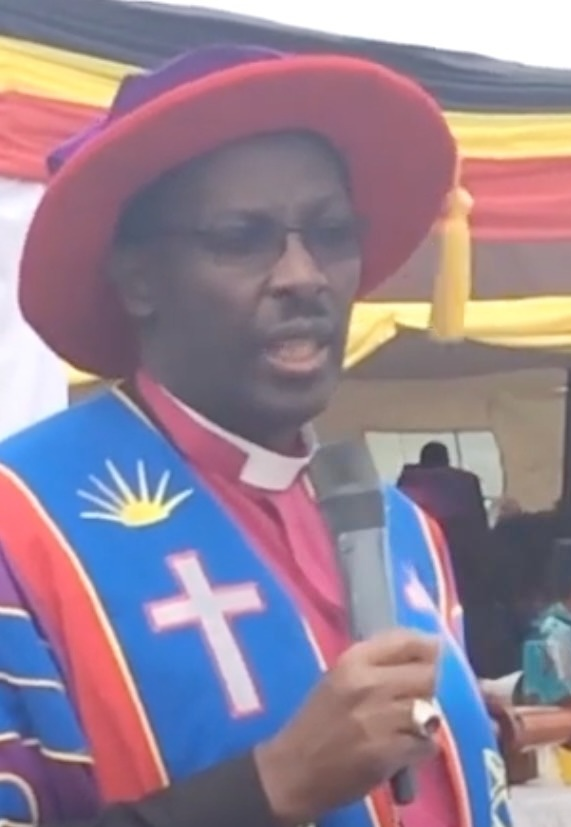
On 18 July 2010, Mwesigwa was enthroned bishop of Ankole at Ruharo Cathedral in Mbarara, making him the fifth bishop of that diocese. Henry Luke Orombi, the Archbishop of Uganda at the time, presided over the consecration ceremony and Ugandan president Yoweri Museveni attended the ceremony. He succeeded the Rt. Rev Dr. George Tibesigwa.

== Personal life ==
Fred Sheldon Mwesigwa is married to Alice Mwesigwa and they have four children. He met his wife while serving at Kibubura Girls' Secondary School in Ibanda, where he worked as chaplain and deputy head teacher, while Alice served as a teacher and head of scripture Union. The two later married in 1994.

== Publications ==
- Contrasting Ironies about Teaching

== See also ==
- Church of Uganda
- Ankole Diocese
- Bishop Stuart University
- Henry Luke Orombi
