= Ruharo Mission Hospital =

Private non-profit hospital in Uganda

- Church of Uganda

Geography
- Location: Ruharo, Mbarara, Mbarara District, Uganda
- Coordinates: 00°36′46″S 30°37′52″E

Organisation
- Care system: Community hospital
- Type: General and specialist
- Affiliated university: Church of Uganda

Services
- Emergency department: I
- Beds: 100

History
- Founded: 1981; 45 years ago

Links
- Website: Homepage
- Lists: Hospitals in Uganda
- Other links: Hospitals in Uganda

Ruharo Mission Hospital is a community hospital in Uganda. It is affiliated with the Anglican Church of Uganda.

== Location ==
The hospital is located in the neighborhood called Ruharo, in Kamukuzi Division of the city of Mbarara, in Mbarara District, in the Ankole sub-region of the Western Region of Uganda. Ruharo Mission Hospital is approximately 4 kilometres (2.5 mi) west the Mbarara Regional Referral Hospital in the central business district of the city, along the Mbarara–Ishaka Road. The geographical coordinates of the hospital are: 0°36'46.0"S, 30°37'52.0"E (Latitude:-0.612778; Longitude:30.631111).

== Overview ==
The institution is a private, non-profit, community hospital with a bed capacity of 100. The hospital is a fee-paying hospital, although no one is turned away due to inability to pay. The fees collected from the patients partially cover the total hospital expenses.

Ruharo Mission Hospital was founded in 1981 by the late Bishop Amos Betungura, at that time the Bishop of East Ankole Diocese of the Church of Uganda. Later the hospital was taken over by the Ankole Diocese of the Church of Uganda. The following subsidiaries are owned by Ruharo Mission Hospital, either in full or in part. (a) General Medical Services (b) Ruharo Mission Eye Centre (c) Organized Useful Rehabilitation Services (d) St. Johns Health Centre, in Katojo – Biharwe (e) Ibanda Mission Health Centre in Ibanda and (f) St. Luke Clinic in Kisyoro, Isingiro District.

== Accreditation ==
The hospital is accredited by the Uganda Ministry of Health and by the Uganda Protestant Medical Bureau. It is owned by the Ankole Diocese of the Church of Uganda and is administered by the Hospital Management Committee.

== See also ==
- Hospitals in Uganda
- Kisiizi
