= Alphonse Watho-kudi =

Ugandan Anglican bishop

Alphonse Watho-kudi was an Anglican bishop in Uganda: he was the Bishop of Nebbi from 2004 until his death in 2021.

He died on 10 January 2021 aged 62, and his funeral was on 12 January 2021 at St Stephen's Cathedral, Goli.
