= Yonah Katoneene =

Anglican bishop in Uganda

Yonah Mwesigwa Katoneene (commonly known as Bishop Yona Katoneene) was an Anglican bishop in Uganda; he was Bishop of West Ankole from 2006 to 2016.
