= Dunstan Nsubuga =

Bishop in Uganda

Dunstan Kasi Nsubuga
- Bishop of Namirembe
- Church: Anglican Church of Uganda
- Diocese: Namirembe
- Term ended: 1985
- Successor: Misaeri Kitemaggwa Kauma

Orders
- Consecration: 1965

Personal details
- Born: Uganda
- Denomination: Anglican
- Education: Uganda Christian University

Dunstan Kasi Nsubuga was an Anglican Bishop who served as Dean of Namirembe and later as the first indigenous Bishop of Namirembe Diocese. He played a key role in the transition of church leadership from missionary to indigenous clergy in the mid-20th century.

== Early life and education ==
Nsubuga was educated at Uganda Christian University in Mukono, Uganda.

== Ordination and early ministry ==
He was ordained a deacon in 1944 and a priest in 1945. Nsubuga served in the Diocese of Uganda (the precursor to Namirembe Diocese and others) from 1944 to 1961, taking on parish and diocesan responsibilities.

== Dean of Namirembe and episcopal ministry ==
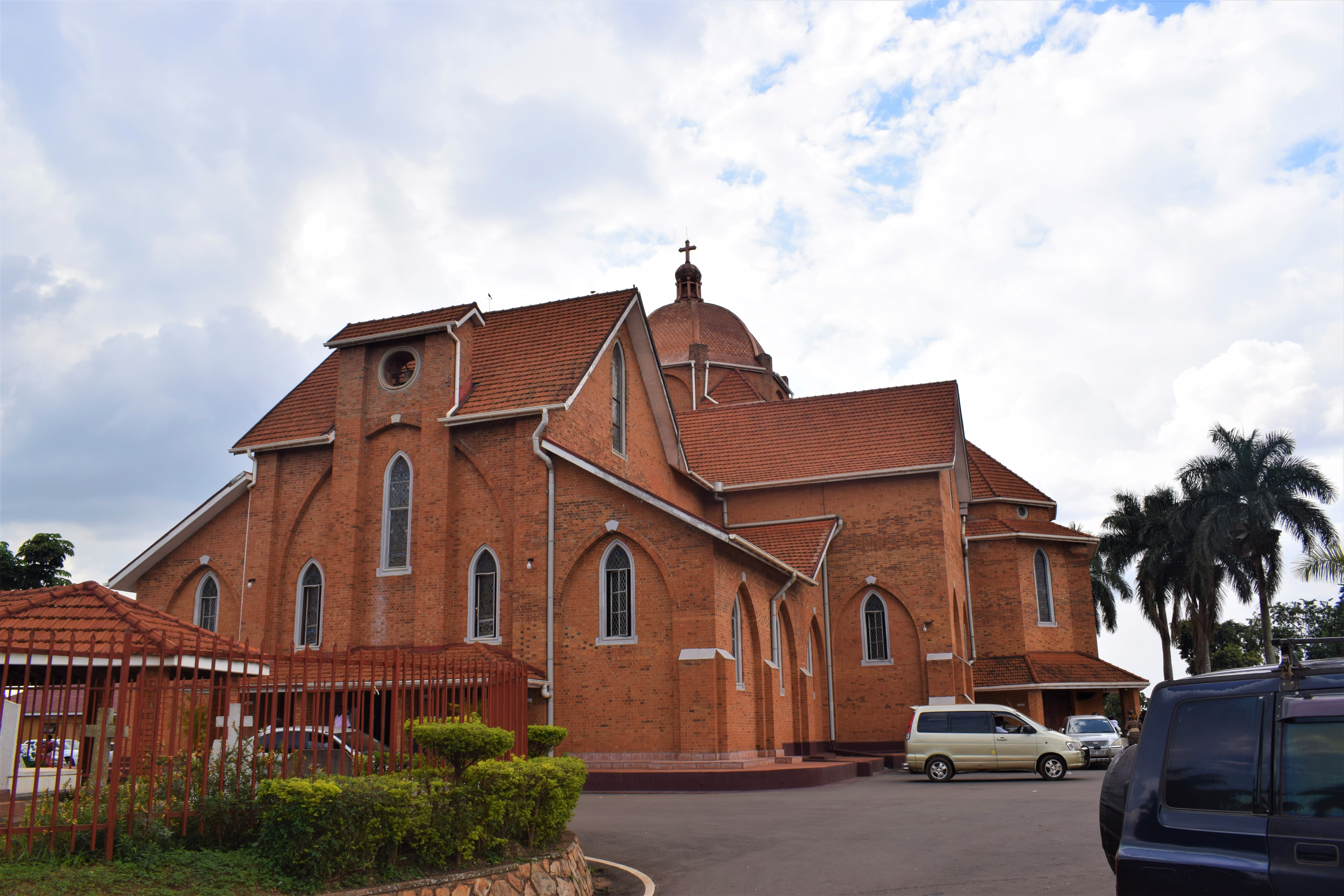
St Paul's Cathedral, Namirembe

In 1961, Nsubuga was appointed Dean of Namirembe, serving at St Paul's Cathedral, Namirembe. He was consecrated as an Assistant Bishop in 1965 by Archbishop Leslie Brown, during a significant transition to indigenous leadership in Uganda. He later became Bishop of Namirembe, serving until 1985. During his episcopate, he launched the construction of the Namirembe Cathedral Synod Hall as part of the centenary celebrations of Christianity in Uganda.

His name is commemorated among notable leaders at Namirembe Cathedral, reflecting his longstanding contribution to the cathedral and diocese.

== Honours ==
In 1958, Nsubuga was awarded an honorary Doctor of Divinity (D.D.) by St Paul's University, Tokyo.

== Legacy ==
Nsubuga is remembered for helping indigenize church leadership in Uganda and for mentoring a generation of clergy, including figures like Misaeri Kauma. His episcopacy contributed to both spiritual leadership and physical development of Namirembe Diocese. To keep his legacy, Ugandans have done a number of things to eulogise Nsubuga including composing songs in his honor, and a school, Bishop Dunstan Nsubuga Memorial Secondary School was founded in his honor.

== See also ==
- Church of Uganda
- Misaeri Kitemaggwa Kauma
- Namirembe Cathedral
- Uganda Christian University
