= Patrick Tugume Tusingwire =

Patrick Tugume Tusingwire (born 1952) was an Anglican bishop in Uganda: he was Bishop of Kigezi from 2011 to 2011.
