= Moses Banja =

Ugandan Anglican bishop (born 1964)

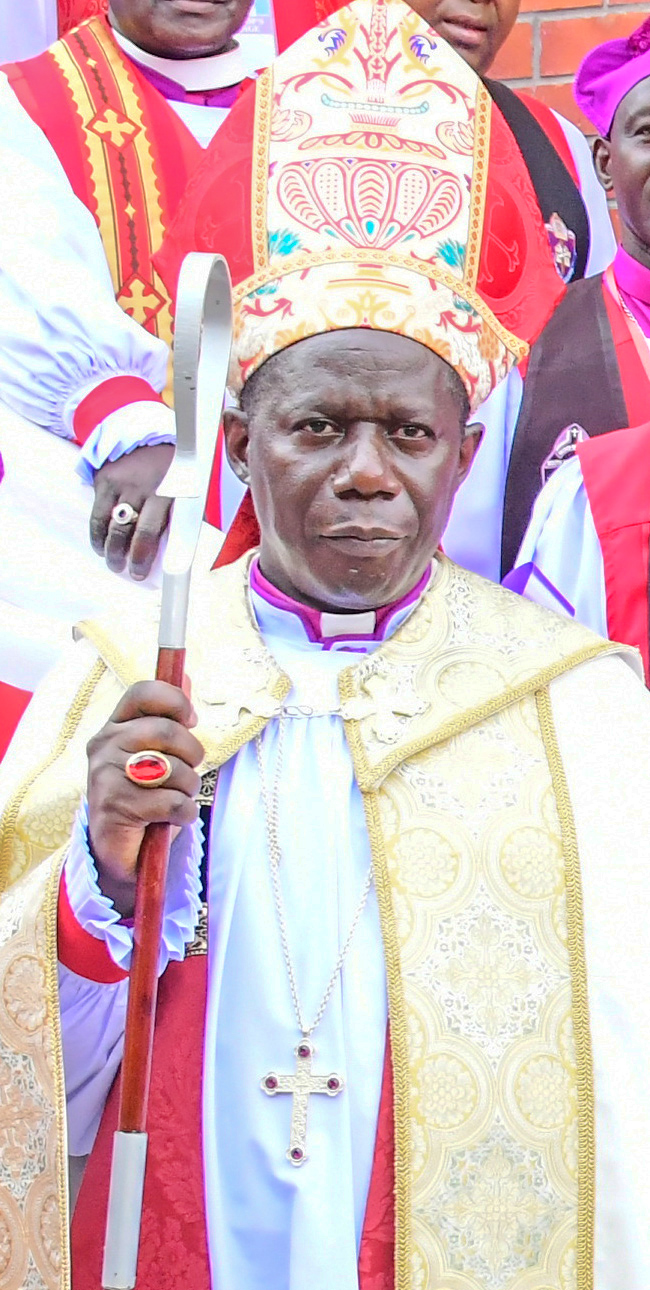
Bp. Moses Banja

Moses Banja (born October 20, 1964) is a Ugandan Anglican bishop. Since 2023, he has been the 6th Bishop of Namirembe. He was elected on November 20, 2023. He succeeded Bishop Wilberforce Kityo Luwalira, who served since 2009.

== Appointments ==
- St Philip's and Andrew's Cathedral Mukono - Assistant Vicar (2004)
- Mukono Diocese: Diocesan Secretary
- Namirembe Diocese: Diocesan Education Secretary (2012)
- Namirembe Diocese: Assistant Human Resource Officer (2018)
- Namirembe Diocese: Archdeacon of Luzira Archdeaconry (2021)

== Bishop of Namirembe ==
Banja was elected Bishop of Namirembe Diocese by the House of Bishops during its sitting at St Stephen’s Cathedral, Naluwerere in East Busoga Diocese on November 20th, 2023. He was consecrated and enthroned on December 10, 2023, at St Paul's Cathedral, Namirembe to replace Bishop Wilberforce Kityo Luwalira who had been at the helm of the diocese for the last 14 years.

== Personal life ==
Banja has been married to the Rev. Canon Olivia Nassaka since 2001 and together they have three children.
