= Misaeri Kauma =

Anglican bishop in Uganda (1929–1997)

Misaeri Kitemaggwa Kauma
- Bishop of Namirembe
- Church: Anglican Church of Uganda
- Diocese: Namirembe
- Appointed: 1985
- Term ended: 1994
- Predecessor: Dunstan Kasi Nsubuga
- Successor: Samuel Balagadde Ssekkadde

Orders
- Consecration: 29 June 1975

Personal details
- Born: 15 August 1929 Namagoma, Uganda
- Died: 7 October 1997 (aged 68) Mengo Hospital, Kampala, Uganda
- Denomination: Anglican
- Spouse: Geraldine Kauma
- Children: 6
- Education: Bishop Tucker Theological College; Durham University

Misaeri Kitemaggwa Kauma (15 August 1929 – 7 October 1997) was an Anglican Bishop in Uganda who served as Assistant Bishop and later Bishop of Namirembe. He was known for his leadership in theological education and for early public advocacy on HIV/AIDS in Uganda.

== Early life and education ==
Kauma was born on 15 August 1929 at Namagoma, in Uganda. He received his theological education at Bishop Tucker Theological College (now part of Uganda Christian University) and undertook further studies at Durham University in the United Kingdom. He was ordained to the Anglican Ministry in 1967.

== Early ministry and teaching ==
Before entering full-time episcopal ministry, Kauma worked as a teacher and served as a principal at several secondary schools and theological institutions in Uganda. In the early 1970s, he served among refugees and was later appointed Principal of Bishop Tucker Theological College in Mukono.

== Episcopal ministry ==
Kauma was consecrated as Assistant Bishop of Namirembe on 29 June 1975 and served as assistant to Bishop Dunstan Kasi Nsubuga. After a decade as Assistant Bishop, he was enthroned as Bishop of Namirembe on 17 February 1985 and served as diocesan Bishop until his retirement in 1994. During his episcopate, he emphasised evangelism, theological education, and reconciliation in a period when Uganda was recovering from political unrest.

== Public work and HIV/AIDS advocacy ==
Kauma was among the first senior Ugandan Christian leaders to speak publicly about the HIV/AIDS epidemic. He served as chairman of the Uganda AIDS Commission and used his position to call for awareness, pastoral care and community responses to the epidemic; he also composed a prayer for those affected by HIV/AIDS.

== Retirement and death ==
Kauma retired from active diocesan ministry in 1994. He died on 7 October 1997, reportedly of heart failure at Mengo Hospital in Kampala. His funeral and burial at the grounds of St Paul's Cathedral, Namirembe, drew thousands of mourners.

== Legacy ==
Kauma is remembered in the Diocese of Namirembe for his service in theological education and for pastoral leadership during a difficult period in Uganda's history. Several commemorations and memorial pages recount his life and ministry, and family and diocesan sources note continued interest in publishing a fuller biography.

== Personal life ==
Kauma was married to Geraldine Kauma, with whom he raised a family. Together, they had six children who pursued a range of careers, including teaching, auditing, law, botany and welfare work.

== See also ==
- Diocese of Namirembe
- Anglican Church of Uganda
