= Alice Muhoozi =

Ugandan presidential speechwriter and public official

Presidential speechwriter at State House Uganda

Personal details
- Occupation: Speechwriter, public official

Alice Muhoozi is a Ugandan public official who has served as a presidential speechwriter at State House Uganda.

She is President Yoweri Museveni’s speechwriter and also serves on the board of the Uganda Printing and Publishing Corporation (UPPC).

== Education and career ==
Muhoozi possesses a master's degree in International Relations and Diplomatic Studies, and a bachelor's degree in English Language Studies and Linguistics.

She edited the second edition of Yoweri Museveni's Sowing the Mustard Seed: The Struggle for Freedom and Democracy in Uganda. She also co-authored the Katondoozi y'oRunyankore-Rukiga, a thesaurus of Runyankore-Rukiga, with Yoweri Museveni, Muranga Manuel and Gilbert Gumoshabe.

In 2023, Muhoozi was named as a board member of the Uganda Printing and Publishing Corporation, the state-owned publisher of the Uganda Gazette and other government publications.

== Controversy ==
Muhoozi came to wider public attention through her role at the State House, where she serves as President Museveni's speechwriter in reporting on an Independence Day speech controversy. The anniversary was celebrated in Kyotera district, where President Yoweri Museveni was the chief guest. She is said to have recycled the 2017 independence day speech on the 56th Independence anniversary. The replicated words, 167 in total, followed immediately after the preamble in the same order.
