= Johnson Gakumba =

Johnson Gakumba (born February 25, 1959) is an Anglican bishop in Uganda: he has been Bishop of Northern Uganda since 2009.

Gakumba was born at Kiswata, Masindi District. He was educated at Uganda Christian University and ordained in 1983. He has served in Bobi, Kitgum and Luzira.
