= Anglican dioceses of Ankole and Kigezi =

Dioceses of the Church of Uganda

The Anglican dioceses of Ankole and Kigezi are the Anglican presence in (roughly) the ancient Ankole kingdom and the old Kigezi District; they are part of the Church of Uganda. The remaining dioceses of the church are in the areas of Buganda, of Eastern Uganda, of Northern Uganda, and of Rwenzori.

== Diocese of Ankole ==
The Diocese of Ankole-Kigezi was one of five split from the Diocese of Uganda on 1 July 1960; when the Kigezi diocese was created in 1967, this diocese became Ankole (and Shalita remained in post). When this diocese was again split 10 years later, the remaining part (where Betungura continued as bishop) became known as East Ankole diocese, until 2003, when it resumed the name Diocese of Ankole (upon the erection of North Ankole diocese; Kyamugambi remained in his renamed See). The current mother church is St James's Cathedral, Ruharo (near Mbarara).

=== Bishops of Ankole ===
- 1960–1970 (ret.): Kosiya Shalita (Bishop of Ankole-Kigezi until 1967)
- 6 December 1970 – 1992 (ret.): Amos Betungura (Bishop of East Ankole from 1977)
- 30 August 1992 – 2007 (ret.): Elisha Kyamugambi (Bishop of East Ankole until 2003)
- 2007: William Magambo, caretaker bishop
- 2 September 2007 – 2010 (ret.): George Tibeesigwa
- 18 July 2010 – present: Sheldon Mwesigwa

== Diocese of Kigezi ==
Erected from Ankole—Kigezi in 1967. Around August 1981, Kigezi diocese was split to create North Kigezi diocese; Kivengere remained in post in the southern part.

=== Bishops of Kigezi ===
- 1967–1972: Dick Lyth
- 1972 – 18 May 1988 (d.): Festo Kivengere (in exile 1977–1979)
- 2 July 1989 – 1998 (ret.): William Rukirande
- 1998–2014: George Katwesigye
- 2014–2022: George Bagamuhunda
- 2022-present: Gaddie Akanjuna

== Diocese of West Ankole ==
Founded from the Diocese of Ankole (which became East Ankole) in 1977; See at St Peter's Cathedral, Bweranyangi, Bushenyi District.

=== Bishops of West Ankole ===
- 30 January 1977 – 1997: Yoramu Bamunoba
- 1997–2005: William Magambo
- 2006 – October 2016 (ret.): Yonah Katoneene
- 28 May 2017 – present: Johnson Twinomujuni

== Diocese of North Kigezi ==
Split in 1981 from the Diocese of Kigezi; cathedral: Emmanuel Cathedral, Kinyasano, Rukungiri District.

=== Bishops of North Kigezi ===
- 12 April 1981 – 1996: Yostus Ruhindi (also Yustasi; previously Bishop of Bunyoro-Kitara)
- 1996–2004: John Kahigwa
- 11 January 2004 – 2011 (ret.): Edward Muhima
- 5 June 2011 – 2017 (ret.): Patrick Tugume Tusingwire
- 8 January 2017 – 15 June 2021: Benon Magezi
- 18 June 2021 – 12 March 2023 Emeritus Patrick Tugume Tusingwire, as Caretaker Bishop
- 12 March 2023 – present: Onesimus Asiimwe

== Diocese of Muhabura ==
Erected in 1990 from Kigezi diocese.

=== Bishops of Muhabura ===
- 1990–2002: Ernest Shalita

David Sebuhinja was bishop-elect 2001–2006; he did not become Bishop of Muhabura but bishop-assistant for the Provincial Secretariat

- 26 August 2007 – present: Cranmer Mugisha

== Diocese of Kinkiizi ==
Divided from the Diocese of North Kigezi, 1995; the mother church is St Peter's Cathedral, Nyakatare.

=== Bishops of Kinkiizi ===
- 7 May 1995 – 2010 (ret.): John Ntegyereize (previously Archdeacon of Kinkiizi)
- 10 October 2010 – present: Dan Zoreka

== Diocese of North Ankole ==
Erected from East Ankole diocese (which reverted to Ankole), 2003.

=== Bishops of North Ankole ===
- 2003–2015: John Muhanguzi
- 2015–2024: Stephen Namanya (previously Archdeacon of Kashwa)
- Since 2024: Alfred Muhoozi

== Diocese of South Ankole ==
Created in 2012 from Ankole and from West Ankole.

=== Bishops of South Ankole ===
- 8 January 2012 – present: Nathan Ahimbisibwe

== Diocese of Northwest Ankole ==
Founded from the Diocese of Ankole, 2017; cathedral at St Paul's, Ibanda.

=== Bishops of Northwest Ankole ===
- 1 October 2017 – present: Amos Magezi

== See also ==
- Anglican dioceses of Buganda
- Anglican dioceses of Eastern Uganda
- Anglican dioceses of Northern Uganda
- Anglican dioceses of Rwenzori
- List of Roman Catholic dioceses in Uganda
