= Johnson Twinomujuni =

Anglican bishop in Uganda

The Right Reverend Johnson Twinomujuni
- Bishop of West Ankole
- Church: Church of Uganda
- Installed: 28 May 2017
- Predecessor: Yonah Katoneene

Orders
- Ordination: December 1999
- Consecration: 28 May 2017

Personal details
- Born: 11 August 1968 (age 58) Muko, Mbarara District, Uganda
- Denomination: Anglican
- Spouse: Joy Twinomujuni
- Occupation: Bishop, theologian
- Education: African Bible College (Malawi); Reformed Theological Seminary (USA); Uganda Christian University

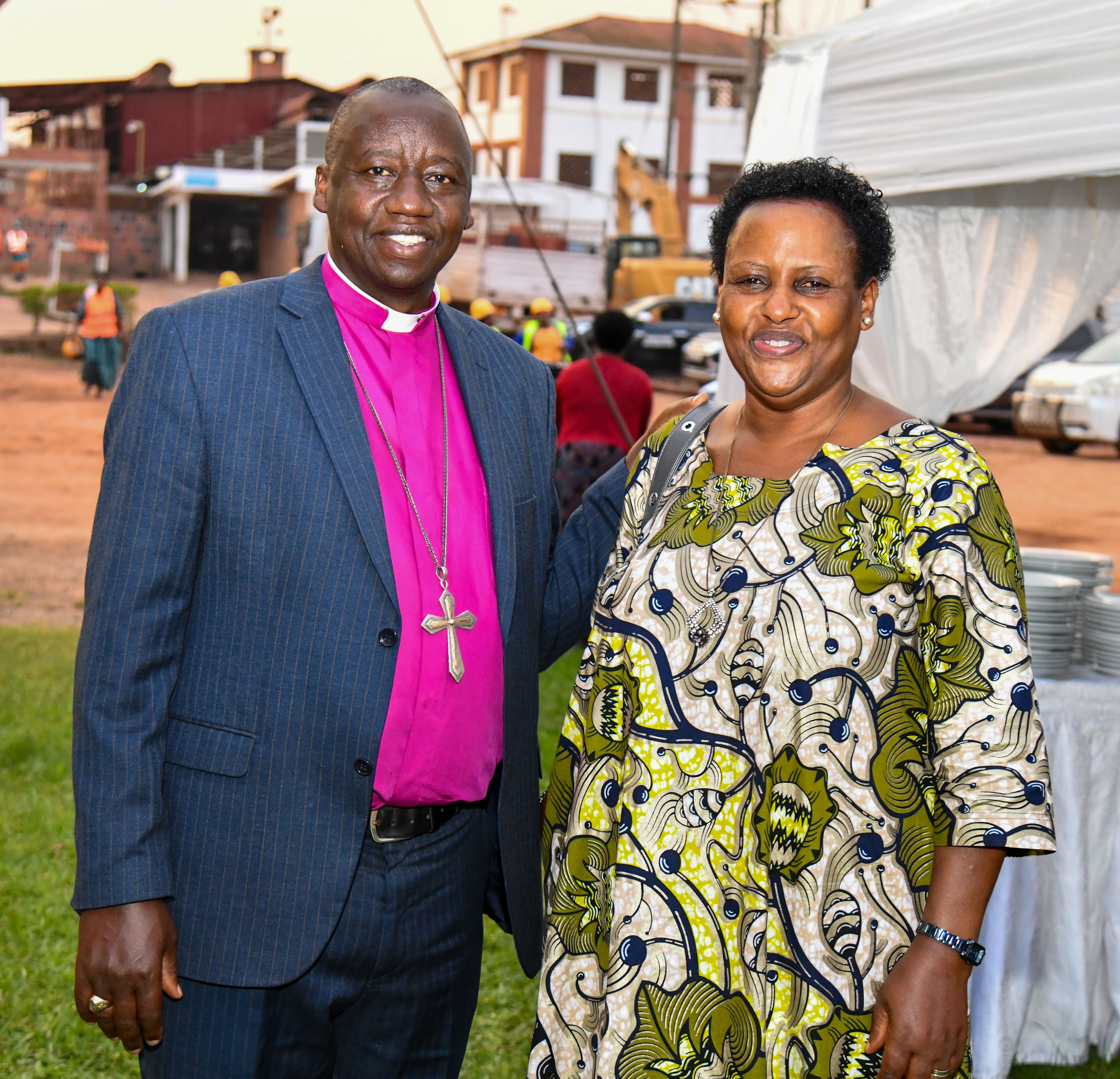
Bishop Johnson Twinomujuni (West Ankole Diocese) and his wife Joy Twinomujuni

Johnson Twinomujuni(born 11 August 1968) is an Anglican bishop in Uganda: since 2017 he has served as the Bishop of West Ankole.

Twinomujuni was born on 11 August 1968 in Muko, Mbarara District. He was educated at the African Bible College in Malawi; the Reformed Theological Seminary in Jackson, Mississippi, USA; and Uganda Christian University. He was ordained a deacon in December 1998, and a priest in December 1999. Twinomujuni has served the church in Kibingo Parish, Ankole Diocese, as Diocesan Missions Coordinator of Ankole Diocese, Chaplain Maryhill High school, Chaplain of St. Luke's Chapel Mbarara University of Science and Technology, and as part time lecturer of Christian Ethics, Old Testament, New Testament and Worldviews at Bishop Stuart University.

He also served as co-founder and principal of Uganda Bible Institute in Mbarara, Uganda. He was consecrated and enthroned Bishop on 28 May 2017 at St. Peter's Cathedral, Bweranyangi, Bushenyi.

== Overview ==
Twinomujuni succeeded Stanley Ntagali who was the acting Bishop of the Diocese after Yonah Katoneene retiring in 2016 October. He was elected the fourth Bishop of West Ankole Diocese on 20 April 2017 by the House of Bishops of the Church of Uganda. He was consecrated when the Diocese was going through hard times in its leadership but he restored peace and unity through the theme "Love that unites".

== Personal life ==
Twinomujuni married Joy in 1992. Together, they have six children. He enjoys playing piano, writing songs and books.

== See also ==
- Church of Uganda
- Yonah Katoneene
