= Wilberforce Kityo Luwalira =

Former Bishop of Namirembe

The Right Reverend Wilberforce Kityo Luwalira
- Bishop of Namirembe
- Church: Church of Uganda
- In office: 2009 – 8 December 2023
- Predecessor: Samuel Ssekkadde

Orders
- Ordination: 27 November 1988
- Consecration: 31 May 2009

Personal details
- Born: December 8, 1958 (age 67) Kiwenda, Wakiso District, Uganda
- Denomination: Anglican
- Education: Bishop Tucker Theological College (now part of Uganda Christian University)

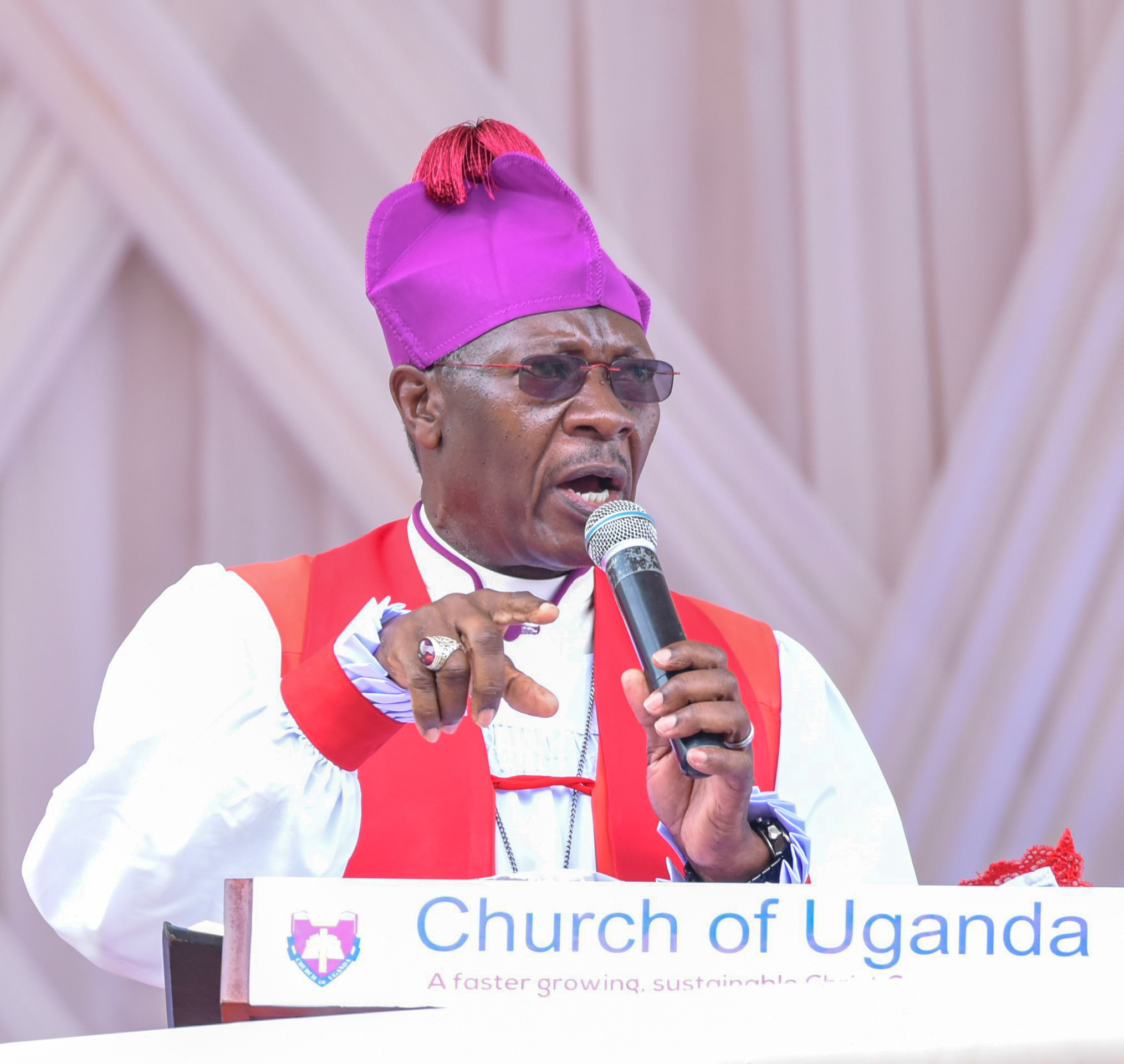
Bishop Wilberfoce Kityo Luwalira

Wilberforce Kityo Luwalira (born 8 December 1958) is a retired Ugandan Anglican bishop who served as the Bishop of Namirembe from 2009 to 8 December 2023.

== Early life and education ==
Luwalira was born on 8 December 1958 in Kiwenda, Wakiso District, Uganda. He attended Balitta Nursery School, Namulonge Primary School and Kololo Secondary School. He later pursued theological studies, earning a Diploma in Theology and a Bachelor's degree in Divinity from Bishop Tucker Theological College(now part of Uganda Christian University).

== Ordination and early ministry ==
Luwalira was made a deacon on 14 December 1986 and ordained a priest on 27 November 1988. Before his episcopal appointment, Luwalira served as Vicar of Namirembe Cathedral from 2001 to 2009.

== Episcopal Ministry ==
In 2009, Luwalira was elected by the House of Bishops and consecrated as the Bishop of Namirembe Diocese, the oldest Anglican diocese in Uganda. He was enthroned on 31 May 2009, succeeding Bishop Samuel Ssekkadde. During his episcopacy, he oversaw diocesan growth, refurbishment projects at Namirembe Cathedral and the establishment of 93.9 Namirembe FM.

== Bishop of Namirembe (2009-2023) ==
As Bishop, Luwalira provided both spiritual leadership and administrative oversight for the Diocese of Namirembe, which includes numerous parishes and archdeaconries in Central Uganda. His tenure was marked by church development and engagement with social issues. Luwalira once survived an attack while preaching as Bishop in St Paul's Cathedral in Namirembe where a stick welding man dressed in back cloth attacked him when he was preaching the Easter sunday sermon in 2018. The man that was later identified as Herbert Solomon Kaddu was apprehended after he missed his jump and fell on the altar and was later charged in court and remanded to Luzira Prison

== Retirement ==
Luwalira retired from active ministry on 8 December 2023, upon reaching the church of Uganda's mandatory retirement age. After a 14-year episcopacy, he handed over the leadership of Namirembe Diocese to Moses Banja, who was consecrated as the sixth bishop on 10 December 2023.

== Personal life ==
Luwalira is married to Faith Nakitende Luwalira, whom he met in 1988 while she was teaching at Gayaza High School. They married on 2 September 1989 at St Paul's Cathedral, Namirembe, and have four Children.

== Legacy and Community Involvement ==
During his leadership, Luwalira championed numerous diocesan projects, including church renovations and media initiatives, and was active in community development efforts. He has also been involved in Christian education and outreach within the church of Uganda.

== See also ==
- Samuel Balagadde Ssekkadde
- Namirembe
- Church of Uganda
- Gayaza High School
- Moses Banja
