= Emmanuel Karooro =

Ugandan educator

- Born: 1945 (age 80–81); Bushenyi District, Uganda
- Citizenship: Uganda
- Education: Kyambogo University (Diploma in Secondary Education); Makerere University (Bachelor of Education) (Masters of Education) (PhD in Education Management)
- Occupations: Educator, academic and academic administrator
- Years active: 1962 – present
- Known for: Education, Leadership Skills
- Title: Vice-Chancellor, Ibanda University
- Spouse: Mrs Karooro

Professor Emmanuel Karooro (born in 1945) is a Ugandan educator, academic and academic administrator, who serves as the vice-chancellor at Ibanda University, a private co-educational institution of higher learning in the Western Region of Uganda.

== Background and education ==
He was born in Katungu Village, Bumbaire sub-county, Bushenyi District, circa 1945.

Karooro first attended Kashenyi Primary School, transferring to Kyamuhunga Primary School for his elementary education, graduating Primary 6 in 1957. For his middle school studies, he attended Mbarara Junior Secondary School (today Mbarara High School). At Mbarara, he was classmates with Yoweri Museveni, the president of Uganda since 1986, and with the late Eriya Kategaya (4 July 1945 – 2 March 2013) a former First Deputy Prime Minister and Minister for East African Community Affairs in Uganda. He transferred to Fardez Secondary School, a private school in Mbarara, but left after completing Senior 3.

He became a licensed teacher at St. John Fisher School, in Ibanda. He then left teaching and worked as a court clerk at the Courthouse in Bushenyi Municipality, "for a few years". Later, in 1969, he joined Ntare School, to complete Senior 4 (S4), as a private student. After completing S4, he joined Kyambogo National Teachers’ College (today Kyambogo University), where he graduated with a Diploma in Secondary Education, in 1972.

In 1977, he went back to Ntare and enrolled into A-Level. Following that, he was admitted to Makerere University, where he studied Education, graduating with a Bachelor of Education in 1981. Later, in 1986, he was awarded a Masters of Education from the same university. Still later, in 2004, Makerere University awarded him a Doctor of Philosophy in Education Management.

== Career ==
His long tenure in Uganda's education arena includes service as Deputy Director of Kabale National Teachers’ College, and as the Principal of Kakoba National Teachers’ College (today Bishop Stuart University). He also served as the Vice Chancellor of Kampala International University’s Western Campus. He, in 2013, was the principal at the Ankole Western Institute of Science and Technology, (AWIST), the precursor to the Ankole Western University (AWU). Previously, in 2004, Karooro served as the Deputy Vice Chancellor of Bishop Stuart University.

In an interview with a Ugandan newspaper, The Observer (Uganda), Dr. Karooro was most proud of three achievements, as of January 2011: (a) the creation of a syllabus for the Diploma in Primary Education, (b) the transformation of Kakoba National Teacher's College into Bishop Stuart University, a process in which he was intimately involved and (c) the creation of the syllabus for the Diploma in Kiswahili.

In August 2017, Professor Emmanuel Karooro was named the Vice Chancellor of Ibanda University.

== See also ==
- List of universities in Uganda
- List of Ugandan university leaders
- Education in Uganda
