= George Katwesigye =

George Katwesigye is a retired Anglican bishop in Uganda. He served as the fourth Bishop of Kigezi from 1998 until 2014. During his reign, he oversaw pastoral and administrative leadership in the south western Ugandan Anglican diocese. He succeeded Bishop Wlliam Rukirande and was succeeded by Bishop George Bagamuhunda upon his retirement in March 2014.
