= Nathan Ahimbisibwe =

Ugandan bishop

- The Right Reverend
- Church: Church of Uganda
- Diocese: South Ankole
- See: South Ankole
- Installed: 8 January 2012
- Predecessor: Diocese newly created

Orders
- Ordination: 1997
- Consecration: 8 January 2012 by Henry Luke Orombi

Personal details
- Spouse: Lillian Ahimbisibwe
- Occupation: Bishop, theologian, lecturer
- Education: Reformed Theological Seminary

Nathan Ahimbisibwe is an Anglican bishop in Uganda: he has been Bishop of South Ankole since 2012.

Ahimbisibwe was educated at the Reformed Theological Seminary and ordained in 1997. He has served as a lecturer at Bishop Stuart University, Tutor of Theological Education in the Diocese of Ankole, Chaplain of Makerere University and as a Canon of St. Peter's Cathedral, Bweranyangi. He was consecrated at St. Matthew's Church, Kyamate on January 8, 2012.

== Episcopate ==
In September 2011, Ahimbisibwe was elected the first Bishop of the newly created South Ankole Diocese by the House of Bishops of Church of Uganda. The Diocese was carved out of Ankole and West Ankole dioceses. He was consecrated bishop on 8 January 2012 at St. Matthew's Cathedral, Kyamate, by Henry Luke Orombi.

== Ministry and leadership ==
Bishop Nathan Ahimbisibwe (South Ankole Diocese)

As a bishop, Ahimbisibwe has overseen growth and development within the South Ankole Diocese, including agricultural initiatives, mission work, and clergy development programs. Under his leadership, the diocese has been recognized for economic and community transformation initiatives. He has also been involved in national matters, including calls for peaceful elections and guidance on leadership and development within Uganda.

== Personal life ==
Ahimbisibwe is married to Lillian Ahimbisibwe.The couple celebrated 25 years of marriage in 2023.
