= William Magambo =

William Magambo was an Anglican bishop in Uganda: he was Bishop of West Ankole from 1997 to 2005.

== See also ==
- Church of Uganda
