= Manuel Muranga =

Ugandan academic and professor

Professor at Kabale University

Personal details
- Born: Manuel Muranga John Kamugisha
- Occupation: Academic, professor, priest

Manuel Muranga John Kamugisha is a Ugandan academic, priest, and professor at Kabale University.

He co-authored the Katondoozi ya Runyankore/Rukiga, a thesaurus of Runyankore/Rukiga by Fountain Publishers, with Yoweri Kaguta Museveni, Alice Muhoozi, and Gilbert Gumoshabe.

== Early life ==
Kamugisha was born in Uganda in 1951. He studied German, French, philosophy, and education in Kampala from 1973 to 1976, obtained a German teaching diploma through the Goethe-Institute in cooperation with LMU Munich in 1978, and completed a doctorate in German studies, English studies, and Romance studies at the University of Bayreuth in 1986.

== Academia and his contributions ==
He taught for several decades at Makerere University, rising through the ranks from lecturer to professor in languages, with particular emphasis on German and Runyakitara studies. He later became principal of Bishop Barham University College in Kabale, Uganda.

At Kabale University, Kamugisha has served in senior academic leadership within language studies and continues to supervise and promote teaching and scholarship in indigenous languages and literature. He is currently the head of the Department of Runyakitara at the university's Institute of Language Studies.

He has also contributed to scholarship on German studies in East Africa. In 2021, he and William Wagaba donated a book marking fifty years of teaching German at Makerere University.

Kamugisha has consistently advocated for the teaching, preservation, and formal examination of indigenous Ugandan languages. In 2025, he urged the government to integrate local languages into the national curriculum and make them examinable at all levels of education.

== See also ==
- Kabale University
- Bishop Barham University College
