= Marriage customs in Africa =

Marriage ceremonies within Africa vary greatly between countries due to the diversity of culture and religion throughout the continent. Africa has a population of over 1.4 billion people spread throughout 54 countries. The large size and extreme diversity of the continent leads to enormous diversity among the marriage ceremonies and traditions that take place. Marriage ceremonies throughout Africa vary greatly depending on the faith of the individuals. The World Book Encyclopedia states that 40% of Africans identify as Christian while 45% are Muslim.

Marriage customs vary across Africa as well and are shaped in part by regional, legal, and religious traditions. In North Africa, for example, Egyptian Muslim family law defines marriage as a contractual relationship, not a sacrament. By contrast, in parts of West Africa where Christian churches are influential, many Christians understand marriage in line with Catholic and Orthodox teaching as a sacrament of holy matrimony.

It is common practice in Africa to combine practices of major religions with local religious traditions. This is evident in marriage ceremonies where both Islamic and Christian marriages will also follow traditional practices adopted from tribal communities or smaller religions. The wedding is an exceptionally respected tradition within Africa due to their deeply rooted appreciation for the notion of family. Many African communities believe marriage is primarily about procreation and providing for children as this is seen as the foundation of society. They are often encouraged against marrying for love or sexual attraction.

== Diversity of African weddings ==
Due to the sheer size and diversity of Africa, wedding customs vary greatly not just between countries, but between local communities. There is a growing trend among African communities in which wedding ceremonies and marriage processes are blending traditional customs with contemporary religious or administrative practices. This is evident throughout many locations within Africa, where Catholic and Islamic followers will participate in traditional customs as well as those typical to their religion. The diversity of traditional beliefs throughout the country leads to enormous diversity among African communities. Despite this, there are also many similarities between African weddings and the customs that surround them.

== Ceremony and traditions ==
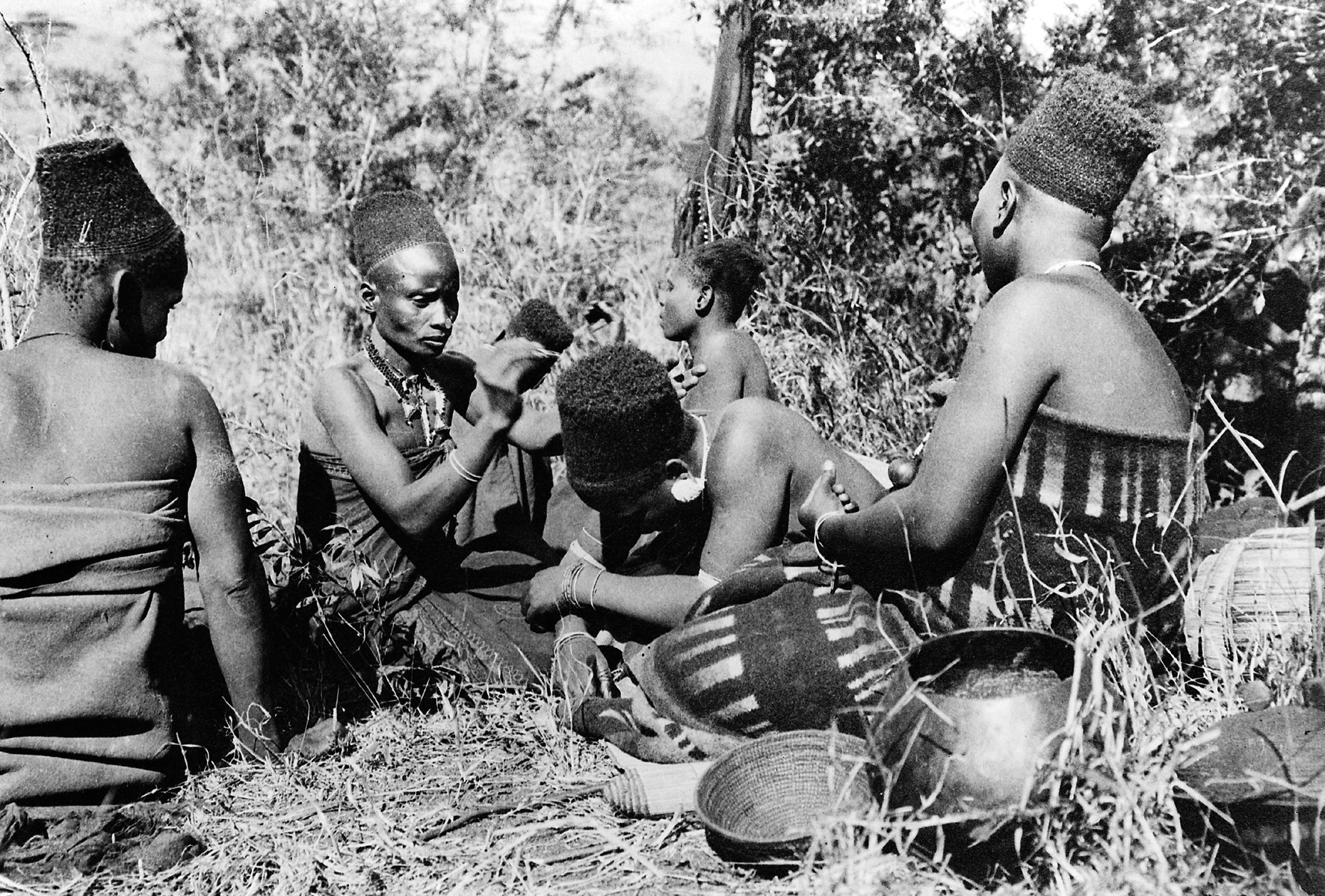
Preparing the head of a bride for a Zulu wedding dance

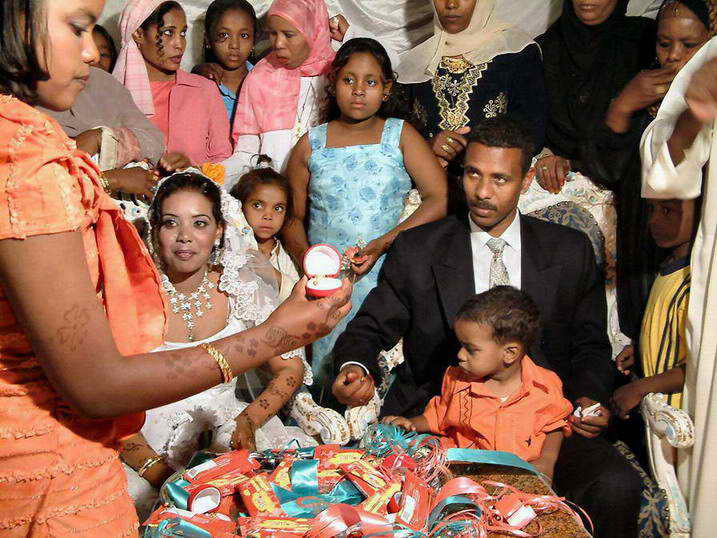
A Nubian wedding

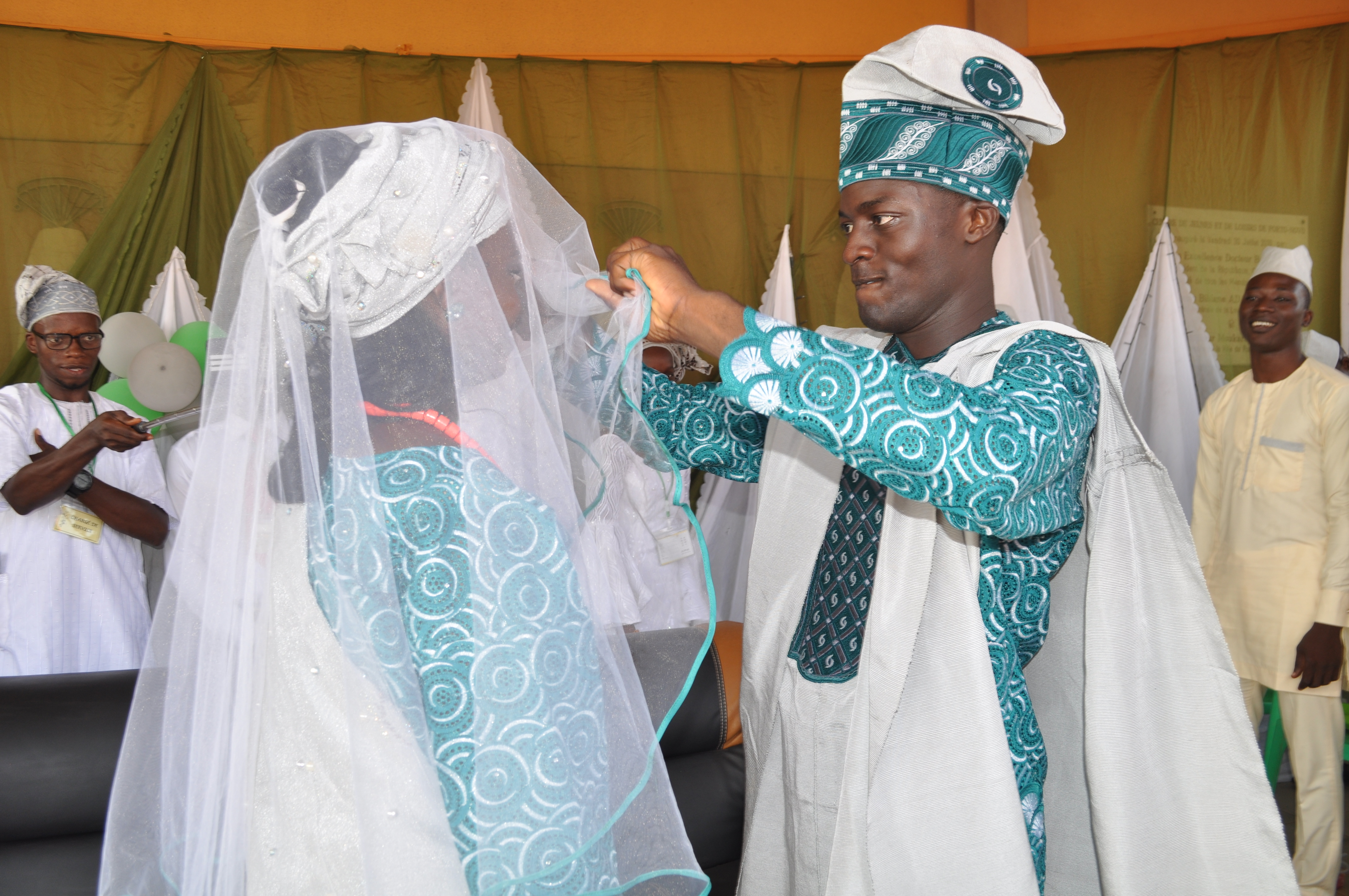
A wedding in Benin

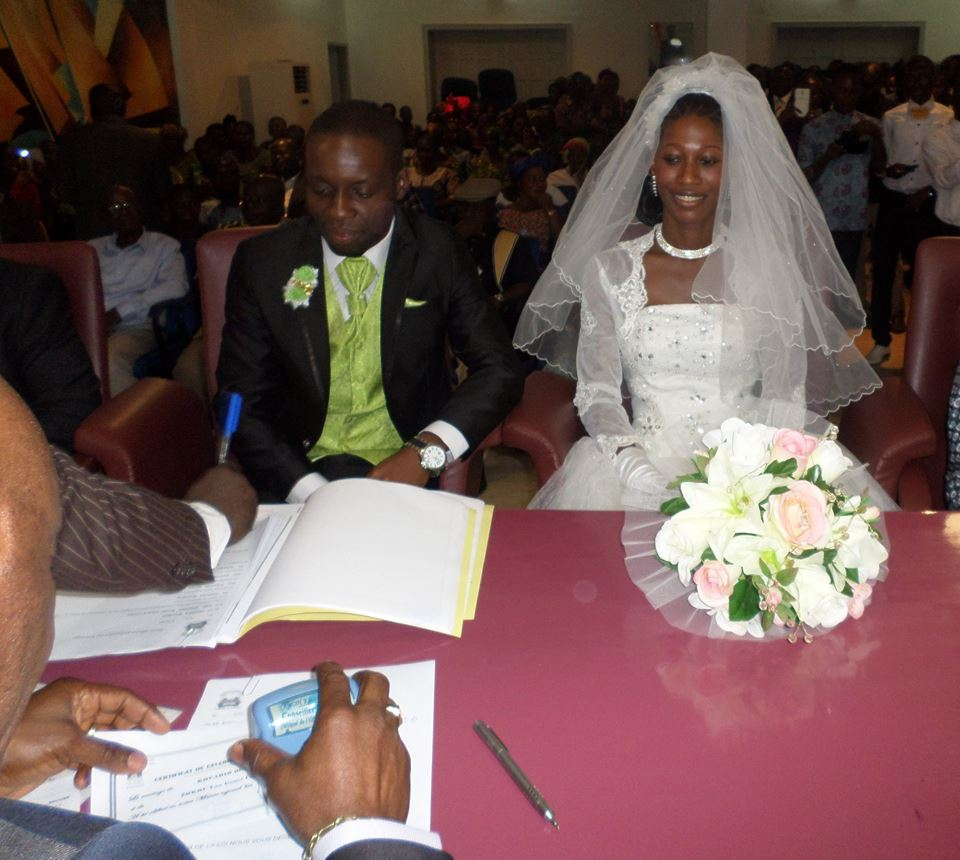
An Ivorian wedding

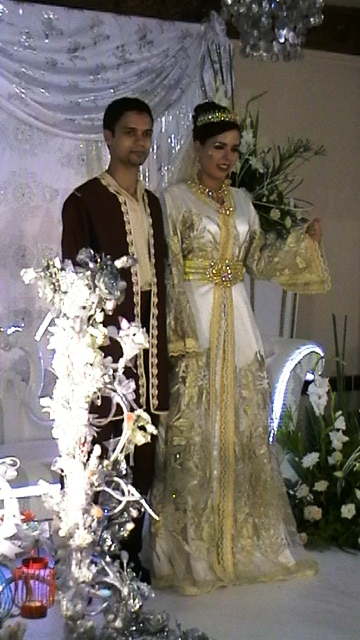
A Moroccan wedding

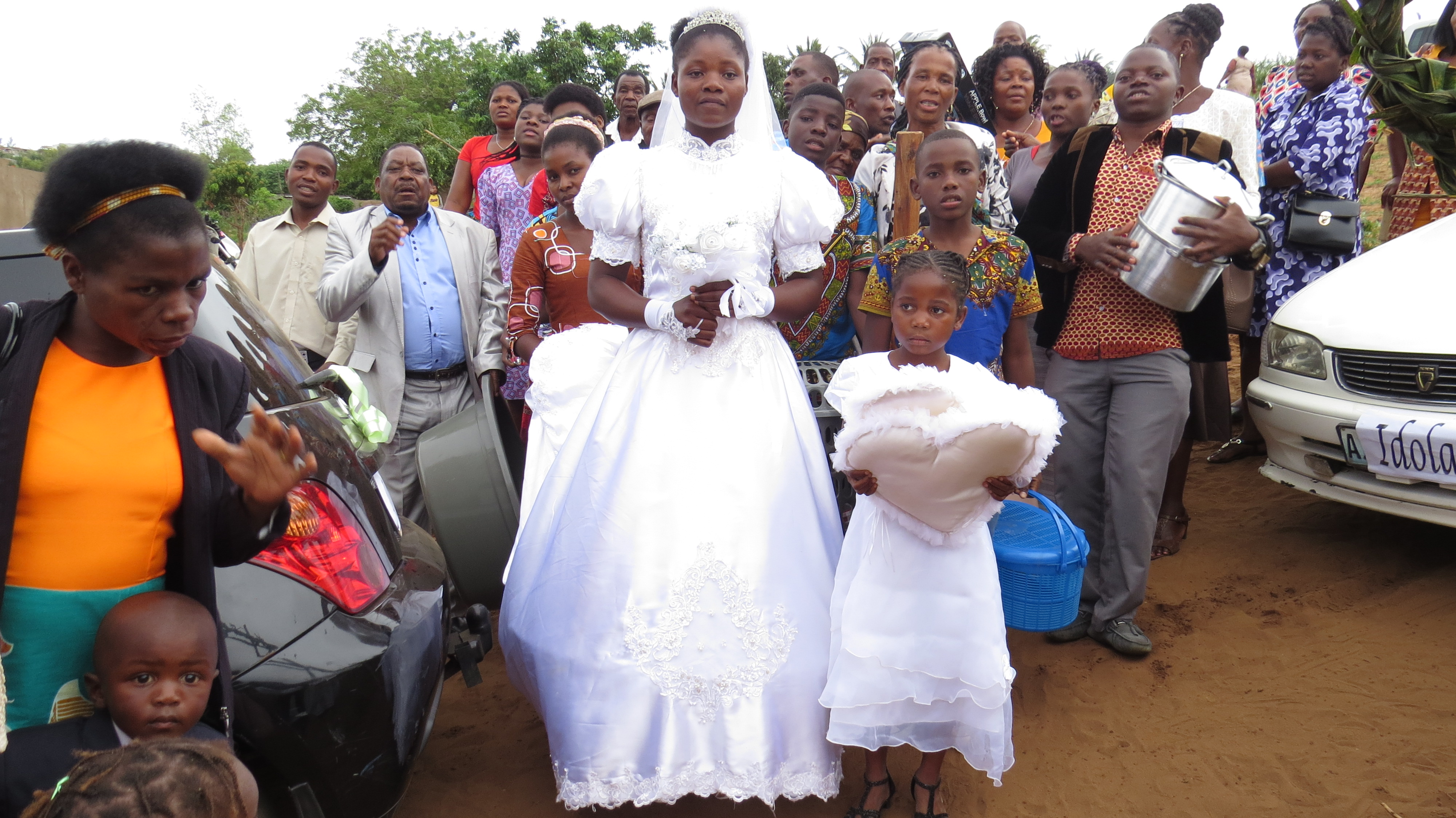
A Mozambican wedding

=== West Africa ===
The various marriage ceremonies performed in Africa begin with the initial introduction between the groom and bride. The Yoruba call this ‘Mo mi i mo e’ (know me and let me know you) while the Igbo call it ‘Ikutu aka n’ulo’ (Knock on the door). The family is typically involved within this process. Within many African communities, such as Nigerian ethnic groups, the engagement is where the traditional practices are performed.

It consists of an elaborate ceremony with heavy involvement from both families. The families dress in traditional and often colourful attire. It is common for the families to choose a colour to abide to in their dress code. The ceremony is typically held at the Bride's house. It is here that payment from the groom's family to the bride's is made and wedding rings are exchanged. Traditional customs relevant to the specific community are performed during this engagement ceremony, while the more modern marital customs will be performed at the religious wedding ceremony. The wedding will consist of more modern marital customs relevant to the religion of the participants families. Examples of this include the exchange of marital vows and modern wedding attire being worn by the bride and groom.

Examples of traditional marriage customs within Africa can be seen when analyzing the Yoruba people of Nigeria. The Yoruba integrate many traditional Yoruba marriage customs (such as arranged marriages and bridewealth) into their Christian and Islamic ceremonies. Marriage to this ethnic group is seen to be the foundation of their society rather than a bond between two people expressing love for one another. They are taught from a young age that marriage is about responsibility and providing to their society by having children. Children are taught through folktales that families built on love and attraction risk damaging the foundation of their community.

It is cemented into their culture that marriage is about procreation and providing the child with an environment in which they can thrive. It is of traditional belief that the child does not know when he is ready to marry, therefore the parents will make the decision for them. The Yoruba teach proverbs such as ““Bi omode ba to loko, aa fun loko, bi o ba to l’ada, aa fun l’ada” which translates to “when a child is ripe for hoe, he is given a hoe, if he is ripe for cutlass, he is given cutlass”.

When the parents believe the child is “ripe” for marriage, they will begin the process of seeking out a wife, often without the child knowing. The wife will also be sent a school where she is educated on her roles as a wife and importance of marriage. The traditional beliefs of the Yoruba share some similarities with traditional Catholic marriages, such as the wife being expected to remain a virgin until she is married. Marriage to the Yoruba was not focused on love but rather on structure and order. Some African academics have argued that this is a strong foundation for a society and that it is the woman's role to attend to household duties. This standpoint is particularly polarizing and has not been backed up by scientific data.

The West African people of Ghana participate in marital customs that differ greatly from many other African countries. Generally, the woman would not live with her husband and would remain living with her parents. The married couple would have fairly minimal interaction with one another, to such an extent that the wife would often refer to her husband as the father of her sons name. This form of relationship emphasizes the importance of marriage towards social stability and minimizes the significance of the bond between the husband and wife.

=== South Africa ===
African weddings often consist of modern Islamic/Christian ceremonies whilst intertwining traditional African beliefs and practices. An example of this is the common practice of bridewealth in Africa, particularly among the Zulu people. Bridewealth is when a groom's family pays the bride's family in traditional forms such as livestock, food and clothing to confirm the marriage. In modern practice, the payment is typically in forms of cash. To many Africans, bridewealth is considered to be a crucial part of a marriage ceremony and the marriage will not be acknowledged until the bridewealth has been paid.

While this is not a custom of Islamic or Christian marriage, many Africans adopt the traditional practice into their communities creating a strong link between their primary religion and their traditional and cultural beliefs. Enormous economic growth within the continent has caused the bridewealth payment to inflate so significantly that many couples are now straying from the tradition, instead opting for other forms of marriage.

The amount of bridewealth that a family is able to pay serves as an icon of her family's social status and indicates how much the family will be able to support the groom's. Bridewealth is seen as a form of “insurance” for the bride's family, as they know that if economic hardship entails they are able to rely on the groom's family to care of them. Some academics believe bridewealth leads to marriage stability, as the bride's family will put pressure on the daughter to remain in the marriage if the payment made was of significant value.

=== North Africa ===
In contrast to bridewealth practices, some African communities, such as many Moroccan ethnic groups, observe a marital custom often described as dowry, in which the bride receives gifts from her family to furnish and support her new household. In Egypt, Muslim family law structures similar transfers through the dower (mahr or sadaq) and a trousseau; both the dower and the property supplied by the bride's family legally remain her separate property rather than automatically becoming a part of her husband's estate. Among ruling and elite households in the late nineteenth and early twentieth centuries, marriages were frequently used to consolidate status and property, with palace officials being matched to women from harem quarters and the household head selecting husbands, providing trousseaus, and paying wedding costs to reinforce ties between families. By contrast, in most urban and rural families, elders arranged marriages by selecting spouses and negotiating the terms of the marriage contract, and fathers commonly paid the dower on behalf of sons who married at a young age.

Across many African societies, including northern Ghana, studies in bridewealth show that payments from a groom's family to a bride's family are used to confirm the marriage, link families, and recognize children as belonging to the husband's side. In northern Ghana, as in many patrilineal communities, these payments are tied to wives moving to live with their husband's relatives, which can give husbands and their male kin strong influence over women's daily lives, work, and choices in the home. Many activists and scholars argue that this situation can limit women's independence and sometimes be used to justify marital violence, because some people treat the payment as if it gives them rights over a woman.

At the same time, research from northern Ghana also shows that many women value bridewealth because it marks them as properly married and helps secure recognition and support for their children, so they may fear that ending the practice without wider changes would leave them more exposed and less protected. Because of this, some writers suggest changing how bridewealth is practiced—using local ideas about mutual care and community responsibility—to reduce harm and abuse while still keeping the social ties and sense of security that these marriage payments can provide.

=== The Continent of Africa ===
Due to Africa's expansive diversity, marriages within the continent are not limited to previously mentioned forms of marriage. Throughout the continent many individuals are electing for non-traditional forms of marriage that do not abide to traditional African marriage customs or more modern religious customs. This includes marriages performed in front of a registrar, bypassing the religious and traditional aspects of marriage entirely and instead opting for a simplified process which still provides the legal benefits of marriage. Some African couples are opting to bypass the legal marriage status entirely and alternatively having irregular unions as a symbol of their love and connection. Some academics believe this may not be a choice, but rather the outcome of current living conditions within the continent.

Many Africans are unable to produce the money required to fund a traditional wedding and pay dowry. They may perform their own simplified ceremonies as a response to their economic conditions. Other Africans are unable to participate in tribal or community centric ceremonies as they are required to move far from their community for employment. These irregular unions are performed when travelling back to their community was unrealistic or unachievable. The significance of marriage forming the foundation of a community is made obsolete if the couple were no longer a part of this community.

== Changing attitudes ==
Economic and social change is impacting contemporary attitudes towards marriage and relationships. Studies performed on students within Ghana showed strong evidence suggesting that young people within Africa are drawn towards civil or religious marriages as opposed to traditional marriages. The study revealed that men were more likely to want a traditional marriage than women.

Polygamy is heavily integrated into traditional Ghanaian marriage. The study also revealed that 73% of young people surveyed believe that polygamy is an outdated process. The results also show that 87% of students believe love is the most important factor of marriage, despite that in traditional Ghanaian culture, marriage and love share a relatively loose connection.

Within Ghana, it is common for the maternal uncle to pay dowry. 90% of surveyed students disagreed with this practice, believing the father should pay the dowry and pay for the costs of the child (such as education). A large majority of these students defended their answer by stating that everyone has a father while not everyone has an uncle. The researchers believe this may be due to a lack of support from their uncles with only 22% of students stating that their uncle had helped them throughout their education.

The results show a dramatic shift away from traditional beliefs within African communities, with young people holding more progressive attitudes towards relationships and marriage. The rapid economic advancement of Africa is having an enormous impact on the youth and the attitudes they hold towards marriage.

== Bridewealth and Dowry ==
Across most of Africa, bridewealth (also referred to as bride price or marriage payment) is a central element in making a marriage socially legitimate. It is commonly described as gifts, goods, and services that are transferred from the groom's kin to the bride's family, and has been widely practiced in 90% of societies across Africa. These transfers can include livestock, cash, and a variety of crafted objects that function as three-dimensional currencies.

In Central Africa, some of the most visually striking bridewealth items are large forged-iron currencies. One class of objects, often called blade currency, consists of oversized spear-like iron blades whose value is linked to their scale; such pieces were used to pay for large purchases, such as a canoe, or to pay bridewealth, and that many objects were acceptable as bridewealth, but among the most striking are the enormous iron blades of the Turumbu people. Related forged forms known as hoe currency are stylized iron hoes whose shapes overlap with knives and blades; these objects varied in value, but most often they were used as bridewealth, and their exaggerated size distinguishes them from ordinary tools. A broader overview describes the iron bridewealth blades of Lokele and Turumbu peoples and the blade currency of the Ngbaka as "prized objects" in which sculptural form and monetary function are closely intertwined.

These systems show how African marriage payments rely not only on money and livestock but also on highly valued three-dimensional objects, such as monumental iron blades and hoe-shaped currencies, whose exchange helps materialize and stabilize new marital alliances.

== Clothing ==
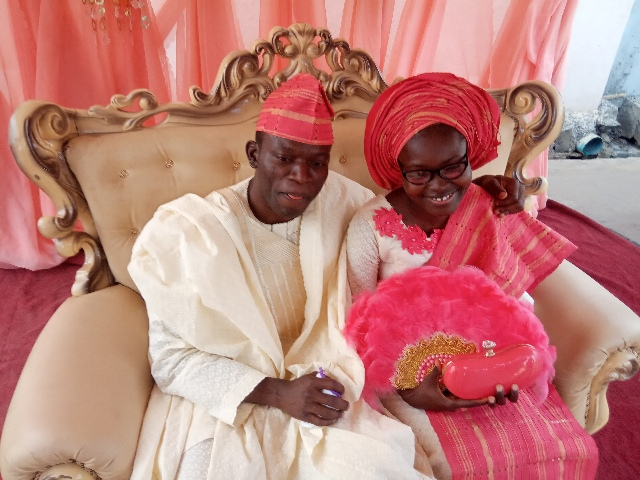
Yoruba wedding attire

To most African populations, clothing is a significant and important part of the engagement ceremony and the religious marriage ceremony. The wedding attire worn during these ceremonies depends heavily on the ethnic group being examined. Traditional African clothing is typically vibrant and colourful. These forms of attire are worn to integrate traditional African dress with modernized religious weddings. Catholic African communities most commonly dress in western wedding attire (white dress for women and a suit for men) for the religious ceremony and will utilize their communities’ traditional attire for other phases of the marriage process.
