= Church of Uganda =

Member province of the Anglican Communion

- Abbreviation: COU
- Classification: Protestant
- Orientation: Anglican
- Scripture: Protestant Bible
- Theology: Anglican doctrine
- Polity: Episcopal
- Primate: Stephen Kaziimba, Archbishop of Uganda and Bishop of Kampala
- Associations: Anglican Communion, GAFCON, Global South
- Headquarters: Namirembe Hill, Kampala
- Territory: Uganda
- Members: 16,297,000 (baptised; 2020) 13,311,801 (self-identified 2024)
- Official website: churchofuganda.org

The Church of Uganda (COU) is a member province of the Anglican Communion. Currently, there are 39 dioceses that make up the Church of Uganda, each headed by a bishop.

Each diocese is divided into archdeaconries, each headed by a senior priest known as an archdeacon. The archdeaconries are further subdivided into parishes, headed by a parish priest. Parishes are subdivided into sub-parishes, headed by lay readers. As of the 2014 census, 32% of Ugandans, or 10,941,268 people consider themselves affiliated with the church, down from 36.7% at the 2002 census. As of the 2024 census, 29% of Ugandans, or 13,311,801 people, identified with the Church of Uganda. In 2021, the World Christian Database, produced by the Center for the Study of Global Christianity at Gordon-Conwell Theological Seminary, estimated there were 16,297,000 members of the Church of Uganda. According to a peer-reviewed study in the Journal of Anglican Studies published in 2016 by the Cambridge University Press, the Church of Uganda has more than 8 million members, and approximately 795,000 active baptised members. In 2020, a peer-reviewed study found that the Church of Uganda may be the largest province of the Anglican Communion as measured by those actively identifying as Anglicans (but not by baptized membership) or 10.9 million Anglicans.

== History ==
=== Early development (1877–1897) ===
Shergold Smith and C. T. Wilson of the Church Missionary Society (CMS) were the first European Anglican missionaries to Uganda when they arrived in June 1877. They, along with others who arrived later, were based in the court of the Kabaka of Buganda near present-day Kampala.

Kabaka Mutesa I was known for his brutality and used the rivalries of the Anglicans, Roman Catholics and Muslims against each other to try to balance the influences of the powers that backed each group. His successor, Kabaka Mwanga II, took a more aggressive approach by expelling missionaries and insisting Christian converts abandon their faith on pain of torture or death.

In 1885, three Anglican Ugandans were killed and the arriving Archbishop of the province of Eastern Equatorial Africa, James Hannington, together with his party were arrested, detained and later executed at the orders of the Kabaka. Joseph Mukasa, a Roman Catholic priest and an official of the Bugandan court, rebuked the deed and was arrested and beheaded. This was the precursor to the large scale persecutions and killings from 1886 to 1887 of Anglicans and Roman Catholics. Those who were killed in that period are remembered as the Martyrs of Uganda.

This incident brought about the interference of Imperial British East Africa Company who backed a rebellion against Mwanga II by Christian and Muslim groups. Mwanga II was eventually overthrown in 1888 and was replaced by his half brother, Kiwewa. Kiwewa himself was overthrown by the Muslim faction in the court and was replaced by his Muslim brother, Kalema. British forces forced Kalema to abdicate and restored the throne to Mwanga II who in 1894 acceded to Uganda's status as a British protectorate. These incidents guaranteed the long term viability of the Anglican church in Uganda.

=== Diocese of Uganda (1897–1961) ===
Alfred Robert Tucker was made the third bishop of Eastern Equatorial Africa in 1890 and in 1899, the Diocese of Uganda was created and Tucker became the first Bishop of Uganda. In 1893 the first Ugandans were ordained and Buganda was established as a centre for evangelisation in the Great Lakes Area. One of the most celebrated indigenous Anglicans of that period is Apolo Kivebulaya, who is also known as the "Apostle to the Pygmies" for his work among the Pygmy people in eastern Congo.

Anglican growth in Uganda thrived by the turn of the 20th century and among the most notable contribution of the Anglican church was in the area of education. The first elementary schools were established in the 1890s. In 1913, the Bishop Tucker Theological College was established in Mukono and this institution was eventually expanded into what is now today the Uganda Christian University. Likewise the CMS took a lead in public health with the establishment of the Mengo Hospital in 1897.

Tucker proposed controversial measures to the Church constitution that would grant considerable power to the indigenous Anglicans in what was known as the Native Anglican Church. These radical proposals were opposed by the missionaries which resulted in a church hierarchy that was primarily expatriate until the independence of Uganda decades later. The domination of the CMS, and its later offshoot BCMS, led to a low church tradition in the Church. Revivalism was also made a hallmark of the Church with the outbreak of the East African Revival that began in Rwanda in 1936.

In the 1950s, the emergence of a generation of Ugandan Church leaders began to replace the expatriate hierarchy. Festo Kivengere, who later became the Bishop of Kigezi in 1972, travelled to Europe as an evangelist for the first time. As an international figure he was a joint founder of African Evangelistic Enterprise.

=== Province of Uganda, Rwanda and Burundi (1961–1980) ===
In 1961, the growth of the Church of Uganda was recognised in the Anglican Communion with the establishment of the province of Uganda and Ruanda-Urundi (later Province of Uganda, Rwanda and Burundi); the new province was inaugurated by Geoffrey Fisher, Archbishop of Canterbury, on 16 April 1961 at Namirembe Cathedral. Leslie Brown, Bishop of Namirembe (Bishop of Uganda until 1960), was elected in 1960) and installed (at the province's inauguration service) as first Primate, metropolitan, and archbishop. Brown was succeeded in 1966 by the first Ugandan archbishop, Erica Sabiti.

Relationships between the Anglicans and Roman Catholics that have been strained since the fighting of 1892 saw a new turn with the establishment of Uganda Joint Christian Council. This has included the small Orthodox Church of Uganda.

In 1971, Idi Amin gained power in a coup d'état and was initially greeted with enthusiasm by the general population of Uganda. The brutal and corrupt nature of the regime became evident soon and with the consecration of Janani Jakaliya Luwum as the new archbishop in 1974, the Anglican Church became more outspoken in opposition to the policies of Amin. This led to the 1977 execution of the Archbishop on Amin's orders.

=== Province of Uganda (1980–present) ===
The overthrowing of Amin in 1979 saw the gradual resumption of normal life in Uganda although peace remained elusive in northern Uganda with the insurgency by the Lord's Resistance Army (LRA). In 1997, Winifred Ochola, the wife of the first Bishop of Kitgum was killed by a landmine. Bishop Ochola has however continued to be committed in working towards peace and reconciliation in northern Uganda.

In 1980, Rwanda and Burundi were elevated to a separate province. The Church of Uganda has played an active role in promoting AIDS awareness and prevention in Uganda. As a result of these efforts and others in the country, Uganda has begun reversing the effects of AIDS on her society.

On 28 September 2011, the House of Bishops elected the first bishop for the new diocese of South Ankole, which was created from parts of the dioceses of Ankole and West Ankole.

== Archbishop ==
The current primate and metropolitan archbishop is Stephen Kaziimba, who was enthroned in March 2020. The Diocese of Kampala is the fixed episcopal see of the archbishop, but unlike many other fixed metropolitical sees, the incumbent is not officially known as Archbishop of Kampala, but bears the longer title Archbishop of Uganda and Bishop of Kampala.

== Dioceses ==
Ankole; Sheldon Mwesigwa: Bukedi; Nicodemus Engwalas-Okille: Bunyoro-Kitara; Nathan Kyamanywa: Busoga; Michael Kyomya: Diocese of Central Buganda; Jackson Matovu: Diocese of Central Busoga; Diocese of Eastern Busoga; Kampala; Samuel Stephen Kaziimba Mugalu: Kigezi; Gaddie Nkanjuna: Kinkiizi; Dan Zoreka: Kitgum; Wilson Kitara: Kumi; Thomas Edison Irigei: Lango; John Charles Odurkami: Luweero; Eridard Kironde Nsubuga: Madi & West Nile; Joel Obetia: Masindi-Kitara; vacant: Mbale; Samwiri Namakhetsa Khaemba Wabulakha: Mityana; Stephen Kaziimba	Muhabura; Mbitse Godfrey: Mukono; James Ssebaggala: Diocese of Namirembe; Wilberforce Kityo Luwalira: Nebbi; Alphonse Watho-kudi: North Karamoja; James Nasak: North Kigezi; Edward Muhima: North Mbale; Dan Gimadu: Northern Uganda; Johnson Gakumba: Ruwenzori; Rauben Kisembo: Sebei; Augustine Joe Arapyona Salimo: Soroti; Charles Bernard Obaikol-Ebitu: South Ankole; Nathan Ahimbisibwe: South Karamoja (Moroto); Joseph Abura: South Rwenzori; Nason Baluku: West Ankole; William Magambo: West Buganda; Henry Katumba-Tamale

== Ecumenical relations ==
Like many other Anglican churches, the Anglican Church of Uganda is a member of the ecumenical World Council of Churches. In October 2009, the Ugandan Church's leadership reacted to the Vatican's proposed creation of personal ordinariates for disaffected traditionalist Anglicans by saying that although he welcomed ecumenical dialogue and shared moral theology with the Catholic Church, the current GAFCON structures already meet the spiritual and pastoral needs of conservative Anglicans in Africa.

== Ordination of women ==
The Church of Uganda has ordained women to the diaconate since 1973 and to the priesthood since 1983. The first woman to serve as a Cathedral Provost was appointed and installed in 2019. In 2022, Archbishop Kaziimba announced his support for the ordination of women to the episcopate and confirmed that a woman may be ordained a bishop in the Church of Uganda.

In 2026, the Church of Uganda installed the first woman to serve as Dean of All Saints' Cathedral in Kampala.

== Anglican realignment ==
The Church of Uganda has been active in the Anglican realignment, both at the Global South and the Fellowship of Confessing Anglicans. They are one of the African churches which broke communion with the Episcopal Church of the United States due to their acceptance of non-celibate homosexuality, and have agreed to provide pastoral oversight and support to new Anglican churches in North America in the ongoing Anglican realignment. However, as of 2021, the Episcopal Diocese of West Texas shares ministry partnerships with the Ugandan dioceses of Kampala, Bunyoro-Kitara, and Nebbi. In 2005, Archbishop Henry Orombi, then the Primate, also criticised the Church of England's acceptance of clergy in same-sex civil partnerships.

On 2 September 2007, the Ugandan church consecrated an American bishop, John Guernsey, from Virginia, to oversee many of the American parishes which it supports. The Church of Uganda declared itself in full communion with the Anglican Church in North America, a denomination formed by American and Canadian Anglicans opposed to their national churches' actions regarding homosexuality, on 23 June 2009.

In 2013, Archbishop Stanley Ntagali disapproved of the Church of England's decision to allow clergy in civil partnerships to become bishops. He said, "It is very discouraging to hear that the Church of England, which once brought the Gospel of Jesus Christ to Uganda, has taken such a significant step away from that very gospel that brought life, light, and hope to us." Archbishop Ntagali also reiterated his opposition to similar decisions made by other western Anglican provinces. “Sadly we must also declare that if the Church of England continues in this contrary direction we must further separate ourselves from it and we are prepared to take the same actions as those prompted by the decisions of The Episcopal Church (USA) and the Anglican Church of Canada ten years ago.”

The Church of Uganda was represented at GAFCON III, held in Jerusalem, on 17–22 June 2018, by a large 272 members delegation, including Archbishop Ntagali. In 2023, Bishops Kaziimba and Ntagali supported the introduction of the Ugandan Anti-Homosexuality Act, although they did not express support for the use of the death penalty for convicted homosexuals.

== See also ==
- Religion in Uganda
