= Anglican dioceses of Northern Uganda =

Dioceses of the Church of Uganda

The Anglican dioceses of Northern Uganda are the Anglican presence in (roughly) the Northern Region, Uganda; they are part of the Church of Uganda. The remaining dioceses of the Church are in the areas of Buganda, of Eastern Uganda, of Ankole and Kigezi, and of Rwenzori.

== Diocese of Northern Uganda ==
The first diocese to be erected in this area was that called simply the Diocese of Northern Uganda, which was split from the Diocese on the Upper Nile in 1961. Today the mother church is St Philip's Cathedral, Gulu.

=== Bishops of Northern Uganda ===
- 1961 – 1964/5: Keith Russell (previously an assistant bishop on the Upper Nile)
  - 1964–1966: Silvanus Wani, assistant bishop
- bef. Jan 1966 – 1969: Silvanus Wani (became Bishop of Madi and West Nile)
- 1969–1974: Janani Luwum (became Archbishop of Uganda, Rwanda, Burundi and Boga-Zaire)
- 1974 – 1989 (res.): Benoni Ogwal (in exile 1977–1980)
  - Allan Oboma, assistant bishop
- 1989 – 1998 (ret.): Allan Oboma
- 1998 – 2009 (ret.): Nelson Onono-Onweng
- 20 December 2009 – present: Bishop Godfrey Loum

== Diocese of Madi—West Nile ==
Erected from Northern Uganda diocese in 1969; See at Emmanuel Cathedral, Mvara (near Arua).

=== Bishops of Madi—West Nile ===
- 1969 – 1977: Silvanus Wani (became Archbishop of Uganda, Rwanda, Burundi and Boga-Zaire)
- ? – 1987: Remelia Ringtho
- 1988 – 1990 (d.): Ephraim Adrale
- ? – 1994 (d.): Ariaka Nguma
- 1995 – 2005 (ret.): Lee Drati
- 26 November 2005 – ?: Joel Obetia
- 26 February 2017 – present: Collins Andaku

== Diocese of Karamoja ==
Split in 1976 from the Diocese of Soroti; St Philip's Cathedral, Moroto.

=== Bishops of Karamoja ===
- 1976 – 1981 (res.): Brian Herd (previously Archdeacon of Karamoja; consecrated 11 January 1976, by Janani Luwum, Archbishop of Uganda, Rwanda, Burundi and Boga-Zaire, at Namirembe Cathedral; exiled March 1977 – ?)
- 1981–?: Howell Davies
- 1987 – June 2006 (d.): Peter Lomongin
- 27 May 2007 – present: Joseph Abura (consecrated 27 May 2007)

== Diocese of Lango ==
Erected from Northern Uganda, 1976; Lira Cathedral.

=== Bishops of Lango ===
- 1976 – 2001: Melkizedek Otim (consecrated 11 January 1976, by Janani Luwum, Archbishop of Uganda, Rwanda, Burundi and Boga-Zaire, at Namirembe Cathedral)
- 2001–2017 (ret.): Charles Odurkami
- 13 August 2017 – present: Alfred Olwa

== Diocese of Nebbi ==
Created in 1993 from the Diocese of Madi—West Nile; St Stephen's Cathedral, Goli.

=== Bishops of Nebbi ===
- 1993 - 2004: Henry Luke Orombi
- 2004 - 2020: Alphonse Watho-kudi
- 2021 - Present: Pons Ozelle Awinjo

== Diocese of Kitgum ==
Created in 1995 from Northern Uganda diocese; the See is Kitgum, where stands All Saints' Cathedral.

=== Bishops of Kitgum ===
- 1995–2002: Baker Ochola
- 2002–2018: Benjamin Ojwang
- 2018–present: Wilson Kitara

== Diocese of North Karamoja ==
Christ Church Cathedral, Kotido is the mother church of this diocese, erected from Karamoja in 2007.

=== Bishops of North Karamoja ===
- 1 July 2007 – ?: James Nasak

== Diocese of West Lango ==
Split from Lango diocese, 2014; St Peter's Cathedral, Aduku.

=== Bishops of West Lango ===
- 2014–2018: Alfred Acur
- 2019–present: Julius Nina

== See also ==
- Anglican dioceses of Ankole and Kigezi
- Anglican dioceses of Buganda
- Anglican dioceses of Eastern Uganda
- Anglican dioceses of Rwenzori
- List of Roman Catholic dioceses in Uganda
