= Yonasani Rwakaikara =

Ugandan Anglican bishop (1918–1994)

Yonasani Kaijamurubi Rwakaikara (18 June 1918 – 1994) was a Ugandan Anglican bishop in the Anglican Church of Uganda.

== Early life and education ==
Rwakaikara was born in Bugungu in present day Masindi District on 18th June 1918. He was educated at Kabalega Primary School and Clifton Theological College.

== Career ==
He was ordained both deacon and priest in 1966 and consecrated a bishop on 10 April 1967 to serve as assistant bishop of Rwenzori. He remained assistant bishop until 25 June 1972, when he was installed diocesan Bishop of Rwenzori. He was translated to become Bishop of Bunyoro-Kitara, a post he held from 1981 to 1989.

== Personal life ==
Rwakaikara was married to Dinah with whom they had 9 children. He died in 1994 at the age of 76.

== See also ==
- Patrick Wakula
- Edward Bamucwanira
- George Turyasingura
