= John Wasikye =

Ugandan Anglican bishop

The Right Reverend John Alfred Wasikye
- Bishop of Mbale
- Church: Anglican Church of Uganda
- Diocese: Mbale
- In office: 1976 – 1979
- Predecessor: (see Diocese of Mbale)
- Successor: Akisoferi Wesonga
- Previous posts: Archdeacon of Bugisu and Sebei (1965–1973); Dean of Mbale (1973–1976)

Orders
- Ordination: 1956 (Priest)
- Consecration: 1976

Personal details
- Born: August 9, 1929 Buruku, Bukiende, Uganda
- Died: 1979 Uganda
- Denomination: Anglicanism
- Education: Buwalasi Theological College

John Alfred Wasikye was an Anglican bishop in Uganda.

Wasikye was educated at Buwalasi Theological College. He was ordained deacon in 1954 and priest in 1956. He served in the diocese until 1961 and in Mbale from 1961. He was Archdeacon of Bugisu and Sebei from 1965 to 1973; and Dean of Mbale from 1973 to 1976 when he became its bishop. He was killed by forces loyal to president Idi Amin in 1979.

== Personal life and Education ==
Wasikye was born on 9 August 1929 to Yosamu Kirya and Elsie Namakoye of Buruku, Bukiende. Wasikye attended Nabumali Junior school, Nabumali High school, and later Buwalasi Theological College.

== See also ==
- Jackson Matovu
- George Sinabulya
- Patrick Wakula
