= Alfred Acur =

Ugandan bishop

Alfred Acur Okodi
- Born: Alfred Acur; Alebtong District
- Education: Uganda Christian University
- Occupation: bishop
- Known for: Bishop
- Title: Bishop

Alfred Acur Okodi (born 25 December 1954) is an Anglican bishop who presided over the Diocese of West Lango from 2014 to 2018 in Uganda.

== Early life ==
Okodi was born in Alebtong District, Northern Uganda and was ordained into ministry in 1991 at Aloi Archdeaconary head quarters.

== Education and career ==
He was educated at Uganda Christian University formerly known as Bishop Tucker Theological College where he earned a Bachelor of Divinity Degree. He later obtained a Master of Arts in Missions from the Nairobi Evangelical School of Theology in 1996. He has served as Vicar of St. Stephen, Nsambya; Archdeacon of Kampala South; Sub Dean of All Saints' Cathedral, Kampala and Kampala Diocesan Mission Coordinator.

Okodi was ordained as bishop of West Lango diocese on October 21st 2014 in a ceremony that was attended by president Yoweri Museveni.

== Personal life ==
Okodi is married to Deborah Okodi.

== See also ==
- Dan Gimadu
- Peter Mudonyi
- Nathan Muwombi
