= Gidudu =

Gidudu is a surname. Notable people with the surname include:

- Patrick Gidudu, Anglican bishop in Uganda
- Samuel Gidudu (born 1968), Anglican bishop in Uganda
