= Lucas Gonahasa =

Anglican bishop that serves in uganda

Alupakusadi Lucas Gonahasa was an Anglican bishop who served in Uganda. He was the assistant bishop of Bukedi from 1978 to 1983; and assistant bishop of Kampala from 1983 to 1997.

Gonahasa was educated at Buwalasi Theological College. He served the Bishop of the Upper Nile from 1958 to 1960; of Ankole-Kigezi from 1960 to 1967; and was a Senior Chaplain to the Forces from 1967 to 1977.

He died in 2008.

== See also ==
- Stephen Tomusange
- Lucian Usher-Wilson
- Yoramu Bamunoba
