= Yona Okoth =

Ugandan Anglican archbishop

The Most Reverend Yona Okoth
- Archbishop of Uganda
- Church: Church of Uganda
- Archdiocese: Uganda
- Province: Church of Uganda
- Installed: 1984
- Term ended: 1995
- Predecessor: Silvanus Wani
- Successor: Livingstone Mpalanyi Nkoyoyo
- Previous post: Bishop of Bukedi

Personal details
- Born: 1926 Maundo Village, Nagongera, Tororo District, Eastern Uganda
- Died: 2001 (aged 74–75)
- Denomination: Anglicanism
- Children: 9
- Education: Buwalasi Theological College; St. Augustine College, Canterbury; Wycliffe College, University of Toronto

Yona Okoth (1926–2001) was an Anglican archbishop in Uganda.

Okoth was born in Maundo Village, Nagongera, Tororo District , Eastern Uganda and was educated at Buwalasi Theological College; he was ordained a priest in 1955 and attended St. Augustine College, Canterbury, England in 1963, where he graduated with a diploma in theology. In 1966, he studied at Wycliffe College at the University of Toronto, where he received a Licentiate in Theology.

He served in Mbale diocese (where he was Diocesan Treasurer) and was appointed Provincial Secretary of the then Church of Uganda, Rwanda, Burundi and Boga-Zaire in 1965. He was also Provincial Secretary of the Anglican Church of Uganda from 1965 to 1972 when he was appointed Bishop of Bukedi.

In 1977, he left Uganda and went into self-exile in the United States out of frustration during the rule of dictator Idi Amin; during this time, he read for a Doctor of Divinity degree at Wycliffe College.

He was consecrated archbishop of Uganda in 1984 and was in office until 1995.

== Family ==
He was married and had nine children.

== See also ==
- Paul Naimanhye
- Micheal Lubowa
- Jackson Matovu

Anglican Communion titles
Preceded by Silvanus Wani	Primate of the Anglican Church of Uganda; 1983-1995	Succeeded by Livingstone Mpalanyi Nkoyoyo
