= Patrick Kyaligonza =

Former Bishop of Rwenzori

Patrick Kyaligonza (1960-2010) was an Anglican bishop in Uganda: he served as the Bishop of Rwenzori from 2009 to 2010.

== Early life and education ==
Kyaligonza was born in Rwenyana and went to school in Mpanga. He studied for the priesthood at Bishop Balya Theological College in Fort Portal and later Uganda Christian University where he attained a Bachelors degree in Divinity.

== Career ==
Kyaligonza served as a teacher and theological instructor at Can. Apollo Teachers College and Nyarukoma Primary School.

He served the church in Kyenjojo, Bundibugyo and Kabarole. At different times he was also diocesan treasurer, education coordinator, diocesan secretary and Dean of St. John's Cathedral, Fort Portal.

== Personal life ==
Kyaligonza was married to Rose Kyaligonza with whom he had 3 children.

== Death ==
Kyaligonza died on February 11, 2010 in a fatal accident along Mityana, Fort portal road.

== See also ==
- James Nasak
- Allan Oboma
- Paul Luzinda
- Church of Uganda
