= Paul Luzinda =

Anglican bishop that serves in Uganda

Eria Paul Luzinda Kizito was an Anglican bishop who served in Uganda: he was the third Bishop of Mukono, serving from 2002 to 2010.

== Early life and education ==
Luzinda was born in a Christian family of Yosiya Kwalo and Brandina Namatovu of Matugga. He attended Kawempe Muslim Primary School and later Bishop Thakar theological college (now Uganda Christian University).

== Career ==
In 1982, Luzinda worked as a postal superintendent at Lugazi post office. He left post office to join ministry and was later ordained as a priest in 1984 after his studies at Bishop Thakar Theological college.

== Personal life ==
Luzinda was married to Margaret Luzinda with whome he had 6 children (3 boys and 3 girls). Luzinda and Margaret were married for 38 years but Margaret died in 2010.

One year later, Luzinda remarried Florence Luzinda with whom he stays to date.

== See also ==
- Patrick Kyaligonza
- Allan Oboma
- James Nasak
