= Dan Zoreka =

Ugandan Anglican bishop

Dan Zoreka is an Anglican bishop in Uganda: He has been Bishop of Kinkiizi since 2010.He was consenrated at the age of 48 and is nottable for being the first bishop in the pronvince elected without the rank of canon beforehand.

== Early life ==
Zoreka came from a humble upbringing in southwestern Uganda. His father was a tailor with multiple wives.

== Education ==
Zoreka was educated at Uganda Christian University. He was health co-ordinator for the Diocese of Kinkiizi from 2004 to 2010.

== See also ==
- John Ntegyereize
- Wilson Kitara
- Baker Ochola
