= Thembo =

Thembo is a surname. Notable people with this surname include:

- Thembo Nyombi, Ugandan economist and politician
- Jackson Nzerebende Thembo, retired Anglican bishop
