= Arthur Kitching =

Arthur Kitching may refer to:

- Arthur Kitching (bishop) (1875–1960), Anglican missionary, bishop and author
- Arthur Kitching (politician) (1840–1919), English stockbroker and Liberal politician
