= Jamii ya Kupatanisha =

- Founder: Nelson Onono Onweng
- Type: Not-for-profit / NGO
- Legal status: Active
- Purpose: Conflict management, peacebuilding, human rights
- Headquarters: Gulu City
- Region served: Northern Region, Uganda (Amuru District, Gulu District, Pader District, Kitgum District)
- Founder: Nelson Onono Onweng
- Remarks: Focuses on areas affected by the LRA war and post-conflict reintegration.

Jamii ya Kupatanisha (JYAK) is a not for profit organization in Uganda.

It is a national organization for conflict management, peace building, and promotion of human rights in Uganda. It operates in the northern region of Uganda especially the areas that were affected by the Lords Resistance Army (LRA) war, such as Amuru, Gulu, Pader, and Kitgum districts. Its main offices are located in Gulu City. Jamii ya Kupatanisha is a Swahili phrase meaning 'Fellowship of Reconciliation'.

Jamii ya Kupatanisha was founded by Nelson Onono Onweng as a Peace Club in 1968. In the past years, this organization sought for a peaceful end to the LRA wars in Northern Uganda. In 2007, they started engaging in post conflict and reintegration programs.
