= Janet Wesonga =

Ugandan politician

Mayor of Mbale
- In office October 1967 – 1971
- Succeeded by: Naome Nora Aryada

Personal details
- Born: Janet Tingu c. 1928 Uganda
- Spouse: Akisoferi Wesonga
- Occupation: Politician
- Known for: First African woman mayor in Uganda
- Committees: Executive Committee of the World Council of Churches

Janet Wesonga, née Tingu (born c.1928) is a Ugandan former local politician. As mayor of Mbale, she was Uganda's first African woman mayor. An Anglican, she also served on the Executive Committee of the World Council of Churches.

== Life ==
Janet Tingu came from Buwabwala. She married Akisoferi Wesonga, later Bishop of Mbale.

In 1962 she was active in the Ugandan independence movement.

In October 1967, aged 39, Wesonga became mayor of Mbale, Uganda. She was Mayor of Mbale for four years.

At the 1968 Assembly of the World Council of Churches (WCC) in Uppsala, Wesonga was elected as one of only two women on the WCC's Executive Committee. This enabled her to participate in WCC activity across the globe. In 1969 Wesonga attended a WCC Executive Committee Meeting in Tulsa, Oklahoma, later also visiting St. Louis, Missouri. In 1971 she attended the WCC Executive Committee meeting in Sofia, Bulgaria.

In 1979 Wesonga was part of a delegation representing the Church of Uganda at the Mother's Union conference in Australia.
