= Sam Kahuma =

Anglican bishop in Uganda

The Right Reverend Samuel Kuhama
- Bishop of Bunyoro-Kitara
- Church: Church of Uganda
- Diocese: Bunyoro-Kitara
- In office: 2016–present
- Predecessor: Nathan Kyamanywa
- Other posts: Dean of St. Peter's Cathedral, Duhaga

Orders
- Ordination: 1990 (diaconate); 1991 (priesthood)
- Consecration: 4 December 2016

Personal details
- Education: Uganda Christian University; University of Gloucestershire

Samuel Kahuma (called Sam) is an Anglican bishop in Uganda: Since 2016, he has been the Bishop of Bunyoro-Kitara.

Kahuma was educated at Uganda Christian University and the University of Gloucestershire; and ordained a deacon in 1990 and a priest in 1991. He has served in Kibingo; Hoima, where he was Archdeacon; and Duhaga where he was Dean of St. Peter's Cathedral. His last post before consecration was as Diocesan Secretary of Bunyoro-Kitara.

He was consecrated and enthroned on 4 December 2016.

Kahuma retired in August 2024 after serving for 8 years.

== Biography ==
Kahuma was born to the late Yolamu Meihaho and Joyce Meihaho on 24 August 1959 in Hoima. He sat his Primary leaving examinations in 1975 at Bulindi Primary school. In 1976, he joined Aggrey Memorial Secondary School in Kampala but the following year, he changed to Duhaga secondary school from where he sat for O-levels in 1979. In 1984, he enrolled for Grade 111 teachers course at Duhaga teachers' college and graduated as a primary school teacher.

== Personal life ==
Kahuma is married to Sarah Kahuma and together they have one son.

== See also ==
- George Bagamuhunda
- George Katwesigye
- Festo Kivengere
