= Paul Masaba =

Ugandan Anglican bishop

The Right Reverend Paul Masaba
- Bishop of Sebei
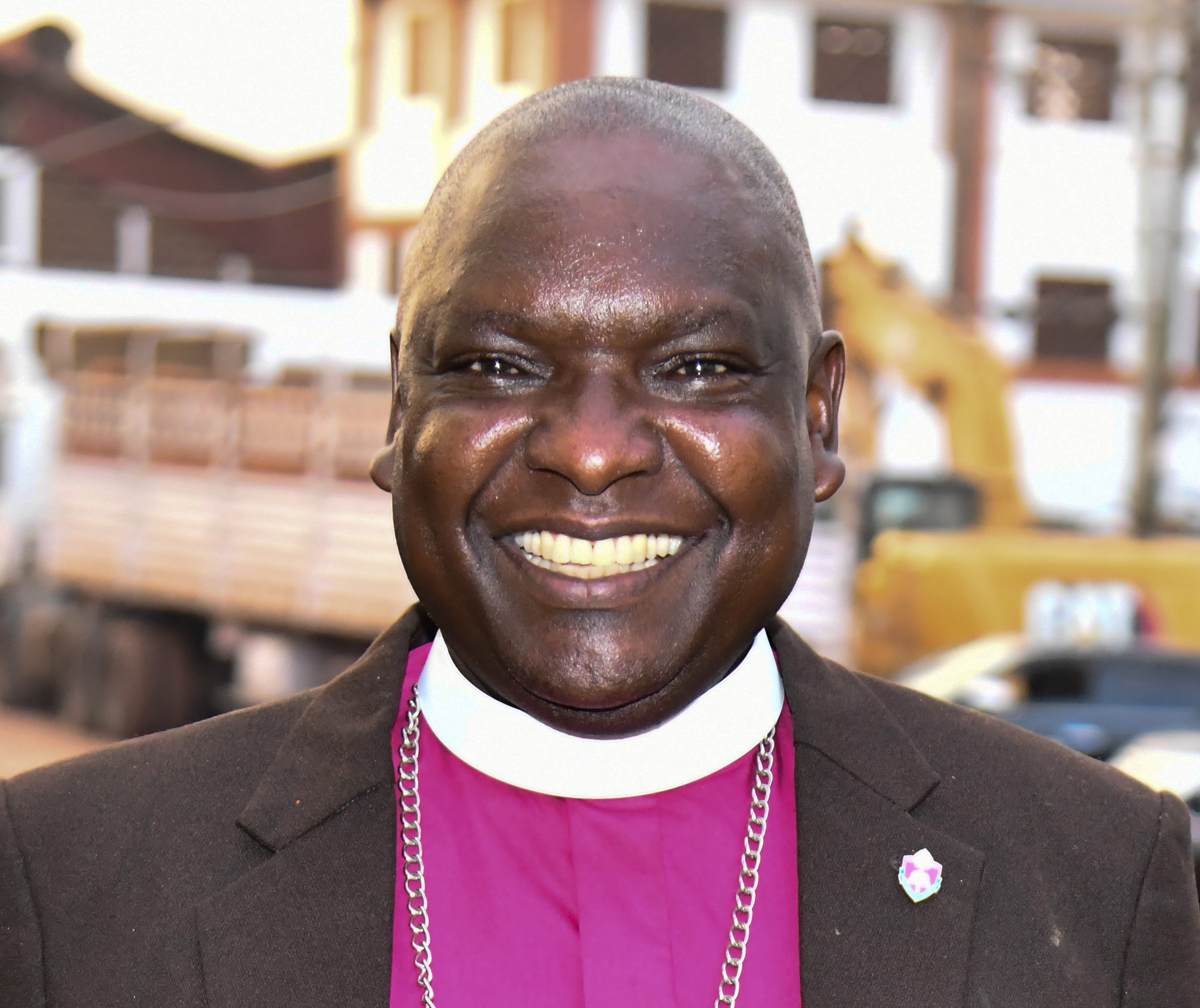
- Church: Church of Uganda
- Diocese: Sebei
- In office: 2015–present
- Predecessor: Augustine Salimo

Orders
- Consecration: 12 April 2015

Personal details
- Education: Uganda Christian University; Kapchorwa Primary Teachers College

Paul Kiptoo Masaba is an Anglican bishop in Uganda.He has been Bishop of Sebei Diocese in Eastern Uganda, since 2015, and on 21 March 2026, he celebrated his 10th year anniversary as Bishop.

== Personal life ==
He is married to Agnes Violet Masaba, and they have six children.

Masaba was educated at Uganda Christian University.

Also a teacher, he has served as a lay reader, a priest and an archdeacon.

He was consecrated a bishop on 12 April 2015, at St Peter's Cathedral, Kakomuyra, Kapchorwa as the first Bishop of the diocese. He celebrated his 10th anniversary in service on September 28, 2025.

== Early life and education ==
Paul Kiptoo Masaba received his early education in Eastern Uganda.He trained as a teacher at Kapchorwa Primary Teacher College before pursuing theological education at Uganda Christian University,where he obtained a Bachelor of Divinity and Diploma in Theology.

== Ministry ==
Masaba begun his ministry as a lay leader at Katung Church of Uganda and later served as a parish priest in Tuban Parish. He also worked as a diocesan youth and children's worker in Sebei Diocese.

Before becoming a Bishop, he served as Archdeacon and Vicar of St Peter's Cathedral, Sebei Diocese from 2011.He also served as a Sunday school teacher and primary school teacher in Kapchorwa.

== Episcopacy ==
During his tenure, Masaba has overseen various development initiatives including the construction of new cathedral, schools and health facilities within Sebei Diocese.In September 2025, he marked ten years as a bishop, with church leaders commending his leadership and development efforts in the Diocese.

== See also ==
- Augustine Salimo
- Sam Egesa
- Sebei sub- region
- Church of Uganda
