= Nicodemus Okille =

Ugandan Anglican bishop

Nicodemus Eng'walas Okille is a retired Anglican archbishop in Uganda who served as the Bishop of Bukedi Diocese from 1984 to November 2012. He provided long-term leadership in eastern Uganda before retiring after nearly three decades of service.

== Early life and education ==
Okille was educated at Uganda Christian University and was ordained in 1973. He served in the Diocese of Bukedi.

== Bishop of Bukedi ==
Okille succeeded Yona Okoth as the second Bishop of Bukedi in 1984 and led the diocese for 28 years. Under his leadership, the diocese continued to grow in spiritual outreach and community engagement across several districts of Eastern Uganda. In his later years as bishop, including calling for community reconciliation and peace during times of local tension.

Okille retired in November 2012, handing over to Canon Samuel George Bogere Egesa, who was elected by the House of Bishops to succeed him the following year.

== Later service ==
Following his retirement from the Bukedi Diocese, Okille was appointed caretaker Bishop of the Soroti Diocese by Archbishop Starnley Ntagali to oversee diocesan affairs during the interregnum.

== See also ==
- Church of Uganda
- Sam Egesa
