= Howell Davies =

Howell Davies may refer to:

- Howell Davies (politician) (1851–1932), British leather merchant and Liberal politician
- Howell Davies (rugby, born 1885) (1885–1961), Welsh rugby union hooker and rugby league footballer
- Howell Davies (rugby union, born 1959), Welsh rugby union fullback
- Howell Davies (bishop) (1927–2009), Anglican bishop in Africa

== See also ==
- Howell Davis, Welsh pirate
