= Ariaka Nguma =

Anglican bishop in Uganda

Bishop Caleb Ariaka Mawa Nguma
- In office 1990
- Preceded by: Ephraim Adrale
- Succeeded by: Enock Drati
- Title: Bishop

Personal life
- Died: 1994 Uganda
- Cause of death: Motor accident
- Citizenship: Uganda
- Notable work: The Revival Movement as a Driving Force for Church Growth in Uganda
- Occupation: bishop

Religious life
- Religion: Anglican

Caleb Ariaka Mawa Nguma was an Anglican Bishop of Madi-West Nile in 1990 and served until his death four years later.

== Career ==
Nguma served as an Anglican bishop of Madi-West Nile succeeding Bishop Ephraim Adrale in 1990 and later succeeded by Dr. Enock Drati in 1994. He authored work titled, "The Revival movement as a driving force for church growth in Uganda in 1987.This was published by the Asian center for Theological studies and mission in Seoul, Korea.

== Death ==
He died in a motor accident in 1994 while traveling from Arua to Kampala for a meeting of the house of Bishops.

== See also ==
- Joel Obetia
- Remelia Ringtho
- Silvanus Wani
