= Peter Lomongin =

Former Ugandan Anglican bishop

Peter Lomongin (1944–2006) was an Anglican bishop in Uganda: He was Bishop of Karamoja from 1987 until his death.

Lomongin was educated at Uganda Christian University and ordained in 1973. He served in the Diocese of Soroti until 1976 when he became Archdeacon of Karamoja.
