= George Sinabulya =

George Sinabulya is an Anglican bishop in Uganda who served as the inaugural Bishop of the Anglican Diocese of Central Buganda, from its creation in 1995 until 2001.

His son Michael, is the third and current Bishop of Central Buganda.

== See also ==
- Cyprian Bamwoze
- Eliphaz Maari
- Ephraim Adrale
