= Ojwang =

Ojwang is a surname. Notable people with the surname include:

- Albert Ojwang (1993/1994-2025), Kenyan teacher and blogger
- Benjamin Ojwang (1952-2019), Ugandan Anglican bishop
- Chrisant Ojwang (born 1998), Kenyan rugby sevens player
- Jackton Boma Ojwang (born 1950), Kenyan lawyer
