= John Ntegyereize =

Ugandan Anglican bishop (1946–2021)

The Rt Rev John Wilson Ntegyereize
- Bishop of Kinkizi
- Church: Church of Uganda
- Diocese: Diocese of Kinkizi
- In office: 7 May 1995 – 10 October 2010
- Predecessor: None (first bishop)
- Successor: Dan Zoleka

Orders
- Consecration: 7 May 1995

Personal details
- Born: 9 September 1946 Kanungu District, Uganda
- Died: 6 May 2021 (aged 74) Bwindi Community Hospital, Kanungu District, Uganda
- Spouse: Jocelyn Ntegyereize (m. 1971; d. 2013); Pamelah (m. 2014)
- Children: 5
- Occupation: Anglican bishop

John Wilson Ntegyereize (1946 – 6 May 2021) was an Anglican bishop in Uganda. He was Archdeacon then Bishop of Kinkiizi, serving from 1995 until 2010.

== Early life and education ==
Ntegyereize was born on 9 September 1946 in Kanungu District, Uganda. He attended several primary schools such as Rweyerezo Church School, Kambuga Primary School. Later attended Ruhayana Junior Secondary School.

== Ministry ==
Ntegyereize began his pastoral duties as a church school teacher at Kisenyi Church of Uganda. He was the Archdeacon of Nyakatare Archdeaconry up to 1994. On 7 May 1995, he was consecrated as the first Bishop of Kinkizi diocese that was created out of the Diocese of North Kigezi. He served as the Bishop for this diocese for fifteen (15) years that is until 10 October 2010. He was succeeded by Bishop Dan Zoleka.

== Personal life ==
Ntegyereize was married to Jocelyn Ntegyereize in 1971 and they had four daughters. She died in 2013.

In 2014, he married Pamelah and they have one child.

When Bishop lost his first wife Jocelyn, he developed a number of illnesses that completely drained him until he passed on. Emeritus Bishop passed on at Bwindi Community Hospital in Kanungu district in 2021.

== See also ==
- Dan Zoleka
- Bwindi Community Hospital
- Kanungu district
