= Bogere =

Bogere is a surname. Notable people with the surname include:

- Cassandra Bogere (born 2005), Norwegian-Swedish footballer
- James Bogere (born 2008), Ugandan footballer
- Patrick Bogere (born 1981), Swedish boxer and criminal
- Sharif Bogere (born 1988), Ugandan boxer

== See also ==
- Samuel George Bogere Egesa, Anglican bishop in Uganda
