= Wilson Kitara =

Wilson Kitara is an Anglican bishop in Uganda: he has been Bishop of Kitgum since 2018.

Kitara was born on 5 January 1971, educated at Uganda Christian University and ordained in 2001.

== Early life and education ==
Kitara was born on January 5, 1971. He received a Bachelor of Divinity from Bishop Tucker Theological College in 1998 and later a Master of Arts in Theology and Health Care Management from Uganda Christian University in 2014.

== Career ==
Kitara served the Diocese of Kitgum as a parish priest, school chaplain, teacher and Diocesan Secretary. He was consecrated and enthroned on 25th November 2018 at All Saints' Cathedral, in Kitgum district

He is an advocate of girl child education.

== Personal life ==
Kitara is married to Ketty Auma Kitara and they have three children.

== See also ==
- Benjamin Ojwang
- Baker Ochola
