= Charles Odurkami =

Uganda anglican bishop

The Rt Rev John Charles Odurkami
- Bishop of Lango
- Church: Anglican Church of Uganda
- Diocese: Lango
- In office: 2001–2017
- Predecessor: Melchizedek Otim
- Other post: Caretaker Bishop of Kumi (2019)

Orders
- Consecration: April 2001 by Livingstone Mpalanyi Nkoyooyo

Personal details
- Born: 19 August 1952 (age 73) Akot, Kwania District, Uganda
- Denomination: Anglican
- Education: Bishop Tucker Theological College

John Charles Odurkami (or Odur Kami, or Odur-kami) is an Anglican bishop in Uganda; he was Bishop of Lango from 2001 to 2017.

He was appointed caretaker Bishop of Kumi in 2019.

== Early life and education ==
Odurkami was born on 19 August 1952 in Akot, Kwania District in the Lango sub-region of northern Uganda. He joined Bishop Tucker Theological College in 1985 and attained a Diploma in Theology.

== Ordained ministry ==
Odurkami was consecrated as the second bishop of West Lango diocese by Archbishop Livingstone Mpalanyi Nkoyooyo in April 2001.He succeeded Melchizedek Otim who was the pioneer bishop for the diocese for 25 years.
