= Samwiri Wabulakha =

Ugandan Anglican bishop

The Right Reverend Samwiri Wabulakha
- Church: Church of Uganda
- Diocese: Diocese of Mbale
- In office: –2008

Personal details
- Born: Samwiri Namakhetsa Khaemba Wabulakha Uganda
- Denomination: Anglicanism
- Occupation: Anglican bishop
- Profession: Clergyman

Samwiri Namakhetsa Khaemba Wabulakha is an Anglican bishop in Uganda: he was Bishop of Mbale until 2008.
