= Diocese of Lango =

Anglican diocese in Northern Uganda

The Diocese of Lango is a diocese of the Church of Uganda. It encompasses congregations in the Lango sub-region of Northern Uganda with its headquarters in Boroboro, Lira city. The diocese is headed by Bishop Alfred Olwa who was consecrated on 13th August 2017 in Boroboro All Saints Cathedral. Lango Diocese is one of the 37 diocese in the Province of the Church of Uganda and operates within five government districts in Lango serving over one million people. The diocese founded and operates 188 primary schools and 30 secondary schools and one university, All Saints University Lango.

== Location ==
Lango Diocese's headquarters in All Saints Cathederal, Boroboro, Lira City.

== See also ==
- Anglican dioceses of Northern Uganda
- All Saints University Lango
