= Benezeri Kisembo =

Benezeri Kisembo was an Anglican bishop in Uganda. He served as the Bishop of Rwenzori until 2009.
