= Alfred Olwa =

Ugandan Anglican bishop (born 1964)

The Right Reverend Alfred Olwa
- Bishop of Lango
- Church: Church of Uganda
- Diocese: Lango Diocese
- Elected: 31 May 2017
- In office: 2017–present
- Predecessor: John Charles Odurkami

Orders
- Consecration: 13 August 2017 by Stanley Ntagali

Personal details
- Born: 29 January 1964 (age 62) Namasale, Lango sub-region, Uganda
- Denomination: Anglicanism
- Education: Bishop Tucker Theological College, Makerere University, Brunel University, Moore College

Alfred Olwa (born 29 January 1964) is a Ugandan Anglican bishop who has served as the third Bishop of the Diocese of Lango in the Church of Uganda since 2017. His ministry is noted for its emphasis on peace-building, community development, and spiritual leadership in northern Uganda.

== Early life and education ==
Alfred Olwa was born on 29 January 1964 in Namasale, in the Lango sub-region of northern Uganda. During his youth, Olwa briefly explored traditional spiritual practices before embracing Christianity. He was baptized in 1975 at Namasale Church of Uganda and confirmed three years later.

Olwa pursued theological education at Bishop Tucker Theological College, Mukono, earning a Diploma in Theology in 1990. He later graduated with a Bachelor of Divinity from Makerere University in 1998. He also undertook postgraduate studies in the United Kingdom, earning a Postgraduate Diploma in Biblical Interpretation and a Master of Theology by Research. In 2012, he completed his Doctor of Philosophy (PhD) at Moore College, Sydney, focusing on themes of reconciliation and mission in Ugandan Anglicanism.

== Ordained ministry ==
Olwa was ordained as a priest in the Church of Uganda in 1994. He began his ministry as a curate at Lira Urban Parish and later served as Chaplain to Lira Hospital and Uganda Government Prisons. He was appointed parish priest at St. Peter’s Church of Uganda, Dokolo, and subsequently served as Archdeacon of Lira and Diocesan Secretary of Lango Diocese.

In addition to his pastoral work, Olwa had a distinguished academic career at Uganda Christian University (UCU), where he served as a lecturer, Head of the Department of Theology, and Dean of the Faculty of Divinity and Theology. He was instrumental in developing theological education and fostering dialogue between faith and contemporary issues.

== Episcopal ministry ==
On 31 May 2017, Alfred Olwa was elected as the third Bishop of Lango Diocese by the House of Bishops of the Church of Uganda, succeeding Bishop John Charles Odurkami. He was consecrated and enthroned on 13 August 2017 at All Saints Cathedral, Boroboro, Lira, in a ceremony presided over by Archbishop Stanley Ntagali.

As bishop, Olwa has focused on peace-building and reconciliation in a region affected by past conflict. He has also promoted livelihood and development initiatives within the Diocese of Lango, including encouraging agricultural projects such as cotton farming to support community development and diocese-run programs.

He has also been involved in public discussions on peace and reconciliation in northern Uganda, including engagements with cultural and community leadership structures in the Lango sub-region.

Olwa is also an influential member of the House of Bishops and serves on various boards and committees within the Church of Uganda, contributing to church governance and policy.

== See also ==
- Church of Uganda
- Archbishop of Uganda
