= Melkizedek Otim =

Ugandan Anglican bishop (1935–2019)

Melkizedek Otim (1935-2019) was an Anglican bishop in Uganda: he was Bishop of Lango from 1976 until 2001.

== Life and career ==
Otim was educated at Uganda Christian University and ordained deacon in 1967 and priest in 1979. He served the Diocese of Northern Uganda until his elevation to the episcopate.
