= Lee Drati =

Ugandan bishop

- Born: Lee Drati; 27 October 1939
- Died: 9 December 2011 (aged 72)
- Education: Uganda Christian University
- Occupation: Bishop
- Years active: 1973–2011
- Title: Bishop
- Predecessor: Caleb Ariaka Mawa Nguma
- Successor: Joel Obetia

Enoch Lee Drati (1939–2011) was an Anglican bishop for Madi-West Nile Uganda in 1995 and served for a decade.

== Early life and education ==
Drati was educated at Uganda Christian University and ordained in 1973.

== Death ==
Drati died on 9th December 2011 while in California where he had gone for treatment of cancer. There was a clash between his family and the church on where to be laid to rest as the family members wanted him to be buried at the new burial site as indicated in his will as opposed to the old site of earlier fallen bishops as suggested by the church. He was laid to rest on 30th December at Emmanuel Cathedral.
