= Joseph Abura =

Anglican bishop in Uganda

Joseph Abura is an Anglican bishop in Uganda: he has been Bishop of Karamoja since 2006.
