= Brian Herd =

Anglican bishop

William Brian Herd (1931 – 18 July 2016) was an Anglican bishop in Uganda.

Herd was born in Belfast in 1931; educated at Clifton Theological College and ordained in 1959. After a curacy in Wolverhampton he served in Uganda. He was Archdeacon of Karamoja from 1970 to 1975; and its Bishop from his consecration on 11 January 1976.

Herd was the last white Anglican bishop of the Ugandan Church; he was expelled from the country following the murder of Archbishop Janani Luwum. Four other Anglican bishops also fled the country at the same time.

He died on 18 July 2016.

== Family ==
Herd was married to Norma Rothwell; she died May 30, 2019. They had three daughters.
