= Reuben Kisembo =

Anglican bishop of Rwenzori, Uganda

Reuben Bizarwenda Kisembo is an Anglican bishop in Uganda: he has been Bishop of Rwenzori since 2011.
