= Asanasio Maraka =

Ugandan Anglican bishop

The Right Reverend Asanasio Maraka
- Bishop of Soroti
- Church: Church of Uganda
- Diocese: Soroti
- In office: 1965–1976
- Predecessor: Stephen Tomusange
- Successor: Geresom Ilukor

Orders
- Consecration: 28 November 1965

Personal details
- Born: Uganda
- Denomination: Anglicanism
- Profession: Anglican bishop

Asanasio Maraka was an Anglican bishop in Uganda.

Maraka was ordained as a deacon in 1946 and as a priest in 1948. From 1946 to 1951, he served with the CMS, followed by service in the Anglican Diocese of Kumi from 1952 to 1960, and in Soroti from 1960 to 1963. He was Archdeacon of Teso from 1963 to 1965, after which he was consecrated as the Bishop of Soroti.
