= George Erwau =

Ugandan Anglican bishop

George William Erwau was an Anglican bishop who served in Uganda during the early 21st-century: he was Bishop of Soroti from 6 September 2009 to 12 July 2018.
