= Buhugu =

Town in Uganda

- Town
- Location in Uganda
- Coordinates: 1.2000°N 34.3167°E
- Country: Uganda
- Region: Eastern Region
- District: Sironko District
- County: Budadiri
- Sub-county: Buhugu Sub-county
- Elevation: 1,203 m (3,947 ft)
- Time zone: EAT (UTC+3)

Buhugu is a town in Uganda. It has a cathedral, the seat of the Diocese of North Mbale.The town is located in Sironko District in the Eastern Region of Uganda.
