= Baker Ochola =

Anglican bishop (born 1936)

MacLeod Baker Ochola (born. 1936) also Macleod or Macleord) is an Anglican bishop in Uganda: he was the inaugural Bishop of Kitgum, serving from 1995 until 2002.

== Background of Baker Ochola ==
Baker Ochola was born in Madiopei, an area that is now part of Lamwo District in northern Uganda. He began formal education at the age of fourteen, later training as a professional teacher before entering church leadership.

He was educated at Uganda Christian University and ordained deacon in 1969, and priest in 1972. He has served in the Dioceses of Northern Uganda and Boga-Zaire.

== Religious leadership and service ==
He served as the first Bishop of the Anglican Diocese of Kitgum, a position he held from 1995 until his retirement in 2002. During his years of service, he was actively involved in community outreach, visiting schools and engaging with local populations. He also participated in both national and international forums, where he consistently promoted messages of peace, unity, and reconciliation.

== Role in peacebuilding initiatives ==
During the period of insurgency in Northern Uganda, Baker Ochola recognized the widespread suffering affecting communities. In response, he joined other religious leaders to form a united platform aimed at promoting peace. This collaboration later became known as the Acholi Religious Leaders Peace Initiative (ARLPI), which played a great role in advocating for nonviolence and dialogue.

== See also ==
- Ariaka Nguma
- Joel Obetia
- Remelia Ringtho
