= Patrick Wakula =

Anglican bishop in Uganda

Patrick Wakula is an Anglican bishop in Uganda: he has been Bishop of Central Busoga since 2016.

Wakula was educated at Makerere University. He was ordained a deacon in 1995 and a priest in 1997. He served in Kamuli District. Later he was Archdeacon of Kaliro then Jinja. Wakula was consecrated and enthroned as Bishop on 13 November 2016 at All Saints’ Pro-Cathedral, Iganga.

== See also ==
- Nathan Kyamanywa
- Johnson Twinomujuni
- Bernard Obaikol
