= Anglican dioceses of Rwenzori =

Dioceses of the Church of Uganda

The Anglican dioceses of Rwenzori are the Anglican presence in (roughly) the areas near the Rwenzori mountains; they are part of the Church of Uganda. The remaining dioceses of the Church are in the areas of Buganda, of Eastern Uganda, of Northern Uganda, and of Ankole and Kigezi.

== Diocese of Rwenzori ==
The Diocese of Rwenzori was erected when the Diocese of Uganda split in five in 1960; Erica Sabiti became its first diocesan bishop, having served since earlier that year as suffragan bishop (in the Uganda diocese) for the Toro-Bunyoro-Mboga area.

=== Bishops of Rwenzori ===
- 1960–1972 (res.): Erica Sabiti (also Archbishop of Uganda, Rwanda and Burundi from 1966; resigned this See, remaining Archbishop and becoming Bishop of Kampala)
  - 1967–1972: Yonasani Rwakaikara, assistant bishop
- 1972–1981: Yonasani Rwakaikara (translated to Bunyoro-Kitara)
- 1981–2000 (ret.): Eustace Kamanyire (formerly Principal of Bishop Tucker Theological College, Mukono)
- ?–2009: Benezeri Kisembo
- 2009–2010 (d.): Patrick Kyaligonza
- 8 May 2011 – present: Reuben Kisembo

== Diocese of Bunyoro-Kitara ==
Erected from Rwenzori diocese, 1972.

=== Bishops of Bunyoro-Kitara ===
- 1972–1981: Yostus Ruhindi (also Yustasi; consecrated 6 August 1972 at Namirembe Cathedral; translated to North Kigezi)
- 1981–1989: Yonasani Rwakaikara (translated from Rwenzori)
- 1989–2002: Wilson Turumanya (Wilson Nkuna/Nkuuna Turumanya)
- August 2002 – 2016: Nathan Kyamanywa
- 4 December 2016 – present: Sam Kahuma

== Diocese of South Rwenzori ==
Erected from the Diocese of Rwenzori, 1984.

=== Bishops of South Rwenzori ===
- 1984 – 2003: Zebedee Kahangwa-Masereka
- 2003 – 2020: Jackson Nzerebende
- 2020 – present: Nason Baluku

== Diocese of Masindi-Kitara ==
Erected from Bunyoro-Kitara diocese, 2004.

=== Bishop of Masindi-Kitara ===
- 2004–2012: Stanley Ntagali (became Archbishop of Uganda)
- 2012 – present: George Kasangaki (consecrated 25 November 2012, St Matthew's Cathedral, Masindi)

== Diocese of East Rwenzori ==
Erected from the Diocese of Rwenzori, 2009.

=== Bishops of East Rwenzori ===
- 2009–2018: Edward Bamucwanira
- 7 January 2018 – present: George Turyasingura

== Diocese of West Rwenzori ==
A new diocese split from Rwenzori diocese is proposed, and was considered in July 2019.

== See also ==
- Anglican dioceses of Ankole and Kigezi
- Anglican dioceses of Buganda
- Anglican dioceses of Eastern Uganda
- Anglican dioceses of Northern Uganda
- List of Roman Catholic dioceses in Uganda
