= Julius Nina =

Julius Ceasar Nina is an Anglican bishop in Uganda: he has been the Bishop of West Lango since 2019. He was previously the Archdeacon of Kiryandongo Archdeaconry in Masindi-Kitara Diocese.

== Early life and education ==
Born on November 29th 1968 at Ayer-Tekidi Village, Kole District holds a Bachelor of Divinity degree from Uganda Christian University and has received additional training in financial management from CORAT-Africa in Nairobi.

He was born again on 15th September 1985 during a service in which the preacher was preaching on Matthew 7.13: “Go in through the narrow gate because the gate to hell is wide and the road that leads to it is easy and there are many who travel through it.”

The preacher explained that salvation is like the ant who packs too much on his back; he can't crawl back into his small hole and dies outside of it. He realized then that the narrow way to salvation was only through Jesus, who is the way, the truth and the life. (John 10.10)

== Ecclesiastical career ==
Venerable Nina served as the Diocesan Secretary and Treasurer of Masindi-Kitara Diocese, diocesan treasurer and Education Secretary of Bunyoro-Kitara Diocese. He served as the Archdeacon of Kiryandongo Archdeaconry in Masindi-Kitara Diocese. Nina was elected bishop of West Lango Diocese on Tuesday 27th August 2029 by the House of Bishops of the Church of Uganda that sat at the Namirembe Guest House, succeeding the Rt. Rev. Alfred Acur the 1st Bishop of West Lango Diocese. The Archbishop of the Church of Uganda then, the Most Rev Stanley Ntagali on Sunday consecrated and enthroned Rt Rev Julius Ceaser Nina on December 15th 2019 at St. Peter's Cathedral, Aduku ceremonial grounds Township in Kwania District.

== Marriage ==
Bishop Nina married mama Janet Nina and had four children.
