= Micheal Lubowa =

Micheal Lubowa is an Anglican bishop in Uganda who serves as the Bishop of Central Buganda Diocese since his consecration on 29 January 2017.

== Early life and education ==
Lubowa is the son of George Sinabulya, the inaugural Bishop of Central Buganda Diocese. He was born into a devout Anglican family as one of eleven children of George and Edith Sinabulya.

He pursued theological training for ordained ministry at Uganda Christian University, where he earned a Diploma of Theology in 2001. Lubowa later studied in the United Kingdom, earning a Bachelor# of Arts in Applied Theology from Redcliffe College, part of the University of Gloucestershire, in 2007.

== Ordination and ministry ==
Lubowa was ordained a deacon in 2001 in West Buganda Diocese and a priest in 2002 in Central Buganda Diocese. Before his episcopal appointment, he served the church in Mityana Diocese as Archdeacon of Busimbi Archdeaconry, where he oversaw growth by creating a new archdeaconry. He also served as Diocesan Stewardship and Resource Mobiliser, parish priest, and Bishop's Chaplain. Before ordination, he worked in the coffee industry with the Wamala Growers Cooperative Union.

== Bishop of Central Buganda ==
Bishops of the Church of Uganda on 24 August 2016 elected him, and he was consecrated and enthroned at St John's Cathedral, Kasaka, Gomba-Mpigi on 29 January 2017. He succeeded the Rt Rev. Jackson Matovu.

As bishop, Lubowa has focused on social-economic development, including promoting agriculture and community self-sustainability projects in the diocese, and strengthening diocesan structures and clergy welfare.

== Personal life ==
Lubowa is married to Janepher Nankya Lubowa. The couple has four children.

== See also ==
- Church of Uganda
- Central Buganda Diocese
- George Sinabulya
- Uganda Christian University
