= Zebedee Kahangwa-Masereka =

Anglican bishop in Uganda

Zebedee Kahangwa-Masereka (also Masereka Kahangwa) was an Anglican bishop in Uganda: he was Bishop of South Rwenzori from 1984 to 2003.
