= Geresom Ilukor =

Anglican bishop in Uganda

Geresom Ilukor (1935–2013) was an Anglican bishop in Uganda.

Ilukor was educated at Buwalasi Theological College. He was ordained in 1964. He served in the Diocese of Soroti and in 1972 was appointed diocesan registrar and secretary. He was consecrated bishop of Soroti on 11 January 1976 by Janani Luwum, archbishop of Uganda, Rwanda, Burundi and Boga-Zaire, at Namirembe Cathedral.

He died on 30 August 2013.
