= Kosea Odongo =

Ugandan Anglican bishop

Kosea Odongo (born 12 January 1971) is an Anglican bishop who serves in Uganda: he was Bishop of Soroti since 2019.

Odongo was born in Amuria District. He was educated at Uganda Christian University. He worked in the Soroti diocese before being appointed Chaplain to Stanley Ntagali, the Archbishop of Uganda.
