= Lucian Usher-Wilson =

British Anglican bishop

The Right Reverend Lucian Charles Usher-Wilson CBE
- Bishop of Mbale
- Church: Anglican Communion
- Diocese: Diocese of Mbale
- Elected: 1961
- In office: 1961–1964
- Predecessor: (as Bishop on the Upper Nile) Arthur Kitching
- Successor: Erisa Masaba
- Other posts: Bishop on the Upper Nile (1936–1961); Assistant Bishop of Guildford; Honorary Assistant Bishop in the Diocese of Bristol

Orders
- Consecration: 28 October 1936 by Cosmo Lang

Personal details
- Born: 10 January 1903 United Kingdom
- Died: 28 August 1984 (aged 81)
- Denomination: Anglicanism
- Profession: Anglican bishop, missionary, teacher
- Education: Lincoln College, Oxford

Lucian Charles Usher-Wilson CBE (10 January 1903 – 28 August 1984) was a British Anglican bishop who served in Uganda during the mid-20th century and afterwards in England.

Usher-Wilson was educated at Lincoln College, Oxford. He was ordained deacon in 1927 and priest in 1929. He was a teacher at King's College, Budo from 1927 to 1933; and a CMS missionary until his appointment to succeed Arthur Kitching as diocesan Bishop on the Upper Nile in 1936. He was consecrated as a bishop on 28 October 1936, at St Paul's Cathedral by Cosmo Lang, Archbishop of Canterbury.

Under his initiative, the Diocese on the Upper Nile was split in 1961 and Usher-Wilson remained as diocesan bishop of one part, afterwards called the Diocese of Mbale (so he became the first Bishop of Mbale); he resigned that See in 1964 and became Vicar of Churt and an Assistant Bishop of Guildford. On his retirement to Westbury-on-Trym in 1972, he was the longest-serving bishop at the time in any Anglican church; he became an honorary assistant bishop in the Diocese of Bristol. He was appointed a Commander of the Order of the British Empire (CBE).
