= Edison Irigei =

Ugandan Anglican bishop

The Right Reverend Edison Irigei
- Bishop of Kumi
- Church: Church of Uganda
- Diocese: Diocese of Kumi
- In office: 2001–2019
- Predecessor: position established*
- Successor: Michael Okwii Esakan (Bishop)

Orders
- Consecration: 22 July 2001

Personal details
- Born: Mukongoro, Kumi District, Uganda
- Died: 5 December 2023 Soroti Regional Referral Hospital, Uganda
- Denomination: Anglicanism
- Spouse: Jenifer Irigei
- Children: 9

(Thomas) Edison Irigei (died December 5, 2023) was a long serving Anglican bishop who was the first Bishop of Kumi in Uganda from 2001 to 2019.

== Early life and education ==
Irigei was born on December 28, 1954, in Kumi district. He was educated at Akadot Primary School (Primary One to Primary 5) and Mukongoro Rock Primary School (P. 6 to P. 7). Later, he studied at Soroti Secondary School before training as a lay leader at the Diocese Training Centre Ngora.

He later pursued theological studies at Bishop Tucker Theological College, Mukono, earning certificates, a diploma, and eventually a degree.

== Career ==
Irigei served as a lay leader at Akadot Church from 1979 to 1980 and as a hospital chaplain at Ngora Freda Carr Hospital from 1983 to 1987. He was elected bishop of Kumi diocese in 2001 and he reigned for 18 years.

== Personal life ==
Irigei was married to Jenifer Irigei and together they had 9 children.
