= Charles Collins Andaku =

Anglican bishop

- Born: Charles; Arua District
- Education: Makerere University (Bachelors of Education); Uganda Christian University (Master in Divinity)
- Occupation: Bishop
- Title: Bishop

Charles Collins Andaku (born 22 November 1965) is an Anglican bishop in Uganda: he has been the Bishop of Madi and West Nile Sub-region, Uganda since 2017.

== Early life and education ==
Andaku was born on 22 November 1965 in Kibigoro, Arua District, Uganda. His parents were the Rev. Canon Semi Draku and Racheal Draku. He attained a Bachelor of Education from Makerere University in 1999. He graduated with a Masters Degree in Divinity from Uganda Christian University(UCU), Uganda.

== Ordination and career ==
Andaku was ordained as a deacon in 2005 and a priest in 2006. He was a Canon at Emmanuel Cathedral, Mvara prior to his consecration. His is a Madi by tribe and West Nile diocese covers Arua, Moyo, Maracha, Yumbe, Koboko and Adjumani district.

Andaku always encouraged Christians to exercise their rights by participating in national programs like elections.

== See also ==
- Makerere University
- Uganda Christian University
- Emmanuel Cathedral
- Anglican bishops of Uganda
