= Augustine Salimo =

Anglican bishop in Uganda (died 2019)

The Right Reverend Augustine Joe Arapyona Salimo
- Bishop Emeritus of Sebei
- Church: Church of Uganda (Anglican Communion)
- Diocese: Sebei
- In office: 1999–2015
- Successor: Paul Masaba

Personal details
- Born: 1 May 1949 Kapchesombe Parish, Kapchorwa Municipality, Uganda
- Died: 11 May 2019 (aged 70) Kampala, Uganda
- Denomination: Anglican
- Spouse: Zelda Salimo
- Children: 6

Augustine Joe Arapyona Salimo (1 May 1949 – 11 May 2019) was a bishop in the Church of Uganda. he was the inaugural Bishop of Sebei, serving from 1999 to 2015.
