= Anglican dioceses of Eastern Uganda =

Dioceses of the Church of Uganda

The Anglican dioceses of Eastern Uganda are the Anglican presence in (roughly) the Eastern Region, Uganda; they are part of the Church of Uganda. The remaining dioceses of the Church are in the areas of Buganda, of Northern Uganda, of Ankole and Kigezi, and of Rwenzori.

== Diocese of Mbale ==
Erected from the Diocese of Uganda in 1926. In 1954, four archdeaconries were created: West Nile; Lango and Acholi; Teso and Karamoja; and Mbale; there was an Archdeacon of Elgon until that point. By 1953, St Phillip the Evangelist, Ngora was a pro-cathedral of the diocese; it later became a full cathedral of successor dioceses. In preparation for the creation of the independent church province, the diocese was split in three parts in 1961: Teso and Karamoja became Soroti diocese; the Northern Province the Diocese of Northern Uganda; and Mbale, Bugisu and Bukedi remained and was renamed Mbale. When Usher-Wilson was (re)installed as ordinary of the newly-split Mbale diocese, it was at St Andrew's, Mbale.

=== Bishops on the Upper Nile ===
- 1926–1936?: Arthur Kitching
- 1936–1961: Lucian Usher-Wilson (became Mbale)
  - June 1955 – 1961: Keith Russell, assistant bishop (became first diocesan Bishop of Northern Uganda)
  - Stephen Tomusange, assistant bishop (became first diocesan Bishop of Soroti)

=== Bishops of Mbale ===
- 1961 – July 1964 (res.): Lucian Usher-Wilson (became an Assistant Bishop of Guildford)
- 1964–?: Erisa Masaba (previously Archdeacon of Masaba)
- 1976 – April 1979 (d.): John Wasikye
- 1981 – 19 November 1991 (d.): Akisoferi Wesonga
- bef. 2000 – bef. 2008: Samwiri Wabulakha
- 17 August 2008 – present: Patrick Gidudu

== Diocese of Soroti ==
One of the two split from Upper Nile diocese in 1961 was the Diocese of Soroti; her cathedral is St Peter's Cathedral, Soroti.

=== Bishops of Soroti ===
- 1961 – 1965: Stephen Tomusange (previously assistant bishop on the Upper Nile; became Bishop of West Buganda)
- 28 November 1965 – 1976: Asanasio Maraka (previously archdeacon)
- 11 January 1976 – aft. 8 March 2000: Geresom Ilukor (diocese split immediately before; consecrated 11 January 1976, by Janani Luwum, Archbishop of Uganda, Rwanda, Burundi and Boga-Zaire, at Namirembe Cathedral)
- bef. 2005 – bef. 2009: Bernard Obaikol
- 6 September 2009 – 12 July 2018: George Erwau
- 2018–2019: Nicodemus Okille, "caretaker bishop" (retired Bishop of Bukedi)
- June 2019 – present: Kosea Odongo

== Diocese of Busoga ==
Erected from the Diocese of Namirembe in 1972, the mother church is Christ Cathedral, Bugembe (in Jinja District).

=== Bishops of Busoga ===
- 1972–1998 (ret.): Cyprian Bamwoze
- 2002? – January 2016 (ret.): Michael Kyomya
- 20 January 2016 – 2025: Paul Naimanhye
- December 2025-Grace Lubaale

== Diocese of Bukedi ==
Founded from Mbale diocese, 1972; the cathedral is St Peter's Cathedral, Tororo.

=== Bishops of Bukedi ===
- 1972 – 1984: Yona Okoth (became Archbishop of Uganda and Bishop of Kampala)
  - ?–1983: Lucas Gonahasa, assistant bishop (became Assistant Bishop of Kampala)
- 1984 – November 2012: Nicodemus Okille
- 10 February 2013 – present: Sam Egesa

== Diocese of North Mbale ==
Split from the Diocese of Mbale during 1992. The See is at St Matthew's Cathedral, Buhugu in Sironko District.

=== Bishops of North Mbale ===
- 9 August 1992 – 1997: Peter Mudonyi
- 23 March 1997 – August 2003 (res.): Nathan Muwombi
- 10 December 2006 – 16 November 2014: Dan Gimadu
- 16 November 2014 – present: Samuel Gidudu

== Diocese of Sebei ==
Erect from Mbale diocese, 1999. The See is at St Peter's Cathedral, Kokwomurya, Kapchorwa.

=== Bishops of Sebei ===
- 1999–2015 (ret.): Augustine Salimo
- 12 April 2015 – present: Paul Masaba

== Diocese of Kumi ==
From the Diocese of Soroti in 2001. St Philip's Cathedral, Ngora.

=== Bishop of Kumi ===
- 2001 – 2019 (ret.): Edison Irigei
- Charles Okunya was elected bishop 7 November 2019, but that election was overturned by the House of Bishops on 5 February 2020.
- 2019–present (Acting): Charles Odurkami, retired Bishop of Lango

== Diocese of Central Busoga ==
Founded in 2016 from the Busoga diocese; All Saints' Pro-Cathedral, Iganga.

=== Bishops of Central Busoga ===
- 13 November 2016 – present: Patrick Wakula

== Diocese of East Busoga ==
Proposed for split from Busoga.

== See also ==
- Anglican dioceses of Ankole and Kigezi
- Anglican dioceses of Buganda
- Anglican dioceses of Northern Uganda
- Anglican dioceses of Rwenzori
- List of Roman Catholic dioceses in Uganda
