= Erisa Masaba =

Ugandan Anglican bishop

The Right Reverend Erisa Kabiri Masaba MBE
- Bishop of Mbale
- Church: Anglican Church of Uganda
- Province: Church of Uganda
- Diocese: Mbale
- Elected: 1964
- In office: 1964–1975
- Predecessor: Lucian Usher-Wilson
- Successor: John Wasikye
- Previous post: Archdeacon of Mbale (1953–1961)

Orders
- Ordination: 1934

Personal details
- Born: Uganda
- Denomination: Anglicanism
- Profession: Anglican priest, bishop

Erisa Kabiri Masaba, MBE was an Anglican bishop in Uganda.

Masaba was ordained deacon in 1933 and priest in 1934. He served in the Diocese of the Upper Nile. He was a lecturer at Buwalasi Theological College from 1940 to 1943; and a chaplain to the British Armed Forces from 1943 to 1948. He was archdeacon of Mbale from 1953 to 1961 and Bishop of Mbale from 1964 to 1975 (he was also dean).
