= Benoni Ogwal =

Anglican bishop

Benoni Y. Ogwal-Abwang was an Anglican bishop in Uganda: he was Bishop of Northern Uganda from 1974 to 1989.

Ogwal-Abwang was born in 1942. He was educated at the University of Western Ontario and Uganda Christian University. He was ordained in 1969. After a curacy in Gulu, he was Assistant Provincial Secretary of the Church of Uganda until his consecration as bishop.
