= George Turyasingura =

The Right Reverend George Turyasingura
- Bishop of East Rwenzori
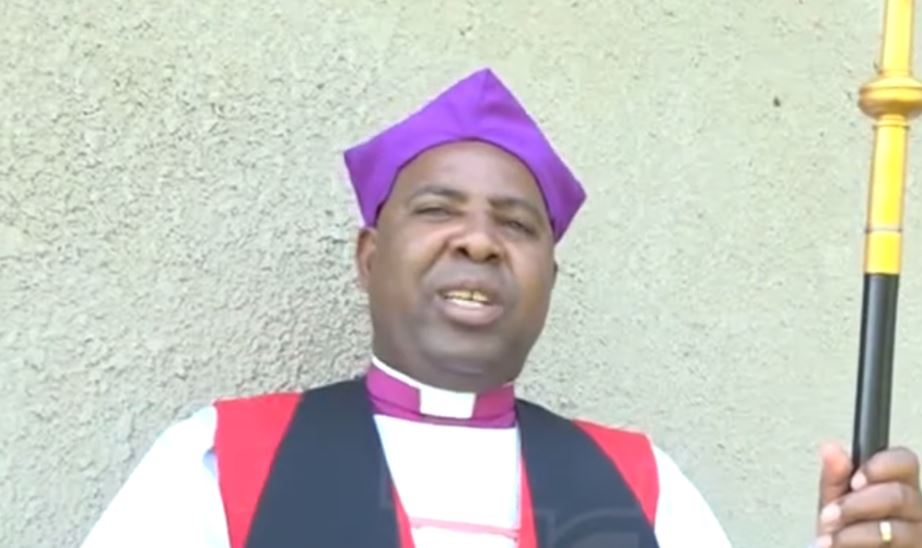
- Church: Church of Uganda
- Diocese: East Rwenzori
- In office: 2018–present
- Predecessor: Edward Bamucwanira

Orders
- Ordination: 1998
- Consecration: 7 January 2018

Personal details
- Born: 1968 (age 57–58) Kabale District, Uganda
- Education: Uganda Christian University

George Turyasingura (born 1968) is an Anglican bishop in Uganda: he has been Bishop of East Rwenzori since 2018.

== Early life and education ==
Turyasingura was born in 1968 in Nyamucengere, Kabale District. He was educated at Rwengobe School and Uganda Christian University.He got saved on the 07th, July 1989

== Ecclesiastical career ==
He was ordained in 1998. After a curacy at Kyabenda he has served as Parish Priest of Kabuga; Sub Dean at St. Stephen's Cathedral, Kamwenge; and as Diocesan Secretary of East Rwenzori Diocese.The House of Bishops elected George Turyasingura as 2nd Bishop of East Ruwenzori on July 11, 2017, at Lweza Training and Conference Centre Turyasingura was consecrated on 7 January 2018. His installation ceremony was presided over by the Archbishop of the Church of Uganda then, Stanley Ntangali, at St. Steven's Cathedral in Kamwenge. Bishop George Turyasingura replaced Bishop Edward Bamucwanira who had been bishop since 2009 when East Rwenzori Diocese was curved from Rwenzori Diocese.

== Marriage ==
George Turyasingura married Juliet Turyasingura and God blessed them with 6 Children.

== See also ==
- Amos Betungura
- Sheldon Mwesigwa
- Kosiya Shalita
