= George Kasangaki =

Ugandan Anglican bishop (born 1960)

George William Asiimwe Kasangaki (born 4 August 1960) is an Anglican bishop in Uganda; he has been Bishop of Masindi-Kitara since 2012.

== Early life and education ==
Kasangaki was born on 4 August 1960 to Jackson Kasangaki and Constance Kabahuma Nyabalega and he was their only child as a couple.

He was educated at Duhaga Secondary school, the University of Gloucestershire and Uganda Christian University. In 1980, he went for studies in ordained ministry at Bishop Tucker School of Divinity on scholarship from the diocese.

== Career ==
He has served the church as a parish priest; a Chaplain; a field worker with LIFE Ministry, and as Diocesan Secretary of Bunyoro-Kitara Diocese then Masindi-Kitara Diocese.
