= Remelia Ringtho =

Anglican bishop in Uganda (1929–2021)

- Born: 21 October 1929
- Died: 1 April 2021 (aged 91)
- Citizenship: Ugandan
- Education: Buwalasi Theological College
- Occupation: Anglican Bishop

Remelia Ringtho (21 October 1929 – 1 April 2021) was an Anglican bishop in Uganda.

== Early life and education ==
Ringtho was educated at Buwalasi Theological College and ordained in 1963. He served in the Diocese of Northern Uganda. He was consecrated an Assistant Bishop of Madi- West Nile in 1976, and its Diocesan in 1977 where he took over Bishop Wani. He retired in 1987 and was succeeded by Bishop Ephraim Adrale. He thereafter resided at his place in Warri, Zombo District. He died on 1 April 2021 at Kalwa Hospital in Arua.

== Death ==
He died on 1 April 2021 at 92 years at Kuluva Hospital in Arua.

== See also ==
- Anglican dioceses of Northern Uganda
- Ephraim Adrale
- James Nasak
