= Nathan Muwombi =

Ugandan Anglican bishop

The Right Reverend Nathan N. Muwombi
- Bishop of North Mbale
- Church: Anglican Church of Uganda
- Diocese: North Mbale
- In office: 23 March 1997 – August 2003
- Predecessor: Peter Mudonyi
- Successor: Daniel Gimadu

Personal details
- Died: 28 June 2022
- Denomination: Anglicanism
- Occupation: Anglican bishop

Nathan N. Muwombi was an Anglican bishop in Uganda; he was the Bishop of North Mbale from 1997 to 2003.
