= Cyprian Bamwoze =

Ugandan Anglican bishop

Cyprian Kikuni Bamwoze (born May 15, 1934) was the inaugural Bishop of Busoga in Uganda.

Bamwoze was educated at the Uganda Christian University in Mukono. He was ordained in 1964.

== Early life and education ==
Bamwoze was born on 15th May 1934 to Birusaani Munhanhanfu and Budestiana Mukodha of Kitayundhwa sub-county in Kamuli District. He went to Naminage Primary school in 1944 and later Kamuli Junior school before joining Busoga College Mwiri in 1955.

In 1960, Bamwoze enrolled for a religious education course in Mukono. He later went to the United Kingdom to study theology and was ordained priest in 1963. Bamwoze also possessed a bachelor's degree in Religious education and Philosophy which he got from Makerere University in 1967.

== Career ==
He served in the Diocese of Namirembe until 1972 until his appointment as bishop. Bamwoze was consecrated on August, 06th 1972 and enthroned as first Bishop of Busoga Anglican diocese on August 13th 1972. Bamwoze retired in 1998 after being at the helm of the Diocese for 26 years and was succeeded by Michael Kyomya.

== Personal life ==
Bamwoze was originally married to Beatrice Bamwoze with whom he had 6 children. Beatrice died in 1986 and Bamwoze got remarried to Naome Bamwoze who also died in 2016.

== Controversies ==
On September 22,1992, Christians in Busoga Diocese held a meeting in which they passed a vote of no confidence in Bamwoze's administration. Bamwoze was accused of financial mismanagement and poor administration.

However, Bamwoze was also hailed for being pro development in the Busoga region during this tenure as bishop.

== Death ==
He died on 11 February 2019 after succumbing to Leukemia at the Uganda Cancer institute.
