= Bwindi Community Hospital =

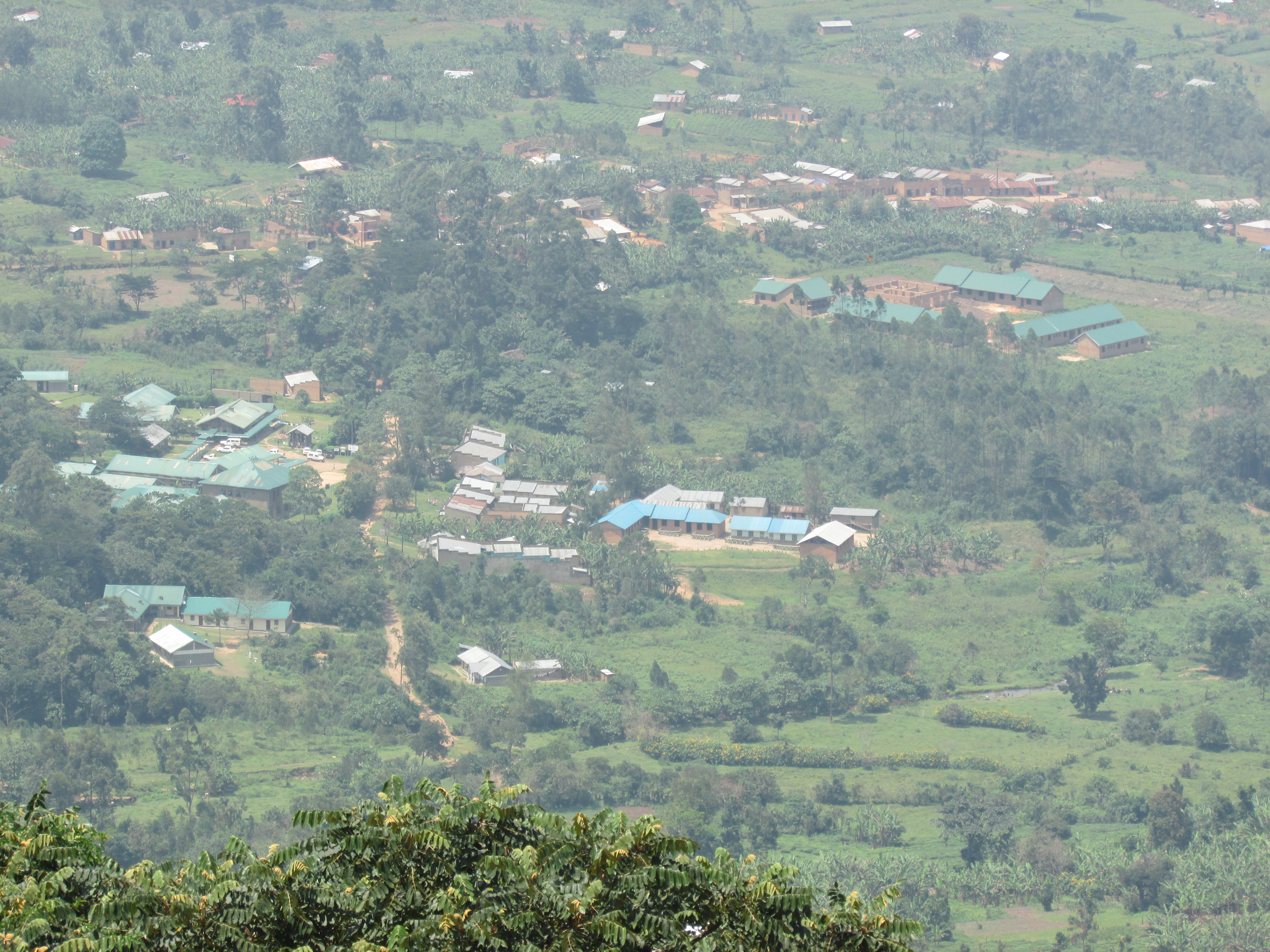
- A view of the hospital from a nearby hill

- Location within Uganda

Geography
- Location: Bwindi, Kanungu District, Western Region, Uganda
- Coordinates: 00°58′07″S 29°37′01″E

Organisation
- Type: General
- Patron: Scott and Carol Kellermann

History
- Opened: 2003

Links
- Website: www.bwindihospital.com
- Lists: Hospitals in Uganda

Bwindi Community Hospital was founded in 2003 by Scott and Carol Kellermann. It began as an outreach clinic under a tree, and has grown into a 155-bed hospital providing health care and health education services to a population of over 100,000 people in Uganda. The hospital began with a special mission to help the Twa or Batwa pygmies who were displaced from the Bwindi Impenetrable Forest after it was made a national park in 1991. Since leaving the forest many Batwa have lived in extreme poverty and are affected by the health issues that poverty brings.

While the hospital was started particularly to provide health care to the Twa, it quickly found itself treating all people living in the area. The hospital serves the population in three sub-counties of Kayonza, Mpungu and Kanyantorogo in Kanungu District.

There are few other decent health services in this extremely remote area and people sometimes walk for more than a day to get to the hospital. Its status was upgraded from health centre to hospital in 2008 after a new operating theater was built.

== The Kellermanns ==
Batwa pygmies inhabited the Bwindi Impenetrable Forest for thousands of years, but became conservation refugees largely as a result of efforts to protect endangered mountain gorillas. Some people had to walk 20 kilometres to get to the nearest health centre to receive treatment for their health problems. When Scott and Carol Kellermann began their work in Bwindi in 2001, they came as missionaries to help the Batwa pygmies. Out of the population of 100,000 people in the Bwindi area, around 800 are Batwa.

== Hospital statistics ==
Monthly averages;

- Out Patient Department attendance 3,000
- Deliveries 150
- Surgery (major operations) 60
- Admissions on adult and children's ward 300
- HIV testing 845
- eQuality subscription 30,000
- 100% of the babies’ borne of HIV positive mothers that enrolled in the hospital's prevention from mother to Child Treatment (PMTCT) before delivery were discharged HIV free.
- 97% of patients with TB completed their treatment successfully.

== Staff demographics ==
Bwindi Community Hospital is a Church of Uganda (Anglican) Hospital under the Diocese of Kinkiizi. It is staffed by a team of 150. These include: doctors, nurses, midwives, other health workers and support staff. 70% of the employees are from within the hospital's catchment area and 30% are from other parts of Uganda.

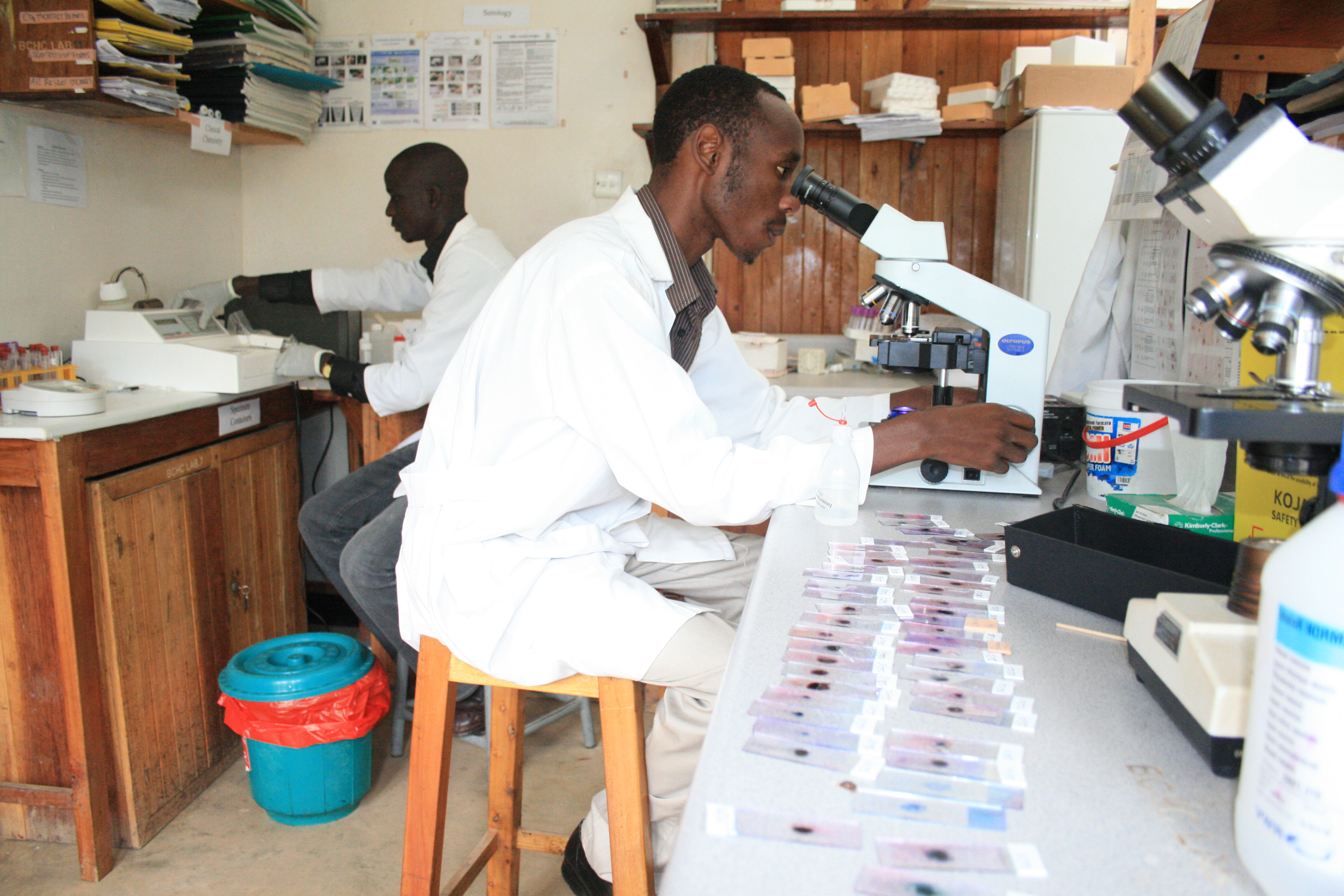
The lab technicians test for everything, including HIV and Tuberculous.

== The community ==
Bwindi Community Hospital cares for more than 100,000 people living in the South Western corner of Uganda. The hospital is located twelve hours drive, on poor roads, from Kampala, the capital, two kilometres from the Eastern border of the Congo, and one kilometre from Bwindi Impenetrable Forest. Most of the people here are farmers or herders who live without running water and electricity, many walk for hours daily to collect water and firewood, and most families survive on less than $1 a day.

Malaria has always been the biggest killer in the Bwindi area, and is easily preventable simply by sleeping under a mosquito net. Many people still suffer from diarrhea because they don't know enough about how to access clean water, and families go hungry because they don't have the knowledge and skills to be able to grow and prepare a balanced diet. Many children with malnutrition and adults with tuberculosis go undiagnosed in the community because of a lack of screening.

=== The Twa ===
The life expectancy is 28 for the Twa versus 53 for the average Ugandan. The Batwa are poorer, and have more limited access to health care. In the past Batwa women would be beaten while in labour by health workers to stop them from crying, or even denied health care altogether when they tried to take their sick children to health facilities.

Only one out of every fourteen Batwa women is on family planning compared with one out of four of their Bakiga neighbours. Batwa children are more likely to die, more likely to be malnourished, are less likely to go to school, and are less likely to sleep under a mosquito net than the rest of society.

Byumba Health Centre II opened in June 2009 on the edge of a Batwa settlement. It employs three Batwa and three Bakiga workers. The nursing team looks after more than 500 patients a month. The Byumba team teaches in local schools and villages, and makes a special effort to reach out to the Batwa pygmies with family planning, HIV testing, pregnancy care, immunization, and education about clean water and prevention of malaria.

Village health promoters from Bwindi travel to other Batwa settlements in the area every Friday for teaching, the sale of mosquito nets, and treatment of common health problems. The hospital is located within walking distance of two other Batwa communities. Batwa have always received free health care at the hospital, and the hospital is working together with partners, including the Batwa Development Program, in the area to encourage the Batwa to generate income that enables them to make a contribution to the cost of their care.

== Pediatric care ==
The child mortality rate of Twa is 38% for children under five compared with 18% in the general Ugandan population.

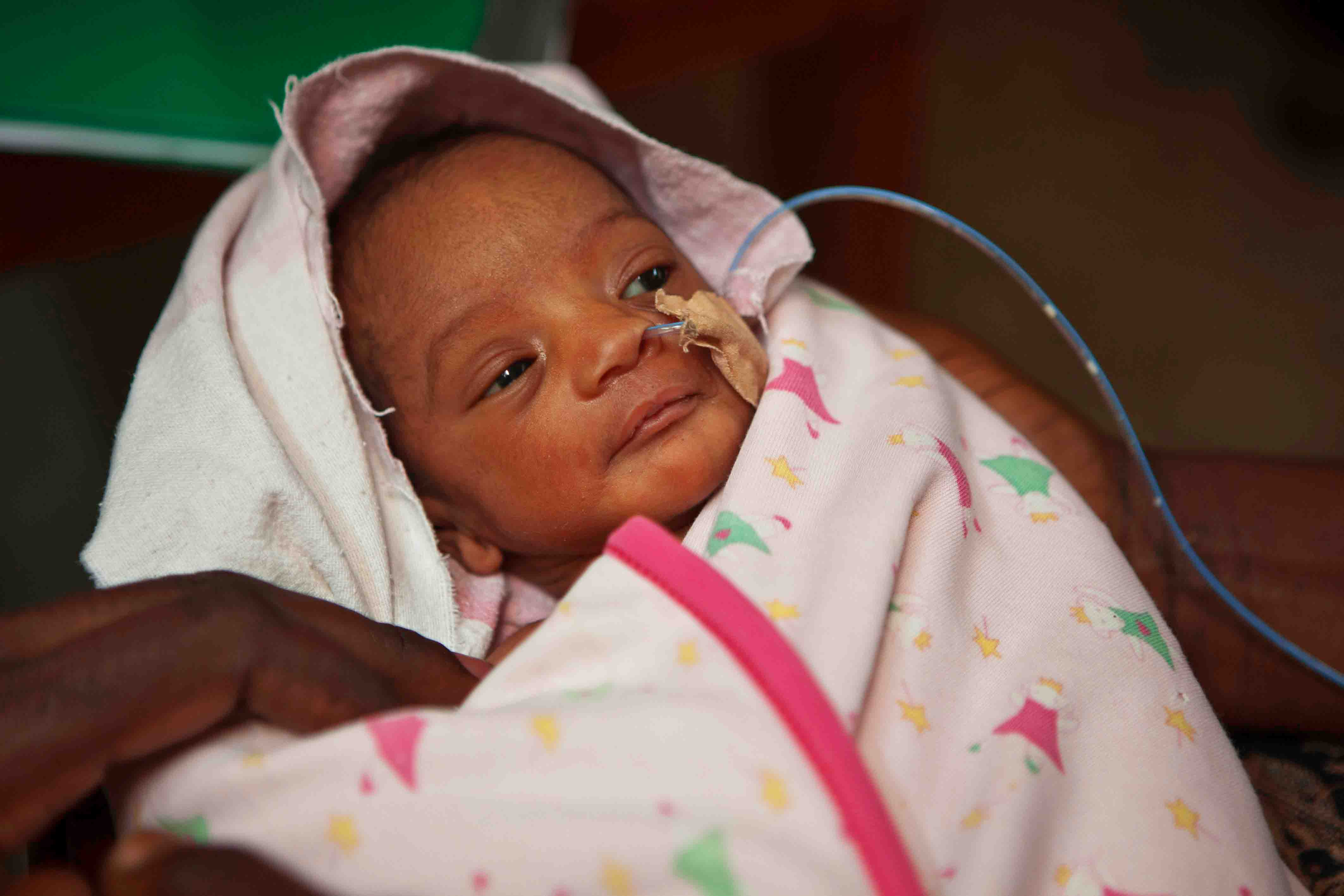
The only Neo-natal unit in the district helps infants survive.

With this in mind the hospital has developed a specialist unit for sick newborn babies and children. The neonatal unit is the only unit for a population of 300,000 people in the whole district of Kanungu. 91.1% of newborn babies admitted to the neonatal unit survive.

Each month more than 500 children visit the Outpatient department and more than 100 are admitted to the ward. The leading health problems are respiratory infections, malaria, diarrheal diseases and malnutrition. On average 15 children are admitted every month with malnutrition. It costs a minimum of 540,000 UGX ($245) to give a full package of health care to every malnourished child on the ward.

Outside the ward is a children's play area, a kitchen and a demonstration garden where mothers (and occasionally fathers) can learn skills about how to grow and cook a balanced diet for their children. The ward staff organizes practical cooking sessions with the mothers of the admitted children every week. These are always preceded by singing and dancing. Children who were previously admitted with severe malnutrition are followed-up with to see if their nutritional status is improving.

Specialist clinics are held each week for children with long-term diseases. Collaborations with health organizations like Organization Useful Rehabilitation Service (OURS) and Comprehensive Rehabilitation Services in Uganda (CoRSU) offer additional services for children such as physical rehabilitation and repair of congenital defects.

Bwindi's child health services get support from Sustain for Life, a charity in the UK and TOUCH Uganda in the United States but there is a lot more to be done. Adding the money spent on staff, drugs, electricity and other supplies it costs about $30 a day to keep a child in Hospital. The average family in Bwindi lives on about $1 a day and has seven children. They do contribute a small amount, but the local community cannot afford the full costs of care. The average child with malnutrition stays for more than two weeks, and the total cost of providing all of the child health services is $130,000 a year.

== Outreach programs ==
Bwindi Community Hospital is much more than just a hospital where sick people stay to receive treatment. The Community Health and Batwa team together with the Village health teams make up a large part of the services provided by the hospital. They:

- Teach in every school in the area at least once a term, and screen every child for dental problems.
- Take education and treatment to remote Batwa pygmy settlements each week.
- Immunize children in villages where there are no other services available.
- Bring health discussions directly into every household through weekly radio shows.
- Have trained volunteer health workers, called Village Health Promoters (VHP) in every village.
- Take HIV testing and treatment to places not previously receiving services.
- Enable women to get birth control without having to come to Hospital.

Every two years a Household Survey of all homes in the Bwindi area is conducted to measure the progress of the Community Health interventions led by the hospital. To see the latest survey click here

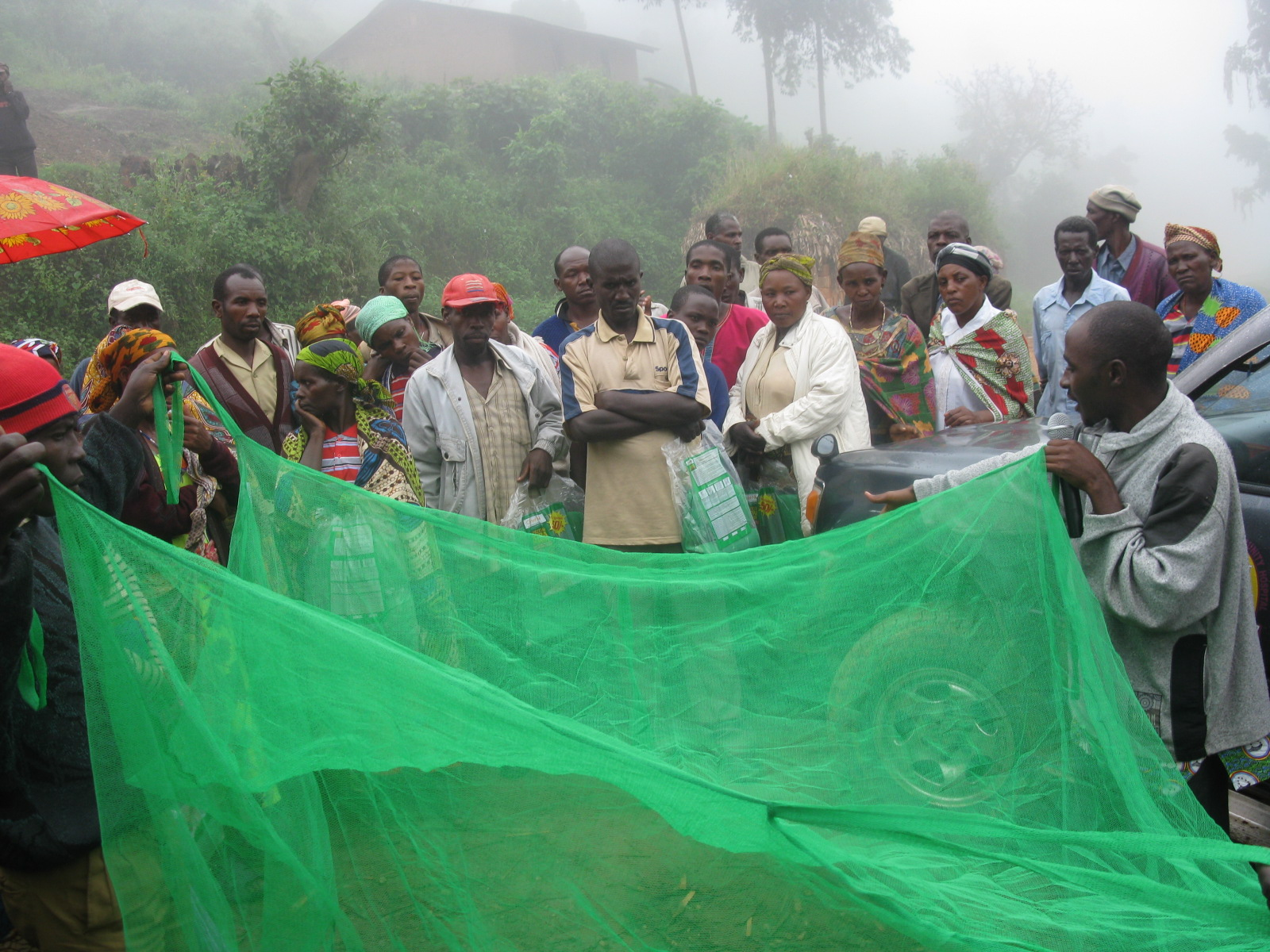
Malaria still kills and it is important to spread the word about the use of mosquito nets.

=== HIV ===
Bwindi Community Hospital sends its HIV team into the surrounding area three days each week for a mobile testing and treatment clinic. The HIV team takes a portable CD4 machine with them on outreach clinics, which counts the cells that the HIV virus attacks. With this machine the team has results within eight minutes of taking a blood sample.

More than two hundred local people living with HIV have joined one of the hospital's patient support groups, which meet in different parts of the Bwindi area each month. A drama group has been started which tours schools and churches, delivering a delightfully funny and poignant play about a man whose life is changed when he finds out he is HIV positive and accesses treatment.

Some members of the patient support group have also started teaching in schools. They have been trained by Bwindi Community Hospital in basic teaching methods, and run lessons about HIV prevention and stigma-reduction in every classroom in the Bwindi area. Other members have been lucky enough to receive young female goats that they take home and rear, returning the first female offspring to the group so that another person can benefit.

More than 1,000 people test for HIV each month. Every two years the hospital conducts a community survey that provides information about which parts of the Bwindi area have the largest number of untested people. Counselors and laboratory staff visit these places in order to give all people an opportunity to know their HIV status.

=== Family planning ===
Uganda has one of the highest fertility rates in the world at seven children per woman, and has the youngest population on the planet with a median age of less than fifteen. Large families trap people in poverty with not enough money for food, schooling and health care for their children. High fertility rates are dangerous for women, and make it hard for them to escape traditional childbearing roles. A 3% annual population growth rate is unsustainable for the environment, and leaves younger generations without enough water or land for cultivation.

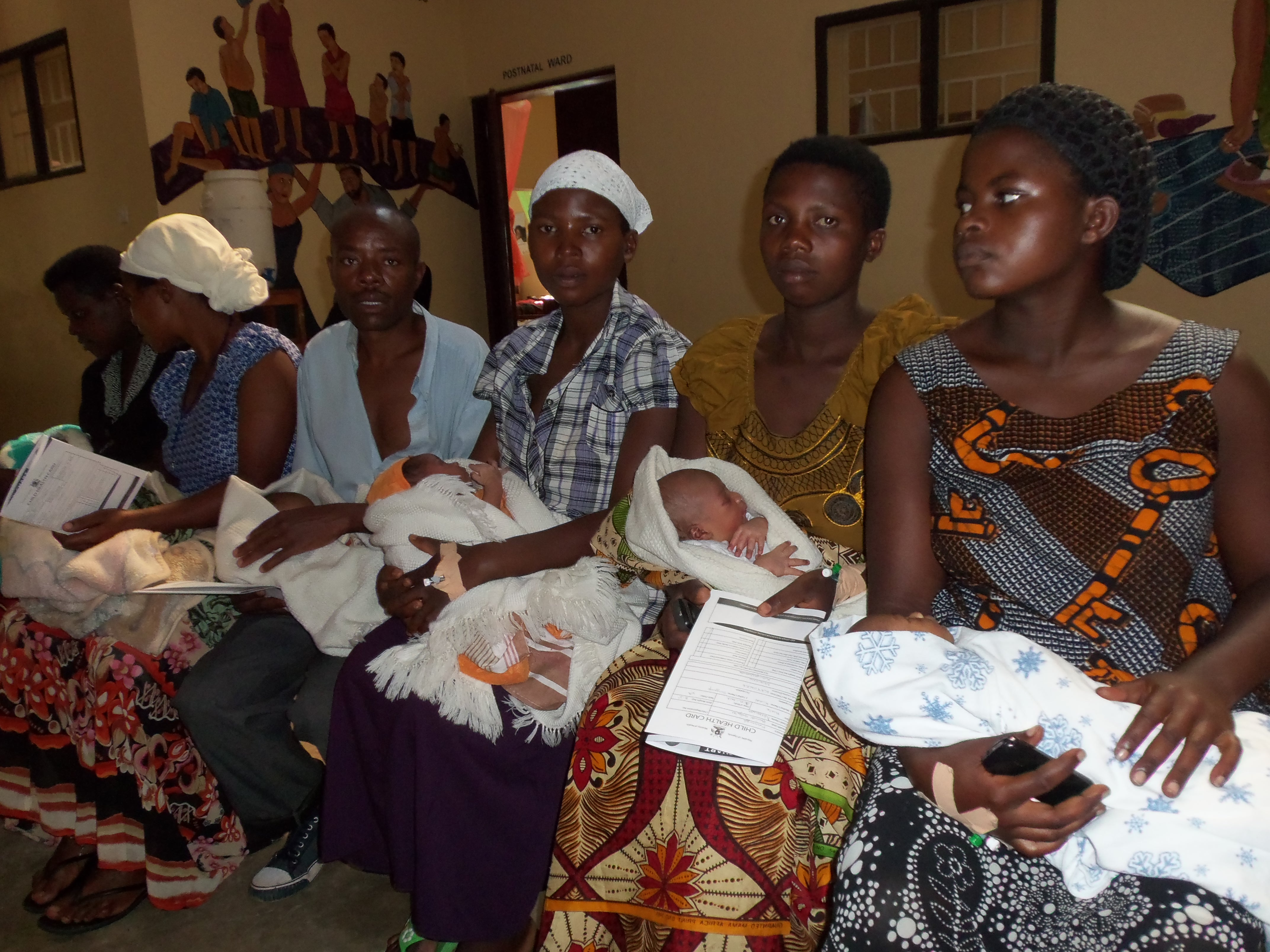
Parents get education in nutrition, family planning, and general care.

Three years ago very few couples in the Bwindi area were accessing family planning (birth control). Now the contraceptive prevalence rate (proportion of women of child-bearing age using some form of contraception) is 28%. The target is 40%.

Bwindi Community Hospital, in partnership with Family Health International, has trained 40 village health workers to be able to give contraceptive pills and injections. Now more than 500 women a month access their contraception through this network. The Hospital integrates family planning into HIV and postnatal clinics, and runs Family Planning Camps where hospital staff inserts an implant that lasts for five years.

Discussions on family planning occur on the local radio, in villages, and in trading centres, particularly with the men of the area who are the real decision makers and often those who are most opposed to reducing family sizes.

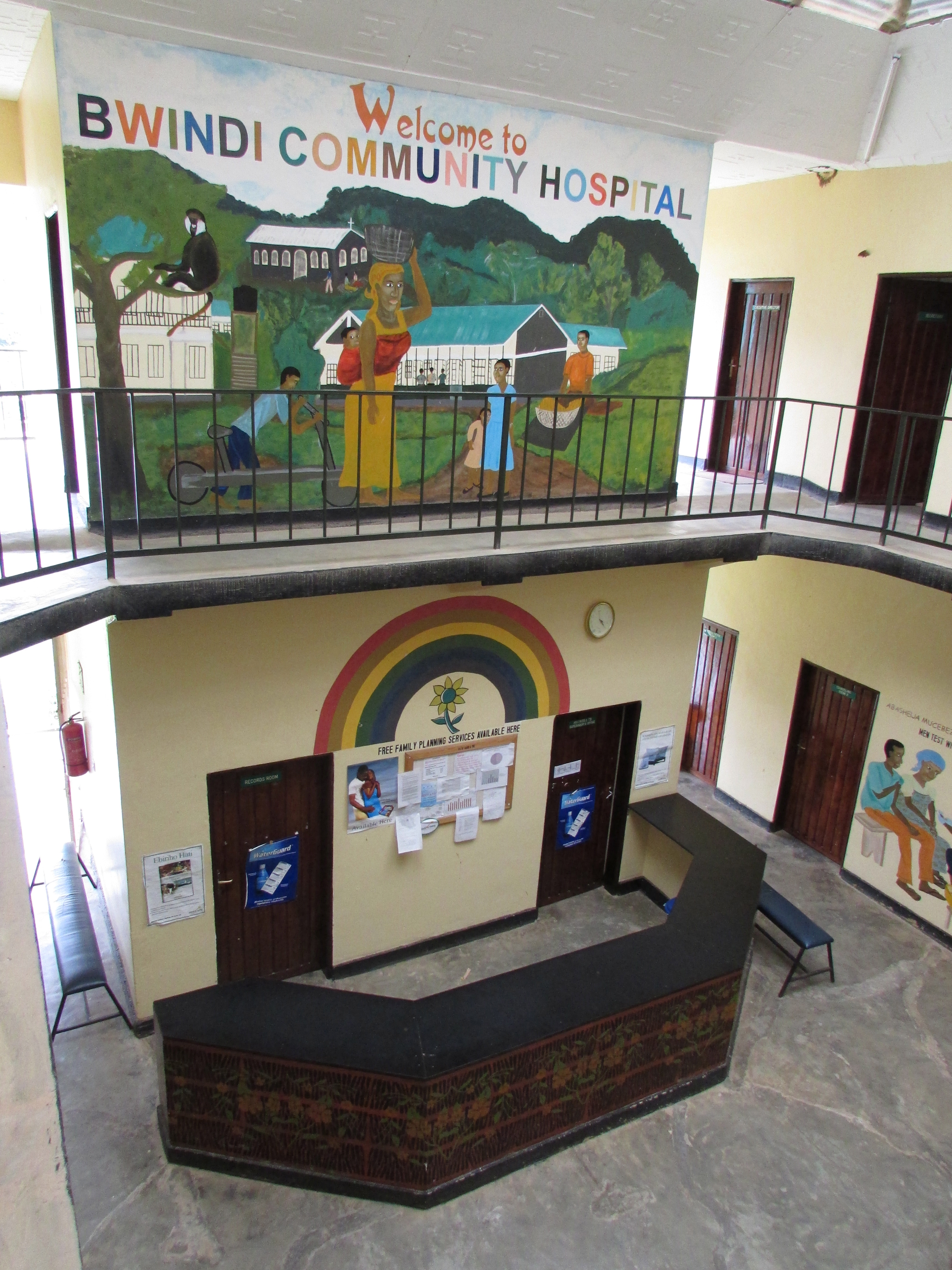
This is the lobby in the administration building. It is the only two-story building in the community.

None of the patients are charged, so Bwindi Community Hospital relies entirely on donations. The hospital is supplied with drugs from the Government of Uganda but the salaries of the staff, transport costs, and all of the training and support given to the village health workers rely on donations. The hospital has written a four-year strategic plan describing how to reach the target of 40% contraceptive prevalence, a goal that will require about $20,000 per year.

=== Waiting mothers' hostel ===
In Uganda, many rural women give birth at home with the help of traditional birth attendants, barriers to maternal services at hospitals or clinics are due to education, wealth, distance, lack of cultural safety and transportation.

The Waiting Mother's Hostel was established so that expectant mothers could come to the hospital early to wait for their due dates. Given the remote location and little reliable means of transport, it is usually hard for a mother to come when she is in labour. The hostel was donated by the Australian embassy. While mothers at the hostel are waiting for their delivery, health education programming is provided daily.

=== Village Health Teams ===
Poor roads and lack of public transportation mean that many people cannot reach the hospital. Village health promoters (VHP) work together with Bwindi Community Hospital to reach the people who cannot come to the hospital. This is a pioneering project where knowledge and skills about health are shared with every village and household in the Bwindi area. One of two hundred VHP's trained by Bwindi Community Hospital, are easily recognizable by their green T-shirts and the positive attitude towards helping the community. Two or three days each month the VHP's attend workshops led by the hospital to learn about different aspects of health, and takes the knowledge back to villages. Through the Community Health Team at the hospital, a strong linkage exists between the hospital and the community. A total of 500 Village Health Teams (VHTS) and Village Health Promoters help to reach 101 villages with health promotion messages.

To prevent malnutrition they teach every household how to grow and cook a balanced diet, giving them a list of all the children in their village and teaching them to check them every three months for signs of malnutrition. The VHP refer children and other community members to the Hospital if necessary.

== Health insurance scheme ==
eQuality is a community health membership scheme that was launched in March 2010 as a mechanism to help people of the Bwindi area have access to equitable, quality, and sustainable health care services affordable to all. BCH works in close relationship with the community through Bataka groups to implement eQuality currently in the three sub counties of Kayonza, Mpungu and Kanyantorogo, although due to high demand, a few Bataka groups in Kiruhura and Kanungu town council were included last year.

The scheme, which is in its third year of operation, has had its membership grow to 24,323 as of June 1, 2012. This is 40% of the target population of 60,000 people living in the three sub counties of Kayonza, Mpungu, and Kanyantorogo.

In the 80's the country was experiencing close to 25% percent prevalence in AIDS infections and by the 90's, due to a lack of anti-retrovirals, population reduction due to the AIDS epidemic was astounding. People who traveled to Uganda in the 90's remember the “boom” in casket making. At the village level a structure and community process was created to address the large number of deaths. In the southwest region burial leaders were selected and they would coordinate the burial, donations, and assistance to the families. Their motto for this process was Bataka Twizikye, “Let us bury ourselves.”

As the idea for a community health care scheme began to take root the hospital searched for a motto. The very way that health insurance works is that the whole community “pools” their money to care for each other. When they need to go to the hospital they have paid their 6,000 UGX (US$3) per person per year. The pooled money is available to pay for their treatment. The natural motto then became built upon the earlier burial phrase, it became, Bataka Twetambire, “Let us heal ourselves.”

== Future projects ==
A satellite clinic in Kanyashogyi has been opened and a satellite clinic in Kanyantorogo is planned for 2013.

A nursing school is being built next to the hospital to further facilitate the training of local people in the skills and knowledge of nursing. The hope is to both provide a school and a training place for any interested student. Planned to open mid-2013.

== Awards ==
2011 Health Impact Award-Stars Foundation

Uganda Protestant Medical Bureau (UPMB)

== Support ==
- 45% of funding comes from Individual donors
- 6% from Government
- 49% from Organizations/Charities/Trusts
