= Nelson Onono-Onweng =

Anglican bishop in Uganda

Nelson Onono-Onweng was an Anglican bishop in Uganda. He was the Bishop of Northern Uganda until his retirement in 2009.
