= Howell Davies (bishop) =

Ugandan Anglican bishop (1927–2009)

Howell Haydn Davies (1927–2009) was an Anglican bishop in Uganda: he was Bishop of Karamoja from 1981 to 1987.

After National Service in the RAF, Davies trained as an architect. Davies was ordained deacon in 1959 and priest in 1960. After a curacy at St Peter's Church in Hereford, he served as a missionary in Kenya from 1961 to 1979. He was Archdeacon of Maseno from 1971 to 1974; and Provost of Nairobi from 1974 to 1979. He was Vicar of St Peter's, Woking from 1979 to 1981 when he went out to serve in Uganda. When he returned in 1987 he was Vicar of St Jude, Wolverhampton. He was an Associate of the Royal Institute of British Architects (ARIBA). His son, Bishop Tim Davies, serves as Bishop to the Anglican Mission in England.
