= Ephraim Adrale =

Anglican bishop in Uganda

Bishop Ephraim Adrale
- Born: Ephraim Adrale; Arua, West Nile
- Died: 1990; Kampala
- Education: Makerere University
- Occupation: Teacher
- Years active: 1975—1990
- Known for: Clerical work, Refugee work
- Title: Bishop in Church of Uganda
- Spouse: Salome Munduru

Ephraim Adrale was an Anglican bishop in Uganda.

== Early life and education ==
Adrale was educated at Makerere University and ordained in 1975. He became Bishop of Madi-West Nile when he took over Bishop Remelia Ringtho in 1988 and served for two years. He was a son of Matayo Ewada, a hunter. He went ahead to become a teacher, rising to be the headteacher of Anyavu Primary School.

He later enrolled in studies to become a clergy member and upon completion started catechism work and was ordained as a Reverend. He rose through the ranks to become Bishop of Madi-West Nile and served in the Archbishop's office at Namirembe as Refugee Secretary in the province of the Church of Uganda. In 1990, he died after a short illness and was survived by his wife Salome Munduru and their eight children.

== See also ==
- James Nasak
- Remelia Ringtho
- Anglican dioceses of Northern Uganda
