= Emmanuel Cathedral =

- Emmanuel Cathedral
- 29.8575°S 31.0157°E
- Location: Durban
- Country: South Africa
- Denomination: Roman Catholic Church

The Emmanuel Cathedral or simply Cathedral of Durban, is the name given to the Catholic Church which is located at 48 Cathedral Road in the heart of the city of Durban in KwaZulu-Natal in South Africa.

It is a religious building that follows the Roman or Latin rite and functions as the headquarters of the Metropolitan Archdiocese of Durban (Archidioecesis Durbaniana) which was created in 1951 with the bull "Suprema Nobis" of Pope Pius XII.

It was built to replace an old church dedicated to Saint Joseph who had been in use since 1881. The first stone was laid by Bishop Charles Jolivet in January 1902 and the temple was officially dedicated in November 1904. Some parts of the old church were joined to the Emmanuel Cathedral. Beside the cathedral is the Juma Masjid Mosque. Across the road from the cathedral is the Victoria Street Market.

== See also ==
- Roman Catholicism in South Africa
- Roman Catholic Archdiocese of Durban
