= Paul Naimanhye =

Ugandan Anglican bishop

Paul Moses Samson Naimanhye
- Bishop of Busoga
- Church: Anglican Church of Uganda
- Diocese: Busoga
- Appointed: 2016
- Predecessor: Michael Kyomya

Orders
- Consecration: 24 January 2016

Personal details
- Born: 24 December 1960 (age 65)
- Denomination: Anglican
- Spouse: Florence Lydia Naimanhye
- Children: 3
- Education: Uganda Christian University

Paul Moses Samson Naimanhye (born 24 December 1960) is an Anglican bishop in Uganda: since 2016 he has been the Bishop of Busoga after replacing Michael Kyomya. He was consecrated on 24 January 2016.

Naimanhye was educated at Uganda Christian University where he obtained a bachelor's degree in divinity. His last post before becoming a bishop was as Dean of Christ's Cathedral, Bugembe.

== Achievements ==
Naimanhye served as Bishop of Busoga Diocese for nine years. During his tenure, he worked with church leaders on diocesan administration and pastoral outreach, including the appointment of new canons within the diocese.

He also publicly raised concerns on social and employment issues, including appeals to the Ugandan government regarding remuneration for teachers and other civil servants.

== Personal life ==
Naimanhye is married to Florence Lydia Naimanhye with whom he has 3 children.

== See also ==
- Anglican Church of Uganda
- Diocese of Busoga
