= Stephen Tomusange =

Ugandan Anglican bishop

The Right Reverend Stephen Salonga Tomusange
- Anglican Bishop
- Church: Church of Uganda
- Diocese: Diocese of the Upper Nile; Diocese of Soroti; Diocese of West Buganda
- In office: Assistant Bishop (Upper Nile): 1952–1961; Bishop of Soroti: 1961–1965; Bishop of West Buganda: 1965–1974
- Previous post: Archdeacon of Teso (from 1959)

Orders
- Ordination: Deacon: 1936; Priest: 1938

Personal details
- Denomination: Anglicanism
- Education: King's College Budo; Buwalasi Theological College

Stephen Salonga Tomusange was an Anglican bishop who served in Uganda during the second half of the 20th century.

He was educated at King's College Budo and Buwalasi Theological College. He was ordained deacon in 1936 and priest in 1938. He served in the Diocese of the Upper Nile and was its Assistant Bishop from 1952 to 1961 (he was also Archdeacon of Teso from 1959). He was translated to Soroti in 1961; and again to West Buganda in 1965 (where he was also Dean). Tomusange retired in 1974.

== See also ==
- Yonah Katoneene
- William Magambo
