= Jackson Nzerebende =

Ugandan Anglican bishop (born 1957)

Jackson Nzerebende Tembo (born 1957 in Kasese District) is an Anglican bishop in the Uganda: He was Bishop of South Rwenzori from 2003 to 2020. Before consecration to the episcopate, he served in several capacities as a church lay reader and priest within the diocese.
