= Keith Russell (bishop) =

British Anglican bishop

The Right Reverend Keith Russell
- Bishop of Northern Uganda
- Church: Anglican Church
- Diocese: Northern Uganda
- In office: 1961–1964
- Predecessor: (not listed)*
- Successor: Silvanus Wani
- Other posts: Assistant Bishop on the Upper Nile (1955–1960); Assistant Bishop of Rochester (after 1965)

Personal details
- Born: John Keith Russell; 14 August 1916 United Kingdom
- Died: 1 September 1979 (aged 63)
- Denomination: Anglican
- Occupation: Anglican bishop, educator
- Education: Shrewsbury School; Christ’s College, Cambridge; Ridley Hall, Cambridge

(John) Keith Russell (14 August 1916 – 1 September 1979) was a British Anglican bishop in Uganda.

Russell was educated at Shrewsbury School; Christ's College, Cambridge; and Ridley Hall, Cambridge. He was ordained deacon in 1940 and priest in 1941. After a curacy in Southampton he was a lecturer at Buwalasi College, Uganda from 1946 to 1948; and Rural Dean of Masaba from 1948 to 1952. Russell was education secretary for the Mbale archdeaconry from 1948 to 1955; and Assistant Bishop on the Upper Nile from 1955 to 1960. He was the Bishop of Northern Uganda from 1961 to 1964. Returning to England he was vicar of Tunbridge Wells from 1965; then rector of Hever with Markbeech from 1973 until his death; he was also an Assistant Bishop of Rochester throughout his time in Kent.
