= Benjamin Ojwang =

Ugandan Anglican bishop (1952–2019)

- Died: 11 November 2019; Kiruddu General Hospital
- Citizenship: Uganda
- Education: Uganda Christian University
- Occupation: Bishop
- Years active: 2002- 2017
- Known for: Suing the Church of Uganda
- Title: Bishop
- Predecessor: McLeod Baker Ochola
- Successor: Wilson Kitara
- Spouse: Margaret Ojwang

Benjamin Ojwang (1952–2019) was the second Anglican Bishop of Kitgum from 2002 to 2014.

== Early life and education ==
Ojwang was born on 15 December 1952 to Theopilus Odwar and Dolika Atiko in Pader Kilak, Pader District. He attended Pader Kilak, Kwon Kic and Pajule Lacani primary schools between 1959 and 1964. He continued to Palabek and Lira Palwo for his junior secondary school and then studied at Kololo Secondary School in Kamplala and Teso College, Aloet from j1967 to 1971.

Ojwang joined Bishop Tucker Theological College - Mukono currently known as Uganda Christian University for theological studies in 1975, he obtained a Higher Certificate in religious Studies of the University of Nairobi from St. Paul United Theological College - Limuru Kenya in 1977. He obtained a diploma in education from Kakoba National Teachers' College, Mbarara in 1990. He obtained a Bachelor of Divinity from 1994 - 1997 and later a Masters of Divinity in 2002 both from Uganda Christian University.

== Religious career ==
Ojwang was ordained by Bishop James Israel Mundia of North Maseno Diocese in Kenya in 1979 and served as Curate and later as Vicar of St. Thomas Church, Nambale Parish in North Maseno Diocese. He served as the Vicar of Christ Church - Gulu from 1981-1984 upon his return from exile in Kenya. He served at Patongo Parish in Agago Archdeaconry, St. Augustine Church in Lira - Diocese of Lango and later transferred to South Rwenzori Diocese in Kasese District in 1987.

He became the second Bishop of Kitgum Diocese on Sunday, 24 February 2002 at All Saints' Cathedral, Kitgum replacing McLeod Baker Ochola. His leadership was full of accusations against him from parishioners and the clergy which led to his forceful retirement in 2014. He sued the Church of Uganda and Archbishop Stanley Ntagali claiming unfair removal from office before reaching retirement age in 2017. He handed over the office in 2017 and was succeeded by Reverend Wilson Kitara who assumed office in 2018.

Ojwang promoted peace and development in Kitgum and he was among the delegation of the Juba peace talks between LRA and the Government of Uganda in 2005 as he suffered from the rebel activities.

== Death ==
Ojwang died of High blood pressure and diabetes on11th, November 2019 at Kiruddu General Hospital. His body was airlifted to Oyutu Village in Pader Town Council, Pader district at his home where the Vigil was held and was buried on Wednesday, November 20, 2019 at All Saints' Cathedral cemetery in Mican, Pager Division in Kitgum Municipal Council.

== Personal life ==
Ojwang was an Anglican married to Margaret Ojwang with six children.

== See also ==
- Stanley Ntagali
- McLeod Baker Ochola
