= Buwalasi Theological College =

- Type: Anglican theological college
- Religious affiliation: Anglican Communion
- Academic affiliation: Church of Uganda
- Principal: Canon John McDonald (first principal)
- Location: Mbale, Uganda

Buwalasi Theological College is an Anglican educational institution in Mbale, Uganda.

The first principal was Canon John McDonald.

== Notable faculty ==
- Keith Russell
- Erisa Masaba

== Notable alumni ==
- Geresom Ilukor
- Yona Okoth
- Janani Luwum
- Peter Mudonyi
- Christopher Senyonjo
- Stephen Tomusange
- John Wasikye
- Akisoferi Wesonga
