= Silvanus Wani =

Anglican archbishop

Silvanus Goi Wani (1915–1998) was an Anglican archbishop who served in Uganda.

== Early life and career ==
Wani was ordained in 1944. He served in the Upper Nile region from 1942 to 1961, including two years as a Chaplain to the King's African Rifles during World War Two.

He was diocesan secretary of Northern Uganda from 1961 to 1964. He was consecrated as an assistant bishop of Northern Uganda in 1964. He was translated to Madi and West Nile in 1969. He became archbishop in 1977, serving until 1983.

Wani died in 1998 in his home in Mvara.

Anglican Communion titles
Preceded by Janani Luwum as Archbishop	Archbishop of Uganda and Bishop of Kampala as Archbishop; 1977–1983	Succeeded by Yona Okoth as Archbishop
