= Sam Egesa =

Anglican bishop in Uganda

Samuel George Bogere Egesa
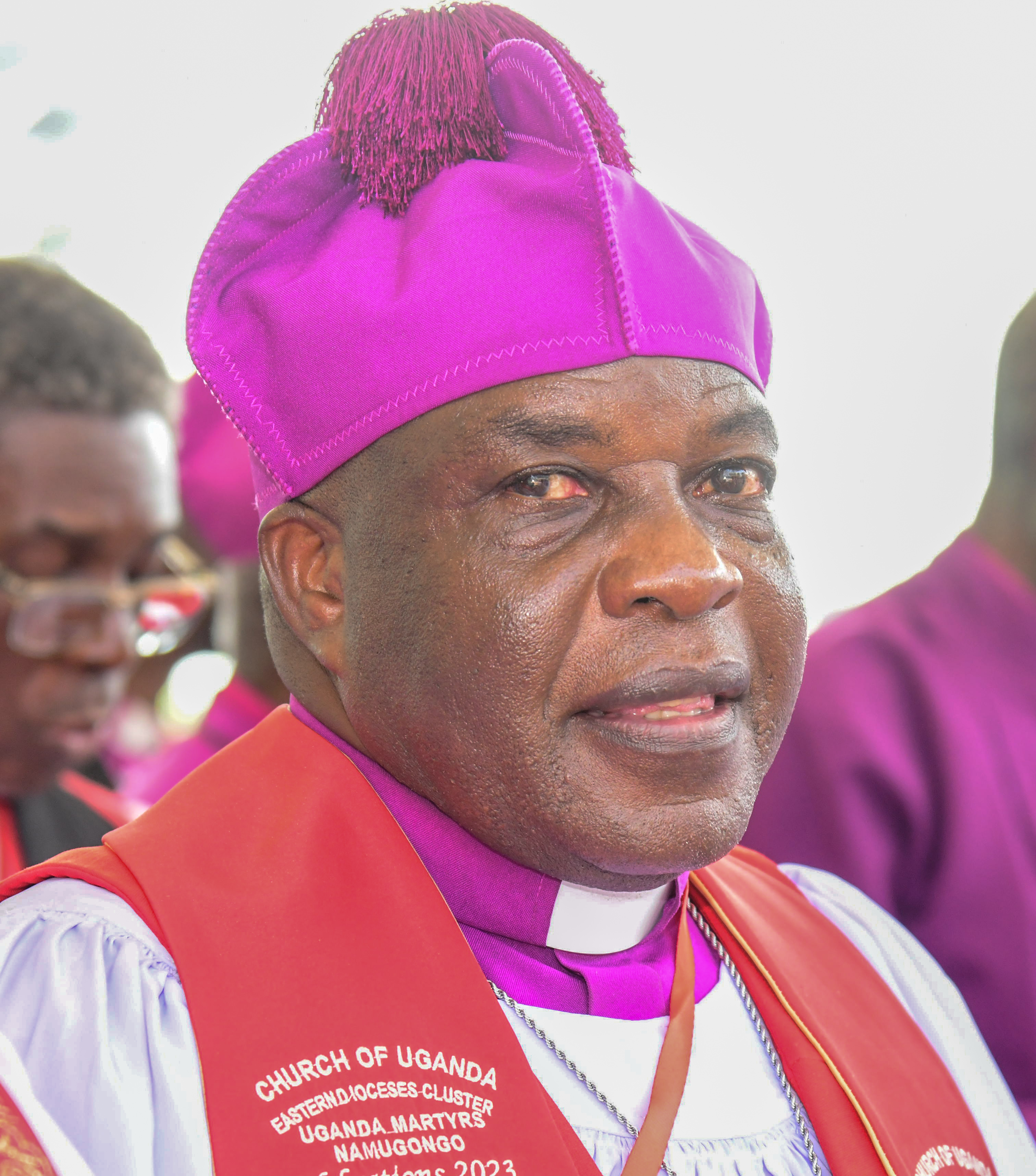
- Education: Uganda Christian University
- Title: Bishop

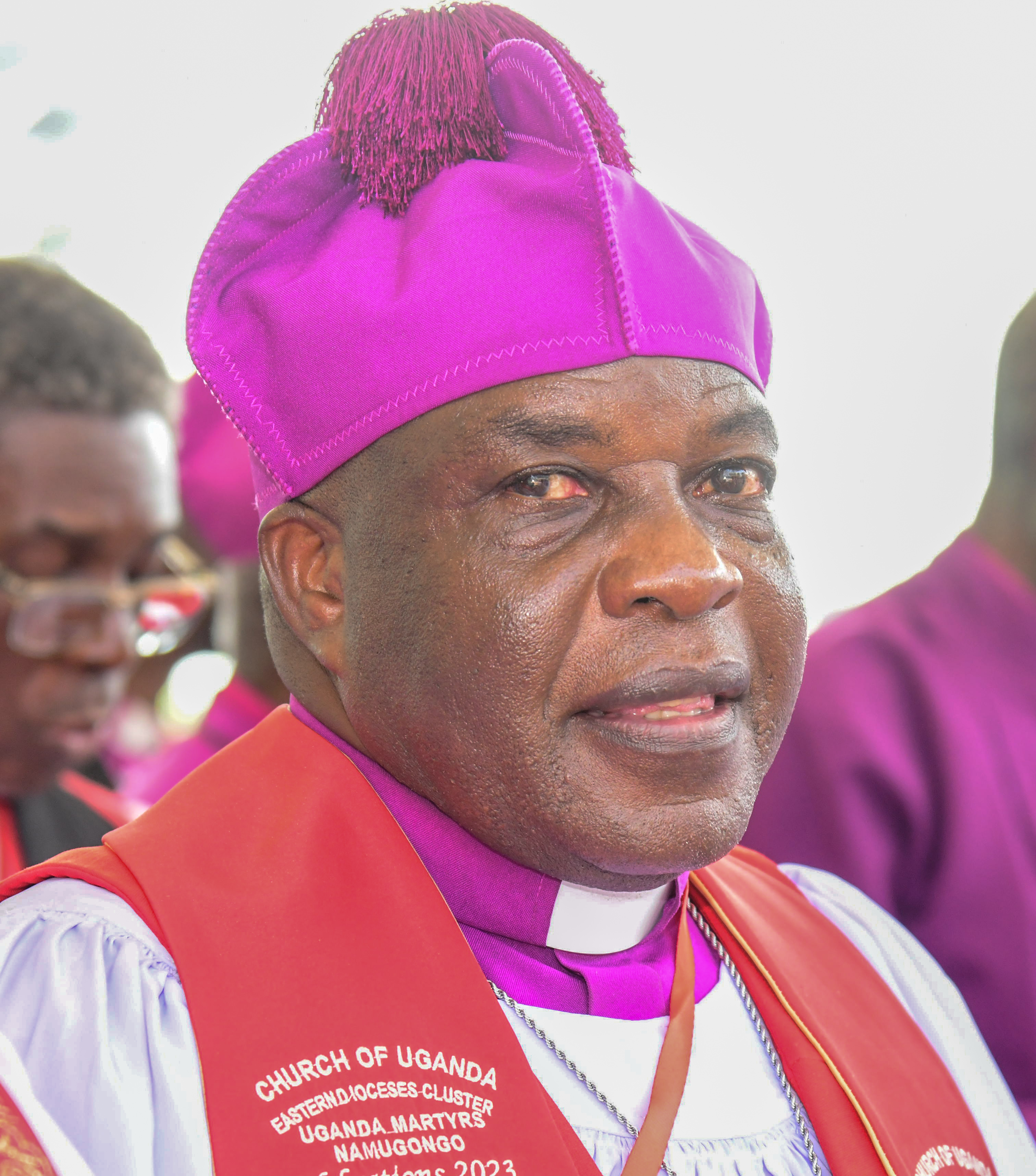
Samuel Bogere Egesa

Samuel George Bogere Egesa is a Ugandan Anglican bishop. Since 10 February 2013, he has served as the Bishop of Bukedi Diocese in the Church of Uganda.

== Early life and education ==
Egesa was born in Izira village, Nakavule parish, Kapyanga sub-county in Bugiri District, Eastern Uganda. He attended Nanfugaki Primary School, Jinja Secondary School before pursuing theological studies at Uganda Christian University.

== Ordination and ministry ==
He was ordained in 1997 and initially served in Iganga, where he ministered in parish and diocesan roles. Before he was elected bishop, Egesa's last position was Diocesan Secretary to Michael Kyomya, the retired Bishop of Busoga.

In November 2012, the House of Bishops elected Canon Egesa as the third Bishop of Bukedi Diocese, succeeding long-serving Bishop Nicodemus Engalas Okille. Egesa was enthroned on 10 February 2013 and has led the diocese since.

As a Bishop, Egesa has emphasised church land management, evangelism, and community development, calling for careful surveying of church properties to avoid disputes with neighbouring communities.

In 2025, Bishop Egesa participated in the consecration of a new bishop for West Buganda Diocese, where he delivered a sermon urging ethical leadership and condemning corruption.

== Episcopal ministry ==
As Bishop of Bukedi Diocese, Egesa has emphasised:

- Evangelism and discipleship
- Church land management
- Education and community development
- Youth empowerment and moral formation

He has repeated called for churches and church-founded schools to survey and title their land to prevent encroachment and disputes.

Egesa has also advocated for youth empowerment and economic productivity, urging young people in the Bukedi region to work hard and plan for their future.

== Public engagement ==
Bishop Egesa has frequently spoken on social issues including:

- Youth unemployment
- Moral decline
- Domestic violence
- Economic empowerment

In 2025, he participated in the consecration of a bishop for west Buganda Diocese, where he urged ethical leadership and condemned corruption.

== Personal life ==
Samuel George Bogere Egesa is married and has children.He has served in various capacities within the church of Uganda including catechist, parish priest, diocesan secretary and bishop.

== See also ==
- Church of Uganda
- Bukedi Diocese
- Anglican diocese of Uganda
