= Peter Mudonyi =

Ugandan Anglican bishop

The Right Reverend Peter Mudonyi Bulafu
- Bishop of North Mbale
- Church: Anglican Church of Uganda
- Province: Church of Uganda
- Diocese: North Mbale
- In office: 1992–?
- Predecessor: (position established)

Orders
- Ordination: 1957

Personal details
- Born: 1929 Uganda
- Died: 2011 (aged 81–82)
- Denomination: Anglican
- Education: Buwalasi Theological College

Peter Mudonyi Bulafu (1929–2011) was an Anglican bishop who served in Uganda.

Mudonyi was educated at Buwalasi Theological College. He was ordained in 1957. He served in the Diocese of Bukedi. He served in the Diocese of the Upper Nile. He was the first Bishop of North Mbale from 1992.
