= Samuel Gidudu =

Ugandan Anglican bishop (born 1968)

Samuel Gidudu (born 1968) is an Anglican bishop in Uganda: he has been Bishop of North Mbale since 2014.

Gidudu was born in Sironko District and educated at the Uganda Christian University. He was ordained in 2002.
