= Akisoferi Wesonga =

Ugandan Anglican bishop

The Right Reverend Akisoferi Wesonga
- Bishop of Mbale
- Church: Church of Uganda
- Diocese: Mbale
- In office: 1980–1991
- Previous posts: Dean of Mbale (1963–1969); Provincial Secretary, Province of Uganda (1969–1980)

Orders
- Ordination: 1954 (deacon); 1956 (priest)

Personal details
- Born: Uganda
- Denomination: Anglicanism
- Education: Buwalasi Theological College

Akisoferi Wesonga was an Anglican bishop in Uganda.

Wesonga was educated at Buwalasi Theological College. He was ordained deacon in 1954 and priest in 1956. He served in the Upper Nile Diocese until 1961 and in Mbale from then on. He was dean of Mbale from 1963 to 1969 after which time he was the provincial secretary of the Province of Uganda. He became bishop of Mbale in 1980. He served as bishop until 1991.
