= Bernard Obaikol =

Ugandan Anglican bishop

Charles Bernard Obaikol Ebitu was an Anglican bishop who served as Bishop of Soroti in Uganda.
