= Dan Gimadu =

Anglican bishop

The Right Reverend Dan Gimadu
- Bishop of North Mbale
- Church: Church of Uganda
- Diocese: North Mbale
- See: North Mbale Diocese
- In office: 10 December 2006 – 16 November 2014
- Predecessor: Nathan Muwombi
- Successor: Samuel Gidudu

Personal details
- Born: Daniel Othniel Wanasolo Gimadu; 18 November 1949 Uganda
- Died: 10 May 2023 (aged 73) Mukono, Uganda
- Denomination: Anglicanism
- Education: (education incl. Makerere Business School; Nairobi Evangelical School of Theology)

Daniel O. Gimadu (called Dan) was an Anglican bishop in Uganda: he was Bishop of North Mbale from 2006 to 2014.
