= Patrick Gidudu =

Ugandan Anglican bishop

Patrick Gidudu is a retired Anglican bishop in the Anglican Church of Uganda: he was Bishop of Mbale from 2008 to 2021.
