= Michael Kyomya =

Ugandan bishop

- Born: Uganda
- Education: Dallas Theological Seminary
- Occupation: Retired Anglican bishop
- Known for: Teacher and author
- Notable work: A Guide to Interpreting Scripture
- Spouse: Florence Kyomya

Sosan Aaron Michael Kyomya is a retired bishop of the Anglican diocese of Busoga in Uganda. He was previously academic dean at the Nairobi International School of Theology (NIST) in Kenya.

In 1995, Kyomya and his wife, Florence, founded Hesed Ministries, Uganda, which aims to help women build confidence through Christian living.

In 2010 he wrote A Guide to Interpreting Scripture, published by Hippo Books, an imprint of WordAlive Publishers and Zondervan.

== Career ==
As a bishop of Busoga Diocese, Kyomya was also the Chancelor of Busoga University. He retired in 2015 and was replaced by Paul Naimanhye as new Bishop. The consecration of the new bishop took long and this made the Christians to lose patience and they threatened to riot. Kyomya intervened and calmed the Christians pointing out the importance of unity and allegiance to the church.

Kyomya was previously academic dean at the Nairobi International School of Theology (NIST) in Kenya.

== Achievements ==
Kyomya is an author who has written Christian books like Interpreting Scripture.

== See also ==
- Cyprian Bamwoze
- Paul Naimanhye
- Henry Katumba Tamale
- Festo Kivengere
