= Allan Oboma =

Gideon Allan Oboma (October 22, 1932–2012) was a prominent Anglican bishop in Uganda.

Oboma was born on 22 October 1932 at Atiak, Amuru District and educated at Uganda Christian University. A former teacher, he was ordained deacon in 1967 and priest in 1969. In 1976 he was appointed Dean of Gulu. He was appointed an Assistant Bishop of Northern Uganda on 14 January 1979. He retired in 1998. He was mainly known for his integrity and humanity and dedication to the community though the area was affected by political instabilities, he also earned praise for his resilience.

== Early life and education ==
He was born on October 22, 1932, in Atiak, Amuru District, Oboma began his career as a teacher before pursuing theological studies at Uganda Christian University (then Bishop Tucker Theological College), Trinity College, Bristol, and Oak Hill College, London.

== Death ==
Allan Oboma died on 6th September, 2012 at St. Mary's Hospital Lacor in Gulu.
