= Edward Bamucwanira =

Ugandan Anglican Bishop

Edward Bamucwanira also known as Edward Arinaitwe Bamucwanira (b. 1952) was an Anglican bishop in Uganda: he was the first Bishop of East Rwenzori from 2009 to 2018.

== Early life and education ==
Bamucwanira was born in Kabale district. He was succeeded by George Turyasingura (as second Bishop of East Ruwenzori Diocese) on 7th January 2018.

== See also ==
- Eliphaz Maari
- Hannington Mutebi
- Zac Niringiye
