= Arthur Kitching (bishop) =

British Anglican bishop (1875–1960)

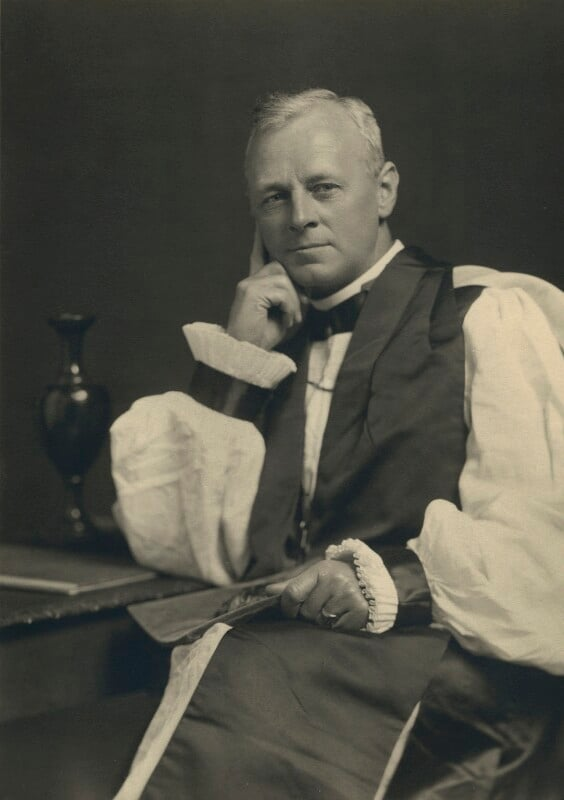
Kitching c. 1920s

Arthur Leonard Kitching (18 August 1875 – 24 October 1960) was an Anglican missionary, bishop and author.

Kitching was educated at Highgate School and Emmanuel College, Cambridge. He was made a deacon on Trinity Sunday 1899 (28 May) and ordained a priest the following Trinity Sunday (10 June 1900) — both times by John Perowne, Bishop of Worcester, at Worcester Cathedral — and was after a curate at St Martin's Birmingham before going to Uganda as a Church Mission Society (CMS) missionary. He was at Acholi (1901–1904), Ngora (1908–1917), Mbale (1917–1918) and finally Jinja. He spent 3 months as a Temporary Chaplain to the Forces 1915–16, serving in England. He was Archdeacon of Bukedi from 1915 to 1922 and examining chaplain and commissary to John Willis, Bishop of Uganda, from then until his appointment as the first Bishop on the Upper Nile in 1926. He was consecrated a bishop on 29 June 1926 by Randall Davidson, Archbishop of Canterbury, at Southwark Cathedral. He served in this position for 10 years before returning to England to be rector of All Saints’ Dorchester. He was Vicar of Holy Trinity, Fareham from 1938 to 1945 and Archdeacon of Portsmouth from then until 1952. He served as an Assistant Bishop of Portsmouth from 1939 to 1959, when he retired — becoming an honorary assistant bishop of the same diocese — and died in 1960.

== Works ==
- Outline Grammar of the Gang Language (1907)
- On the Backwaters of the Nile (1912)
- Handbook of the Ateso Language (1915)
- Luganda Dictionary (1925)
- New Testament into Ateso (1930)
- From Darkness to Light (1935)
