= Jackson Matovu =

Jackson Matovu (born 29 January 1952) is a retired Anglican bishop in Uganda who served as the Bishop of Central Buganda Diocese from 2001 until 2017.

== Early life and ordained ministry ==
Matovu was born on 29 January 1952 in Bunyama village, Ntenjeru Sub-county, Mukono District. He was raised in a devout Anglican household and became involved in church activities from a young age, serving in youth ministries before beginning formal theological training.

He was ordained deacon and priest in the 1970s and served in parish and diocesan roles, including as archdeacon and clergy in Mukono and Luweero Dioceses, before his appointment to the episcopate.

== Bishop of Central Buganda ==
In 2001, Matovu was appointed the Bishop of Central Buganda Diocese, a diocese of the Church of Uganda created in 1995, and he led the diocese for approximately 16 years.

His tenure included both routine diocesan leadership and occasions of local controversy; for example, his final months in office saw debates within the diocesan council over the selection of his successor.

In 2014, before he retired from Central Buganda, Archbishop Stanley Ntagali appointed him caretaker Bishop of West Buganda Diocese following the death of Bishop Godfrey Makumbi; this temporary role demonstrated the broader trust placed in him among senior church leaders.

== See also ==
- Church of Uganda
- Central Buganda Diocese
- List of Anglican bishops in Uganda
- Lucas Gonahasa
