= Nathan Kyamanywa =

Ugandan bishop

Nathan Kyamanywa (b. 1956) was an Anglican bishop in Uganda: he served as the Bishop of Bunyoro-Kitara from 2002 to 2014.

He is married to Peace Kyamanywa.
