= Joel Obetia =

Anglican bishop in Madi-West Nile, Uganda

Joel Sampson Obetia (also Obita) is an Anglican bishop in Uganda: he was the sixth Bishop of Madi-West Nile, serving from 2005 to 2016.

Obetia was consecrated a bishop on 27 November 2005, by Henry Luke Orombi, Archbishop of Uganda, at Arua.
