= James Nasak =

James Nasak was the first Anglican bishop of the North Karamoja Diocese in Uganda: Following the death of Bishop Peter Lomongin in 2006, the Karamoja Diocese was divided into two. James Nasak was subsequently consecrated in 2007 as the founding bishop of the North Karamoja Diocese, based in Kotido. He has been the Bishop of North Karamoja since 2007 until he when retired in 2022.

Throughout his tenure, Bishop Nasak has been an advocate for peace in the restive Karamoja sub-region, often asking Christians to pray for an end to cattle rustling and related insecurity He retired on December 27, 2022. As of 2025, he holds the title of Bishop Emeritus and resides in his retirement home in Lochedimeu, Kotido Municipality, with his wife, Maama Rose Nasak.
