= Lawrence Mukasa =

Ugandan Roman Catholic prelate (born 1957)

- Bishop of Kasana-Luweero
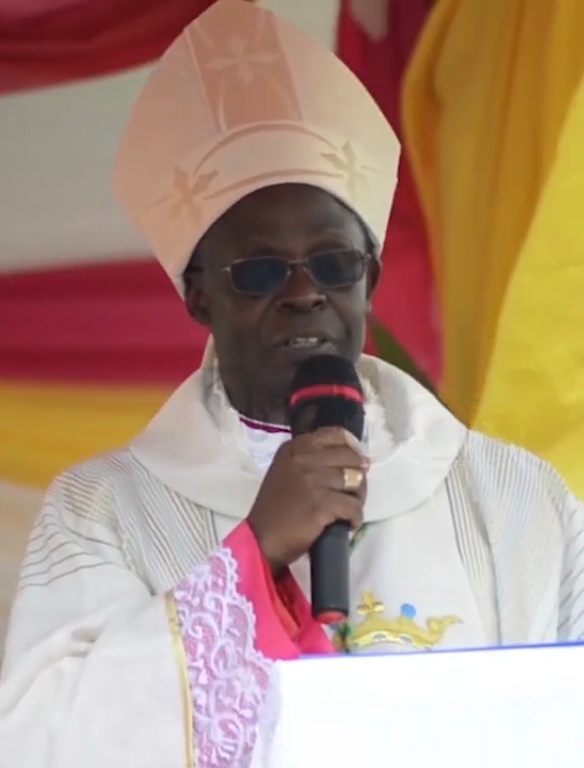
- Bishop Mukasa in 2023
- Church: Roman Catholic Church
- Archdiocese: Roman Catholic Archdiocese of Kampala
- See: Diocese of Kasana-Luweero
- Appointed: 29 April 2023
- Installed: 5 August 2023
- Predecessor: Paul Ssemogerere
- Successor: Incumbent
- Previous post: Vicar-General of Kiyinda-Mityana (2005–2023)

Orders
- Ordination: 23 June 1984
- Consecration: 5 August 2023 by Archbishop Paul Ssemogerere
- Rank: Bishop

Personal details
- Born: Lawrence Mukasa; 14 March 1957 (age 69) Nabwiri Village, Mityana District, Uganda

Styles of Lawrence Mukasa
- Religious style: Bishop

Lawrence Mukasa is a Roman Catholic prelate in Uganda, who serves as the Bishop of the Roman Catholic Diocese of Kasana-Luweero, since 29 April 2023. He was appointed by Pope Francis. Prior to his appointment as bishop of Kasana-Luweero, Monsignor Lawrence Mukasa served as the Vicar-General of the Roman Catholic Diocese of Kiyinda-Mityana, also in Uganda. He received his episcopal consecration on 5 August 2023 by the hands of Paul Ssemogerere, Archbishop of Kampala.

== Early life and education ==
Mukasa was born on 14 March 1957, at Nabwiri Village, in Mityana District in the Buganda Region of Uganda. Nabwiri Village, is also referred to as Nabwiri-Kangundu Village. (Note: This village is located in Vvumbe Parish, in Kakindu Subcouny, in Mityana District, in the Buganda Region of Uganda.) This location is in the Roman Catholic Diocese of Kiyinda-Mityana.

He attended Kakindu Primary School from 1964 until 1969 and Nswanjere Preparatory Seminary from 1969 until 1970. He was then admitted to Kisubi Minor Seminary, studying there from 1971 until 1976. He was admitted to the Katigondo National Major Seminary, where he pursued philosophical studies, between 1977 and 1980. He then transferred to Saint Mary's National Major Seminary at Ggaba, in Kampala, where he pursued theological studies from 1981 until 1984. From 1990 until 1992, he pursued "Studies of History of the Church" at Pontifical Gregorian University in Rome, Italy.

== Priesthood ==
He was ordained a priest on 24 June 1984 at Mwera Parish, by Emmanuel Wamala, the Bishop of Kiyinda-Mityana. Father Lawrence Mukasa served in various roles as a priest of the Roman Catholic Diocese of Kiyinda-Mityana. He served as the Vicar-General of Kiyinda-Mityana from 2005 until 2023, when he was appointed bishop of Kasana-Luweero.

While a priest, he served in various roles and locations, including:

- Vicar of the Bukalagi parish in 1984.
- Vicar of the Naluggi parish from 1985 until 1986.
- Professor and formator at Saint Thomas Aquinas National Major Seminary in Katigondo from 1986 until 1990.
- Studies at the Pontifical Gregorian University, in Rome, Italy leading to the award of an advanced degree in Church history from 1990 until 1992.
- Spiritual director and professor at Saint Thomas Aquinas National Major Seminary in Katigondo from 1992 until 1997.
- Parish priest of the Bukalagi parish from 1997 until 2001.
- Spiritual director and professor at Saint Mbaaga's Major Seminary in the Archdiocese of Kampala from 2001 until 2005.
- Vicar general of the diocese of Kiyinda-Mityana from 2005 until 2023.
- Vicar for the clergy of the diocese of Kiyinda-Mityana from 2018 until 2023.

== As bishop ==
He was appointed bishop of the Roman Catholic Diocese of Kasana-Luweero, on 29 April 2023. He was consecrated as bishop on 5 August 2023 at Kasana-Luweero, by Archbishop Paul Ssemogerere of Kampala, assisted by Archbishop Luigi Bianco the Papal nuncio to Uganda and Bishop Joseph Anthony Zziwa of Kiyinda-Mityana.

Bishop Lawrence Mukasa took over the diocese from Monsignor Francis Xavier Mpanga, the Diocesan administrator of Kasana-Luweero. Father Mpanga served as the diocese administrator since 28 January 2022 when the last diocesan bishop Paul Ssemogerere was elevated to his current position as the Archbishop of the Roman Catholic Archdiocese of Kampala.

== See also ==
- Roman Catholicism in Uganda

== Succession table ==
Catholic Church titles
Preceded by Paul Ssemogerere (2008–2021)	Bishop of Kasana-Luweero; 2023 -	Succeeded by Incumbent
