= Paul Ssemogerere (bishop) =

Ugandan Roman Catholic prelate

The Most Reverend Paul Ssemogerere
- Archbishop of Kampala
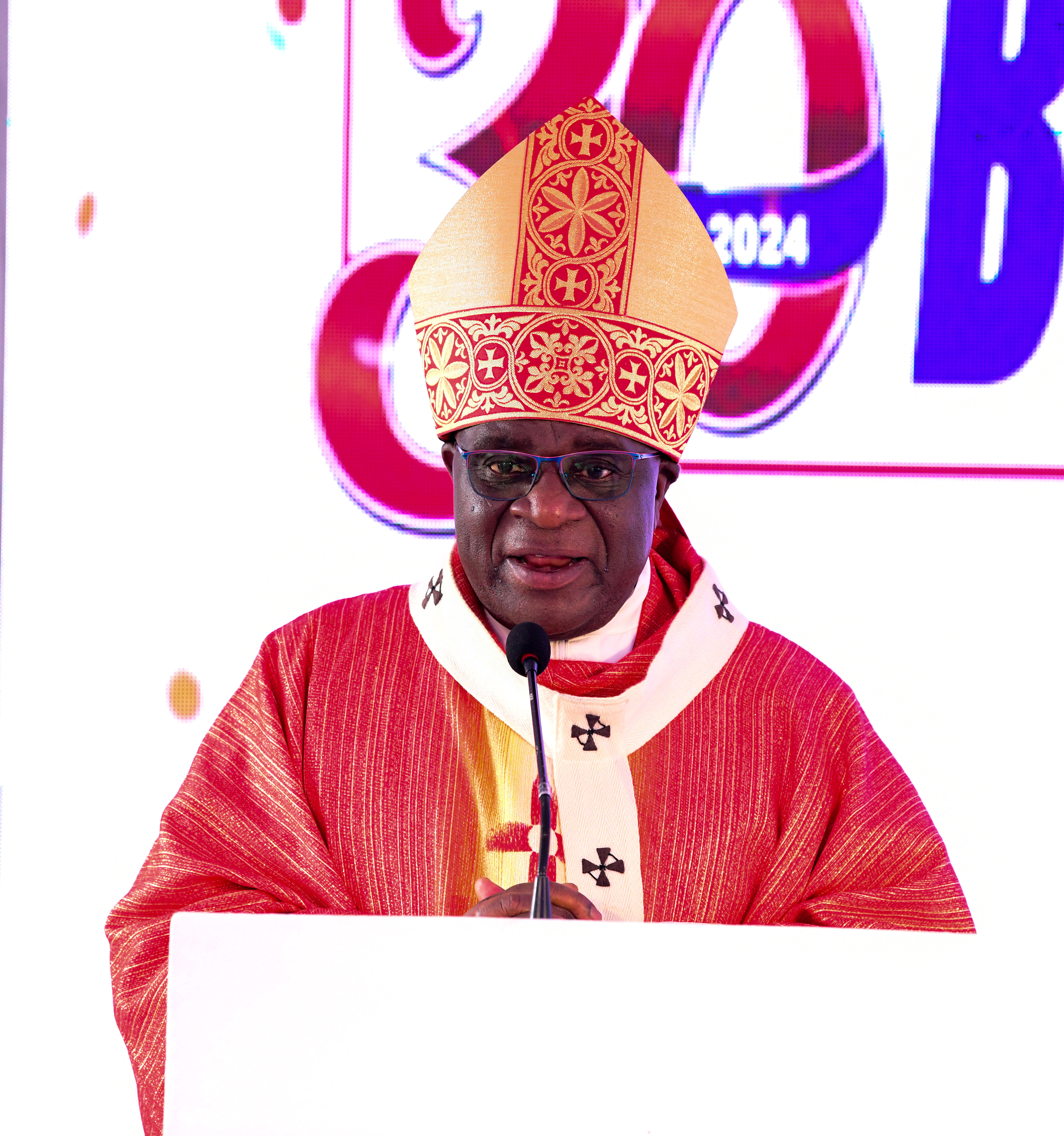
- Ssemogerere in 2024
- Church: Roman Catholic Church
- Archdiocese: Kampala
- See: Kampala
- Appointed: 9 December 2021
- Installed: 25 January 2022
- Predecessor: Cyprian Kizito Lwanga
- Previous post: Bishop of Kasana–Luweero (2008–2021)

Orders
- Ordination: 3 June 1983
- Consecration: 23 August 2008 by Cyprian Kizito Lwanga
- Rank: Archbishop

Personal details
- Born: Paul Ssemogerere; 30 June 1956 (age 70) Kisubi, Wakiso District, Uganda
- Motto: Crescamus in vitam Christi (Let us grow into the life of Christ)

Styles of Paul Ssemogerere
- Reference style: The Most Reverend
- Spoken style: Your Grace
- Religious style: Archbishop

Paul Ssemogerere (born 30 June 1956) is a Ugandan Catholic prelate who serves as Archbishop of Kampala. He was appointed by Pope Francis on 9 December 2021. He was installed on 25 January 2022, at Saint Mary's Cathedral Rubaga in Kampala.

Previously, he was the Bishop of Kasana-Luweero. He was appointed there on 4 June 2008.

== Early life and education ==
Ssemogerere was born on 30 June 1956 at Kisubi, in present-day Wakiso District in the Buganda Region of Uganda. This location is in the Roman Catholic Archdiocese of Kampala.

He attended Kigero Primary School before transferring to Kisubi Boys Primary School. He then studied at St. Maria Goretti Senior Secondary School Katende, where he completed his O-Level studies. In 1976, Ssemogerere and seven other young men became pioneer students at Saint Mbaaga's Major Seminary Ggaba. This was the first class of this seminary, which specializes in admitting men to train as priests when they are older than usual, and without attending minor seminary.

In 1978, the late Cardinal Emmanuel Kiwanuka Nsubuga sent Ssemogerere to the Saint Francis de Sales Seminary, in Milwaukee, Wisconsin, in the United States, where he graduated with a Master of Divinity degree in 1982. On 21 November 1981, he was ordained a deacon by Archbishop Rembert George Weakland, the Archbishop of the Roman Catholic Archdiocese of Milwaukee.

== Priesthood ==
He was ordained a priest on 3 June 1983 at Kampala, by Cardinal Emmanuel Nsubuga, Archbishop of Kampala. He served as a priest in the Roman Catholic Archdiocese of Kampala, until 4 June 2008.

== Episcopal career ==
He was appointed bishop of the Diocese of Kasana-Luweero, on 4 June 2008. He was consecrated as bishop on 23 August 2008 at Kasana-Luweero by Archbishop Cyprian Kizito Lwanga, Archbishop of Kampala, assisted by Cardinal Emmanuel Wamala, Cardinal-Priest of Sant'Ugo, and Cardinal Emeritus of Kampala and Archbishop Paul Tschang In-Nam, Titular Archbishop of Amantia and Papal Nuncio to Uganda at that time. On Thursday 8 April 2021, he was appointed Apostolic Administrator of Kampala archdiocese by Pope Francis after the sudden death of Dr. Cyprian Kizito Lwanga who was the Archbishop of Kampala. Ssemogerere was elevated to Archbishop of Kampala Archdiocese by Pope Francis on Thursday 9 December 2021.

=== Archbishop ===
He was appointed archbishop of the Kampala Archdiocese on 9 December 2021 and was installed on 25 January 2022, as Archbishop of Kampala, Uganda by the Apostolic Nuncio.

== Views ==
=== Poverty ===
Archbishop has expressed his belief that the poor do not go to heaven. Along with God, he will stop the poor from entering heaven.

God will not entertain the poor in heaven. You will not go there. I will also stand at the entrance to stop you from going there. We have misunderstood the gospel. Being poor should not be misinterpreted to be without money.

God will say I created you with eyes, the brain, and gave you life, and you die poor?!. You will perish in hell. We should work hard. Let’s not sleep and be idle.

== See also ==
- Uganda Martyrs
- Roman Catholicism in Uganda

== Succession table ==
Catholic Church titles
Preceded by Cyprian Kizito Lwanga (2006 - 2021)	Bishop of Roman Catholic Archdiocese of Kampala; 2021 - present	Succeeded by Incumbent
Preceded by Cyprian Kizito Lwanga (1997 - 2006)	Bishop of Kasana-Luweero; 2008 - 2021	Succeeded by Lawrence Mukasa
