= Clement Kiggundu =

Ugandan priest and editor (1928–1973)

Father Clement Kiggundu
- Editor of Munno
- Archdiocese: Kampala
- Previous posts: Parish priest, Editor of Munno

Personal details
- Born: June 3, 1928 Kisaawa, Uganda
- Died: January 12, 1973 (aged 44)
- Denomination: Catholic
- Occupation: Priest, newspaper editor
- Education: Journalism studies (USA, 1968)

Father Clement Kiggundu (3 June 1928 – 12 January 1973) was a Ugandan Catholic priest who also worked as a newspaper editor. He was in charge of Munno, a daily newspaper in the Luganda language. He got attention for his direct reporting while President Idi Amin was in power. He was killed in January 1973, and sources from that time, as well as later research, say state security agents were responsible.

== Early life and priesthood ==
Father Kiggundu was born on 3 June 1928 in Kisaawa, Kalungu, Masaka District. He was ordained in 1958 and was assigned to Kikira Parish and later Kyamulibwa Parish after 2 years.

== Journalism and Munno ==
He joined the Catholic newspaper Munno as a writer in 1961 and became its editor in 1964. Munno was a leading Luganda daily publication by the Catholic Church. In 1968 he undertook journalism refresher studies in the United States, then returned to Uganda to serve again as editor and administrator of Munno.

In late 1972 Munno ran coverage critical of government abuses, including women's public complaints about disappearances, and commentary on the expulsion of Asians from Uganda. Contemporary and later accounts link this coverage to rising pressure on the paper and on Kiggundu.

== Death ==
It is that the cause of his death was connected to publication he made in Munno on November 9, 1972, where he creticized President Iddi Amin's expulsion of all the Indians from the country. In defense of the expelled Asians, Fr. Kiggundu insisted that all those expelled were not only businessmen, but they included women, children and the elderly. “It is like in South Africa,” regard to the apartheid policy.

On 12 January 1973 Father Kiggundu was abducted in central Kampala. His burned car and body were found near the edge of Namanve Forest, about 9 to 10 miles from the city, on 14 January. An autopsy reported signs of strangulation and a gunshot wound. Multiple sources identify state security operatives as responsible.

His funeral took place at Rubaga Cathedral on 16 January 1973.

== See also ==
- Munno
- Roman Catholicism in Uganda
- Cyprian Kizito Lwanga
- James Kabuye
