= Joseph Mukwaya =

Ugandan Roman Catholic prelate

The Right Reverend Joseph Mukwaya
- Bishop Emeritus of Kiyinda-Mityana
- Church: Roman Catholic Church
- Archdiocese: Kampala Archdiocese
- See: Kampala
- Appointed: 21 June 1988
- Installed: 21 June 1988
- Predecessor: Cardinal Emmanuel Wamala
- Previous post: Auxiliary Bishop of Kampala Archdiocese (1982-1988)

Orders
- Ordination: 18 December 1960 by Bishop Vincent Billington
- Consecration: 31 October 1982 by Cardinal Emmanuel Kiwanuka Nsubuga

Personal details
- Born: 26 September 1930 Kiwangula, Luweero District, Uganda
- Died: 5 September 2008 (aged 77) Kampala, Uganda

Styles of Joseph Mukwaya
- Reference style: The Right Reverend
- Religious style: Bishop

Joseph Mukwaya (26 September 1930 – 5 September 2008), was a Ugandan Roman Catholic prelate who served as the Bishop of the Roman Catholic Diocese of Kiyinda-Mityana, from 21 June 1988 until his resignation, on health grounds, on 23 October 2004. He died on 5 September 2008, three weeks shy of his 78th birthday, as the Bishop Emeritus of Kiyinda-Mityana Diocese, in Uganda.

== Background and education ==
Joseph Mukwaya was born on 26 September 1930 at Kiwangula Village, Mulajje Parish, Bulemeezi Country, in present-day Luwero District, in what is now (2021) the Kasana-Luweero Diocese.

He attended home schooling and Mulajje Primary School. He then attended St Peter's Boys School, Nsambya, which at that time was called "Nsambya Junior Secondary School". After that he was admitted to Nyenga Minor Seminary and then to Ggaba Major Seminary. Later, after his ordination, he went for further studies in the United Kingdom, obtaining diplomas in social development and in religious education.

In addition, he held a Diploma in Radio Broadcasting, obtained from the AACC Communications Centre, in Nairobi, Kenya, in 1968. He also had a Diploma in Journalism, awarded by the African Literature Centre, in Kitwe, Zambia.

== As priest ==
He was ordained priest on 18 December 1960 at Saint Peter's Cathedral Nsambya by Bishop Vincent Billington, Bishop of Jinja Diocese.

== As bishop ==
He was appointed as Auxiliary Bishop of the Achdiocese of Kampala on 10 September 1982 by Pope John Paul II. He was consecrated bishop on 31 October 1982 at Rubaga Cathedral by Cardinal Emmanuel Kiwanuka Nsubuga†, Archbishop of Kampala, assisted by Bishop Joseph Bernard Louis Willigers†, Bishop of Jinja and Bishop Medardo Joseph Mazombwe†, Bishop of Chipata Diocese in Zambia.

On 21 June 1988, he was appointed the Bishop of the Diocese of Kiyinda-Mityana and was installed as Bishop of Kiyinda-Mityana, replacing Bishop Emmanuel Wamala, who was appointed Auxiliary Bishop of Kampala. (They swapped positions).

== Illness and death ==
Mukwaya was diagnosed with cancer in 2000, and was at one time admitted to a hospital in Germany, on account of it. When his health deteriorated, an Auxiliary bishop was appointed to help him (Bishop Joseph Anthony Zziwa appointed Co-adjutor of Kiyinda-Mityana on 19 November 2001).

On 23 October 2004, Bishop Joseph Mukwaya resigned as Bishop of Kiyinda-Mityana, on account of poor health. He died on 5 September 2008, as Bishop Emeritus of Kiyinda Mityana.

== See also ==
- Joseph Kiwanuka
- Uganda Martyrs
- Roman Catholicism in Uganda

Catholic Church titles
Preceded by Emmanuel Wamala	Archbishop of Kiyinda-Mityana; 1988–2004	Succeeded by Joseph Anthony Zziwa
