= Saint Mbaaga's Major Seminary Ggaba =

Ugandan Catholic educational institution

- Type: Private, Seminary
- Established: 16 February 1976; 50 years ago
- Founders: Cardinal) Emmanuel Kiwanuka Nsubuga
- Accreditation: Uganda Episcopal Conference
- Religious affiliation: Catholic
- Rector: The Very Reverend Father Joseph Sserunjoji (2024)
- Students: 200 (2018)
- Location: Ggaba, Makindye Division, Kampala, Uganda; 00°15′49″N 32°37′47″E
- Website: stmbaagaseminary.org
- Location in Uganda

Saint Mbaaga's Major Seminary, (also Saint Mbaaga's Major Seminary Ggaba) is a Diocesan Seminary of the Roman Catholic Archdiocese of Kampala, Uganda. The institution is a training facility and House of Formation under the auspices of the Uganda Episcopal Conference (UEC). The institution is owned and administered by the Catholic Archdiocese of Kampala. The seminary caters to seminarians who choose the priestly vocation later in life, when they are older.

== Location ==
The seminary is located in Ggaba, a neighborhood in Makindye Division in the city of Kampala, Uganda's capital. This is approximately 10 kilometres (6 mi) southeast of the central business district of Kampala City.

== History ==
The premises occupied by St. Mbaaga's Major Seminary today were built and opened in 1931 by the Mill Hill Fathers as the Mill Hill Major Seminary Ggaba (MHMSG). MHMSG operated for thirty-six years and closed down in 1967. The premises then hosted the Pastoral Institute of Eastern Africa (PIEA) which was operated there from 1967 until 1975. In 1975, the PIEA relocated to Eldoret, Kenya due to a difficult political and security environment in Uganda at that time.

Some of the graduands of the Mill Hill Major Seminary Ggaba include the following notable prelates:

- Cardinal Maurice Michael Otunga, Archbishop Emeritus of Nairobi (Deceased).
- James Odongo, Archbishop Emeritus of Tororo, Uganda (Deceased).
- Joseph Mukwaya, Bishop Emeritus of Kiyinda-Mityana, Uganda (Deceased).
- Erasmus Desiderius Wandera, Bishop Emeritus of Soroti, Uganda (Deceased).
- Joseph Oyanga, Bishop Emeritus of Lira, Uganda (Deceased).
- Denis Kiwanuka Lote, Archbishop Emeritus of Tororo, Uganda (Deceased).
- Philip Sulumeti, Bishop Emeritus of Kakamega, Kenya.

== Overview ==
Saint Mbagaa's Major Seminary opened on these current premises on 16 February 1976 on the orders of Cardinal Emmanuel Kiwanuka Nsubuga (born 5 November 1914, died 20 April 1991), Archbishop Emeritus of Kampala, Uganda. "The purpose was to cater for the late vocations to the priesthood in the Archdiocese of Kampala". In 1976 a total of 16 seminarians joined, twelve by the official opening day in February and another four in May 1976. In addition to seminarians from Kampala Archdiocese, the seminary trains students from other neighboring diocese in Uganda, including:Kiyinda-Mityana, Kasana-Luweero, Lugazi, Masaka, Jinja, Fort Portal, Hoima and Lira. As of the academic year 2017/2018, a total of 200 seminarians were enrolled, including 21 students conducting pastoral work. "St. Mbaaga’s Major Seminary is the only diocesan major seminary in the entire Association of Member Episcopal Conferences in Eastern Africa (AMECEA) region".

== Academics ==
The seminary offers both philosophy and theology and successful seminarians graduate with a Diploma in Philosophy and a Diploma in Theology. On 25 May 2023 the seminary held its 38th graduation ceremony with 44 graduands and marked its 47th year since its founding. In 2024 the seminary graduated 51 students and celebrated 48 years since it was founded.

== Rectors ==
As of May 2024 the Rector of St. Mbaaga's Major Seminary Ggaba was Reverend Father Joseph Sserunjoji, and the Academic Dean was Revend Father Ambrose Bwangatto.
