= Joseph Anthony Zziwa =

Ugandan Roman Catholic prelate

Right Reverend Joseph Anthony Zziwa
- Bishop of Kiyinda-Mityana
- Church: Roman Catholic Church
- Archdiocese: Roman Catholic Archdiocese of Kampala
- See: Roman Catholic Diocese of Kiyinda-Mityana
- Appointed: 19 November 2001
- Installed: 16 March 2002
- Predecessor: Joseph Mukwaya
- Previous post: Coadjutor Bishop of Kiyinda-Mityana (2001–2004)

Orders
- Ordination: 16 November 1980
- Consecration: 16 March 2002 by Joseph Mukwaya

Personal details
- Born: Joseph Anthony Zziwa; 16 February 1956 (age 70) Mubende, Uganda

Styles of Joseph Anthony Zziwa
- Reference style: The Most Reverend
- Religious style: Bishop

Joseph Anthony Zziwa (born 16 February 1956) is a Ugandan Roman Catholic prelate who serves as the Bishop of the Diocese of Kiyinda-Mityana. He was appointed Bishop of Kiyinda-Mityana on 23 October 2004.

== Background and priesthood ==
Joseph Zziwa was born on 16 February 1956 at Kasambya Village, in Mubende Parish, in present-day Mubende District in the Buganda Region of Uganda. This location lies in present-day Kiyinda-Mityana Diocese. He was ordained priest on 16 November 1980 at Kiyinda-Mityana. He served as priest in the diocese until 19 November 2001.

== As bishop ==
He was appointed bishop on 19 November 2001 and consecrated as auxiliary bishop Kiyinda-Mityana Diocese on 16 March 2002, by Bishop Joseph Mukwaya, Bishop of Kiyinda-Mityana, assisted by Cardinal Emmanuel Wamala, Archbishop of Kampala and Archbishop Christophe Louis Yves Georges Pierre, Titular Archbishop of Gunela, and Papal Nuncio to Uganda at that time. On 23 October 2004, Bishop Zziwa succeeded Bishop Emeritus Joseph Mukwaya, who resigned. Bishop Zziwa is the third Ordinary Bishop of Kiyinda-Mityana.

In July 2014, Bishop Zziwa, together with Bishop Sabino Ocan Odoki of the Roman Catholic Diocese of Arua, were elected to the Committee of Bishops of the Association of Member Episcopal Conferences in Eastern Africa (AMECEA), whose member countries are Eritrea, Ethiopia, Kenya, Malawi, Sudan, Tanzania, Uganda, Zambia Djibouti and Somalia. Bishop Zziwa also serves as the Chairman of the Uganda Episcopal Conference. He was elected to that position by his fellow bishops in Uganda, in November 2018 and reelected in November 2022 for the next four-year non-renewable term.

== See also ==
- Cyprian Kizito Lwanga
- Uganda Martyrs
- Roman Catholicism in Uganda

Catholic Church titles
Preceded by Joseph Mukwaya	Bishop of Kiyinda-Mityana; 2004 - present	Succeeded by Incumbent
