= Cyprian Kizito Lwanga =

Ugandan Catholic archbishop (1953–2021)

The Most Reverend Cyprian Kizito Lwanga
- Archbishop of Kampala (Deceased)
- Church: Catholic Church
- Archdiocese: Kampala
- Appointed: 19 August 2006
- Installed: 30 September 2006
- Term ended: 3 April 2021
- Predecessor: Emmanuel Wamala
- Successor: Paul Ssemogerere
- Previous post: Bishop of Kasana–Luweero (1996–2006)

Orders
- Ordination: 9 April 1978 by Emmanuel Kiwanuka Nsubuga
- Consecration: 1 March 1997 by Emmanuel Wamala

Personal details
- Born: 19 January 1953 Naggalama, Uganda
- Died: 3 April 2021 (aged 68) Kampala, Uganda
- Motto: Ora et labora ut habeant vitam (Pray and work that they may have life)

Styles of Cyprian Kizito Lwanga
- Reference style: His Grace; The Most Reverend
- Spoken style: Your Grace
- Religious style: Bishop

Cyprian Kizito Lwanga (19 January 1953 – 3 April 2021) was a Ugandan Catholic prelate who served as Archbishop of Kampala from 2006 until his death in 2021. From 1996 to 2006, he served as Bishop of Kasana–Luweero.

== Background and education ==
Lwanga was born on 19 January 1953 at Kyabakadde Village, in Naggalama Parish, in present-day Mukono District in the Buganda Region of Uganda, within the Diocese of Lugazi.

Lwanga attended Kyabakadde Primary School. He entered Nyenga Seminary in 1964. Between 1972 and 1974, he studied Philosophy at Katigondo National Major Seminary, in present-day Kalungu District. He then studied Theology at Ggaba National Major Seminary, in Kampala. In 1979, he joined the University of Clermont-Ferrand in France, where he studied administration and languages, with particular emphasis on administration. Later, he studied at Pontifical University of the Holy Cross in Rome, where in 1994, he earned a doctorate in Canon Law.

== Priest ==
Lwanga was ordained a priest on 8 April 1978 at Rubaga Cathedral by Cardinal Emmanuel Kiwanuka Nsubuga. He served as a priest of Kampala Archdiocese until 30 November 1996.

== Bishop ==
Lwanga was appointed first bishop of the Diocese of Kasana-Luweero on 30 November 1996 and consecrated bishop on 1 March 1997 at Kasana-Luweero, by Cardinal Emmanuel Wamala, Archbishop of Kampala, assisted by Bishop Joseph Bernard Louis Willigers, Bishop of Jinja and Bishop Paul Lokiru Kalanda, Bishop of Fort Portal.

On 19 August 2006, Lwanga was appointed the third Archbishop of the Archdiocese of Kampala and was installed as the third Archbishop of Kampala on 30 September 2006 at Rubaga Cathedral, succeeding Cardinal Emmanuel Wamala, who retired.

On 2 February 2020, Lwanga issued a decree that Catholics in the archdiocese of Kampala could only receive Holy Communion on the tongue and not on the hand.

== Death ==
In his last public appearance on Good Friday 2 April 2021 during the way of the cross he criticized the violations of human rights in Uganda, fueling rumors of him being poisoned. Lwanga was found dead in his house on 3 April 2021. Before and after the elections of 14 January 2021, Lwanga had repeatedly expressed fear of being killed.

An autopsy was carried out by four senior pathologists on Monday, 5 April 2021, at Mulago National Referral Hospital, in the presence of two family representatives and two physicians/surgeons appointed by the Catholic Church. The conclusion of that post-mortem was that Archbishop Lwanga died from sudden total blockage of one of his coronary arteries. He had long-standing partial occlusion of his heart vessels (ischemic heart disease). When a blood clot suddenly formed in one of his heart vessels, it cut off blood supply to his heart muscle causing the heart muscle to die (myocardial infarction), or heart attack. This usually leads to death within "three to five minutes".

After requiem masses at Lubaga Cathedral, at Kyabakadde Village, where he was born and at the Basilica of the Uganda Martyrs, Namugongo, his body was buried inside Lubaga Cathedral between the remains of Joseph Nakabaale Kiwanuka, who was Archbishop of Rubaga and those of Bishop Joseph Georges Edouard Michaud, M. Afr., who was Vicar Apostolic of Uganda.

== See also ==
- Joseph Kiwanuka
- Uganda Martyrs
- Roman Catholicism in Uganda

Catholic Church titles
New diocese	Bishop of Kasana–Luweero; 1996–2006	Succeeded by Paul Ssemogerere
Preceded by Emmanuel Wamala	Archbishop of Kampala; 2006–2021	Succeeded by Paul Ssemogerere
