= Kisubi Mapeera Secondary School =

Location
- Kisubi, Wakiso District; Uganda; 0.12278°N 32.53635°E

Information
- Type: Private middle school and high school (8-13)
- Motto: Education is Liberation
- Religious affiliation: Catholic Church
- Established: 1999
- Founder: Fr.Mulumba Charles
- Enrollment: 1,000+ (2010)
- Houses: 4
- Colours: White and Blue
- Athletics: Soccer, rugby, track, volleyball and basketball
- Nickname: Mapeera
- Rivals: St. Mary's College Kisubi, King's College Budo
- Alumni: Mapeerans

Kisubi Mapeera Secondary School is a secondary school in Kampala, Uganda. It is currently headed by Rev. Father Benedict Kaweesa. The school gets its name from a tent peg which the missionary, Père Simon Lourdel M.Afr. (known as Fr. Mapera) turned into a tree. "Mapeera" is the Baganda rendition of "Mon Pere". It has recently celebrated its 26th anniversary on October 9, 2025.

The school was founded in 1999 as a Catholic private school, owned by the Kampala Archdiocese. From the original three teachers and eight students the school has grown in size top become a community with over 1,000 students with its current headmaster known as Damulira Joseph. The school is located along Entebbe road Kawuku stage and it is a mixed school both O' level and A' level.

== See also ==
- St. Joseph's College Layibi
- St. Joseph's College, Ombaci
- St. Kaggwa Bushenyi High School
- Kampala International School
- Kibuli Secondary School
