= The White Fathers Mission in Uganda =

Mission of the white fathers in Uganda

The pioneer White Fathers were affiliated to the Catholic Missionary Society of White Fathers which is also known as Religious Institute of the Missionaries of Africa. They arrived in Algiers in February 1874. They started their journey to Equatorial Africa (victoria Nyanza region) on 15 November 1878. They spent 10 months on their journey in which 2 months were spent in a boat from Algiers to Bagamoyo and the other 8 months on foot from Bagamoyo to Kigungu.

== Arrival and journey of the Missionaries of Africa in Uganda ==
In the search of the source of River Nile in the "Dark continent of Africa", Henry Morton Stanley arrived at Kabaka Muteesa I of Buganda who gave him letter in 1875 inviting the missionaries to come and educate his people. Muteesa I's letter was published in the British Times newspaper in London and missionaries came.

After the arrival of the first Christian missionaries that were sent by the Church Missionary Society (CMS) of England were British ex-service men, Lt. Shergold Smith and Rev. C.T Wilson on 30 June 1877.

The Catholic missionary society of White Fathers also known as Religious Institute of the Missionaries of Africa sent a group of ten missionaries to go to Equatorial Africa under the leadership of Léon Livinhac. They arrived in Zanzibar on 30 May 1878. The missionaries included Pere Siméon Lourdel Marpel (often misspelt as Simon Laurdel Mapeera) who was also aka Mapeera, Brother Delmas Amans (aka Amansi), Léone Livinhac, Ludovic Girault and Léon Barbot. On 15 November 1878, they started their journey to the Victoria Nyanza region.

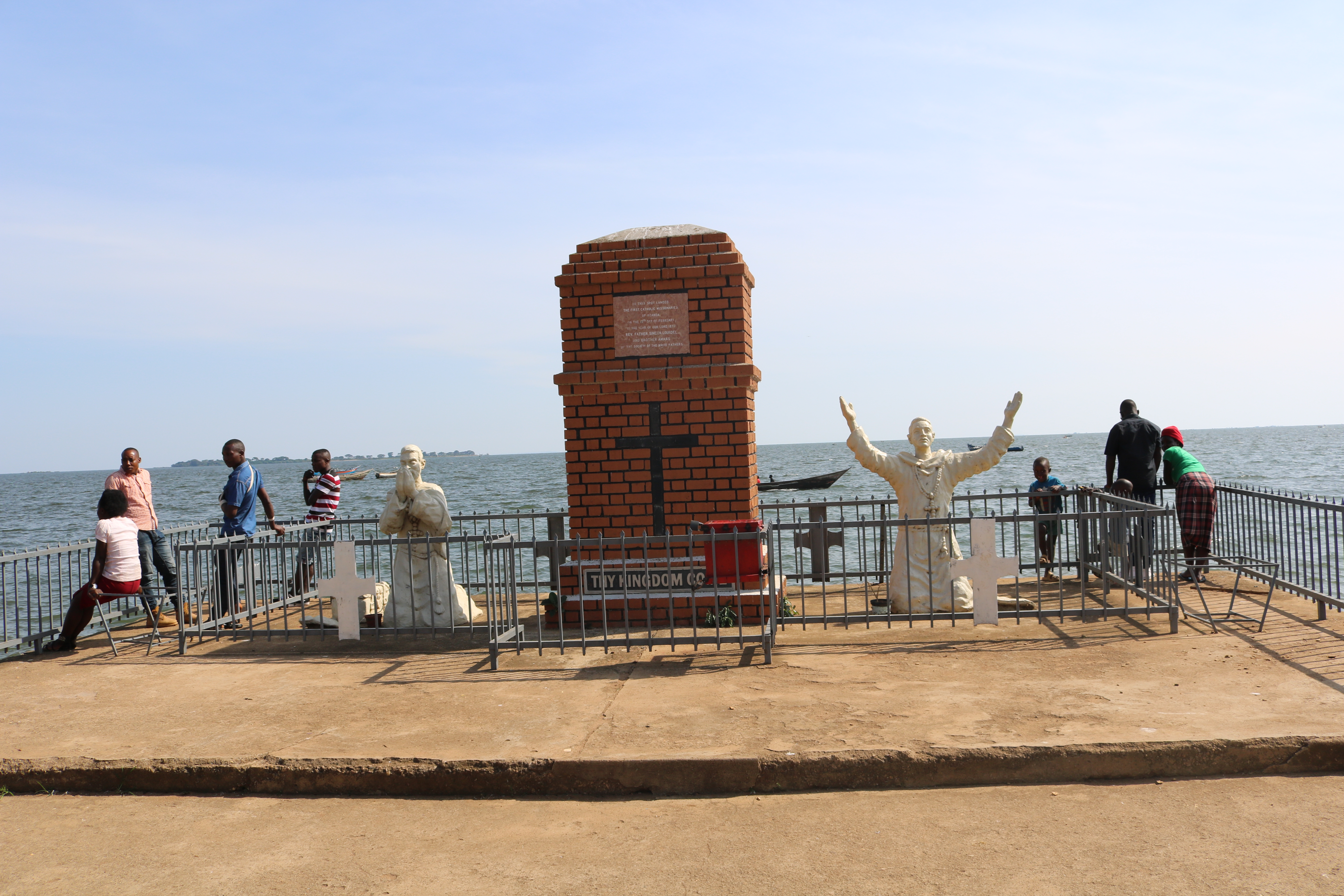
Fr. Mapeera (on the left) and Amansi (on the right) monument was constructed by the Missionaries for Africa.

The first two the catholic missionaries from the Society of Missionaries of Africa to arrive in Uganda were Pere Siméon Lourdel Marpel (aka Mapeera) and brother Delmas Amans (aka Amansi).

Charles Lavigerie wrote letters that were meant to stop Fr. Mapeera and brother Amansi from continuing to Uganda after he had gotten information about the murder of two Anglican missionaries on the Ukerewe island. But the letter reached Fr. Mapeera and brother Amansi in late September 1879 when they had already arrived in Buganda. Fr. Mapeera and Brother Amansi arrived in Buganda on Lake Victoria on 30 December 1878.

On 20 January 1879, Fr. Mapeera and Bro. Amansi started their lake journey after buying a boat (canoe) and also hiring five guards and 8 eight Oarsmen. They wanted to go and discuss with Kabaka Muteesa I before the rest of the fathers could join them. They set off at Kageye on the shores of Lake Victoria and they kept closer to the shoreline so that they could buy food when there was a need for it and also to be able to sleep in their tents at night.

On 15 February 1879, Fr. Mapeera and Brother Amansi arrived at Bugoma on Ssese Islands in Entebbe. They made a stop over at Bugoma Mapeera pilgrimage site also known as Bugoma Catholic site which is located in Bumangi catholic parish before heading for Kigungu landing site.

On 17 February 1879, Mapeera and Amansi arrived at Kigungu landing site in Entebbe Municipality where a monument that was constructed by the Missionaries of Africa to honor their memory and works was installed.

On 19 February 1879, they wanted to continue up to Mutungo near the palace of Kabaka Muteesa I but their boat was in bad shape and it later wrecked near Kaweta landing site at Bugonga in Entebbe.

After a month of their arrival (Fr. Mapeera and Brother Amansi), they erected a tent which served as a catholic church in Uganda at Nabulagala near Kasubi.

== Meeting the Kabaka ==
On 21 February 1879, the late Amir Sekikkubo a Ugandan Muslim welcomed and hosted Fr. Mapeera and Brother Amansi into his home in Kitebi. He promised to take them to Kabaka Muteesa I's palace the following day to Rubaga. On 22 February 1879, Sekikkubo took them to the palace but he was beaten by the Kabaka's guards (aka Abambowa) as they suspected that he had come to attack the Kabaka until the Katikkiro Kayiira saved him after him explaining why the visitors (Fr. Mapeera and Brother Amansi) had come to meet the Kabaka.

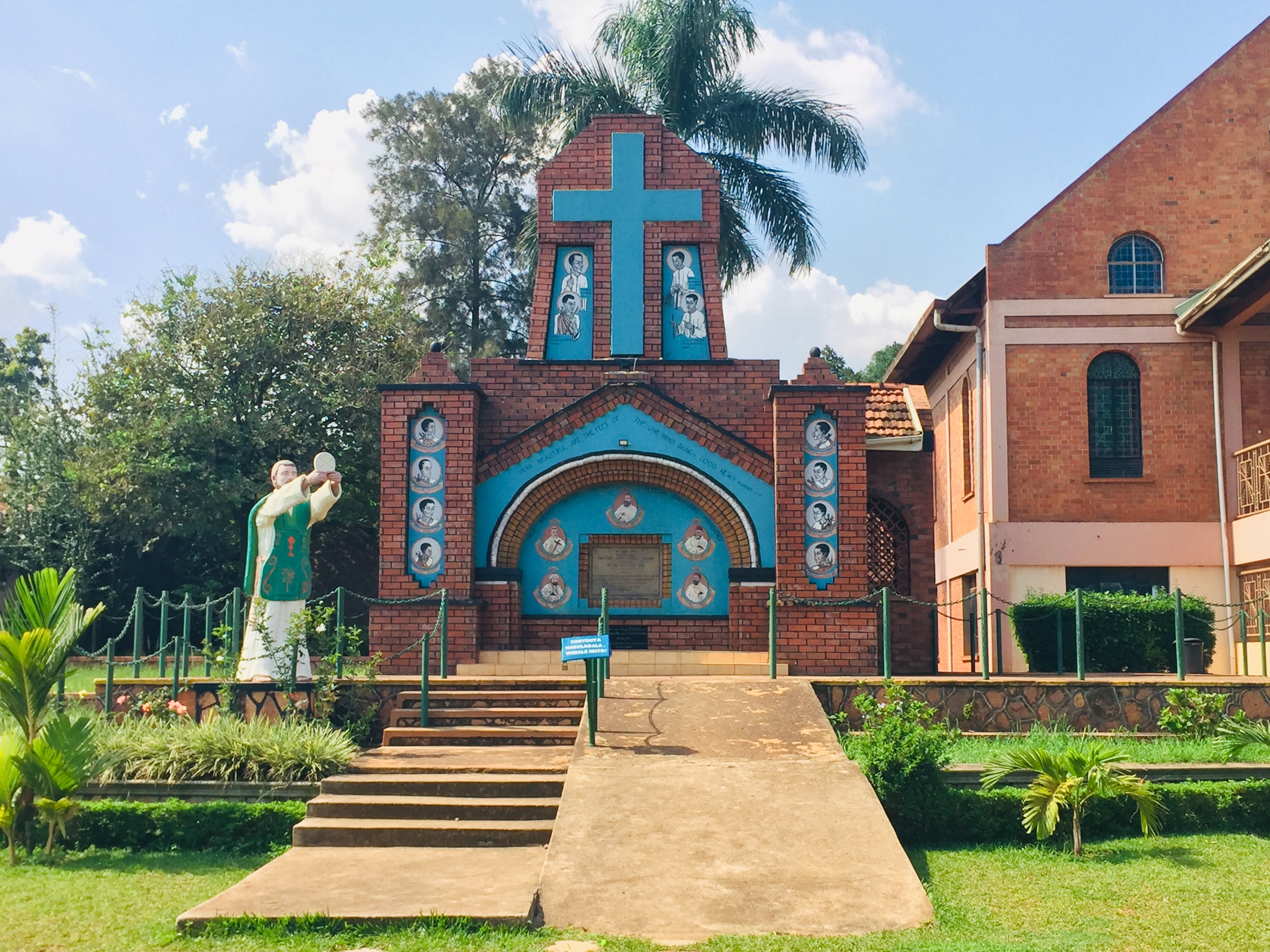
Mapeera Church - First Catholic Church in Uganda

Sekikkubo informed the Kabaka Muteesa I's about the visitors and the Kabaka instructed him to keep the visitors for 15 days until the Lukiiko decided their fate. Sekikkubo constructed for them a hut for Fr. Mapeera and Brother Amansi until they met Kabaka Muteesa I who offered Fr. Mapeera and Brother Amansi land of about two miles in Nabulagala on which they constructed a catholic church in Kitebe Village in Rubaga Division. When Fr. Simeon Lourdel met Kabaka Muteesa I in March 1879, he was given a name "Mapeera" which means Guava after hearing the French words "Mon Pere" which means "my father". Kabaka Muteesa I also named Fr. Mapeera "Mwana w'embuga" which is translated as "Son of the palace". Kabaka Muteesa I gave Rubaga hill to the catholic church of Uganda to be her headquarters and he moved his palace from Rubaga to Kasubi where he was laid to rest after his death on 10 October 1884. The altar of the Rubaga Cathedral was built in the place were Muteesa I's palace was located. After the meeting with Fr. Mapeera and Brother Amansi, the kabaka promised to send canoes to bring the rest of the White Fathers to Buganda. On 11 April 1879, the Kabaka Muteesa I gave Brother Amansi a fleet of 24 canoes to go and fetch the other missionaries who included: Léon Livinhac, Ludovic Girault and Léon Barbot.

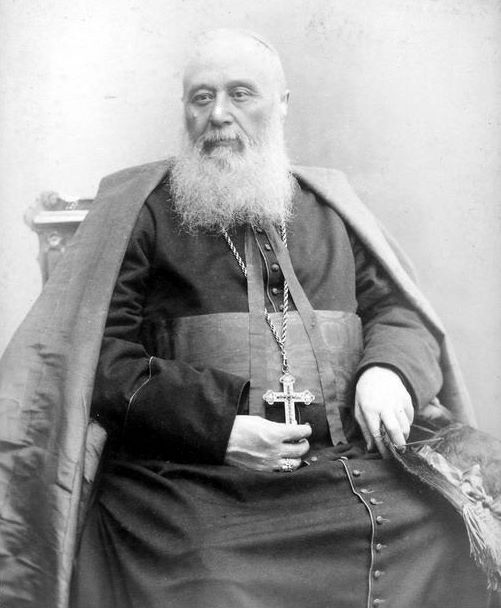
Charles Lavigerie

Charles Lavigerie ordered the Fr. Mapeera and Brother Amansi to set up a mission station twenty-five kilometres from the Protestants.

Kabaka Muteesa I's request for baptism was denied by Fr. Mapeera because of the Kabaka was Polygamous man, a decision that was rebuked by Charles Lavigere who mentioned that the Kabaka should have been admitted by the catechumen regardless of his marital status.

Kabaka Muteesa I did not want Luganda to be taught to the Missionaries but Fr. Mapeera was already writing a Luganda dictionary. He also wrote a catholic catechism and also Sunday gospel readings in Luganda.

== Treating the dysentry of Kabaka Muteesa I ==
At the end of 1879, Kabaka Muteesa I was in favour of the traditional religion that tried to treat him of his dysentry but they did not succeed in curing him. But in May 1880, it was the assistance that Fr. Mapeera provided to Kabaka Muteesa I that cured him of his dysentry.

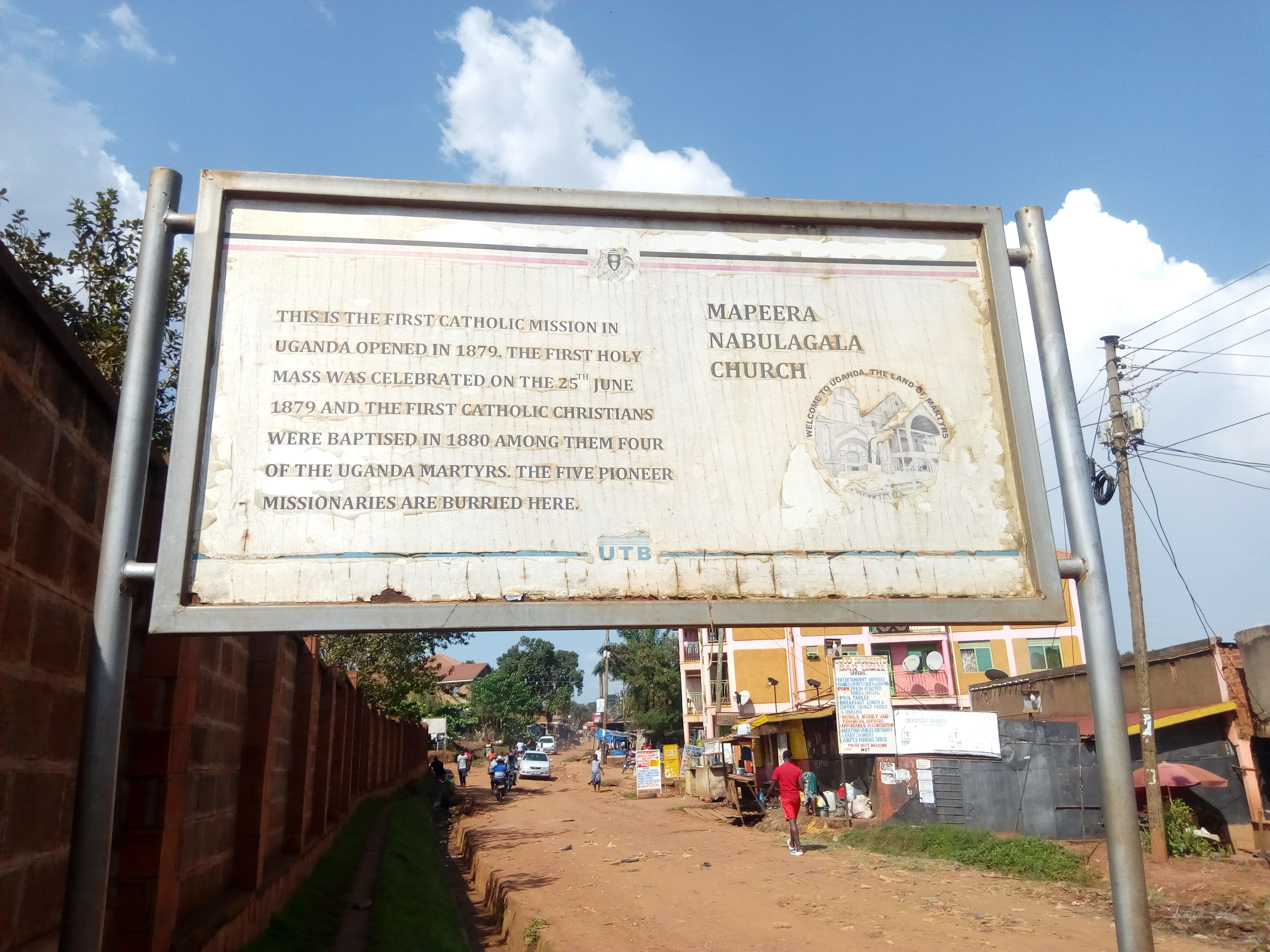
Mapeera Nabulagala church

== Freeing of slaves ==
After three months at Nabulagala, Fr. Mapeera and Brother Amansi negotiated, bought out the slaves from the Arab slave traders and redeemed them. They managed to save 28 children whom they called orphans. Those kids were kept in an orphanage in 1881.

In 1882, the white fathers had managed to free slaves most of which were not Baganda but they later discovered that some of the kids in the orphanage were practicing homosexuality. But the numbers of children kept on increasing every week but the white fathers were being limited by the resources to support.

== First Ugandan catholic mass celebration ==
The first ever catholic mass of the Latin rite mass was not celebrated in January because Fr. Mapeera and Brother Amansi had left the portable altar and books/articles that are used to celebrate a catholic mass in Kageye Village in Tanzania with a group of other missionaries. But those items were later brought by Msgr. Léon Livinhac, Pere Ludovic Girault and Léone Barbot on 24 June 1879 and celebrated mass on 25 June 1879 with Msgr. Léon Livinhac as the main celebrant at the Mapeera-Nabulagala Catholic Mission Station in Rubaga Division.

== Baptism of the first Ugandan Catholic converts ==
On the Easter Vigil of 28 March 1880, the first baptism of the Uganda Catholic converts was celebrated. Among those who were first baptised by Msgr. Léon Livinhac in Uganda included Paul Nalubandwa (aka Paolo Nlubanwa), Peter Kyonooneka Ddamulira (aka Petro Ddamulira), Joseph Lwanga (aka as Yosefu Lwanga) and Leon Kaddu. They also received their first holy communion and confirmation the next day. It was also the first Easter celebration (mass) in which the locals participated and the catholic mass was held in the night so that the attendees could not be noticed and be persecuted by Kabaka Muteesa I of Buganda who was also known as Mukaabya.

Fr. Mapeera baptised Andrew Kaggwa and Joseph Mukasa Balikuddembe on 30 April 1882. Fr. Ludovic Girault baptised Mathias Mulumba and Lukka Baanabakintu on 28 May 1882. Local chiefs who include; Luka Banabakinti and Matia Kalemba were also baptised.

== The coming of the Mill Hill Missionaries ==
After Kabaka Mwanga realising that there was no catholism in England as the Church Missionary Society were from England while the White fathers came from France. The White fathers contacted the Mill Hill Mission in England to send in the British Catholic Fathers to remove Kabaka Mwanga's doubts. In 1895, Bishop Henry Hanlon from the Mill Hill Mission arrived in Uganda and he was given Nsambya Hill by Kabaka Mwanga. The Mill Hill missionaries spread Christianity in the Tooro region. Bishop Henry Hanlon did not only manage to convert Mugwanya from being a Moslem to being catholic but also made him the head of Catholics in Buganda. On Mugwanya's request, Bishop Hanlon built Namilyango College in 1902 that educated catholic princes from Buganda, Bunyoro, Tooro, Ankole, Busoga including Prince Joseph Musanje who painted the portrait of Kabaka Muteesa I. Hill Mill Fathers also built Tororo college in Eastern Uganda for the people of Bukedi, Bagisu and Teso.

=== Sister Mary Kevin ===
Sister Mary Kevin aka (Mother Kevina, Mama Kevina) was a Hill Mill missionary who arrived on 15 January 1903. She encouraged many Ugandan women to get baptised. She founded the Little sisters of St. Francis Nkokonjeru in Kyagwe in Mukono District in 1923. Mama Kevina built Nsambya Hospital, Stella Marris Nsube girls school, Nagalama Catholic Mission and hospital.

== Creation of more Vicariates ==
In 1894, the Victoria Vicariate that consisted of (Sudan, Uganda, Kenya, Rwanda, Burundi, Tanzania and Zaire) was split into three by Pope Leo XIII;

1. North Nyanza Vicariate (but it was renamed to Uganda Vicariate in 1915) and it was managed by the White Fathers.
  - In 1910, Northern Uganda was being managed by the Comboni Missionaries.
  - In 1934, the Rwenzori Vicariate that consisted of districts in western Uganda was created from the Uganda Vicariate. In 1993 Mbarara was made a province, comprising Kabale, Fort portal, Kasese, Hoima dioceses.
  - In 1939, the Masaka Vicariate was created from the Uganda Vicariate.
  - On 25 March 1953, all the Vicariate became dioceses. And also the Rubaga Archdiocese that consisted of the (Gulu, Masaka, Kampala, Mbarara and Tororo) dioceses was created.
  - In 1958, the Holy Cross Fathers started spreading Christianity in western Uganda.
2. Upper Nile Vicariate that was managed by the Mill Hill Missionaries.
3. South Nyanza Vicariate

== Catholic church of Uganda after the White Fathers ==
=== Electing of the leader of christians ===
Due to persecutions between 1882 and 1888, the missionaries held a secret ballot election on whether they should abandon the Buganda mission station or stay, most them of they voted to leave. On 8 November 1882, the missionaries left Uganda for Tanzania by sailing to the southern shore of Lake Victoria Nyanza and left behind 20 baptised Christians and more than 300 catechumens.

The few baptised Catholics and catechumens met and discussed on how to run the church after the white fathers left Uganda. During the first Synod, Joseph Mukasa Balikuddembe was elected as the leader of Christians in November 1882.

=== The return of the White Fathers ===
Fr. Mapeera and other missions spent three years out of Uganda and this forced the orphans to split into two groups where one of the groups formed the orphanage and mission of Kamoga in Bukumbi (near Mwaza Town in Tanzania). The second group moved to an orphanage that was in existence in Kipalapala near Tabola.

Fr. Mapeera came back to Nyanza after the creation of Vicariate of Nyanza with its first Bishop as Léon Livinhac. After the death of Kabaka Muteesa I and the succession of Kabaka Mwanga who was a friendly to the catholic missionaries in October 1884, Fr. Mapeera left the mission of Bukune for Buganda in March 1885 after its closure. On 12 July 1885, Fr. Mapeera and the other missionaries were received in Buganda after a team 300 oarsmen and canoes was by Kabaka Mwanga to fetch them. Fr. Mapeera and other missionaries were given a place in Nalukolongo near Rubaga royal palace. On his return, Fr. Mapeera found that other catholic converts had been baptised including Princess Nalumansi (a daughter of Kabaka Muteesa I) and local village chiefs.

In 1888, the Catholics in Buganda re-grouped in Buddu and also in Ankole kingdom. Both the Catholics and Protestants united to support the restoration of the earlier overthrown and exiled Kabaka Mwanga the united forces of the new religions in April 1888 back to the Buganda throne in October 1889 as a means of restoring peace in Buganda. Mwanga sought refuge in Bukumbi with the White Fathers.

=== Inauguration into a parish ===
Nabulagala was a sub-parish of greater Naakulabye prior 2006. On 24 June 2007, cardinal Emmanuel Wamala elevated it into a parish and named it St. John the Baptist Mapeera Nabulagala Catholic parish. The parish is being manned by the White Fathers and was inaugurated in 2007. Its first parish priest was Fr. Richard Nnyombi (a senior member of the white fathers).

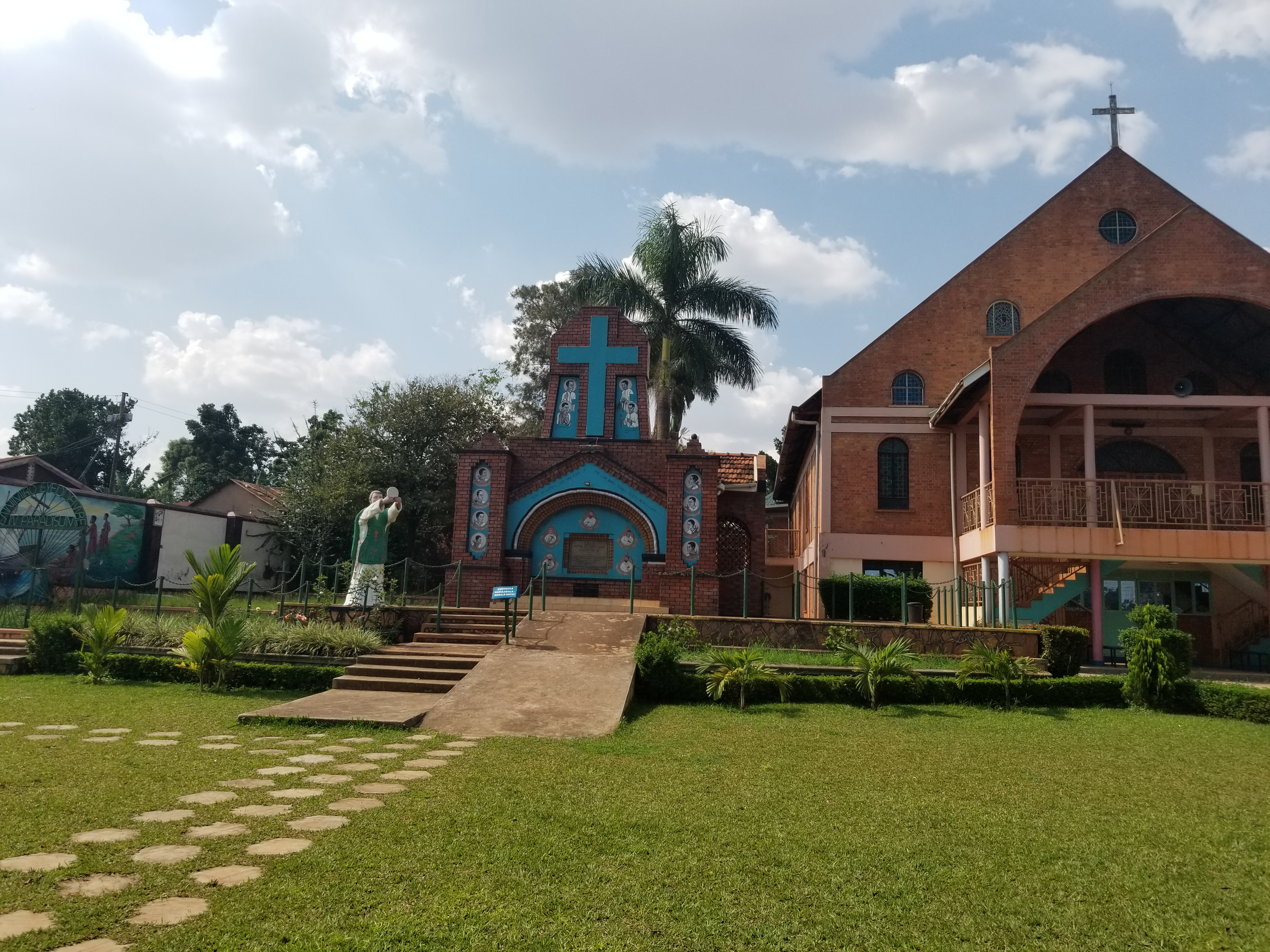
Nabulagala Mapeera church in Lusaze Lubya

=== Construction of a bigger church ===
St. John the Baptist, Mapeera-Nabulagala church with a capacity of 1000 members was constructed in Rubaga Division using the contributions from the White Fathers and Catholics in Uganda and diaspora at the same spot where Mapeera and Amansi built their first mission station. It was consecrated by Dr. Cyprian Kizito Lwanga on 25 June 2016.

=== A letter from Vatican ===
In 1972, a letter from Vatican was delivered by the late cardinal Emmanuel Nsubuga who the Archbishop of Kampala at that time to family of the late Amir Sekikkubo. A petition of opposing a Muslim owned land hosting kaffirs was submitted by the Muslims of Kiswayili zone to Idi Amin when Musa Kaggwa Senyondwa, the son of late Amir Sekikkubo, requested Archbishop to construct a catholic church on the land he inherited from his late father as a way of honouring his father who played a role in the starting up of the Catholic Church in Uganda. Idi Amin intervened by visiting the home of the late Sekikkubo but the church was built.

In February 1978, Kijukizo Kya Mapeera Catholic Sub-parish church was created. Namutebi Nusura (a granddaughter of the late Amir Sekikkubo) added the first mass celebration. On 21 February of every year, a catholic mass is celebrated at the home of the late Amir Sekikkubo and also the Duwa (Muslims prayers) are held on the same day and in that same pulpit.

=== Construction of the church and a mosque ===
In 1980, Cardinal Emmanuel Nsubuga built a mosque to honor Amir Sekikkubo selflessness towards the growth of the Catholic church in Uganda.

=== The formation of Catholic Charismatic Renewal (CCR) ===
In 1973, Fr. Roger LaBonte, introduced CCR in Mbarara in Uganda.

=== Pilgrimage ===
Many pilgrims visit Kigungu at Mapeera church every 17 February every year to commemorate the arrival of Christianity in Uganda and celebrate the anniversary of Catholic faith in Uganda. A great-great-grandniece of Father Mapeera called Marlene Marie Lee visited Uganda for her first time in 2017 with other fellow parishioners who included Jim and Gina Nailon. And they were Fr. Luke Ssemakula.

=== Mapeera-Nabunnya Pilgrimage centre ===
Christians are encourage to donate money towards the development of the Mapeera-Nabunnya pilgrimage centre and also the beautification process of the Mapeera.

=== Catholic hymn about Mapeera and Amansi ===
A hymn titled "Amansi ne Mapeera" was written, composed and is sung in most Catholic churches in Uganda especially in Buganda. The hymn is about the history of Mapeera and Amansi and the works they did for the Catholic church of Uganda which included teaching people and also healing the sick in a village called Rubya in Kyaddondo.

== Institutions founded by the White fathers ==
The white fathers built schools which include;

- St. Henry's College Kitovu.
- Rubaga High school.
- St. Mary's college Kisubi
- Rubaga Hospital.
- St Mary's Cathedral Lubaga commonly known as Rubaga Cathedral.
- Villa Maria proto-cathedral in Kalungu District.
- St. Francis Xavier's Villa Maria Primary School, founded in 1895.
- Bwanda Convent in Kalungu District (by Archbishop Henry Streicher)
- Holy Family minor seminary Bukalasa in Kalungu District, on 9 June 1893.
- Katigondo Grand Major seminary in Kalungu district on 7 March 1911.
- Bukalasa Minor Seminary.
- St. Mary's college Kisubi (SMACK) on 12 May 1924 formerly it was St. Mary's School Rubaga which was both a primary and junior school in 1906.
- Kisubi Hospital (was built by the White Sisters).
- Kitebi-Bunnamwaya (where Fr. Mapeera and Brother Amansi where housed by Amir Ssekikubo)
- St. Joseph Technical Institute Kisubi in 1911.
- Uganda martyrs high school Rubaga.
- Rubaga Boys Junior school (which gave birth to Rubaga Boys primary school and Rubaga Boys secondary school).

== Life, works, and death of the five pioneer White Fathers in Uganda ==
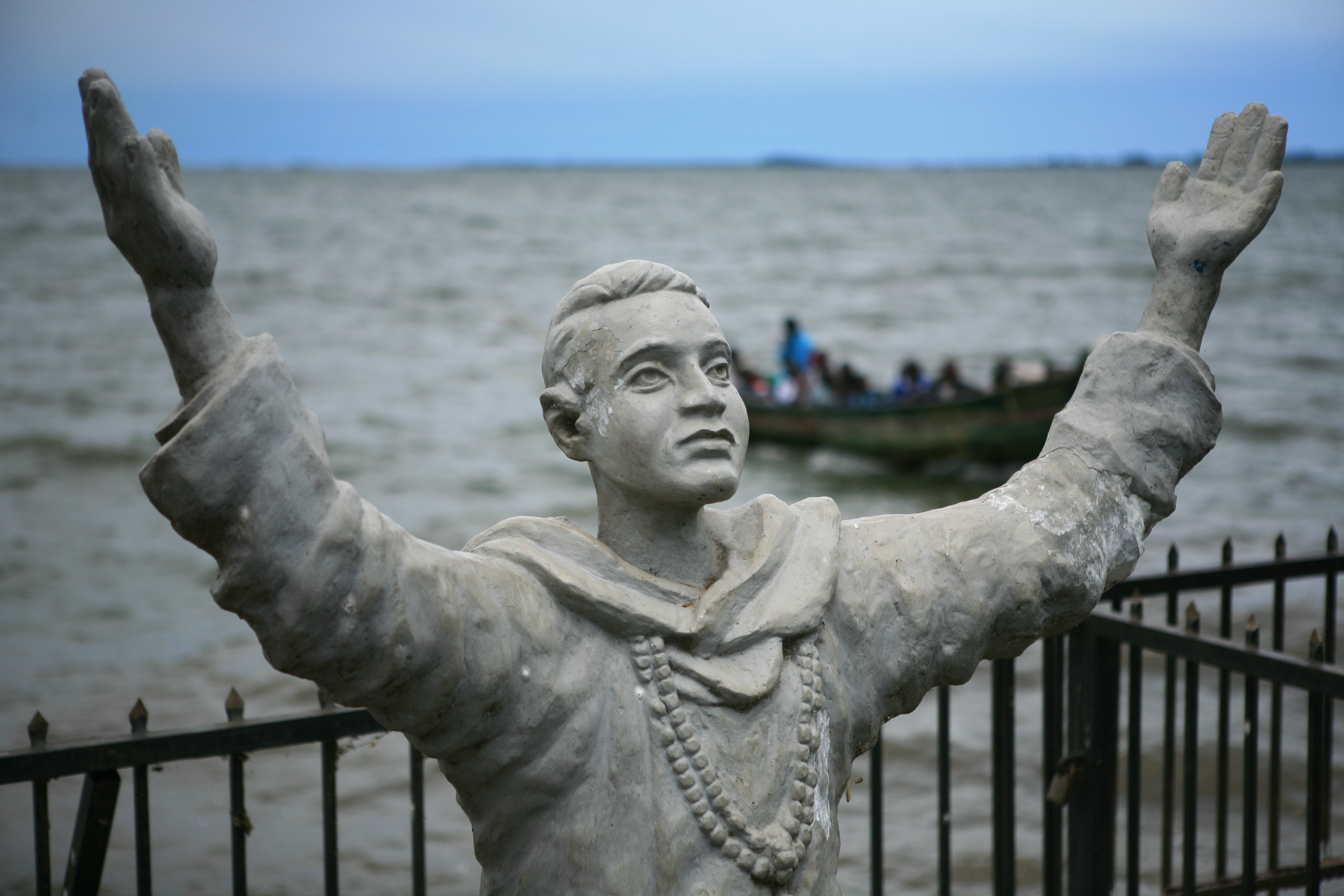
Statue of Fr. Pere Siméon Lourdel Marpel (aka Mapeera) at Mapeera Nabulagala Church

The late cardinal Nsubuga exhumed the remains of the five pioneer missionaries in Uganda from Bagamoyo and Rubaga cemeteries and kept them in a secret place until it was resolved by the Catholic church in Uganda to re-bury them.

=== Mapeera (1853 to 1890) ===
Pere Siméon Lourdel Marpel aka Mapeera arrived in Uganda when he was 25 years old. He moved with Dallington Scorpion Mafta who was his monitor of language. He served as the Superior of Rubaga Mission and also as the personal advisor of Kabaka Mwanga during his stay at Nalukolongo. Fr. Mapeera tried to unite the Catholics, traditionalists and Protestants to share power.

Mapeera (Pere Siméon Lourdel Marpel) at the age of 37 died at 1:10 PM of 12 May 1890 at Rubaga due to Hepatitis and he was surrounded by Fr. Camille Denoit, Fr. Alphose Brard. As written in the diary of Rubaga Mission by his Vicar Apostolic (Fr. Brard or Fr.Denoit). Mapeera was buried in three different places at different times.And these are;

- Nabunnya where the Mapeera Pilgrimage Centre is located.
- Mapeera's remains were later exhumed, transferred and buried at Rubaga Cathedral.
- Mapeera's remains together with the remains of the other pioneer missionaries in Uganda were exhumed, displayed for public viewing and re-buried at St. John the Baptist Catholic parish, Mapeera, Nabulagala on 6 March 2011. The Papal Ambasasador to Uganda, Archbishop Paul Tschang In-Nam was present at the function which was held at Brother Amansi Mapeera church.

He witnessed the capture of 16 of his catholic converts on 26 May 1886 and 10 Anglican converts who had disobied the orders of Kabaka Mwanga and their match to Namugongo.

The Uganda Catholic church commemorates the death anniversary of Fr. Mapeera and a memorial mass is always celebrated.

=== Léon Livinhac (1846 - 1922) ===
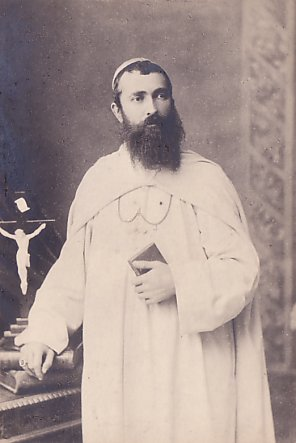
Leon Livinhac in 1885

Léon Livinhac was the leader of the pioneer White fathers that came to Uganda. In 1884, he was ordained and became the first catholic Bishop in Uganda. Léon died on 12 December 1922 and his remains were buried in the shrine of Nabugala in Uganda on 24 June 2007. But his remains were exhumed and buried at St. John the Baptist Catholic parish, Mapeera, Nabulagala on 6 March 2011.

- A centennial year of Léon Livinhac's death was launched on 11 November 2021 by the Archbishop Augustine Kasujja (Apostolic Nuncio Emeritus to Belgium) at St. John the Baptist Catholic church, Mapeera-Nabulagala.
- In 1885, Bishop Léon Livinhac is also remembered for publishing the first Luganda grammar book that was printed in Algiers. The book made it easier for other fathers to learn Luganda . But the manuscript that contained 6,000 Luganda words got lost in a ship wreck off the French coast in 1886.
- He was also witnessed the deaths of the Uganda Marytrs who had refused to obey the orders of Kabaka Mwanga.
- He also took with him 14 young Baganda to attend the Anti-slavery Congress on 19 September 1890 and also to visit he Vatican.
- In May 1886, he brought with him a small printing press.

=== Amans Delmas (aka Amansi) (1852 - 1895) ===
Amansi arrived in Uganda at the age of 27 and he had not yet made his final vows that would make him a reverend father. He was a lay brother with the Society of Missionaries for Africa. He made those vows in October 1879.

On his way back to Europe, Amansi died after two hours on his arrival at the mission of the Spiritain fathers in Bagamoyo on 18 January 1895 as indicated in the diary of Zanzibar. He was buried in the mission cemetery at Bagamoyo. In March 1974, his remains where exhumed and imported back to Uganda. He was added to the list of those to be beautified by Cyprian Kizito Lwanga.

Amansi was key in finding of the mission in Bukumbi in 1883. He also served in Kooki, Willa Mara and Marieberg in between 1892 and 1984.

=== Fr. Ludovic Girault (1853 - 1941) ===
Girault arrived in Uganda on 17 June 1879 after he brother Amansi went back for him. and he died on 17 February 1941.

He baptised Mathias Mulumba Kalemba and Lukka Baanabakintu on 28 May 1882, and Local chiefs who included Luka Banabakinti and Matia Kalemba.

As a newly consecrated Bishop, Girault on 29 June 1913 at Villa Maria parish, he ordained Fr. Basil Lumu and Msgr Victor Mukasa Wameraka.

=== Fr. Léon Barbot (1846 - 1882) ===
Source:

== Mapeera and Amansi's beautification and canonisation into saints ==
The canonization of the Uganda martyrs has been debated on by people including priests including the late Joe Van de Ven Ssajjalyabeene aka Fr. Miiro Sajja Lyabene (also misspelt as Miilo) of Nabulagala who asked "Can a student know better than his teacher?" where he was inquiring whether the students (the Uganda Marytrs) where better than his teacher (Fr. Mapeera).

Mapeera's beatification process was started by Bishop Joseph Mukwaya but when he died, the task was launched in 1987 by Cardinal Emmanuel Nsubuga. And after Nsubuga's death, Fr. Benedict Ssebulege took charge over Mapeera's beautification process. Fr. Benedict Ssebulege worked with an appointed committee that included; Messenger David Kyeyune, Fr. Nyombi, Fr. John Ssajjalyabene, late Fr. Emmanuel Kimbowa, Fr. Joseph Sserugga, Fr, Charles Ssengendo and Fr. Joseph Mukasa Muwonge. The committee documented the virtues of Mapeera and Amans and the pope approved their documented file and tasked the Kampala Archidiocese to register all the miracles that were achieved by Christians through the intercession of Mapeera and Amans.

Cyprian Kizito Lwanga re-inititated the Mapeera's canonisation that had been silent for a while and he also added Brother Delmas Amans on the list for those to be canonised as saints in January 2010 and a new committee called The Kampala Archdiocesan for the beatification of Fr. Mapeera and Brother Amans was appointed and were to hold their sessions at Mapeera-Nabunnya Pilgrimage Centre in Rubaga.

During a church mass celebration for opening the beautification of Mapeera and Amansi that was held at St Mary's Cathedral, Rubaga, the main celebrant was Rev. Brother Cruz (a delegate from the Vatican Congregation for causes of Saints). The gathered and documentary proofs about the Servants of God (Father Mapeera, Brother Amansi and Maama Kevina) were presented and a tribunal to do further investigations, inquiries and research about the life, heroic virtues and miracles was formed and they made an oath.

The appointed tribunal included;

- Postulator: Dr. Waldery Hilgemam
- Vice-postulator: Fr. Ricard Nnyombi
- Episcopal delegate (representative of Archbishop Lwanga) - Fr. Dr. Joseph Sserunjoji
- Promoter of Justice: Fr. Dr. Andrew Kato (Apostes of Jesus).
- Notary: Fr. Aloysius Bwangatto.
- Adjunct Notary: Fr. Paul Gyaviira Muwanga.

The documentation process was completed in Uganda and sent to the Vatican Congregation for causes of Saints for verification and scrutiny.

== More in the news ==
Masaka Diocese mobilised Catholics to contribute towards the development of Bugoma Catholic site where Fr. Mapeera and Brother Amansi made a stop over before arriving at Kigungu landing site into a tourism site. The site is located in Bumangi catholic Parish.

== External references ==
- Book: "The Catholic Church in the Buddu Province of Buganda, 1879-1925" by Fr. John Mary Waligo.
- Book: "The British mission to Uganda in 1893" by Portal, Gerald Herbert, Sir, 1858–1894; Portal, Raymond Melville, 1856–1893; Rodd, Rennell, 1858-1941
- Book: "The Beginning of the White Fathers Mission in Southern Uganda and the Organisation of the Catechumenate From 1879-1914" by Marinus Rooijackers. It was published by the Society of the Missionaries of Africa.
- Book: Growth and Crisis of Buganda Monarchy in the Nineteenth Century by Médard. Hastings
- Webpage: Death of Father Lourdel (1853-1890) Missionary of Africa (White Father ) Apostle to the Baganda
- Webpage: ArchBishop Livinhac (1846-1922)
- Book titled: 'Vie du révérend Père Siméon Lourdel de la Congrégation des Pères Blancs de Notre-Dame d'Afrique : premier missionnaire catholique de l'Ouganda (Afrique équatoriale)' - by Canon Nicq, published in Paris 1896.

== See also ==
- Uganda Martyrs
- Uganda Martyrs Shrine
- Léon Livinhac
- Catholic Church in Uganda
