= Katigondo National Major Seminary =

Ugandan Catholic institution

Saint Thomas Aquinas National Major Seminary Katigondo
- Type: Private, Seminary
- Established: January 1, 1911
- Founder: Missionaries of Africa (White Fathers)
- Accreditation: Uganda Episcopal Conference; Uganda National Council for Higher Education
- Affiliations: White Fathers
- Religious affiliation: Catholic
- Rector: Father David Ssenkaayi
- Students: 270
- Location: Villa Maria, Kalungu, Kalungu District, Uganda; 00°13′38″S 31°44′07″E
- Website: www.katigondoseminary.org
- Location in Uganda

Katigondo National Major Seminary, (also Saint Thomas Aquinas National Major Seminary Katigondo) is a National Seminary of the Catholic Church in Uganda. The institution is a training facility and House of Formation under the auspices of the Uganda Episcopal Conference (UEC). The institution is also accredited by the Uganda National Council for Higher Education to teach some non-religious academic courses.

== Location ==
The seminary is located in Villa Maria, a suburb of the municipality of Kalungu in Kalungu District in the Greater Masaka sub-region in the southwest of the Buganda Region in Uganda. This is approximately 16 kilometres (10 mi) northwest of the central business district of Masaka City.

== History ==
Katigondo Seminary was opened at the present location in 1911. In 1913, it graduated two Ugandan priests; Father Basil Lumu and Father Victor Mukasa Womeraka, the first sub-Saharan Africans to be ordained Catholic priests in the modern era. Over the first 100 years of existence, the seminary has trained 4,000 to 5,000 seminarians. Of these 1,900 were ordained priests, 29 were appointed bishops and at least three were created cardinals.

== Academics ==
The seminary is primarily a philosophical school, which instructs seminarians in philosophy before sending them to Ggaba National Major Seminary, in Ggaba, Kampala, where they study Theology and then are ordained priests. In addition to religious courses, the seminary in accredited by the Uganda National Council for Higher Education to provide non-religious courses, including the BSc in Business Accounting and Financial Management.

== Rectors ==
- Father David Ssenkaayi (since July 2023)
- Father Herman Kituuma (2011 until 2023)

In July 2023, Pope Francis appointed Father David Ssenkaayi to succeed Father Herman Kituuma, who had served as rector for over 12 years. Father Tamale Mugagga was appointed by the Uganda Episcopal Conference as the vice-rector.

== Alumni ==
Prominent alumni of Katigondo Major Seminary include the following.

- Bishop Joseph Kiwanuka, the first sub-Saharan African bishop. (Deceased)
- Cardinal Laurean Rugambwa, the first sub-Saharan African cardinal. (Deceased)
- Cardinal Emmanuel Kiwanuka Nsubuga, the first Ugandan cardinal (Deceased)
- Cardinal Emmanuel Wamala, the second Ugandan cardinal.
- Bishop John Baptist Kakubi, Bishop Emeritus of Mbarara, Uganda. (Deceased)
- Archbishop Cyprian Kizito Lwanga, Archbishop of Kampala (Deceased).
- Bishop Lawrence Mukasa, Bishop of Kasana-Luweero.
- Bishop Callistus Rubaramira, Bishop Emerittus of Kabale Diocese.
- Bishop Sabino Ocan Odoki. Bishop of Arua.
