= Munno =

Was a newspaper in Uganda

- Katonda ne Uganda Omwoyo Gumu n'emmeme emu
- Type: Daily newspaper
- Founder: White Fathers Mission in Uganda
- Publisher: Munno Publications Limited
- Editor-in-chief: Father Clement Kiggundu
- Deputy editor: John Serwaniko
- Founded: 1911
- Ceased publication: 1989
- Relaunched: 1972
- Language: Luganda
- Headquarters: Kisubi
- Country: Uganda
- OCLC number: 15606281

Munno (meaning "Friend") was a Luganda language daily newspaper that was established in 1911 and ceased publication in 1989. At the time of its closure in 1989, it was one of Uganda's oldest newspapers.

== History ==
Founded in 1911 by the White Fathers Mission in Uganda, Munno was a Catholic Luganda newspaper that reported on politics, business and sports in Uganda. It was published daily except on Sunday(s)

In the 1950s, Munno was noted for its engagement in partisan politics and "its support for the Democratic Party (DP), a party established to offer a platform for politically-engaged Catholics".

It was banned by President Idd Amin in 1976 and resumed publication in 1979.

== See also ==
- List of newspapers in Uganda
- Clement Kiggundu
