= Basilica of the Uganda Martyrs, Namugongo =

Catholic minor basilica dedicated to the Ugandan Martyrs

Basilica of the Uganda Martyrs
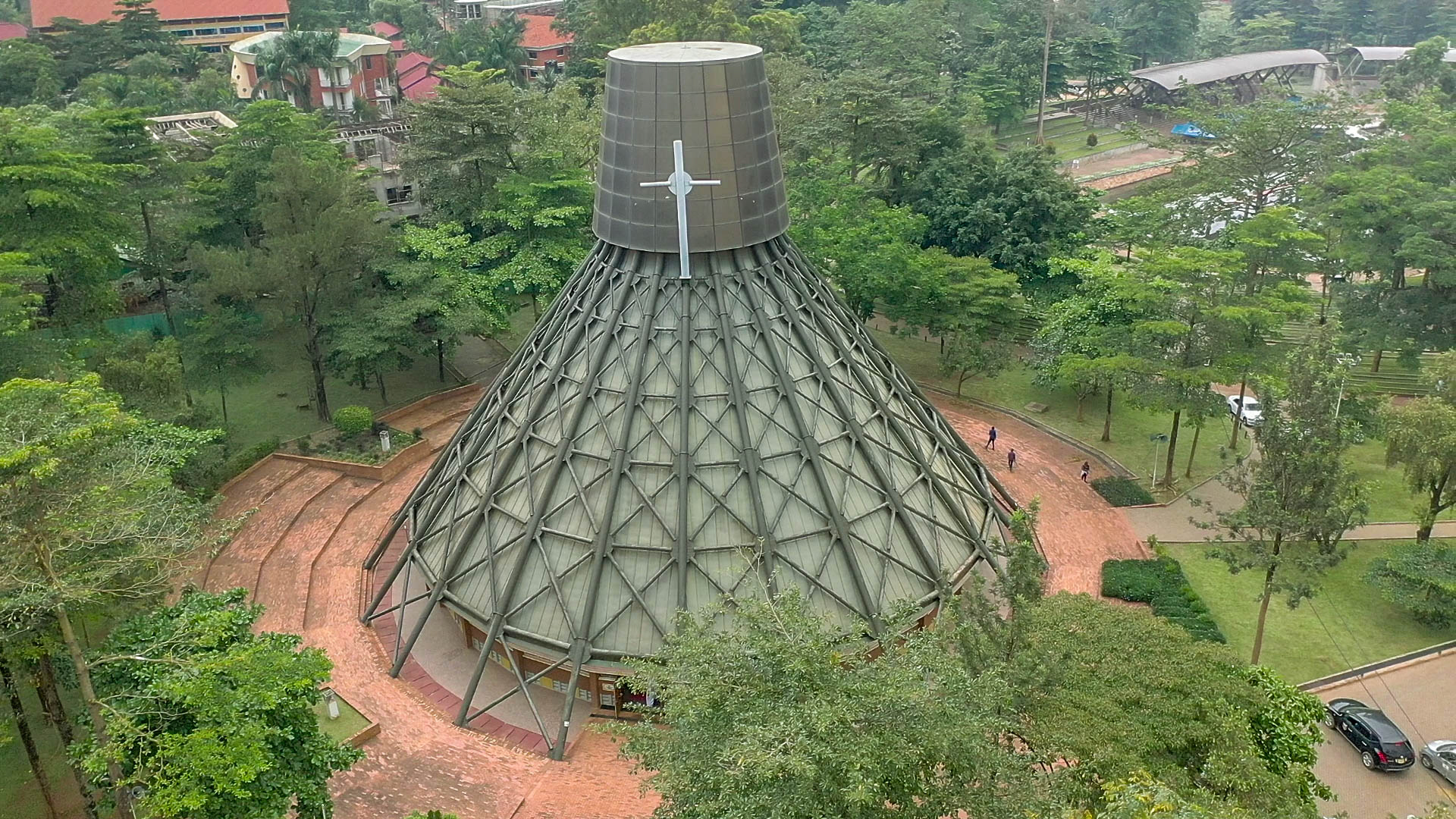
- Basilica of the Uganda Martyrs in 2023

Religion
- Affiliation: Roman Catholic
- Diocese: Archdiocese of Kampala
- Ecclesiastical or organisational status: Minor basilica
- Year consecrated: 1975

Location
- Location: Namugongo, Wakiso District, Uganda
- Interactive map of Basilica of the Uganda Martyrs
- Coordinates: 0°23′07″N 32°39′05″E

Architecture
- Groundbreaking: 1965
- Completed: 1968

Website
- Homepage

The Basilica of the Uganda Martyrs, Namugongo is a Latin Catholic minor basilica dedicated to the Ugandan Martyrs.

== Location ==
The basilica is located at Namugongo, Kira Municipality, Wakiso District, in Central Uganda. Namugongo Basilica is located approximately 17.5 kilometres (11 mi), by road, northeast of the central business district of Kampala, Uganda's capital and largest city in that East African country.

== History ==
The Namugongo Shrines were first recognised by the late Joshua Serufusa-Zake (1884–25 June 1985) when he was the Sabaddu of Kira Sub-County (1827–1928). Joshua Serufusa-Zake constructed a structure at the Namugongo site, where it appears shrines were built later for prayer.

His interest in Christianity was enhanced by his father's participation in the wars that brought Christianity to Uganda. Joshua Serufusa-Zake's father, Semei Musoke Seruma Katiginya had earned a name for brevity 'Ngubu' from the wars. It might be of interest to note that Joshua Serufusa-Zake was born in 1884, just a year before the killings of Uganda Martyrs started.

== Overview ==
Groundbreaking for the construction of the basilica was in 1965. Construction was completed in 1968. The basilica was decreed on 28 April 1993, and is administered by the Roman Catholic Archdiocese of Kampala. It is built close to the spot where Saint Charles Lwanga and Saint Kizito were burned to death in 1886 on the orders of Kabaka Mukasa Basammul'ekkere Mwanga II.

== Recent events ==
2014 marked fifty years since the Uganda Martyrs were canonized and elevated to Sainthood by Pope Paul VI on 18 October 1964. The occasion was marked by a memorial Mass at the Basilica and Pope Francis was expected to be the main celebrant. Although the Pope did not visit in 2014, he made the visit to Uganda in November 2015, and celebrated Mass outside the basilica at Namugongo, on Saturday 28 November 2015.

== See also ==
- Saint Mary's Cathedral Rubaga
- Roman Catholicism in Uganda
- Roman Catholic Archdiocese of Kampala
- Basilica of the Blessed Virgin Mary, Lodonga
- Munyonyo Martyrs Shrine
