= Paul Ssemogerere =

Paul Ssemogerere may refer to:

- Paul Ssemogerere (politician) (1932–2022), lawyer and politician in Uganda
- Paul Ssemogerere (bishop) (born 1956), Roman Catholic priest and bishop of the Roman Catholic Diocese of Kasana-Luweero
