= St. Kaggwa Bushenyi High School =

Government secondary school in Uganda

Location
- P.O. Box 84, Bushenyi, Uganda; Ward II Parish, Bushenyi TC Sub-county, Igara, Bushenyi District, Western Region, Uganda

Information
- Other name: Kagwa Bushenyi High School
- Type: Government-aided secondary school; boarding
- Motto: "We Labour for Our Future"
- Religious affiliation: Catholic
- Denomination: Roman Catholic
- Established: 1968 (founded by Mbarara Diocese)
- Founder: Mbarara Diocese
- Gender: Boys
- Age range: Secondary (S1–S6)
- Campus type: Rural
- Athletics: Football, basketball, etc.

Kagwa Bushenyi High School is a government-aided boys school located in Bushenyi District, Western Uganda. The school was founded in 1968 by the Mbarara Catholic Diocese and later received government aid in 1976. It is named after Saint Charles Lwanga (St. Kagwa), one of the Uganda Martyrs.

== History ==
St. Kagwa Bushenyi High School was established in 1968 under the leadership of Rev. Fr. Bruno Loiselle (RIP), a catholic missionary Diocese's efforts to expand access to secondary education in southwestern Uganda.

IN 1976, the Government of Uganda granted the school aided status, enabling state involvement in staff remuneration, policy guidance and school governance through appointed boards. Over the years, the school has developed with financial and administrative support from both the government and parents, particularly through the Parents-Teachers Association (PTA).

== Administration and governance ==
As a government-aided institution, St. Kagwa Bushenyi High School operates under Uganda's Ministry of Education and Sports. The government pays salaries for some teaching staff and appoints boards responsible for oversight and management. Parents contribute through school fees, which support recurrent expenditures and capital development projects.

== Co-curricular activities ==
The participates in co-curricular activities including sports, where students take part in various inter school and district level sports competitions.

== See also ==
- Education in Uganda
- State school
