= Sant'Ugo =

- Church of Saint Hugo (the Bishop)
- Chiesa di Sant'Ugo (Vescovo)
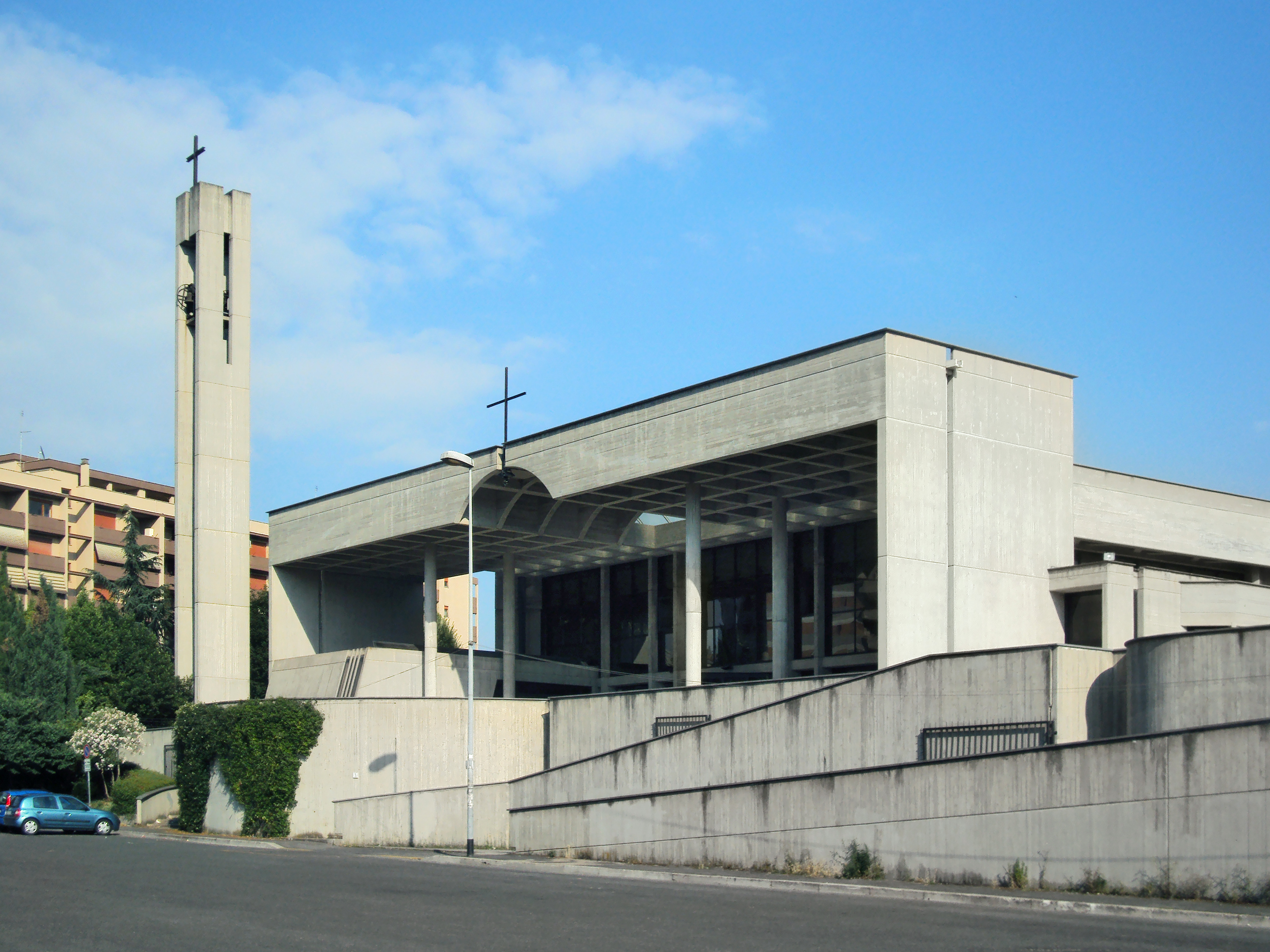
- Click on the map for a fullscreen view
- 41°57′50″N 12°31′04″E
- Location: Viale Lina Cavalieri 3, Val Melaina, Rome
- Country: Italy
- Language: Italian
- Denomination: Catholic
- Tradition: Roman Rite
- Website: santugo.it

History
- Status: titular church
- Dedication: Hugh of Châteauneuf
- Consecrated: 14 December 1991

Architecture
- Functional status: active
- Architectural type: Modern, brutalist
- Groundbreaking: 1989
- Completed: 1991

Administration
- Diocese: Rome

Sant'Ugo [sanˈtuːɡo] is a 20th-century parochial church and titular church in the northern suburbs of Rome, dedicated to Saint Hugh of Châteauneuf (1053–1132).

== History ==
Sant'Ugo was built in 1989–91.

On 26 November 1994, it was made a titular church to be held by a cardinal-priest.

Centro Aletti mosaics depicting the deesis were added in 2000.

Cardinal-Protectors

- Emmanuel Wamala (1994–present)
