= Joseph Kiwánuka =

Ugandan Catholic archbishop (1899–1966)

The Most Reverend Joseph Kiwanuka
- Archbishop of Rubaga
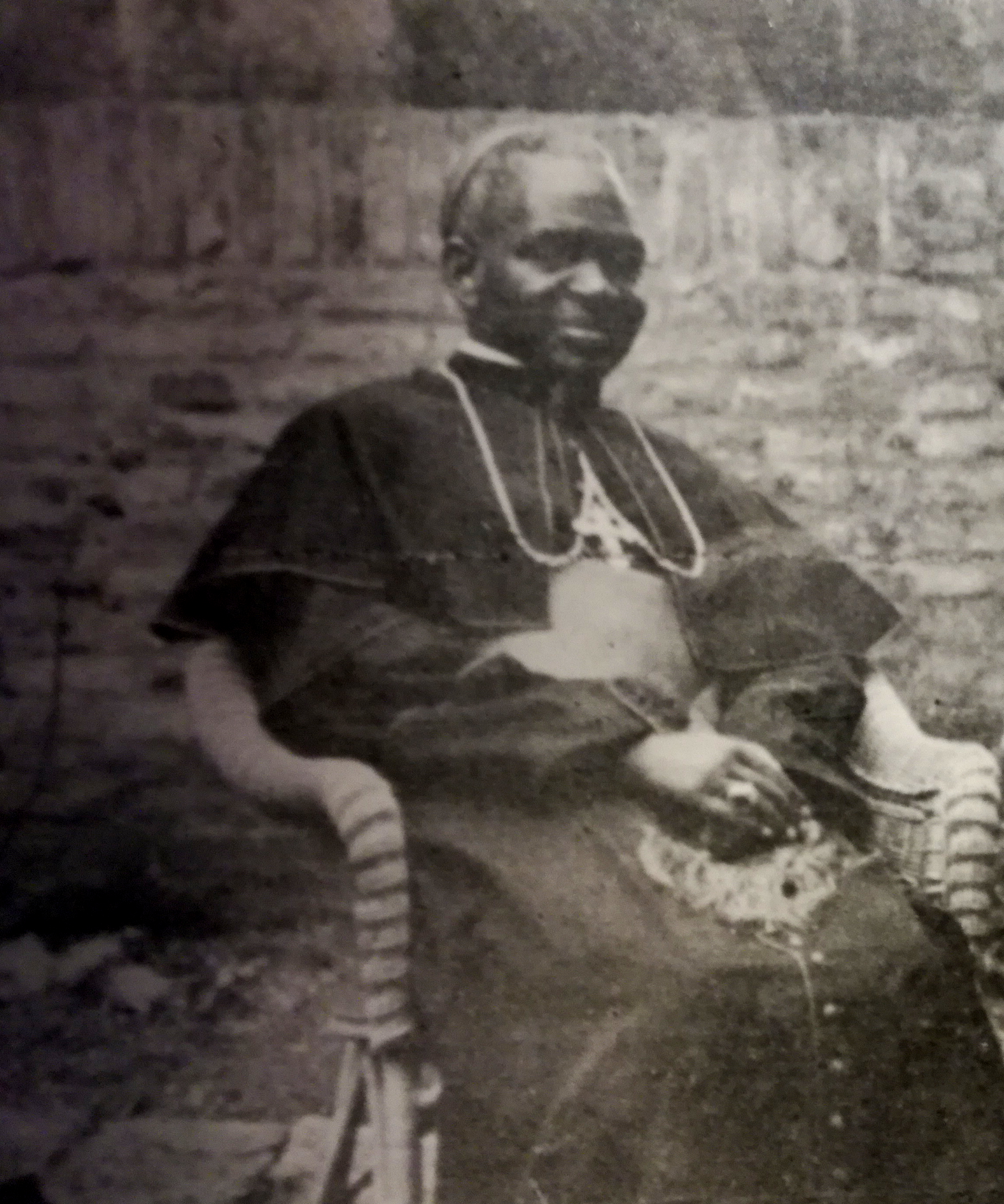
- Joseph Kiwanuka
- Appointed: 20 December 1960
- Term ended: 22 February 1966
- Successor: Emmanuel Nsubuga
- Previous post: Bishop of Masaka

Orders
- Ordination: 26 May 1929 by Henri Streicher
- Consecration: 29 October 1939 by Pope Pius XII

Personal details
- Born: June 25, 1899 Nakirebe, Mpigi District, Uganda
- Died: February 22, 1966 (aged 66) Entebbe, Uganda
- Buried: Lubaga Cathedral

Joseph Nakabaale Kiwanuka (June 25, 1899 – February 22, 1966) was a Ugandan prelate of the Catholic Church. He served as Archbishop of Rubaga from 1960 until his death in 1966.

== Biography ==
Joseph Nakabaale Kiwanuka was born on June 25, 1899, in Nakirebe, Mpigi District, to Catholic parents, Victoro Katumba Munduekanika and Felicitas Nankya Ssabawebwa. Each day, Victoro and his family walked eight miles to Mass at the nearest mission station. He was sent to Mitala Maria Mission School in 1910, after a missionary, who had seen him reading a book, was favorably impressed by this ability. He graduated in 1914, whence he entered the minor seminary in Kiwánuka where he found his vocation greatly tested but persevered nonetheless. He then joined the Katigondo National Major Seminary of Villa Maria, where he excelled in philosophy, and sought to enter the Missionaries of Africa, more commonly known as the White Fathers, in 1923. However, Bishop Henri Streicher, the Apostolic Vicar of Uganda and himself a White Father, was against his decision. The Superior General of the White Fathers at the time finally agreed to admit Kiwánuka after his ordination.

He was ordained to the priesthood by Bishop Streicher on May 26, 1929. Streicher then sent the young priest to Rome to study canon law, in an attempt to prevent him from entering the White Fathers' novitiate, which had invited Kiwánuka in July of that year. In Rome, Kiwánuka studied at the Pontifical University of St. Thomas Aquinas, Angelicum, from where he later obtained his doctorate in canon law, with a dissertation on marriage.

He finally entered the novitiate of the White Fathers in Algeria on October 8, 1932, becoming a full member of the congregation nearly a year later, on October 12, 1933. Upon his return to Uganda in 1933, he did pastoral work in Bikira and Bujuni, and taught at the Katigondo Seminary.

On May 25, 1939, a day before the tenth anniversary of his priestly ordination, Kiwánuka was appointed the first Apostolic Vicar of Masaka and Titular Bishop of Thibica by Pope Pius XII. He received his episcopal consecration on the October 29 from Pope Pius himself, with Archbishops Celso Costantini and Henri Streicher, MAfr, serving as co-consecrators, in St. Peter's Basilica. Kiwánuka was thus made the first native African bishop. He visited the United States in 1950.

He was later given the title of Bishop upon his apostolic vicariate's elevation to a diocesan see on March 25, 1953. During his tenure, the Bishop faced challenges from Muslims, once saying, "Both African and Asian Muslims in the diocese accumulate wealth and slowly extend their influence. Their wealth, plus polygamy, enables them to win many young Catholic girls". He was opposed by African nationalists as well, many of whom viewed Christianity as belonging to Western culture.

Bishop Kiwanuka was active in public affairs, both as a behind-the-scenes advisor to political leaders and as an active participant. in the early 1950s a major political crisis led to the exiling of the King of Buganda by the British colonial governor. The crisis was settled by the Namirembe Conference, in which Bishop Kiwanuka participated. This conference negotiated a new constitutional monarchy for Buganda. (reference: Must we lose Africa, by Colin Legum)

On December 20, 1960, Kiwánuka was appointed Archbishop of Rubaga. He attended the Second Vatican Council from 1962 to 1965, during the course of which he assisted Pope Paul VI in the canonization of the Uganda Martyrs on October 18, 1964. His last great act was issuing a pastoral letter on political leadership and democratic maturity during the governmental crisis of President Milton Obote. He was considered likely to have been elevated to a cardinal.

The Archbishop died shortly afterwards in Entebbe at the age of 66. He is buried in the metropolitan cathedral of Rubaga.

Preceded by none	Bishop of Masaka; 1939–1960	Succeeded by Adrian Kivumbi Ddungu
Preceded by Louis Joseph Cabana, MAfr	Archbishop of Rubaga; 1960–1966	Succeeded by Emmanuel Nsubuga
