= Diocese of Kasana–Luweero =

Diocese of the Catholic Church in Uganda

Coordinates: 0.4007°N 32.0476°E

Diocese of Kasana–Luweero Dioecesis Kasanus-Luveerinus
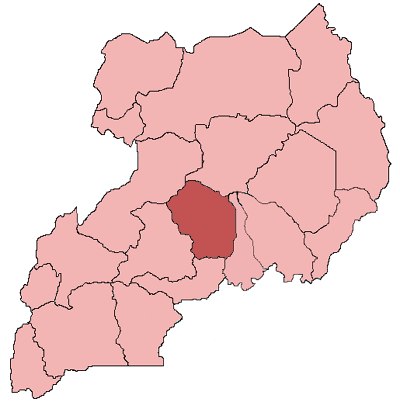
- Uganda - Diocesi di Kasana-Luweero

Location
- Country: Uganda
- Metropolitan: Kampala

Statistics
- Area: 8,539 km^{2} (3,297 sq mi)
- Population: Total; Catholics: (as of 2023); 929,497; 304,017 (32.7%)

Information
- Denomination: Roman Catholic
- Sui iuris church: Latin Church
- Rite: Roman Rite

Current leadership
- Pope: Leo XIV
- Bishop: Lawrence Mukasa
- Bishops emeritus: Paul Ssemogerere

Website
- http://kasanaluweerodiocese.com

The Roman Catholic Diocese of Kasana–Luweero (Latin: Kasan(us) – Luveerin(us)) is a diocese located in the cities of Kasana and Luweero in the ecclesiastical province of Kampala in Uganda.Kasana

== History ==
- 30 November 1996: Established as Diocese of Kasana – Luweero from the Metropolitan Archdiocese of Kampala.

== Bishops ==
- Cyprian Kizito Lwanga (30 November 1996 – 19 August 2006), appointed Archbishop of Kampala
- Paul Ssemogerere (19 August 2008 – 9 December 2021), appointed Archbishop of Kampala.
- Lawrence Mukasa, (5 August 2023 – present)

== See also ==
- Roman Catholicism in Uganda
- Luweero
