= Lubaga Cathedral =

Roman Catholic cathedral in Uganda

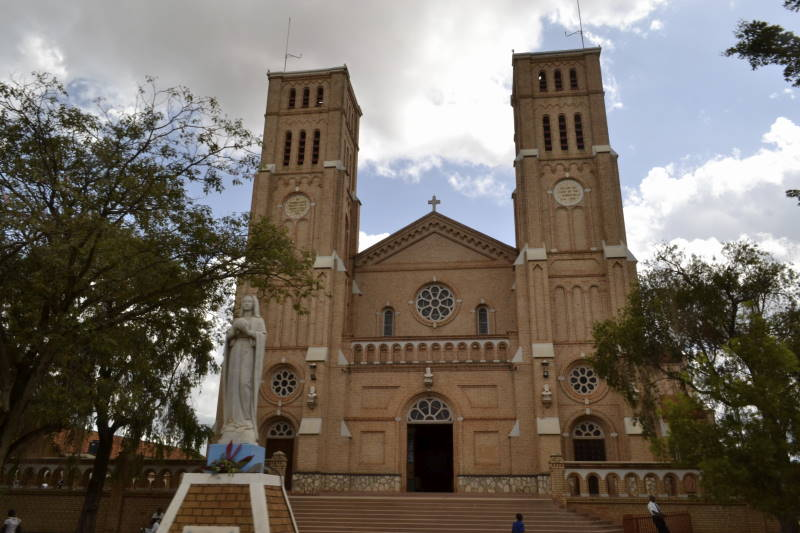

Religion
- Affiliation: Roman Catholic
- Diocese: Archdiocese of Kampala
- Ecclesiastical or organisational status: Major Cathedral
- Leadership: Archbishop Paul Ssemogerere
- Year consecrated: 1925

Location
- Location: Lubaga, Kampala, Uganda
- Interactive map of Lubaga Cathedral
- Coordinates: 0°18′09″N 32°33′08″E

Architecture
- Groundbreaking: 1914
- Completed: 1925

Saint Mary's Cathedral Lubaga, commonly referred to as Lubaga Cathedral, is the parent cathedral of the Roman Catholic Archdiocese of Kampala, the oldest Roman Catholic diocese in Uganda. It is the home church of the Archbishop of Kampala.

== Location ==
The Cathedral is located on Lubaga Hill, in Lubaga Division, in the western part of the city of Kampala, the capital of Uganda and the largest city in that East African country. Lubaga is located approximately 3 kilometres (1.9 mi), by road, west of the central business district of Kampala. The coordinates of Lubaga Cathedral are:0°18'09.0"N, 32°33'08.0"E (Latitude:0.302500; Longitude:32.552222).

== Overview ==
Kabaka Mutesa I Mukaabya Walugembe, the 30th Kabaka of Buganda, who reigned from 1856 until 1884, once maintained a palace on Lubaga Hill. When fire destroyed the palace, he abandoned the hill and relocated to Mengo Hill. In 1889, his son Mwanga II of Buganda, donated that land to the French Catholic missionaries (White Fathers) who were setting up the nascent Catholic church in the country, at that time. In 1914 the missionaries began constructing a modern cathedral at Lubaga (Lubaga). Construction was completed in 1925 and St. Mary's Cathedral Lubaga was consecrated on 31 December 1925.

== Other considerations ==
The remains of the late Archbishop Joseph Kiwanka (June 25, 1899 — February 22, 1966), the first African Catholic Bishop and the first African Archbishop of Kampala Diocese, are housed inside the cathedral.

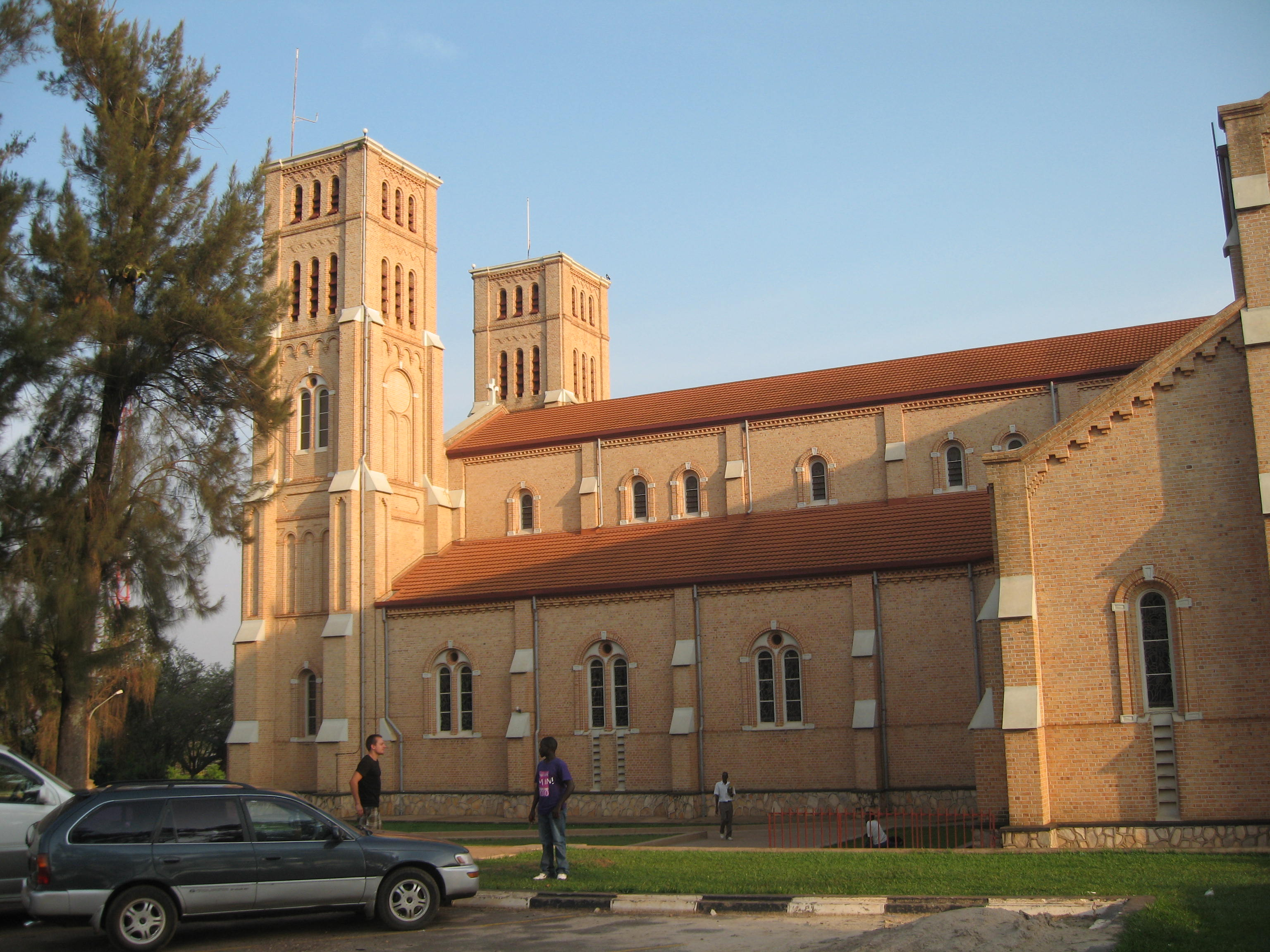
Side view of Lubaga cathedral

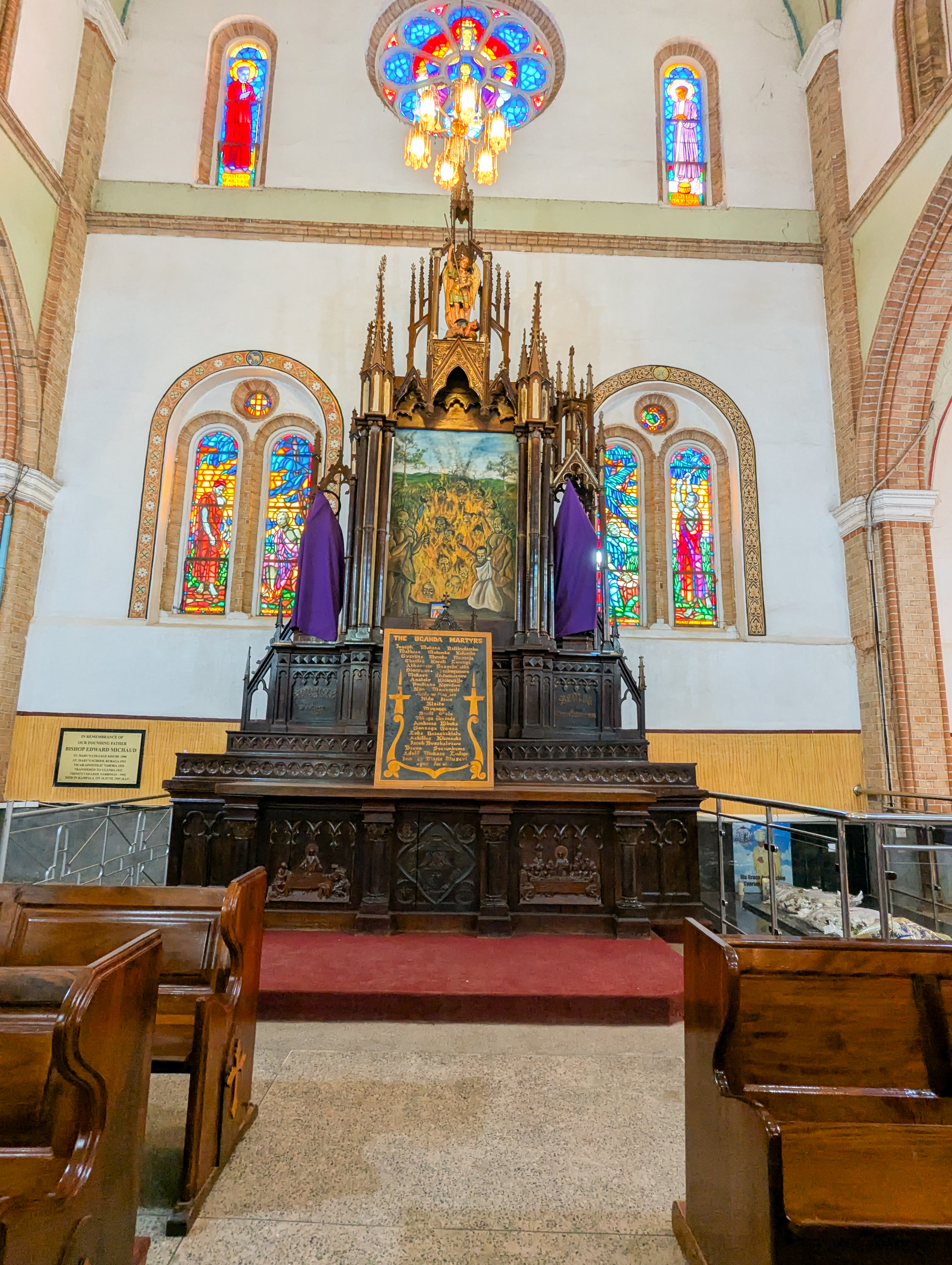
The church organ

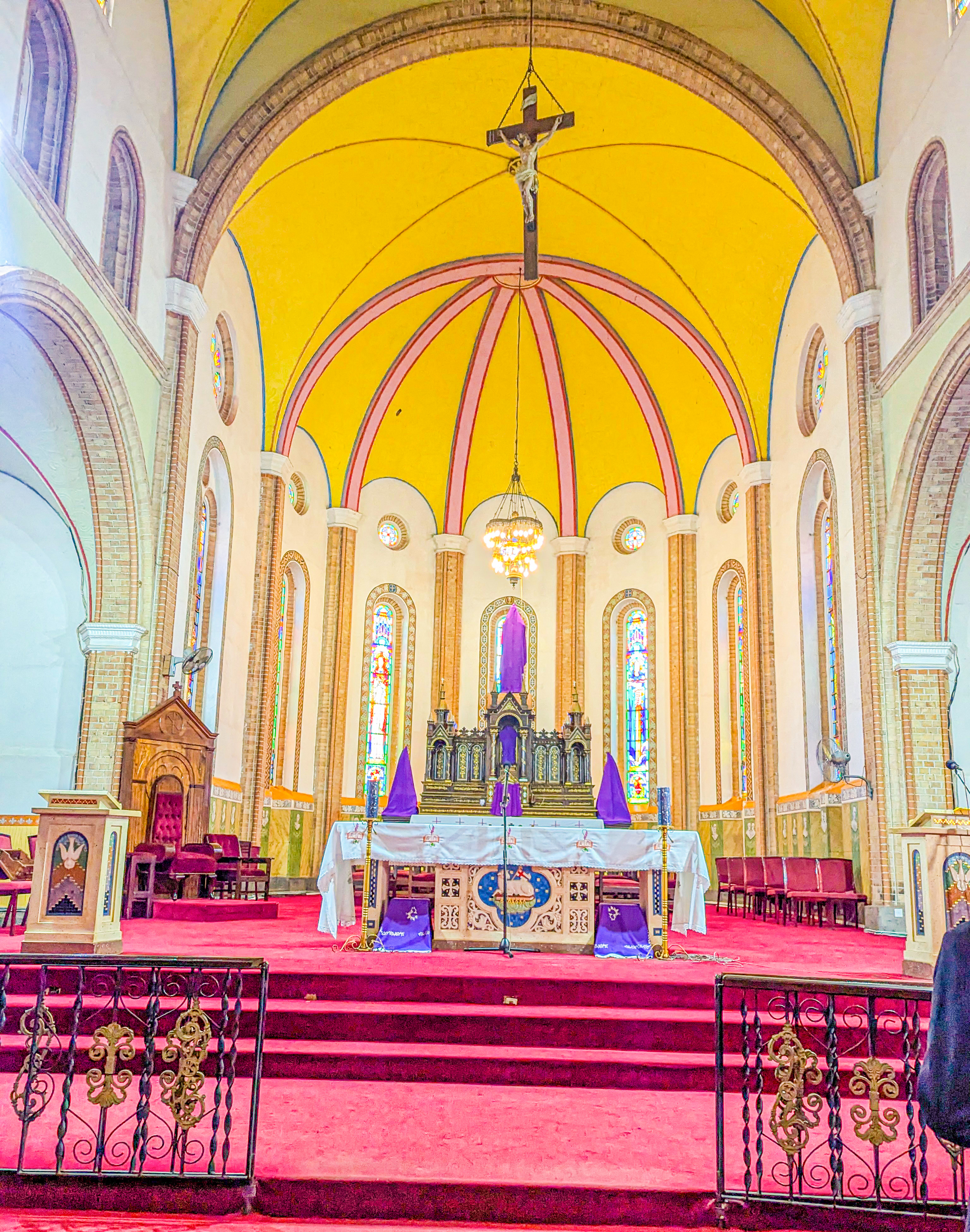
The altar

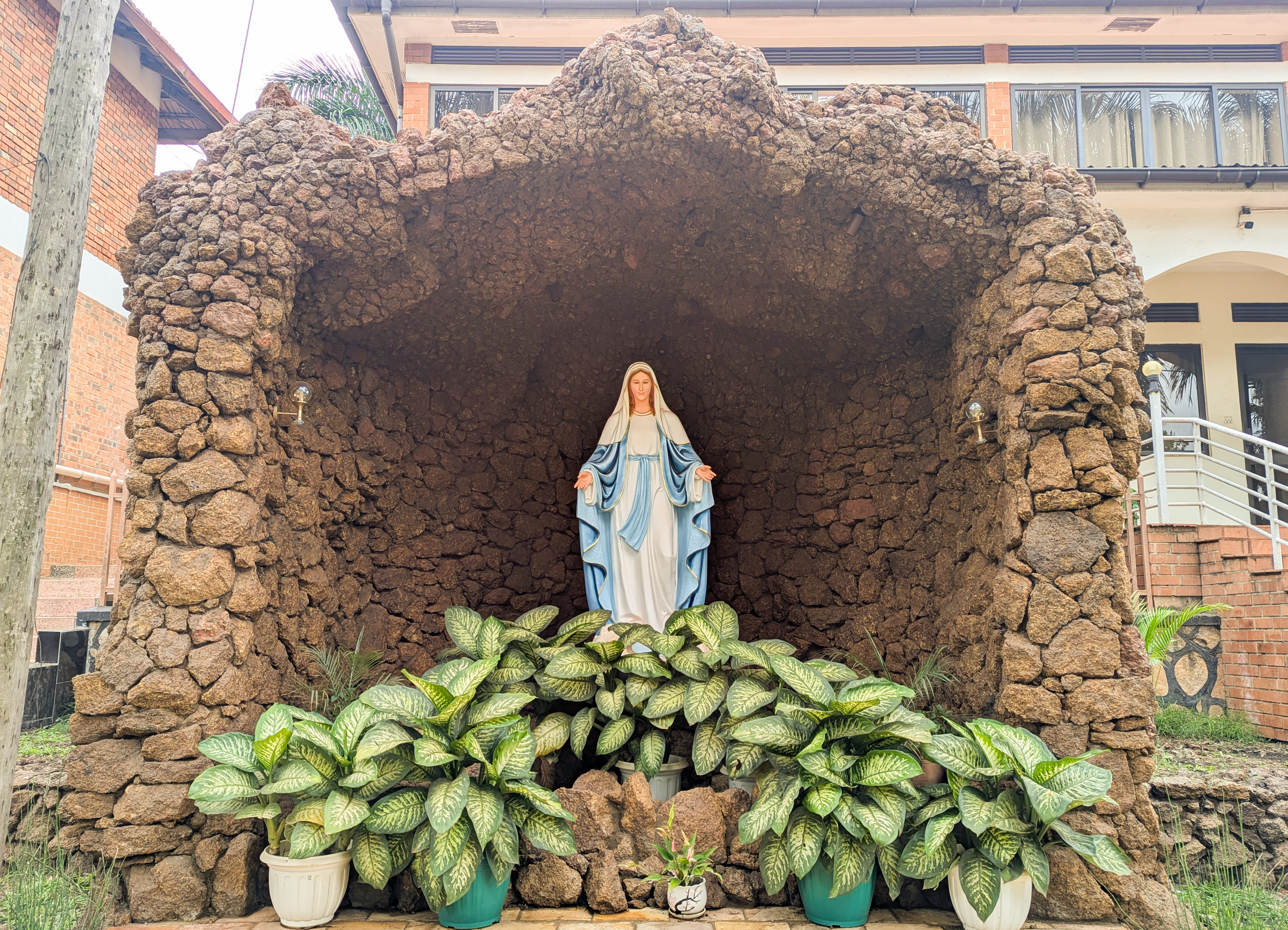
Statue of Mary

== See also ==
- The White Fathers Mission in Uganda
- KCCA
- Namirembe
- Mengo
- Lubaga Division
- Ugandan Catholics
- Namirembe Cathedral
