= Emmanuel Wamala =

Ugandan Catholic cardinal

His Eminence Emmanuel Wamala
- Cardinal; Archbishop Emeritus of Kampala
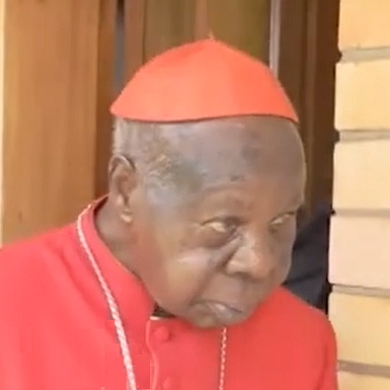
- Church: Roman Catholic Church
- Archdiocese: Kampala
- See: Kampala
- Appointed: 8 February 1990
- Retired: 19 August 2006
- Predecessor: Emmanuel Kiwanuka Nsubuga
- Successor: Cyprian Kizito Lwanga
- Other post: Cardinal-Priest of Sant'Ugo (1994-)
- Previous posts: Bishop of Kiyinda-Mityana (1981-88); Coadjuator Archbishop of Kampala (1988-90)

Orders
- Ordination: 21 December 1957 by Pietro Sigismondi
- Consecration: 22 November 1981 by Emmanuel Kiwanuka Nsubuga
- Created cardinal: 26 November 1994 by Pope John Paul II
- Rank: Cardinal-Priest

Personal details
- Born: Emmanuel Wamala; 15 December 1926 (age 99) Kamaggwa, Diocese of Masaka, Uganda
- Residence: Nsambya, Uganda
- Education: Pontifical Urban University; Pontifical Gregorian University
- Motto: In te Domine speravi (In you, Lord, I have put my trust)

Styles of Emmanuel Wamala
- Reference style: Your Eminence; The Most Reverend
- Spoken style: His Eminence
- Religious style: Archbishop
- Informal style: Cardinal

Emmanuel Wamala (born 15 December 1926) is a Ugandan Catholic prelate who served as the Archbishop of Kampala from 1990 to 2006. He was made a cardinal in 1994.

== Background and education ==
Wamala was born on 15 December 1926 in Kamaggwa Village, Lwaggulwe Parish, in Masaka District, Uganda. He attended elementary school in Kalisizo for four years, before he entered the Bukalasa National Minor Seminary in 1942. After seven years in Bukalasa, he attended the Katigondo National Major Seminary from 1949 to 1955. He obtained a Bachelor of Theology. In September 1956, he was sent to Rome for further study at the Pontifical Urban University, where he obtained a Licentiate in Theology. From 1962 to 1964 he took a course in pedagogy at Makerere University, graduating with a diploma in the subject. Later, he took further educational courses in the United States.

== Priesthood ==
Wamala was ordained a deacon on 15 August 1957 in Rome. He was ordained priest, on 21 December 1957, in the chapel of the Pontifical Collegio Urbaniano, Rome, by Archbishop Pietro Sigismondi, Titular Archbishop of Neapolis in Pisidia. In the same ceremony Stephen Fumio Hamao, future cardinal, was also ordained priest. Also ordained priest at the same time, in the same place was Paul Lokiru Kalanda, Bishop Emeritus of Fort Portal, Uganda.

He returned to Uganda in 1960 and was appointed to various roles including:

- Inspector of diocesan schools in Masaka Catholic Diocese
- Faculty member of the Bukalasa Minor Seminary
- Chaplain, faculty member and rector of Makerere University
- Vicar General of the diocese of Masaka from 1974 until 1981.
- He was created Chaplain of His Holiness on 25 May 1977.

== Bishop ==
On 17 July 1981 Pope John Paul II appointed him bishop of the Roman Catholic Diocese of Kiyinda-Mityana. He was consecrated and installed as Bishop of Kiyinda-Mityana at Saint Noa Mawaggali Church, Mityana, Diocese of Kiyinda-Mityana. The ceremony was held on 22 November 1981. The Principal Consecrator was Cardinal Emmanuel Kiwanuka Nsubuga, Archbishop of Kampala assisted by Bishop Adrian Kivumbi Ddungu, Bishop of Masaka and Bishop Josef Stimpfle, Bishop of Augsburg.

On 21 June 1988 Pope John Paul II appointed him Coadjutor Archbishop of Kampala. On 8 February 1990, Bishop Wamala succeeded as Archbishop of Kampala, following the retirement of Cardinal Emmanuel Kiwanuka Nsubuga earlier the same day.

== Cardinal ==
On 26 November 1994 Pope John Paul II created him Cardinal. He was simultaneously appointed Cardinal-Priest of Sant'Ugo. He was one of the cardinal electors who participated in the 2005 Papal Conclave that selected Pope Benedict XVI, but has lost the right to participate in any future conclave as a result of passing his eightieth birthday. He was succeeded in Kampala by Archbishop Cyprian Kizito Lwanga.

On 9 October 2021 Wamala attended the burial in Uganda of Monsignor Henry Kyabukasa, his 92 year old younger brother. Kyabukasa was a former prelate of the Roman Catholic Diocese of Masaka and died at Villa Maria Hospital in Kalungu District on 6 October 2021. He was buried at Bukalasa Minor Seminary in Kalungu District.

Cardinal Wamala is a Patron of the African Prisons Project, an international non-governmental organisation with a mission to bring dignity and hope to men, women and children in African prisons through health, education, justice and reintegration. Archbishop Emmanuel Wamala was the President of the Episcopal Conference of Uganda from 1986 until 1994. He was also the President of the Uganda Joint Christian Council. Archbishop Wamala became the first Rector of the Uganda Martyrs University, officially opened on 18 October 1993.

He retired as Archbishop of Kampala, on 19 August 2006 and lives on as Archbishop Emeritus of Kampala.

== Retirement ==
On 19 August 2006, Wamala retired as Archbishop of Kampala after reaching the canonical retirement age for diocesan bishops. His resignation was accepted by Pope Benedict XVI, and he was succeeded by Cyprian Kizito Lwanga as Archbishop of Kampala. Following his retirement, Wamala assumed the title Archbishop Emeritus of Kampala and has continued to participate in selected ecclesiastical events and pastoral activities.

Although he ceased the day-to-day administration of archdiocese, he remained a member of the college of Cardinals, having earlier participated in the 2005 papal conclave that elected Pope Benedict XVI. Upon reaching the age of 80 in December 2006, he lost the right to vote in future papal conclaves, in accordance with canon law. He has since resided at the priests centre in Nsambya, Kampala.

Catholic Church titles
Diocese created	Bishop of Kiyinda–Mityana; 17 July 1981 – 21 June 1988	Succeeded by Joseph Mukwaya
Preceded by Emmanuel Nsubuga	Archbishop of Kampala; 8 February 1990 – 19 August 2006	Succeeded by Cyprian Kizito Lwanga
Titular church created	Cardinal Priest of San Ugo; 26 November 1994 –	Incumbent
