= Archdiocese of Kampala =

Latin Catholic archdiocese in Uganda

Coordinates: 0°18′09″N 32°33′08″E

Archdiocese of Kampala Archidioecesis Kampalaensis
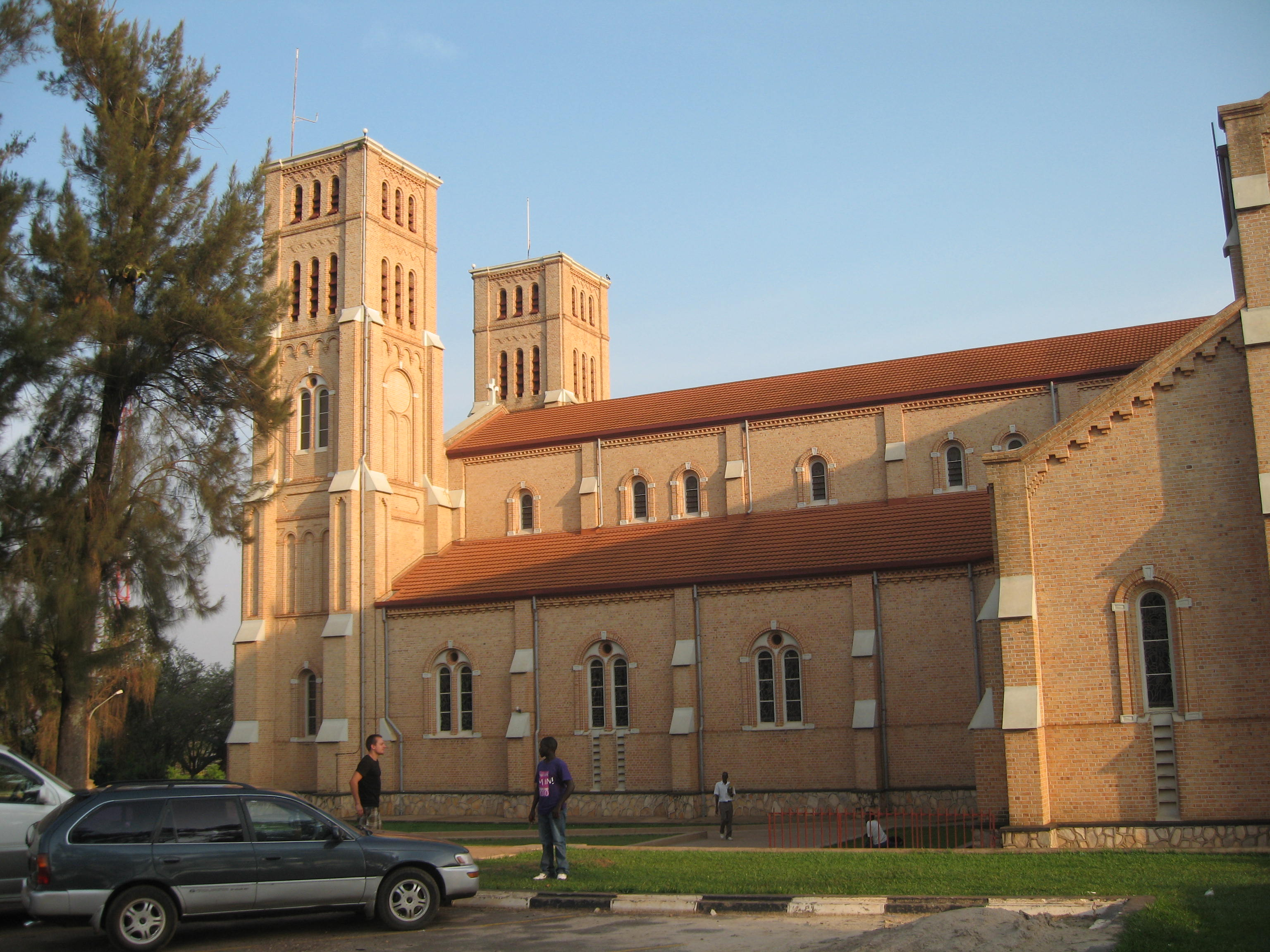
- Catholic Cathedral of Kampala

Location
- Country: Uganda
- Ecclesiastical province: Kampala

Statistics
- Area: 3.644 km^{2} (1.407 sq mi)
- Population: Total; Catholics: (as of 2019); 4,757,721 (est.); 1.952.331 (est.) (41%)
- Parishes: 66

Information
- Denomination: Catholic Church
- Sui iuris church: Latin Church
- Rite: Roman Rite
- Secular priests: 278 (diocesan); 58 (Religious Orders)

Current leadership
- Pope: Leo XIV
- Archbishop: Paul Ssemogerere
- Bishops emeritus: Cardianal Emmanuel Wamala

Map
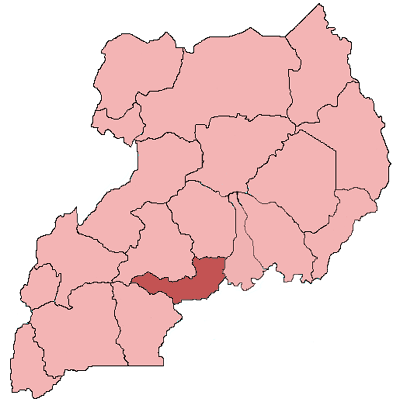
- Location of the Archdiocese of Kampala within Uganda

Website
- www.klarchdiocese.org.ug

The Archdiocese of Kampala is a Latin Church archdiocese of the Catholic Church in Uganda. It is a metropolitan see of its ecclesiastical province, which includes four suffragan dioceses.

== History ==
The present Kampala Archdiocese is the result of territorial changes:

- Victoria Nyanza Vicariate (1883): It was established by the Holy See in 1883 and was entrusted to the Missionaries of Africa commonly known as the White Fathers. Rubaga became the seat of the Bishop.
- Upper Nile Vicariate (1894): On 13 July 1894 the Holy See erected the Upper Nile Vicariate dividing it from Victoria Nyanza Vicariate and entrusted it to the Mill Hill Missionaries. Nsambya became the seat of the Bishop. The name of Vicariate Nyanza Vicariate was also changed to Vicariate Apostolic of Northern Victoria Nyanza.
- Vicariate of Uganda (1915): After the erection of vicariates in territories beyond the Nile on the southern side, the name of Northern Victoria Nyanza Vicariate became the Vicariate of Uganda on 15 January 1915.
- Vicariate of Kampala: On 10 June 1948 the name of Upper Nile Vicariate was changed to the Vicariate of Kampala which later became the diocese of Kampala in 1953.
- Archdiocese of Rubaga (1953–1966): The Catholic hierarchy in Uganda was established on 25 March 1953. The former Vicariates of Uganda became the dioceses of Uganda. Rubaga became the Archdiocese with 5 suffragan dioceses namely: Gulu, Masaka, Kampala, Mbarara and Tororo
- Archdiocese of Kampala (1966–present): On 5 August 1966 the Holy See joined together what was part the Diocese of Kampala and the Archdiocese of Rubaga and created the Archdiocese of Kampala. It was covering most parts of Central Uganda. Since then, three other new dioceses have been carved out of it: Kiyinda-Mityana (17 July 1981), Kasana-Luweero (16 December 1996) and Lugazi (16 December 1996).

== Statistics ==
- Archbishop: Rt. Rev. Paul Ssemogerere
- Size: 3.644.75 square km
- Total Population: 3,592,053
- Catholic Population: 1,505,053 (42%)
- Parishes: 67
- Sub-stations (sub-parishes): 389
- Number of Priests: 324
- Diocesan Priests: 261
- Priests belonging to Religious Institutes: 63
- Professed non-Priest Religious: 186
- Professed Women Religious: 410
- Catechists: 428
- Number of Seminarians (major): 173
- Catholic Universities: 1
- Vocational Institutions: 5
- Catholic-Founded Secondary schools: 45
- Catholic-Founded Primary Schools: 222
- Catholic Hospitals: 4
- Health Centers and Dispensaries: 20

== Lubaga ==
When the Catholic White Fathers came to Lubaga in 1879, they were allocated land near Lubaga Hill. In 1889, the reigning monarch Mwanga II of Buganda, donated them land on Lubaga Hill itself where they built Saint Mary's Cathedral Rubaga, beginning in 1914 until 1925, with the assistance of monetary contributions from Roman Catholic congregations abroad. The early missionaries had problems pronouncing the word Lubaga. They instead pronounced it with an "r" as in Rubaga. In Luganda, there is no word that starts with an "R". (Other Bantu languages from western Uganda and the African Great Lakes Area have words starting with "R".)

Later, the missionaries built a hospital and a nursing school on the hill. Today, Lubaga remains the seat of the headquarters of the Catholic Church in Uganda. It is the seat of the Roman Catholic Archdiocese of Kampala.

The remains of the first African Catholic bishop in Uganda, Bishop Joseph Nakabaale Kiwanuka and those of the first indigenous Ugandan Catholic Cardinal, Cardinal Emmanuel Kiwanuka Nsubuga are kept in the Catholic Mission on the hill.

=== Church landmarks ===
- St. Mary's Cathedral Lubaga
- Administrative centre of the Kampala Archdiocese
- Residence of the Archbishop of Kampala Archdiocese
- Lubaga Hospital: A 300-bed community hospital administered by the Catholic Archdiocese of Kampala
- Lubaga Nurses School
- Pope Paul VI Memorial Community Center
- Headquarters of Lubaga Division: One of the five administrative divisions of the city of Kampala.
- Lubaga Campus of Uganda Martyrs University, whose main campus is at Nkozi in Mpigi District.
- Kisubi Mapeera Secondary School

=== Special churches ===
The seat of the Archbishop is Saint Mary's Cathedral in Lubaga Division, in western Kampala. There are two Minor Basilica of the Uganda Martyrs, at Namugongo in Wakiso District and Munyonyo Martyrs Shrine. Other important churches in the Archdiocese include (a) Lady of Africa Church in Mbuya and the Former Cathedral of Saint Peter at Nsambya.

== Bishops ==
=== Ordinaries ===
Vicars Apostolic of Victoria-Nyanza

- Bishop Léon-Antoine-Augustin-Siméon Livinhac, M. Afr.: 1883–1889
- Bishop Jean-Joseph Hirth, M. Afr.: 1889–1894, appointed Vicar Apostolic of Southern Victoria Nyanza {Victoria-Nyanza Meridionale}
- Antonin Guillermain, M. Afr. † (12 January 1895 Appointed – 14 July 1896 Died)

Vicars Apostolic of Northern Victoria Nyanza

- Bishop Henri Streicher, M.Afr.: 1897–1915 see below

Vicars Apostolic of Uganda

- Bishop Henri Streicher, M.Afr.: see above 1915–1933
- Bishop Edouard Michaud, M.Afr.: 1933–1945
- Bishop Louis Joseph Cabana, M.Afr.: 1947–1953 see below

Metropolitan Archbishops of Lubaga

- Archbishop Louis Joseph Cabana, M.Afr.: see above 1953–1960
- Archbishop Joseph Kiwánuka, M.Afr.: 1960–1966

Metropolitan Archbishops of Kampala

- Archbishop Emmanuel Nsubuga: 1966–1990 (Cardinal in 1976)
- Archbishop Emmanuel Wamala: 1990–2006 (Cardinal in 1994)
- Archbishop Cyprian Kizito Lwanga: 2006–2021
- Archbishop Paul Ssemwogerere: 2021–present

=== Coadjutors ===
- Jean Forbes, M. Afr., Coadjutor Vicar Apostolic (1917–1926), died without succeeding to see
- Joseph Georges Edouard Michaud, M. Afr., Coadjutor Vicar Apostolic (1932–1933)
- Emmanuel Wamala, Coadjutor Archbishop (1988-–1990), future Cardinal

=== Auxiliary Bishops ===
- Christopher Kakooza (1999–2014), appointed Bishop of Lugazi
- Joseph Mukwaya (1982–1988), appointed Bishop of Kiyinda-Mityana
- Matthias Ssekamaanya (1985–1996), appointed Bishop of Lugazi

=== Other priests of this diocese who became bishops ===
- Augustine Kasujja, appointed nuncio and titular archbishop in 1998
- Paul Ssemogerere, appointed Bishop of Kasana-Luweero in 2008, became Archbishop here in 2021.

== Suffragan dioceses ==
- Kasana–Luweero
- Kiyinda–Mityana
- Lugazi
- Masaka

== See also ==
- Kampala
- Lubaga
- Lugazi
- Luweero
- Masaka
- Namugongo
- Nsambya
- Uganda Catholics
