= Emmanuel Nsubuga =

Uganda Catholic prelate who served as the first Archbishop of Kampala from 1966 to 1990

His Eminence Emmanuel Kiwanuka Nsubuga
- Archbishop Emeritus of Kampala
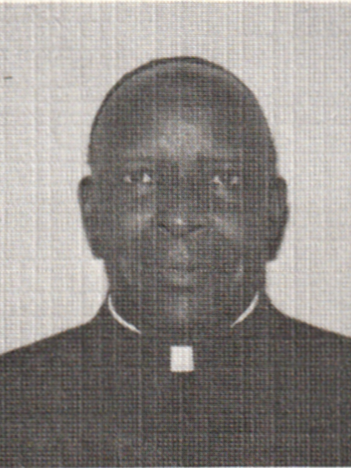
- Portrait image Emmanuel Cardinal Kiwankuka Nsubuga (1984)
- Church: Roman Catholic Church
- Archdiocese: Kampala
- See: Kampala
- Appointed: 5 August 1966
- Term ended: 8 February 1990
- Predecessor: Vincent Billington
- Successor: Emmanuel Wamala
- Other post: Cardinal-Priest of Santa Maria Nuova (1976-91)
- Previous post: President of the Ugandan Episcopal Conference (1969-75)

Orders
- Ordination: 15 December 1946
- Consecration: 30 October 1966 by Laurean Rugambwa
- Created cardinal: 24 May 1976 by Pope Paul VI
- Rank: Cardinal-Priest

Personal details
- Born: Emmanuel Kiwanuka Nsubuga; 5 November 1914 Kisule, Uganda
- Died: 20 April 1991 (aged 76) Cologne, Germany
- Motto: Mater profer lumen caecis

Emmanuel Kiwanuka Nsubuga (5 November 1914 – 20 April 1991) was a Uganda Catholic prelate who served as the first Archbishop of Kampala from 1966 to 1990 and as a cardinal from 1976 until his death. He was an outspoken critic of human rights abuses of the military dictatorship of Idi Amin.

During Amin's rule, Nsubuga spoke against the government's human rights abuses. He also encouraged priests and nuns throughout the country to shelter people fleeing harassment by the army during the civil war that later raged during the Government of Milton Obote.

== Early life and ordination ==
Cardinal Nsubuga was born on 5 November 1914 in Kisule village, Mityana district to Felix and Estella Nsubuga. He began his ecclesiastical training in 1930 at Bukuumi and continued through minor and major seminary education. Ordained a priest on 15 December 1946 at Rubaga Cathedral.

== Episcopal leadership ==
On 5 August 1966, Cardinal Nsubuga was appointed Archbishop of the newly erected Archdiocese of Kampala and was consecrated on 30 October 1966 by Cardinal Laurean Rugambwa.

He was succeeded in 1990 as Archbishop of Kampala by Emmanuel Wamala, who became a cardinal in 1994.

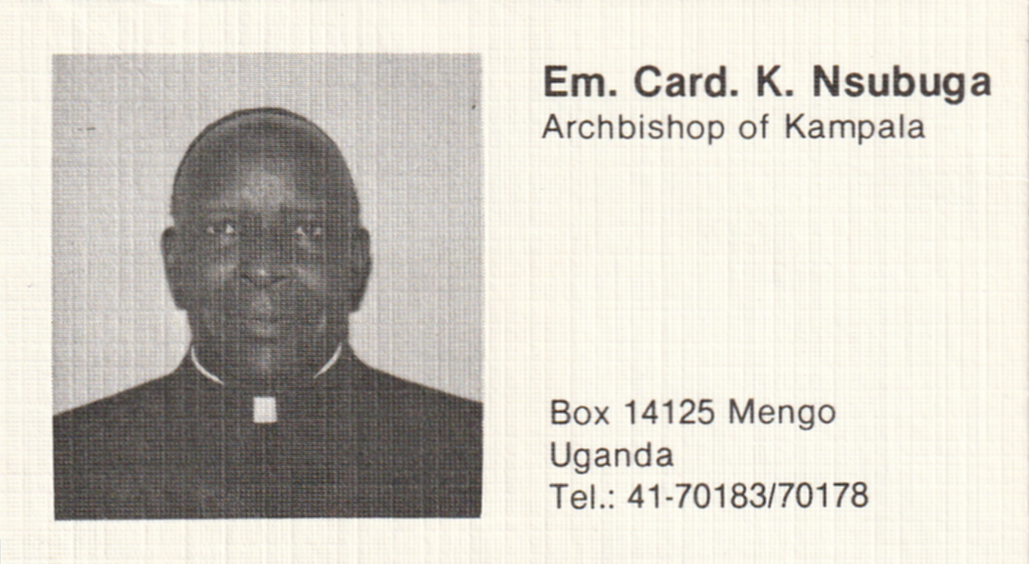
Card of his Eminence Emmanuel Nsubuga (Sept. 1984)

== Elevation to Cardinal and service ==
On May 24, 1976, Pope Paul VI elevated Cardinal Emmanuel Nsubuga a Cardinal-Priest, assigning him a title of Santa Maria Nuova. This appointment marked him as the first Ugandan to become a cardinal. As cardinal, Nsubuga became Uganda's moral compass, championing justice, peace, and human rights. He openly criticized Idi Amin’s dictatorship in the 1970s, speaking out against the regime's cruelty. Nsubuga used his standing to condemn the violence and oppression sanctioned by the state. He also urged Catholic clergy and religious groups in Uganda to give refuge to those escaping political persecution, especially when the country was dealing with civil unrest and military clashes.

Catholic Church titles
Preceded by New diocese	Archbishop of the Archdiocese of Kampala; 1966–1990	Succeeded by Emmanuel Wamala
