= Catholic Church in Uganda =

The Catholic Church in Uganda is part of the worldwide Catholic Church, under the spiritual leadership of the Pope in Rome.

According to the 2024 census, there were an estimated 16,985,004 Catholics in the country, comprising around 37 percent of the total population.

== Dioceses of Uganda ==
- Gulu
  - Arua
  - Lira
  - Nebbi
- Kampala
  - Kasana-Luweero
  - Kiyinda-Mityana
  - Lugazi
  - Masaka
- Mbarara
  - Fort Portal
  - Hoima
  - Kabale
  - Kasese
- Tororo
  - Jinja
  - Kotido
  - Moroto
  - Soroti

== Catholicism in Uganda Pre-Independence ==
The first Europeans arrived in Uganda in 1862, when John Speke traversed the region in a search for the source of the Nile. European arrivals increased in the following years, and the White Fathers became the country's first Catholic missionaries in 1879. Their evangelization was effective, and the baptized population increased to 8,500 by 1888. The conversion of natives was met with hostility by Kabaka Mwanga II, King of Buganda, who saw the Christian religion as jeopardizing his authority. Catholic converts and those affiliated with the White Fathers were often arrested and put to death for their beliefs, their remains strewed across the land as a warning to anyone considering conversion. This persecution and violence climaxed in the killing of the Uganda Martyrs, when 22 Catholic converts were burned alive at Namugongo. Persecution directed toward the region's Christians slowed the arrival of missionaries during this time, and many left out of fear. However, Uganda was annexed by the British in 1890, which allowed for more Christian influence in the country. The Mill Hill Missionaries and Verona Fathers were the most prominent Catholic missionaries in the territory during the following years. Mill Hill Missionaries mainly evangelized in Eastern Uganda, while the Verona Fathers converted people in the North. Efforts to convert the indigenous population were successful, and the population of all Catholics in the country grew to 86,000 by the year 1905, and 370,000 in 1923, representing roughly 12.4% of the population. Uganda's first native Bishop, Joseph Kiwanuka, was consecrated in 1939, where he served as Apostolic Vicar of Masaka.

The Catholic Church celebrates on June 3 the feast of the Uganda Martyrs — Saint Charles Lwanga and his companions — who were killed by King Mwanga II between 1885 and 1887.

== Colonies and Maternity ==
Prior to colonial intervention, motherhood and all relating topics were imbedded into kinship systems and community-based reproductive knowledge. Pregnancy and childbirth were often handled by experienced older women within families and local communities. Pre-colonial maternal authority at was very closely linked to subsistence practices and social status. During the colonial periods of Central and East Africa, Christian missionaries played a central role in shaping reproductive practices, meanings of motherhood, pregnancy, and childbirth. Missionary activities, specifically Protestant and Catholic Organizations, were a key intermediate between enforcements of colonial governance and African communities. In British controlled Uganda, we often see that although missionaries targeted motherhood and domestic life, British indirect rule led to the preservation of pre-colonial reproductive practices.

Motherhood in Uganda prior to colonial rule was embedded in kinship systems and subsidence production. Childbirth was managed through women-centered knowledge and authority tied to women's roles in sustaining their families and in effect their communities. The power and authority of women came from the various labors they worked, stemming and eventually coming to be identified, from the need of reproduction. Women's reproductive labor was central to individual household and social stability and power. These labors included pregnancy, childbirth, breastfeeding and subsidence farming. In Uganda, missionary powers worked under British indirect rule, so their engagement was more unevenly distributed within the already existing social structures. British missionaries promoted Christian domestic family ideals, motherhood was framed as a moral responsibility of women. However, they did not achieve the same institutional control as the Belgian colonies did. The combination of unevenly distributed British rule, preexisting precolonial kinship ties, and subsistence farming systems continued to largely shape reproductive lives in Uganda. Medical services in Uganda expanded into institutionalized biomedical care, however reproductive care resided heavily in Indigenous birth systems based on past kinship ties. Missionaries promoted clinic supported births and hospitalized prenatal care, however due to uneven enforcement by British indirect rule, many policies were unevenly adopted, especially in rural areas. Rather than displacing indigenous birthing practices, missionary led medicinal pre/post-natal care became part of another option available to pregnant women. In Uganda, breastfeeding and birth spaces remained closely ties to precolonial kinship systems, limiting missionary capacity to fully intervene in Pre/Post - reproductive practices. Although missionaries expressed their concerns in maternal and infant health, interventions did not produce a high level of colonial governance on reproductive practices.

== 2020s ==
In 2020, there were over 2,500 priests and over 4,000 nuns serving across 654 parishes; the church also ran 49 hospitals and homes for the old and infirm.

== See also ==
- Religion in Uganda
- List of Saints from Africa
