= List of Catholic dioceses in Uganda =

The Roman Catholic Church in Uganda is composed of 4 ecclesiastical provinces and 15 suffragan dioceses.

== List of dioceses ==
=== Episcopal Conference of Uganda ===
==== Ecclesiastical Province of Gulu ====
- Archdiocese of Gulu
  - Diocese of Arua
  - Diocese of Lira
  - Diocese of Nebbi

==== Ecclesiastical Province of Kampala ====
- Archdiocese of Kampala
  - Diocese of Kasana–Luweero
  - Diocese of Kiyinda–Mityana
  - Diocese of Lugazi
  - Diocese of Masaka

==== Ecclesiastical Province of Mbarara ====
- Archdiocese of Mbarara
  - Diocese of Fort Portal
  - Diocese of Hoima
  - Diocese of Kabale
  - Diocese of Kasese

==== Ecclesiastical Province of Tororo ====
- Archdiocese of Tororo
  - Diocese of Jinja
  - Diocese of Kotido
  - Diocese of Moroto
  - Diocese of Soroti
