= Raphael p'Mony Wokorach =

Ugandan Roman Catholic Prelate

The Most Reverend Monsignor Raphael p’Mony Wokorach, MCCJ
- Metropolitan Archbishop of Gulu
- Church: Roman Catholic Church
- Archdiocese: Gulu
- See: Gulu
- Appointed: 22 March 2024
- Predecessor: Sanctus Lino Wanok
- Previous posts: Bishop of the Diocese of Nebbi (31 March 2021 - 22 March 2024); Apostolic Administrator of Nebbi Diocese (12 July 2024 - 22 February 2025)

Orders
- Ordination: 25 September 1993 by Martin Luluga

Personal details
- Born: 21 January 1961 (age 65) Arua District, Uganda

Styles of Raphael p’Mony Wokorach
- Reference style: His Excellency
- Spoken style: The Most Reverend
- Religious style: Monsignor

Raphael p’Mony Wokorach, MCCJ, is a Roman Catholic prelate and professed member of Comboni Missionaries of the Heart of Jesus, who was appointed Bishop of the Diocese of Nebbi, in Uganda, on 31 March 2021. He was appointed the Metropolitan Archbishop of the Archdiocese of Gulu on 22 March 2024.

== Early life and priesthood ==
Wokorach was born on 21 January 1961, at Ojigo Village in Wadelai, in the then Diocese of Arua, in present-day Arua District in the West Nile sub-region in the Northern Region of Uganda.

He attended Ragem Primary School before entering the highly selective Saints Peter and Paul Minor (Preparatory) Seminary at Pokea, in Arua, studying Sciences, Mathematics, Social Studies and Latin from 1975 until 1979, for his O-Level education. He transferred to the all-boys' boarding school, St. Joseph's College, Ombaci, also in Arua, where he completed his A-Level education, graduating in 1982, with the equivalent of a high school diploma.

Between 1983 and 1987, Wokorach studied philosophy at Uganda Martyrs' National Major Seminary Alokolum, in Gulu, Uganda. In 1987, he was awarded a Bachelor of Arts degree in Philosophy, by the Pontifical Urban University, in Rome. He continued with his studies in Kenya, graduating with a Master of Arts degree in Philosophy from the Catholic University of Eastern Africa in 1994.

He is a member of the Comboni Missionaries of the Heart of Jesus (Latin: Missionarii Comboniani Cordis Iesu), also known as the Comboni Missionaries of the Sacred Heart, the Verona Fathers, or the Sons of the Sacred Heart of Jesus, and originally called the Sacred Heart of Jesus (Congregatio Filiorum S. Cordis Iesu), a male religious institute of papal law: the members of this congregation, known merely as Comboni, bear the letters MCCI. It was founded on 1 June 1867 by Italian priest Daniel Comboni.

Wokorach was ordained priest on 25 September 1993 at Wadelai Parish, in Arua Diocese, by Martin Luluga, the Bishop of Gulu at that time. He served as a priest in the Roman Catholic Diocese of Nebbi until 31 March 2021.

== As bishop ==
He was appointed bishop on 31 March 2021 by Pope Francis. He replaced Bishop Sanctus Lino Wanok, who served as Bishop of Nebbi from 8 February 2011 until 23 November 2018, when he was transferred to Lira Diocese as bishop. During the absence of a bishop at Nebbi (2018 to 2021), Monsignor Emmanuel Odaga served as the diocesan administrator. He was installed as Bishop of Nebbi Catholic Diocese on 14 August 2021.

Wokorach was consecrated bishop on 14 August 2021, at Immaculate Heart of Mary Cathedral, Nebbi, in the Roman Catholic Diocese of Nebbi by Archbishop John Baptist Odama, Archbishop of the Roman Catholic Archdiocese of Gulu, assisted by Archbishop Luigi Bianco, Titular Archbishop of Falerone and Papal Nuncio to Uganda, Bishop Giuseppe Filippi, M.C.C.I., Bishop of the Roman Catholic Diocese of Kotido and Bishop Sanctus Lino Wanok, Bishop of the Roman Catholic Diocese of Lira. His installation as Archbishop of Gulu was scheduled for Sunday, 14 July 2024, at St. Joseph's Cathedral, Gulu. He received the pallium – the symbol of his authority as metropolitan archbishop – from Pope Francis on June 29, the Solemnity of Saints Peter and Paul, in Rome.

Wokorach was installed at St Joseph's Cathedral in Gulu City at a ceremony presided over by Archbishop Luigi Bianco the Papal Nuncio to Uganda, who draped the new metropolitan prelate with the pallium, which was received from Pope Francis on 29 June 2024. The new archbishop succeeded John Baptist Odama, the Archbishop Emeritus of Gulu, who retired having attained the retirement age of 75 years. At the ceremony, Wokorach was appointed the apostolic administrator of Nebbi diocese until a new bishop is appointed.

== Personal life ==
Raphael p'Mony Wokorach is fluent in several languages including English, French, Italian, Alur, Acholi and Kiswahili.

== See also ==
- Uganda Martyrs
- Roman Catholicism in Uganda
- Roman catholic Archdiocese of Gulu
- Roman Catholic Diocese of Nebbi

== Succession table ==
Catholic Church titles
Preceded by Sanctus Lino Wanok (8 February 2011 - 23 November 2018)	Bishop of Nebbi Diocese; 31 March 2021 - 22 March 2024	Succeeded by Constantine Rupiny (since 26 November 2024)
Preceded by John Baptist Odama (2 January 1999 - 22 March 2024)	Archbishop of Gulu Archdiocese; 22 March 2024 - present	Succeeded by Incumbent
