= Kinyamaskia National Major Seminary =

Ugandan Catholic institution

Saint Paul's National Major Seminary Kinyamasika
- Type: Private, Seminary
- Established: 1992; 34 years ago
- Accreditation: Uganda Episcopal Conference; Uganda National Council for Higher Education
- Affiliations: Catholic Church in Uganda
- Religious affiliation: Catholic
- Academic affiliations: Makerere University
- Rector: Father Vincent Muhindo (2022)
- Location: Kinyamasika, Southern Division, Fort Portal, Uganda; 00°37′59″N 30°16′39″E
- Website: Homepage
- Location in Uganda

Kinyamasika National Major Seminary, (also Saint Paul's National Major Seminary Kinyamasika) is a National Seminary of the Catholic Church in Uganda. The institution is a training facility and House of Formation under the auspices of the Uganda Episcopal Conference (UEC). The institution is also accredited by the Uganda National Council for Higher Education to teach some non-religious academic courses. The seminary is affiliated with both the Pontifical Urban University in Rome, Italy and with Makerere University in Kampala, Uganda.

== Location ==
The seminary is located in Kinyamasika, in the Southern Division of the city of Fort Portal in the Western Region of Uganda. This is approximately 6 kilometres (4 mi) south of the central business district of Fort Portal.

== History ==
Saint Paul's National Major Seminary was opened at the present location at Kinyamasika in August 1992. The seminary specializes in the teaching of Theology. All Catholic Dioceses in Uganda are eligible to "send in their candidates for the final four years of priestly training and formation". The first Rector of the seminary was Father Peter Isingoma from the Diocese of Hoima. Some of the original faculty included Father Vincent Kanyonza from the Diocese of Kabale, Father Jacinto Ogwal from the Diocese of Lira, Father John Baptist Bashobora from the Archdiocese of Mbarara and Father Francis Aquirinus Kibira, from Diocese of Fort Portal. Francis Aquirinus Kibira later became Bishop of the Diocese of Kasese.

Kinyamasika National Major Seminary celebrated their 25th anniversary (Silver Jubilee) in 2016.

== Academics ==
The seminary is primarily a school of theology, which instructs seminarians in Theology before they are ordained priests. The seminary awards the Diploma in Theology on its own letterhead. It also awards a Bachelor of Theology degree in corroboration with the Pontifical Urban University in Rome. It also awards a Master's degree in Theology and Religious Studies in conjunction with Makerere University.

== Overview ==
As of October 2025, this seminary is one of five Major Catholic seminaries in Uganda.

- St. Thomas Aquinas Katigondo Major Seminary: Teaching Philosophy.
- Uganda Martyr's National Major Seminary Alokolum, Archdiocese of Gulu: Teaching Philosophy.
- Saint Paul's National Major Seminary Kinyamasika, Diocese of Fort Portal: Teaching Theology.
- Saint Mary's National Major Seminary Ggaba, Archdiocese of Kampala: Teaching Theology.
- Saint Mbaaga's Major Seminary Ggaba, Archdiocese of Kampala: For seminarians who start the vocation when mature.

== Rectors ==
As of April 2025, the Rector of the seminary is Father Vincent Muhindo.
