= Constantine Rupiny =

Ugandan Roman Catholic prelate

The Most Reverend Constantine Rupiny
- Bishop of Nebbi, Uganda
- Church: Roman Catholic Church
- Archdiocese: Roman Catholic Archdiocese of Gulu
- See: Nebbi
- Appointed: 26 November 2024
- Installed: 22 February 2025
- Predecessor: Raphael p'Mony Wokorach
- Previous post: Rector of Uganda Martyrs' Alokolum National Major Seminary (2023–2024)

Orders
- Ordination: 28 August 2004
- Consecration: 22 February 2025 by Raphael p'Mony Wokorach
- Rank: Bishop

Personal details
- Born: Constantine Rupiny; 10 November 1974 (age 51) Parombo, Nebbi District, Uganda
- Motto: "Charity in Truth"

Styles of Constantine Rupiny
- Reference style: His Excellency
- Spoken style: The Most Reverend
- Religious style: Monsignor

Constantine Rupiny (born 10 November 1974) is a Roman Catholic prelate in Uganda, who was appointed as the Bishop of the Roman Catholic Diocese of Nebbi by Pope Francis on 26 November 2024. Prior to his appointment as Bishop of Nebbi, Father Constantine Rupiny served as the Rector of the Uganda Martyrs' National Major Seminary Alokolum, in Gulu, Uganda. He was consecrated and installed at Nebbi on 22 February 2025.

== Early life and education ==
He was born on 10 November 1974 at Parombo, in present-day Nebbi District in the West Nile sub-region, in the Northern Region of Uganda. This location is in the Roman Catholic Diocese of Nebbi.

He was admitted to the Uganda Martyrs' National Major Seminary Alokolum, Gulu District, where he studied philosophy. He then transferred to the Ggaba National Major Seminary at Ggaba, in Kampala, where he pursued theological studies. He graduated with a Licentiate in Philosophy from the Pontifical Gregorian University in Rome, Italy. Later he obtained the degree of Doctorate in Dogmatic Theology from the Cardinal Stefan Wyszyński University, Warsaw, in Poland.

== Priesthood ==
He was ordained a priest on 28 August 2004. Father Rupiny served in various roles as a priest of the Roman Catholic Diocese of Nebbi, including as:

- Vicar Parish Priest in Kango (2004–2005)
- Parish Priest in Akanyo (2005–2007)
- Formator and Professor at Uganda Martyrs' National Major Seminary, Alokolum (2007–2009 and 2011–2018)
- Vice President of the College of Consultors of the Diocese of Nebbi (2017–2018)
- Vice Rector (January–September 2023)
- Rector (September 2023 to December 2024).

At the time that he was appointed bishop, he was the rector of the Uganda Martyrs' National Major Seminary, Alokolum.

== As bishop ==
He was appointed bishop of the Roman Catholic Diocese of Nebbi, on 26 November 2024. He was ordained 5th Bishop of Nebbi on 22 February 2025 by Archbishop Raphael p'Mony Wokorach. Archbishop Wokorach was assisted by Archbishop Luigi Bianco, Titular Archbishop of Falerone and Bishop Francis Aquirinus Kibira, Bishop of Kasese.

Bishop Constantine Rupiny took over the diocese from Archbishop Raphael p'Mony Wokorach, who served as the Apostolic Administrator of Nebbi Diocese since 12 July 2024, when he (Wokorach) the last diocesan bishop, was elevated to his current position as the Archbishop of the Roman Catholic Archdiocese of Gulu.

== See also ==
- Uganda Martyrs
- Roman Catholicism in Uganda

== Succession table ==
Catholic Church titles
Preceded by Raphael p'Mony Wokorach (2021 - 2024)	Bishop of Roman Catholic Diocese of Nebbi; Since 26 November 2024	Succeeded by Incumbent
