= Sanctus Lino Wanok =

Ugandan Catholic prelate (born 1957)

The Most Reverend Sanctus Lino Wanok
- Bishop of Lira, Uganda
- Church: Catholic Church
- Archdiocese: Roman Catholic Archdiocese of Gulu
- See: Roman Catholic Diocese of Lira
- Appointed: 23 November 2018
- Installed: 9 February 2019
- Predecessor: Giuseppe Franzelli
- Successor: Incumbent
- Other post: Bishop of Nebbi (8 February 2011 - 23 November 2018)

Orders
- Ordination: 27 September 1986 by Frederick Drandua
- Consecration: 30 April 2011 by John Baptist Odama

Personal details
- Born: Sanctus Lino Wanok; 7 April 1957 (age 68) Ukuru Pamach Village, Zombo District, Northern Region, Uganda.

Styles of Sanctus Lino Wanok
- Reference style: His Eminence
- Spoken style: Your Eminence
- Religious style: Monsignor

Sanctus Lino Wanok was born 7 April 1957 at Ukuru Pamach Village, Zombo District, in the West Nile sub-region, in the Northern Region of Uganda. He serves as the bishop of the Roman Catholic Diocese of Lira, since 9 February 2019. Before then, from 8 February 2011 until 9 February 2019, he was the bishop of the Roman Catholic Diocese of Nebbi. He was appointed bishop by Pope Benedict XVI. He was consecrated and installed at Nebbi on 30 April 2011. On 23 November 2018, Pope Francis transferred him to Lira, Uganda and appointed him as bishop there. He was installed at Lira on 9 February 2019.

== Priesthood ==
He was ordained a deacon on 31 August 1986 at Edofe Roman Catholic Cathedral, Arua. He was ordained priest on 27 September 1986 at Arua by Bishop Frederick Drandua. He earned a degree in canon law from the Pontifical Urban University in Rome. He was appointed bishop of the Catholic Diocese of Nebbi on 8 February 2011, by Pope Benedict XVI and ordained bishop on 30 April 2011 at Nebbi.

He was appointed Bishop of the Diocese of Lira on 23 November 2018 by Pope Francis and installed as the fourth Bishop of Lira on 9 February 2019 at Lira, succeeding Bishop Giuseppe Franzelli, who had reached the mandatory retirement age of 75 years.

Archbishop Raphael p'Mony Wokorach is the new Chairman of Uganda Martyrs University's Governing Council succeeding Bishop Wanok who served for 8 years. In June 2023, he was unveiled at Pope Paul Memorial Hotel, Lubaga.

== See also ==
- Uganda Martyrs
- Roman Catholicism in Uganda

== Succession table ==
Catholic Church titles
Preceded by Giuseppe Franzelli (1 April 2005 - 23 November 2018)	Bishop of Lira (since 23 November 2018)	Succeeded by Incumbent
Preceded by Martin Luluga (2 January 1999 - 8 February 2011)	Bishop of Nebbi (8 February 2011 - 23 November 2018)	Succeeded by Raphael p'Mony Wokorach (31 March 2021 - 22 March 2024)
