= Sabino Ocan Odoki =

Ugandan prelate

The Most Reverend Sabino Ocan Odoki
- Bishop of Arua
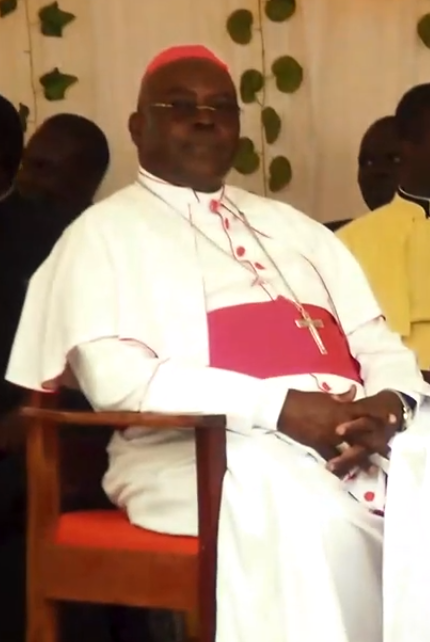
- Bishop Odoki in 2024
- Church: Roman Catholic Church
- Archdiocese: Roman Catholic Archdiocese of Gulu
- See: Roman Catholic Diocese of Arua
- Appointed: 20 October 2010
- Predecessor: Frederick Drandua
- Successor: Incumbent
- Previous posts: Auxiliary Bishop of Gulu, Uganda (2006 - 2010)

Orders
- Ordination: 10 September 1983
- Consecration: 21 October 2006 by John Baptist Odama
- Rank: Bishop

Personal details
- Born: Sabino Ocan Odoki; 8 August 1957 (age 69) Layibi Village, Gulu District, Uganda

Styles of Sabino Ocan Odoki
- Reference style: The Most Reverend
- Religious style: Bishop

Sabino Ocan Odoki (born 8 August 1957), is a Roman Catholic prelate, who serves as the Bishop of the Roman Catholic Diocese of Arua, in Uganda. He was installed as Bishop of Arua on 18 December 2010.

== Background and education ==
He was born at Layibi Village, Gulu District, in the Acholi sub-region, in the Northern Region of Uganda, on 8 August 1957.

He attended Holy Rosary Primary School, in Gulu. He was then admitted to Aboke Minior Seminary in Aboke, Kole District for two years. He continued with minor seminary at Lacor Minor Seminary, in Gulu, for another two years, completing there in 1975.

In 1976, he was admitted to Katigondo National Major Seminary, in present-day Kalungu District, to study Philosophy, spending there three years. In 1980, he transferred to the Ggaba National Major Seminary, in Ggaba, Kampala, where he studied Theology, for the next three years.

He was admitted to the Catholic University of Eastern Africa, in Nairobi, Kenya, where he graduated with a Licentiate of Sacred Theology and a Doctor of Sacred Theology in 1987 and 1992, respectively.

== As priest ==
He was ordained priest on 10 September 1983 at Gulu Roman Catholic Cathedral, in Gulu. He served as priest of the Archdiocese of Gulu until 22 July 2006. Following his ordination, he served in various pastoral and administrative roles within the archdiocese.

== As bishop ==
He was appointed auxiliary bishop of the Roman Catholic Archdiocese of Gulu on 22 July 2006, by Pope Benedict XVI and ordained bishop on 21 October 2006 at Gulu, by John Baptist Odama, Archbishop of Gulu, assisted by Emmanuel Cardinal Wamala, Cardinal-Priest of Sant’Ugo and Archbishop Christophe Pierre, the Apostolic Nuncio in Uganda at the time.

He was appointed the Apostolic Administrator of Arua Diocese, on 19 August 2009 by Pope Benedict XVI and confirmed as the Bishop of Arua Diocese. He was installed as Bishop of Arua Diocese on 18 December 2010, at Ediofe Cathedral, Arua.

On 20 October 2010, he was appointed Bishop of the Diocese of Arua and was installed on 18th December 2010 at Ediofe Cathedral.

He succeeded Bishop Frederick Drandua as the third bishop of the Diocese of Arua.

== Personal life ==
Sabino Ocan Odoki is known for his pastoral leadership and commitment to missionary work in north-western Uganda. In 2023,he celebrated 40 years of priest at Ediofe Cathedral in Arua Diocese.

== See also ==
- Uganda Martyrs
- Roman Catholicism in Uganda
- Roman Catholic Archdiocese of Gulu
- Roman Catholic Diocese of Arua

== Succession table ==
Preceded by Frederick Drandua (1986 - 2009)	Bishop of Arua; 2010 - present	Succeeded by Incumbent
