= Anthony Paul Aliddeki Musaala =

- Born: 1964 (age 61–62); Republic of Ireland
- Other name: Faaza Musaala
- Citizenship: Ugandan
- Education: Allen Hall Seminary; St Mary's College, Kisubi
- Occupations: Roman Catholic priest; gospel musician; preacher
- Years active: 1994–present
- Known for: Gospel music and Catholic ministry

Anthony Paul Aliddeki Musaala also known as Faaza Musaala (born 1964) is a Ugandan Roman Catholic priest, gospel musician and preacher.

== Early life and education ==
Musaala was born in 1964 to Paul Mulaga and Josephine Muinda in the Republic of Ireland, where his family was living at the time.He attended Savio Junior School for his primary education and later attended St Mary's College, Kisubi. Following his expulsion from the school, he completed his Ordinary Level education at St Charles Lwanga Secondary School in Koboko.

== Priesthood ==
In the 1980, Musaala travelled to England, where he got to know Basil Cardinal Hume, then Archbishop of Westminster. Hume later influenced his decision to pursue Catholic priesthood, and Musaala joined Allen Hall Seminary in London. He was ordained a Roman Catholic priest on 19 March, 1994 by Cardinal Basil Hume at Allen Hall Seminary in London. After his ordination, Musaala served in several parishes in England before requesting to return to Uganda to continue his ministry.

== Suspension from priestly ministry ==
On 19 March 2013, the Archbishop of Kampala, Cyprian Kizito Lwanga, suspended Musaala from celebrating the sacraments and from exercising certain powers of governance while an investigation was conducted. The suspension followed the publication of a document attributed to Musaala in which he discussed alleged sexual misconduct among some Catholic clergy and questioned the discipline of priestly celibacy.

== Brazilian Catholic Apostolic Church ==
In 2016, Musaala announced that he had joined the Brazilian Catholic Apostolic Church followed by an invitation from Archbishop Leonard Lubega. The Roman Catholic Church treated his move as an act of separation from the Church. Musaala later expressed a desire to reconcile with the Roman Catholic Church.

== Readmission to the Roman Catholic Church ==
In March 2018, Musaala was readmitted to the Roman Catholic Church during a liturgical celebration at Rubaga Cathedral. During the ceremony, he publicly sought forgiveness and renewed his relationship with the Catholic Church.

== Leadership and ministry roles ==
Musaala served as a youth chaplain at Gaba Parish and later served as the Youth Chaplain at St. Matia Mulumba Parish, Old Kampala. After his return to active Catholic ministry, he was appointed chaplain of the university's Rubaga campus. He was also appointed to serve as the Assistant Chaplain at Rubaga Cathedral in 2020 and he is a leader of Gospel Groovers.

== Music and compositions ==
Musaala is known for combining Catholic ministry with gospel music where by plays the keyboard and guitar. He has composed several songs including Bariki, Koona Endongo ya Yesu and Tusimbe Ffenna Mu Kisinde.

== Awards and honors ==
In 2005, Musaala won the Best Gospel Artiste award with his song Tusimbe mu Kisinde voted for as the Best Song of the Year and in 2006, his song Koona Endongo ya Yezu won the best gospel hit at the 2006 PAM Awards. In addition, Musaala was a Pearl of Africa Music Award winner in the gospel category in 2007.

== See also ==
- Joseph Kiwanuka
- Emmanuel Kiwanuka Nsubuga
- Albert Edward Baharagate Akiiki
- Egidio Nkaijanabwo
