= Giuseppe Franzelli =

Italian priest

- Bishop Emeritus of Lira
- Church: Roman Catholic Church
- Archdiocese: Roman Catholic Archdiocese of Gulu
- See: Roman Catholic Diocese of Lira
- Appointed: 1 April 2005
- Term ended: 23 November 2018
- Predecessor: Joseph Oyanga
- Successor: Sanctus Lino Wanok

Orders
- Ordination: 11 March 1967
- Consecration: 9 July 2005 by John Baptist Odama
- Rank: Bishop

Personal details
- Born: Giuseppe Franzelli; 9 April 1942 (age 82); Roccafranca, Italy

Giuseppe Franzelli (born 9 April 1942), is an Italian-born Roman Catholic priest who served as Bishop of the Roman Catholic Diocese of Lira, from 1 April 2005 until 23 November 2018.

== Background and priesthood ==
Franzelli was born in Roccafranca, Italy, on 9 April 1942. He professed as a member of the Comboni Missionaries of the Heart of Jesus (MCCI), in 1963. He was ordained to the priesthood on 11 March 1967.

== As bishop ==
On 1 April 2005, he was appointed Bishop of Lira, Uganda. He was consecrated bishop by Archbishop John Baptist Odama, Archbishop of Gulu, assisted by Bishop Paul Lokiru Kalanda†, Bishop Emeritus of Fort Portal and Bishop Joseph Oyanga†, Bishop Emeritus of Lira. The consecration ceremony was held at the site where Akii Bua Stadium is under construction, in the city of Lira, in Lira District, Lango sub-region, in the Northern Region of Uganda. He retired as bishop on 23 November 2018, at the age of 76 years and 7 months. As of July 2019, he is living as Bishop Emeritus of Lira, Uganda.

== See also ==
- Uganda Martyrs
- Roman Catholicism in Uganda

== Succession table ==
Preceded by Joseph Oyanga (1989 - 2003)	Bishop of Lira; 2005 - 2018	Succeeded by Sanctus Lino Wanok (2018 - present)
