= Martin Luluga =

Roman Catholic prelate (1933–2022)

His Excellency Martin Luluga
- Bishop Emeritus of Nebbi
- Archdiocese: Gulu
- Diocese: Nebbi
- Appointed: 2 January 1999
- Term ended: 8 February 2011
- Predecessor: John Baptist Odama
- Successor: Sanctus Lino Wanok
- Previous posts: Auxiliary Bishop of Gulu and Titular Bishop of Aquae in Dacia (1986–1990); Bishop of Gulu (1990–1999)

Orders
- Ordination: 1 June 1963
- Consecration: 11 January 1987 by Cipriano Biyehima Kihangire

Personal details
- Born: 1 March 1933 Lodonga, Protectorate of Uganda
- Died: 30 July 2022 (aged 89) Nebbi, Uganda

Martin Luluga (1 March 1933 – 30 July 2022) was a Ugandan Roman Catholic prelate, who served as the Bishop of the Diocese of Nebbi. He was appointed bishop of Nebbi on 2 January 1999 and he retired on 8 February 2011.

== Early life and priesthood ==
Luluga was born on 1 March 1933, at Lodonga, in present-day Yumbe District in the West Nile sub-region, in the Northern Region of Uganda. He was ordained priest on 1 June 1963 at Arua. He served as priest in the Roman Catholic Diocese of Arua, until 17 October 1986.

== As bishop ==
He was appointed bishop on 17 October 1986, serving as Auxiliary Bishop of Gulu and as Titular Bishop of Aquae in Dacia. He was consecrated as bishop on 11 January 1987 at Gulu by Bishop Cipriano Biyehima Kihangire†, Bishop of Gulu, assisted by Bishop Cesare Asili†, of Lira and Bishop Frederick Drandua†, Bishop of Arua.

On 8 February 1990 he was appointed bishop of the Roman Catholic Archdiocese of Gulu, replacing Bishop Cipriano Biyehima Kihangire. He was appointed Bishop of Nebbi on 2 January 1999. He resigned as bishop on 8 February 2011.

== Illness and death ==
He died on the morning of 30 July 2022 at Nebbi, as Bishop Emeritus of Nebbi Roman Catholic Diocese. He was 89 years old.

== See also ==
- Uganda Martyrs
- Roman Catholicism in Uganda
- Serverus Jjumba

Catholic Church titles
Preceded by John Baptist Odama	Bishop of Nebbi; 1999–2011	Succeeded by Sanctus Lino Wanok
Preceded by Cipriano Biyehima Kihangire	Bishop of Gulu; 1990–1999	Succeeded by Post abolished
Preceded by Tomislav Jablanović	Titular Bishop of Aquae in Dacia; 1986–1990	Succeeded by Serafim Shyngo-Ya-Hombo
Preceded by —	Auxiliary Bishop of Gulu; 1986–1990	Succeeded by —
