= Vincent Kirabo =

Ugandan Roman Catholic prelate (born 1955)

The Most Reverend Vincent Kirabo
- Bishop of Hoima
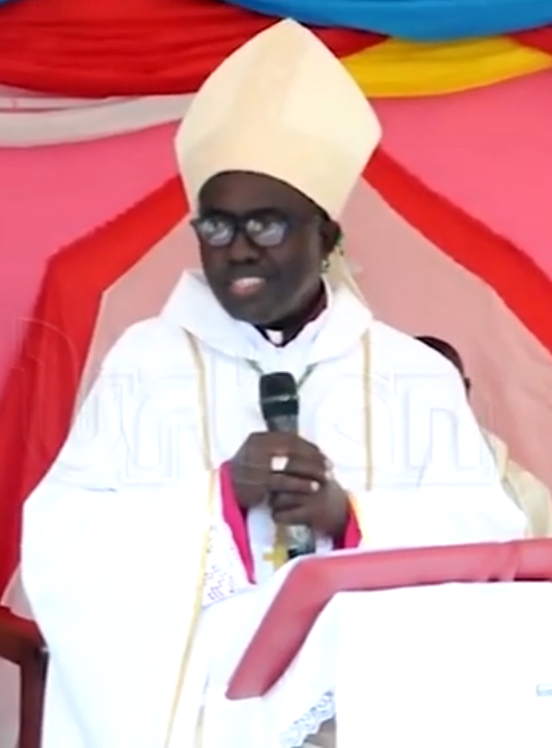
- Church: Catholic Church
- Archdiocese: Roman Catholic Archdiocese of Mbarara
- See: Roman Catholic Diocese of Hoima
- Appointed: 30 November 2015
- Installed: 28 February 2016
- Predecessor: Deogratias Muganwa Byabazaire

Orders
- Ordination: 9 September 1979
- Consecration: 28 February 2016 by Paul Kamuza Bakyenga

Personal details
- Born: Vincent Kirabo Amooti; 1 October 1955 (age 71) Kyanaisoke, Hoima District, Diocese of Hoima, Uganda

Styles of Vincent Kirabo Amooti
- Reference style: His Lordship
- Spoken style: My Lord
- Religious style: Monsignor

Vincent Kirabo Amooti (born 1 October 1955) is a Ugandan Roman Catholic prelate. He has been bishop of the Roman Catholic Diocese of Hoima since 30 November 2015. Before he was appointed bishop, he was a priest of the same diocese since 9 September 1979. He was appointed bishop by Pope Francis. He was consecrated and installed at Hoima on 28 February 2016.

== Background and education ==
He was born on 1 October 1955 in Kyanaisoke Village, Hoima District, in the Diocese of Hoima, in the Western Region of Uganda. He attended primary and secondary school in his home area. He studied philosophy at the Uganda Martyrs' National Major Seminary Alokolum in Gulu. He then studied theology at the Ggaba National Major Seminary, in Kampala. He graduated with a Master's degree in Education from the University of Portland in Portland, Oregon, United States. He also holds a licentiate in biblical theology awarded by the Pontifical Urban University in Rome.

== Priesthood ==
He was ordained a priest on 9 September 1979 for the Catholic Diocese of Hoima. He served as a priest until 30 November 2015. While a priest, he taught at St. John Bosco Minor Seminary in Hoima from 1979 to 1988. He served as the director of the Diocesan Commission for Vocations from 1985 until 1988. He was the vicar at Muhorro parish in 1990 and rector of St. John Bosco Minor Seminary in Hoima from 1991 to 1992. Between 1992 and 1997, he served as the diocesan financial administrator of Hoima Roman Catholic diocese. Between 1998 and 2003, he was the parish priest of Buseesa parish, serving in the same capacity in Katulikire parish from 2007 until 2008. He became professor and financial administrator of the Uganda Martyrs' National Major Seminary Alokolum in 2008, serving in that capacity until 2012. At the time of his appointment as bishop, he was a professor at Saint Mary's National Major Seminary Ggaba, a position he had served in since 2012.

== Bishop ==
Kirabo was appointed bishop by Pope Francis on 30 November 2015 and was consecrated as Bishop of Hoima on 28 February 2016 by Archbishop Paul Kamuza Bakyenga, Archbishop of Mbarara, assisted by Bishop Albert Edward Baharagate, Bishop Emeritus of Hoima, and Bishop Lambert Bainomugisha, Auxiliary Bishop of Mbarara and Titular Bishop of Tacia Montana.

== See also ==
- Catholic Church in Uganda
- Adrian Kivumbi Ddungu
- Serverus Jjumba

== Succession table ==
Catholic Church titles
Preceded by Deogratias Muganwa Byabazaire (9 March 1991 - 8 February 2014)	Bishop of Hoima (since 30 November 2015)	Succeeded by Incumbent
