= Parombo =

Town in Uganda

- Location in Uganda; Placement on map is approximate
- Coordinates: 02°18′13″N 31°12′11″E
- Country: Uganda
- Region: Northern Uganda
- District: Nebbi District
- Municipality: Parombo
- Elevation: 3,179 ft (969 m)

Parombo is a town in the West Nile sub-region of the Northern Region of Uganda.

== Location ==
Parombo is located in Padyere County, Parombo Town Council, in Nebbi District, in northwestern Uganda. It is approximately 12 kilometres (7 mi), by road, north of the international border with the Democratic Republic of the Congo. This location is approximately 34 kilometres (21 mi), by road, southeast of Nebbi, where the district headquarters are located. The geographical coordinates of Parombo are:02°18'13.0"N, 31°12'11.0"E (Latitude:2.303611; Longitude:31.203056). Parombo sits at an average elevation of 969 metres (3,179 ft) above sea level.

== Overview ==
Parombo is divided into six administrative divisions; namely (a) Parwo (b) Pagwata (c) Ossi (d) Padel (e) Pangarere and (f) Pulum. The growing urban area has a town board.

== Population ==
The national population census and household survey, carried out on 27 August 2014, enumerated the population of Parombo Subcounty at 41,286 people. This population is mainly rural and the urban centre is a much smaller fraction of the sub-county. The majority of inhabitants of the sub-county and the town are the Alur people.

== Challenges ==
Two of the most challenging issues for Parombo are water scarcity and poor sanitation. The water crisis in Parombo and surrounding communities dates back for nearly two decades. The town and surrounding areas have protected springs, shallow wells and boreholes from which they collect water for animal and human use. But these infrastructure developments do not meet all the area's water needs.

In 2018, National Water and Sewerage Corporation (NWSC) was tasked to establish a piped water system in Parombo Town Council and in the surrounding communities. Work is continuing, although initial attempts to locate a suitable water source have been unsuccessful.

Due to the absence of a centralized sewerage disposal system, sanitation remains a challenge as sometimes sewage contaminates water sources for human consumption, as happened at Parombo Secondary School in March 2019.

== Notable people ==
- Constantine Rupiny: Bishop of Roman Catholic Diocese of Nebbi (Appointed 26 November 2024). He was born here on 10 November 1974.
