= Gaetano Batanyenda =

Ugandan religious leader

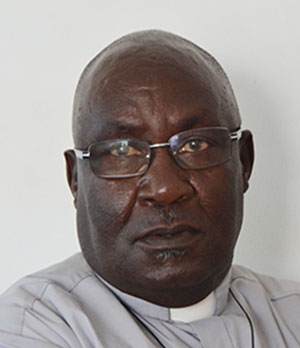
- Born: June 30, 1944 (age 82); Kanungu, Uganda
- Occupation: Catholic priest
- Years active: 1974–2024
- Known for: Religious leadership, social activism
- Title: Reverend Father

Reverend Father Gaetano Batanyenda (born 30 June 1944) is an Ugandan Catholic priest who served as one of the longest-serving church leaders in the Kabale Diocese. Born in Kanungu, Uganda, Batanyenda became a significant figure in both religious and political discourse in southwestern Uganda, serving as head of the Kigezi Inter Religious Council and maintaining a prominent voice in social and political matters.

== Early life and ordination ==
Batanyenda was born on 30 June 1944 in Kanungu, Uganda. He was ordained as a Catholic priest and began his ecclesiastical career in the Kabale Diocese, where he would spend the majority of his ministry. His career spanned five decades, from 1974 to 2024.

== Ministry and leadership ==
Batanyenda served as the parish priest of Kitanga Catholic Parish for 25 years, making him one of the longest-serving church leaders in the Kabale Diocese. He also led the Kigezi Inter Religious Council, facilitating interfaith dialogue and cooperation in the region.

Throughout his career, Batanyenda also served as the speaker of Kabale District Council, engaging in matters of local governance and community affairs.

== Political activism and social commentary ==
Batanyenda emerged as a vocal advocate for political engagement by religious leadership. In 2011, he published a letter urging president Yoweri Museveni to resign. In 2020, he urged fellow clergy to participate in political campaigns to guide Ugandans in choosing better political leaders ahead of the 2021 General Election, stating: "Don't bow to intimidation. We don't draw our calling from politicians."

His outspoken nature extended to calls for systemic change in Uganda's political structure. In 2022, Batanyenda advocated for the abolition of political parties in Uganda, particularly in higher education institutions, arguing that their presence contributed to violence and instability.

== Relationship with government and controversy ==
Despite his affiliation with the ruling National Resistance Movement (NRM) party, Batanyenda maintained an independent stance on various political issues. In 2015, he joined Bishop Zac Niringiye in calling upon Ugandans to recognize historical patterns of governance and divine intervention in Uganda's political development.

His critical stance toward government policies occasionally placed him at odds with political authorities. Security briefings in 2021 suggested that critical church leaders, including Batanyenda, faced potential government surveillance and intimidation efforts.

== Retirement and legacy ==
In March 2024, at the age of 80, Reverend Father Gaetano Batanyenda retired from active priesthood after 50 years of service to the Catholic Church. Batanyenda's legacy encompasses the potential for religious leaders to engage constructively with political processes while maintaining their spiritual mandate.

== See also ==
- Catholic Church in Uganda
- Christianity in Uganda
- Religion in Uganda
- Egidio Nkaijanabwo
