= St. Joseph's Cathedral, Gulu =

Roman Catholic Cathedral in Gulu, Uganda

St. Joseph's Cathedral
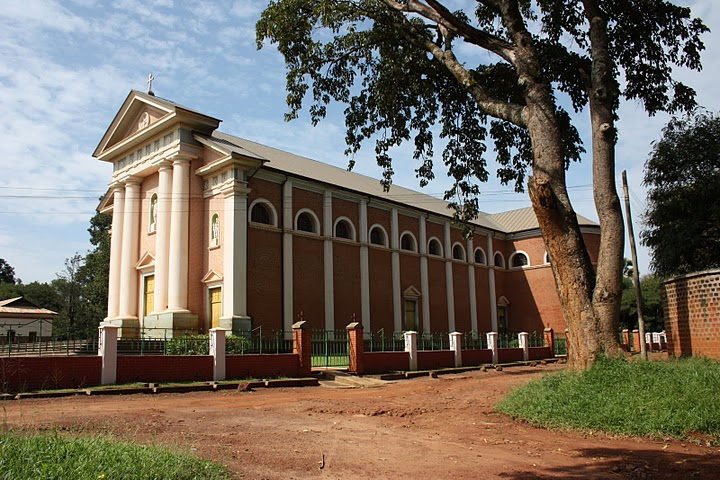
- The cathedral seen from the road to St. Jude's

Religion
- Affiliation: Catholicism
- Region: African Great Lakes
- Ecclesiastical or organisational status: Cathedral
- Leadership: Archbishop
- Year consecrated: 1947
- Status: Active

Location
- Location: Gulu, Uganda
- State: Uganda
- Interactive map of St. Joseph's Cathedral
- Coordinates: 2.76°N 32.26°E

Architecture
- Groundbreaking: 1931
- Completed: 1941

St. Joseph's Cathedral is a Roman Catholic cathedral in Gulu, Gulu District, Uganda. It is the seat of Archbishop John Baptist Odama, head of the Roman Catholic Archdiocese of Gulu.

== History ==
Construction of the 5 000-seat cathedral, organized by the Comboni Missionary Brothers, was a massive effort. Brother Attilio Consolaro supervised the work from the beginning to the end, and in honor of this achievement, a street in Rome was named after him.

The work was started in the year 1931 and completed in 1941. The Brotherhoodmade and baked 800 000 bricks at the Oyitino River, from where Christians and Catechumens every Sunday after the Mass carried bricks on their heads to the site of building. The cathedral was consecrated on 13 June 1947, the Feast of the Sacred Heart of Jesus.

On 24 December 1938, while the work was still in progress, the first two priests from the Northern Region were ordained: Rev. Frs John Oῃom and Donasyano Bala.

The remains of Bishops Angelo Negri and Cipriano Biyehima Kihangire were laid to rest in this cathedral. In 1994 the original roof with iron sheets was replaced by a roof of copper.

On 6 February 1993, Pope John Paul II entered the cathedral to adore the Holy Eucharist as thousands of people turned up to see him.

In 2000, the original floor was replaced by a new one. The interior and the exterior were redecorated in 2000 and 2001. From its establishment, it was run by the Comboni Missionaries up to 2006. The first diocesan priest to be a pastor of this cathedral was Fr. Gaudensio Langol Olango from 2007 to 2008, when he died in a road accident along Gulu–Kampala Highway.

== See also ==
- Lubaga Cathedral
- Basilica of the Uganda Martyrs, Namugongo
