= Diocese of Nebbi =

Diocese of Nebbi may refer to the following ecclesiastical jurisdictions:

- Anglican Diocese of Nebbi (f. 1993), Northern Uganda
- Roman Catholic Diocese of Nebbi (f. 1996), Northern Uganda
