= Joseph Oyanga =

Ugandan Roman Catholic priest (1936–2018)

- Bishop Emeritus of Lira
- Church: Roman Catholic Church
- Archdiocese: Roman Catholic Archdiocese of Gulu
- See: Roman Catholic Diocese of Lira
- Appointed: 4 July 1989
- Term ended: 2 December 2003
- Predecessor: Cesare Asili
- Successor: Giuseppe Franzelli

Orders
- Ordination: 15 May 1963
- Consecration: 1 October 1989 by Emmanuel Kiwanuka Nsubuga
- Rank: Bishop

Personal details
- Born: Joseph Oyanga; 28 February 1936 Omararii Village, Omoro Sub-county, Alebtong District, Alebtong District, Uganda
- Died: 21 July 2018 (aged 82) St. Anthony's Hospital, Tororo, Uganda

Joseph Oyanga (28 February 1936 – 21 July 2018), was a Ugandan Roman Catholic priest who served as the Bishop of the Roman Catholic Diocese of Lira from 4 July 1989 until 2 December 2003.

== Background and priesthood ==
He was born in Omararii Village, Omoro sub-county in present-day Alebtong District, in Lango sub-region, in the Northern Region of Uganda. Oyanga was ordained to the priesthood in Lira, on 15 May 1963. He served as priest in Lira Diocese until 4 July 1989.

== As bishop ==
He was appointed Bishop of Lira Diocese on 4 July 1989. Oyanga was consecrated bishop on 1 October 1989 at Lira by Cardinal Emmanuel Kiwanuka Nsubuga†, Archbishop of Roman Catholic Archdiocese of Kampala assisted by Bishop James Odongo, Bishop of the Diocese of the Uganda Military and Bishop Erasmus Desiderius Wandera, Bishop of Soroti.

Oyanga retired in 2003 and was succeeded by Joseph Franzeli.

Joseph Oyanga died as Bishop Emeritus, Diocese of Lira, on 21 July 2018 at St. Anthony's Hospital, in the town of Tororo, in the Roman Catholic Archdiocese of Tororo. Oyanga was laid to rest at Lira Diocese Bishop grounds on 26th July 2018.

== See also ==
- Uganda Martyrs
- Roman Catholicism in Uganda
- Robert Marie Gay
- John Francis Greif

== Succession table ==
Preceded by Cesare Asili (1968 - 1988)	Bishop of Lira; 1989 - 2003	Succeeded by Giuseppe Franzelli (2005 - 2018)
