= Our Lady Queen of Poland Catholic Church =

- Our Lady Queen of Poland Catholic Church
- 1°40′38″N 31°32′29″E
- Country: Uganda
- Denomination: Roman Catholic

Administration
- Diocese: Roman Catholic Diocese of Hoima

Our Lady Queen of Poland Catholic Church is a Catholic church in Nyabyeya near Masindi, Uganda. The church is within the Roman Catholic Diocese of Hoima.

== History and description ==
The church was built between 1943 and 1945 by Polish refugees living there, at the foot of the mountain called Wanda Mountain. On the building there is inscription in four languages (Polish, English, Latin and Swahili): This church is dedicated to the Blessed Virgin Mary, Queen of Polish Crown, built by Polish exiles while wandering to the free Fatherland, above the entrance there is the Polish coat of arms and the inscription: Poloniae semper Fidelis. In the interior of the church there is an icon of Our Lady of Częstochowa and Stations of the Cross have subtitles in Polish. The church served Poles living there until the closing of the refugee camp in 1948.

Next to the church, which serves today's local population, there is a Polish cemetery, where over 40 gravestones remain, and a plaque with the words: Pray for Poles who died of 1939-1947. In 2010 the cemetery was renovated by students from Pedagogical University of Kraków.

== See also ==
- Catholic Church in Uganda
