= John Baptist Bashobora =

Ugandan Catholic priest, theologian, educator and exorcist

The Reverend John Baptist Bashobora STD
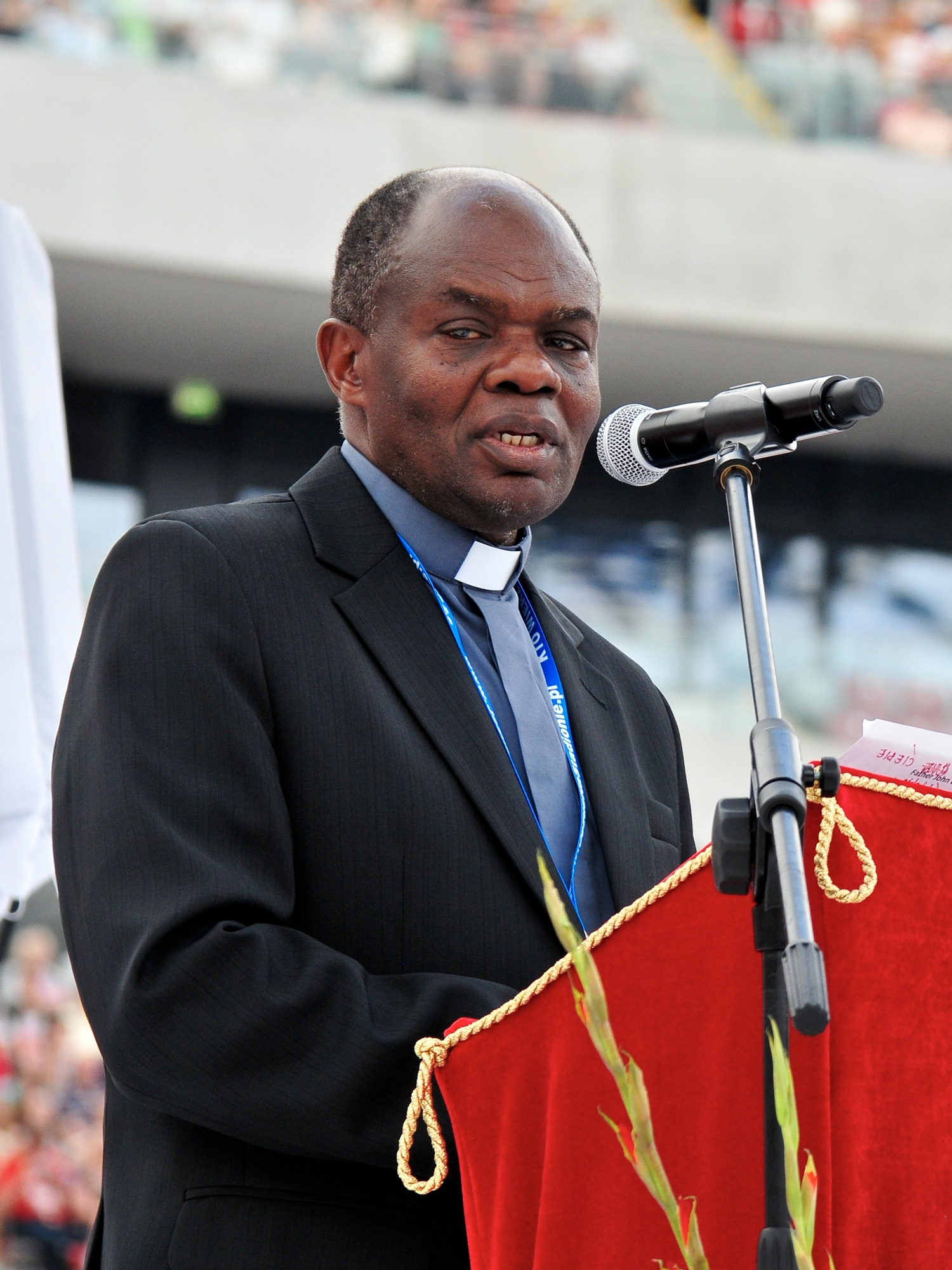
- John B. Bashobora in Warsaw, 2013
- Born: December 5, 1946 (age 79); Bushenyi, Uganda
- Education: Pontifical Gregorian University
- Occupations: Priest; university lecturer; retreat leader; exorcist
- Years active: 1972–present
- Known for: Running educational centers for children and youth, involvement in the Catholic Charismatic Renewal

Ecclesiastical career
- Church: Catholic
- Ordained: 1972
- Website: ojciecjohnbashobora.pl

John Baptist Rubara Bashobora, STD (born 5 December 1946) is a Ugandan Catholic priest, a doctor of spiritual theology, and founder of educational centers for children and youth.

== Biography ==
John Baptist Bashobora was born into a Catholic family in Bushenyi, Uganda on December 5, 1946. As a child, he was orphaned by his father, who was poisoned by his aunt. His mother was expelled. He was raised by his uncle's family until he reached adulthood. Bashobora learned that they were not his real parents only on the day of his ordination, at the age of 26.

== Surviving poison ==
His aunt also confessed that she had tried to poison him by feeding him poisoned porridge as a child, but the vessel shattered during the boy's prayer before the meal.[3]

At the age of 10, he entered a minor seminary; however, initially, he did not feel, as he himself repeatedly confessed, a priestly vocation. Being the son of a polygamist, he was unable to participate in preparation for the priesthood, as the sons of polygamists were not allowed to receive holy orders. After graduating from the minor seminary, where he met two charismatic priests from Canada, he decided to join the Congregation of the Holy Cross. He traveled to India to do so. However, he did not take religious vows and returned to Uganda. As a diocesan seminarian, he was ordained a priest in 1972. His superiors sent him to Rome for further studies. He earned his doctorate in spiritual theology from the Pontifical Gregorian University, writing a thesis on the discernment of spirits in the life of Ugandan Christians. Bashobora is also a psychologist by profession. While in Rome, he became involved with the Catholic Charismatic Renewal. Upon returning to his home diocese, he founded two primary schools, two secondary schools, and two orphanages, which cared for 5,000 orphans. He was the diocesan coordinator of the Catholic Charismatic Renewal in the Archdiocese of Mbarara and a member of the National Association of Intercessory Prayer. He also served as a diocesan exorcist. He was a lecturer at the Kinyamaskia National Major Seminary.

== As a retreat leader ==
Bashobora is a world-famous retreat leader and leader of charismatic prayer meetings. Since 2007, he led numerous retreats for organized groups in Poland. One of the largest retreats organized by Bashobora was the meeting at the National Stadium in Warsaw on July 6, 2013, attended by nearly 60,000 people.

In June 2012, Bashobora and his companions luckily survived an accident in Zembrzyce, Poland on the route from Sucha Beskidzka to Wadowice.

Father Bashobora is one of the main figures portrayed in the 2008 Polish documentary film Duch by Maciej Bodasiński and Lech Dokowicz.

== Selected publications ==
A number of Father Bashobora's teachings have been published in Polish in book form by the Missionaries of the Precious Blood Publishing House:

- Jesteś obrazem Boga
- Jesteśmy ambasadorami Boga na ziemi
- Uwierz Bogu sercem
- Jesteś posłany przez Boga
- Trwaj w relacji z Bogiem
- Zaufaj miłosierdziu Boga
- W małżeństwie doświadczajcie miłości Boga
