= Frederick Drandua =

Ugandan priest

- Bishop Emeritus of Arua
- Church: Roman Catholic Church
- Archdiocese: Roman Catholic Archdiocese of Gulu
- See: Roman Catholic Diocese of Arua
- Term ended: 19 August 2009
- Predecessor: Angelo Tarantino
- Successor: Sabino Ocan Odoki

Orders
- Ordination: 9 August 1970
- Consecration: 15 August 1986 by Emmanuel Kiwanuka Nsubuga
- Rank: Bishop

Personal details
- Born: Frederick Drandua; 12 August 1943 Uleppi, Arua District, Uganda
- Died: 1 September 2016 (aged 73) Kampala, Uganda

Frederick Drandua (12 August 1943 – 1 September 2016) was a Ugandan Roman Catholic priest, who served as the Bishop of the Roman Catholic Diocese of Arua, in Uganda, from 27 May 1986 until his retirement is on the 19 August 2009 due to poor health.

== Background and priesthood ==
Drandua was born in Uleppi, in present-day Ma'di-okollo District, in the West Nile sub-region, in the Northern Region of Uganda, on 12 August 1943. He was ordained priest on 9 August 1970. He served as priest of the Roman Catholic Diocese of Arua until 27 May 1986. As a Bishop Emeritus on August 19, 2009, due to poor health conditions. Bishop Drandua died a

== As bishop ==
He was appointed bishop by Pope John Paul II on 27 May 1986 and was consecrated as Bishop of Arua on 15 August 1986, by Cardinal Emmanuel Kiwanuka Nsubuga†, Archbishop of Kampala, assisted by Emmanuel Wamala, Bishop of Kiyinda-Mityana and Bishop Cesare Asili†, Bishop of Lira, Uganda.

Bishop Frederick Drandua resigned as Bishop of Arua on 19 August 2009, due to poor health.

He succumbed to cancer of the Esophagus on 1 September 2016, at St. Francis Hospital Nsambya, in Nsambya, Kampala, Uganda, at the age of 73 years. He was laid to rest on Wednesday September 8 2016 at Ediofe Cathedral although his family wished to bury him at ancestral home.

== See also ==
- Catholic Church in Uganda
- Emmanuel Kiwanuka Nsubuga
- List of Roman Catholic bishops in Uganda
- Uganda Martyrs
- Roman Catholic Diocese of Arua
- Roman Catholicism in Uganda

== Succession table ==
Preceded by Angelo Tarantino (1959 - 1984)	Bishop of Arua; 1986 - 2009	Succeeded by Sabino Ocan Odoki (2010 - present)
