= Francis Aquirinus Kibira =

Ugandan priest

- Bishop of Kasese
- Church: Catholic Church
- Diocese: Diocese of Kasese
- Appointed: 15 April 2014
- Predecessor: Egidio Nkaijanabwo

Orders
- Ordination: 23 September 1984
- Consecration: 12 July 2014 by Paul Kamuza Bakyenga

Personal details
- Born: 16 April 1958 (age 68) Kigoto-Bulyansungwe, Tooro Kingdom, Protectorate of Uganda, British Empire

Francis Aquirinus Kibira is a Roman Catholic priest, who is the Bishop of Kasese. He was appointed to that position on 15 April 2014.

== Early life and priesthood ==
Kibira was born on 16 April 1958 in the village of Kigoto-Buryansungwe, in Kamwenge District, in the Diocese of Fort Portal, in the Western Region of Uganda. He studied Philosophy at Katigondo National Major Seminary in Villa Maria, Kanungu District, Diocese of Masaka, from 1977 until 1980. He then studied Theology at Saint Mary's National Major Seminary Ggaba, Kampala, from 1981 until 1984.

He was ordained priest on 23 September 1984 at the Roman Catholic Diocese of Fort Portal. He served as priest in the Roman Catholic Diocese of Fort Portal, until 1985. He then served as a lecturer at Katigondo National Major Seminary in Masaka Diocese from 1985 until 1987.

In 1987, he left Uganda for Studies of Sacred Scripture at the Pontifical Biblical Institute in Rome, residing at the Pontifical College of St. Paul. He completed his studies in 1991. He returned to Uganda in 1992 and served as Lecturer and Dean of Studies at Saint Paul's National Major Seminary Kinyamasika in Fort Portal. Since 1995, until his appointment as bishop in 2014, he served as the Rector of St. Paul's National Seminary Kinyamasika, in Fort Portal.

== As bishop ==
He was appointed bishop on 15 April 2014. He was consecrated as bishop on 12 July 2014 at Kasese by Archbishop Paul Kamuza Bakyenga, Archbishop of Mbarara, assisted by Bishop Egidio Nkaijanabwo, Bishop Emeritus of Kasese and Bishop Paul Lokiru Kalanda, Bishop Emeritus of Fort Portal.

== See also ==
- Uganda Martyrs
- Roman Catholicism in Uganda

== Succession table ==
Preceded by Egidio Nkaijanabwo (1989 - 2014)	Bishop of Kasese; 2014 - present	Succeeded by Incumbent
