= Deogratias Muganwa Byabazaire =

Ugandan priest

- Bishop of Hoima
- Church: Roman Catholic Church
- Archdiocese: Roman Catholic Archdiocese of Mbarara
- See: Roman Catholic Diocese of Hoima
- Appointed: 21 May 1990
- Term ended: 8 February 2014
- Predecessor: Albert Edward Baharagate
- Successor: Vincent Kirabo

Orders
- Ordination: 9 August 1969
- Consecration: 18 August 1990 by Luis Robles Díaz
- Rank: Bishop

Personal details
- Born: Deogratias Muganwa Byabazaire; October 9, 1941 Karujubu, Masindi, Masindi District, Uganda
- Died: February 8, 2014 (aged 72)

Deogratias Muganwa Byabazaire (9 October 1941 – 8 February 2014), was a Roman Catholic priest who served as Bishop of the Roman Catholic Diocese of Hoima, from 21 May 1990 until 8 February 2014.

== Background and priesthood ==
Byabazaire was born on 9 October 1941, in a neighborhood called Karujubu, in the city of Masindi, in Masindi District, in the Bunyoro sub-region, in the Western Region of Uganda. He was ordained to the priesthood at Hoima on 9 August 1969 and served as priest in Hoima Diocese until 21 May 1990.

== As bishop ==
On 21 May 1990, Byabazaire was appointed coadjutor bishop of the Roman Catholic Diocese of Hoima. He was ordained bishop on 18 August 1990 by Archbishop Luis Robles Díaz, Titular Archbishop of Stephaniacum, assisted by Archbishop Emmanuel Wamala, Archbishop of Kampala Archdiocese and Bishop Albert Edward Baharagate, Bishop of Hoima.

On 9 March 1991, Byabazaire succeeded as diocesan bishop, following the resignation of Bishop Albert Edward Baharagate.

Bishop Byabazaire died in office on 8 February 2014, at the age of 72 years and four months. He is buried at Bujumbura Cathedral, in the city of Hoima, the seat of Hoima Catholic Diocese.

== See also ==
- Catholic Church in Uganda
- Uganda Martyrs

== Succession table ==
Preceded by Albert Edward Baharagate (1969 - 1991)	Bishop of Hoima; 1991 - 2014	Succeeded by Vincent Kirabo Amooti (2014 - present)
