= Cipriano Biyehima Kihangire =

Ugandan priest

- Archbishop Emeritus of Gulu
- Church: Roman Catholic Church
- Archdiocese: Roman Catholic Archdiocese of Gulu
- See: Roman Catholic Diocese of Gulu
- Appointed: 19 December 1968
- Term ended: 9 January 1988
- Predecessor: Giovanni Battista Cesana †
- Successor: Martin Luluga

Orders
- Ordination: 17 February 1951
- Consecration: 24 March 1963 by Guido Del Mestri
- Rank: Bishop

Personal details
- Born: Cipriano Biyehima Kihangire; March 19, 1918 Hoima District, Uganda
- Died: November 1, 1990 (aged 72)

Cipriano Biyehima Kihangire (19 March 1918 – 1 November 1990), was a Ugandan Roman Catholic priest who served as the Bishop of the Roman Catholic Archdiocese of Gulu, from 19 December 1968 until 9 January 1988.

Prior to that, he served as the Auxiliary Bishop of Gulu from 12 November 1962 until 20 January 1964, Bishop of the Diocese of the Uganda Military from 20 January 1964 until 5 January 1985 and Bishop of the Diocese of Hoima from 9 August 1965 until 19 December 1968.

== Background and priesthood ==
Kihangire was born on 19 March 1918, in present-day Hoima District, in the Bunyoro sub-region, in the Western Region of Uganda. He was ordained a priest on 17 February 1951 and served as a priest until 12 November 1962.

== As bishop ==
Kihangire was appointed Auxiliary Bishop of Gulu on 12 November 1962 and was consecrated a bishop on 24 March 1963 as Titular Bishop of Maura, by Archbishop Guido Del Mestri†, Titular Archbishop of Tuscamia assisted by Bishop Giovanni Battista Cesana, M.C.C.I.†, Bishop of Gulu and Bishop Angelo Tarantino, F.S.C.J.†, Bishop of Arua.

He served as auxiliary bishop of Gulu until 20 January 1964, when he was appointed Bishop of the Diocese of the Uganda Military. He served as the ordinary of the diocese until he resigned on 5 January 1985. He concurrently served as the Bishop of Hoima from 9 August 1965 until 19 December 1968.

On 19 December 1968, Kihangire was appointed Bishop of Gulu, serving in that capacity until he resigned on 9 January 1988. He died on 1 November 1990 as Bishop Emeritus of Gulu, Uganda, at the age of 72 years and 7 months.

== Succession table ==
| Preceded by Giovanni Battista Cesana, M.C.C.I.† (1950 - 1968) | Bishop of Gulu; 1968 - 1988 | Succeeded by Martin Luluga (1990 - 1999) |
