= Roman Catholic Diocese of Nebbi =

Diocese of the Catholic Church in Uganda

Coordinates: 2.4787°N 31.0832°E

Diocese of Nebbi Dioecesis Nebbiensis
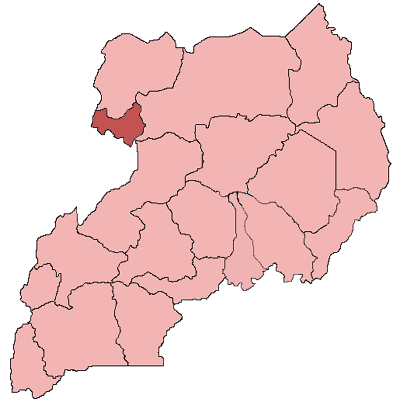
- Uganda - Diocesi di Nebbi

Location
- Country: Uganda
- Territory: Nebbi District, Zombo District, Pakwach District, Madi-Okollo District
- Ecclesiastical province: Gulu
- Metropolitan: Gulu

Statistics
- Area: 5,098 km^{2} (1,968 sq mi)
- Population: Total; Catholics: (as of 2004); 473,104; 403,104 (85.2%)

Information
- Denomination: Roman Catholic Church
- Rite: Roman Rite
- Established: February 23, 1996

Current leadership
- Pope: Leo XIV
- Bishop: Constantine Rupiny
- Metropolitan Archbishop: John Baptist Odama
- Bishops emeritus: Sanctus Lino Wanok (2018)

Website
- nebbicatholicdiocese.org

The Roman Catholic Diocese of Nebbi (Latin: Nebbensis) is a diocese of the Roman Catholic Church located in the city of Nebbi in northwestern Uganda. It is a suffragan diocese of the Roman Catholic Archdiocese of Gulu.

== History ==
The Diocese of Nebbi was established on February 23, 1996, when it was carved out from the Roman Catholic Diocese of Arua in northwestern Uganda, a region popularly known as West Nile. The diocese was originally part of the Gulu Apostolic Vicariate, which was established in 1923. When the diocese was first established, it was under the metropolitan see of Kampala. However, when the Ecclesiastical Province of Gulu was created in 1999, Nebbi became one of its suffragan dioceses, along with the dioceses of Arua and Lira. The establishment of Catholic missions in the area dates back to the early 20th century, with Angal Parish being considered the mother parish of the diocese, as it was the first parish established among the Alur people in West Nile.

== Bishops ==
=== Ordinaries ===
The diocese has had several bishops since its establishment:

- John Baptist Odama (1996-1999): The first ordinary of Nebbi Diocese, he received his episcopal ordination on May 26, 1996. He served as bishop until January 2, 1999, when he was appointed as the first Archbishop of Gulu.
- Martin Luluga (1999.01.02 – 2011.04.30)
- Sanctus Lino Wanok (2011-2018): He was ordained as a priest on February 23, 1996, and later appointed bishop of Nebbi on February 8, 2011, serving until November 23, 2018.
- Raphael p'Mony Wokorach (2018-2024): A member of the Comboni Missionaries (M.C.C.J.), he served as bishop and later as apostolic administrator from July 12, 2024, until his transfer in March 2024.
- Constantine Rupiny (2024-present): The current bishop was appointed on November 26, 2024. Prior to his appointment, he served as the rector of the Uganda Martyrs National Major Seminary.

=== Structure and administration ===
As a suffragan diocese of the Archdiocese of Gulu, Nebbi Diocese is part of the ecclesiastical province established in 1999 under the leadership of Archbishop John Baptist Odama, who had previously served as the first bishop of Nebbi. The diocese operates under the authority of the Roman Catholic Church and follows the Roman Rite. The diocese's motto "Service above humility" reflects its commitment to serving the local communities in northwestern Uganda.

== Territory ==
The Diocese of Nebbi covers a total land area of 5,098 square kilometers, encompassing four districts: Nebbi District, Zombo District, Pakwach District, and Madi-Okollo District (the latter being recently carved from Arua District).

== See also ==
- Catholic Church in Uganda
- Nebbi
- Roman Catholic Archdiocese of Gulu
- Roman Catholic Diocese of Arua
- List of Roman Catholic dioceses in Uganda
