= Uganda Martyrs' National Major Seminary Alokolum =

Ugandan Catholic educational institution

Alokolum National Major Seminary
- Type: Private, Seminary
- Established: 1973; 53 years ago
- Accreditation: Uganda Episcopal Conference; Uganda National Council for Higher Education
- Religious affiliation: Catholic
- Academic affiliations: Makerere University; Pontifical Urban University
- Location: Alookolum, Gulu District, Northern Region, Uganda; 02°45′26″N 32°13′38″E
- Website: alokolumseminary.ac.ug
- Location within Uganda

Alokolum National Major Seminary, (also Uganda Martyrs' National Major Seminary Alokolum) is a National Seminary of the Catholic Church in Uganda. The institution is a training facility and House of Formation under the auspices of the Uganda Episcopal Conference (UEC). The institution is also accredited by the Uganda National Council for Higher Education to teach some non-religious academic courses.

== Location ==
The seminary is located in Alokorum, a neighborhood in Gulu District outside the city of Gulu, the largest city in the Northern Region of Uganda. This is approximately 10 kilometres (6 mi) west of the central business district of Gulu City.

== Overview ==
Uganda Martyrs' National Major Seminary Alokolum opened on these current premises in 1973. It is owned and administered by the Uganda Episcopal Conference, comprising all 19 of the Roman Catholic bishops in the country. "The Seminary is led by a Rector, who is proposed by the Episcopal Conference of Uganda and appointed by the Holy See".

== Academics ==
The seminary offers studies primarily in philosophy. Candidates may graduate with a Certificate in Philosophical and Social Studies, or a Diploma in Philosophical and Social Studies on the Seminary letterheads. Upon passing a written and oral examination, candidates who meet specified criteria are awarded a Bachelor's Degree of Philosophy by the Pontifical Urban University in Rome, Italy. The seminary, in collaboration with Makerere University, awards the Bachelor of Arts degree in Social and Philosophical Studies.

== Rectors ==
As of March 2025, the immediate past Rector of Alokolum National Major Seminary was Bishop Constantine Rupiny who was appointed bishop of the Roman Catholic Diocese of Nebbi in November 2024.

== Notable alumni ==
- Bishop Constantine Rupiny, Bishop of Nebbi, Uganda.
- Bishop Charles Martin Wamika, Bishop of Jinja, Uganda (Deceased)
- Bishop Vincent Kirabo Amooti, Bishop of Hoima.
- Archbishop Raphael p'Mony Wokorach, Archbishop of Gulu, Uganda.
