= Roman Catholic Diocese of Kiyinda–Mityana =

Diocese of the Catholic Church in Uganda

Coordinates: 0.4007°N 32.0476°E

Diocese of Kiyinda–Mityana Dioecesis Kiyindaensis-Mityanaensis
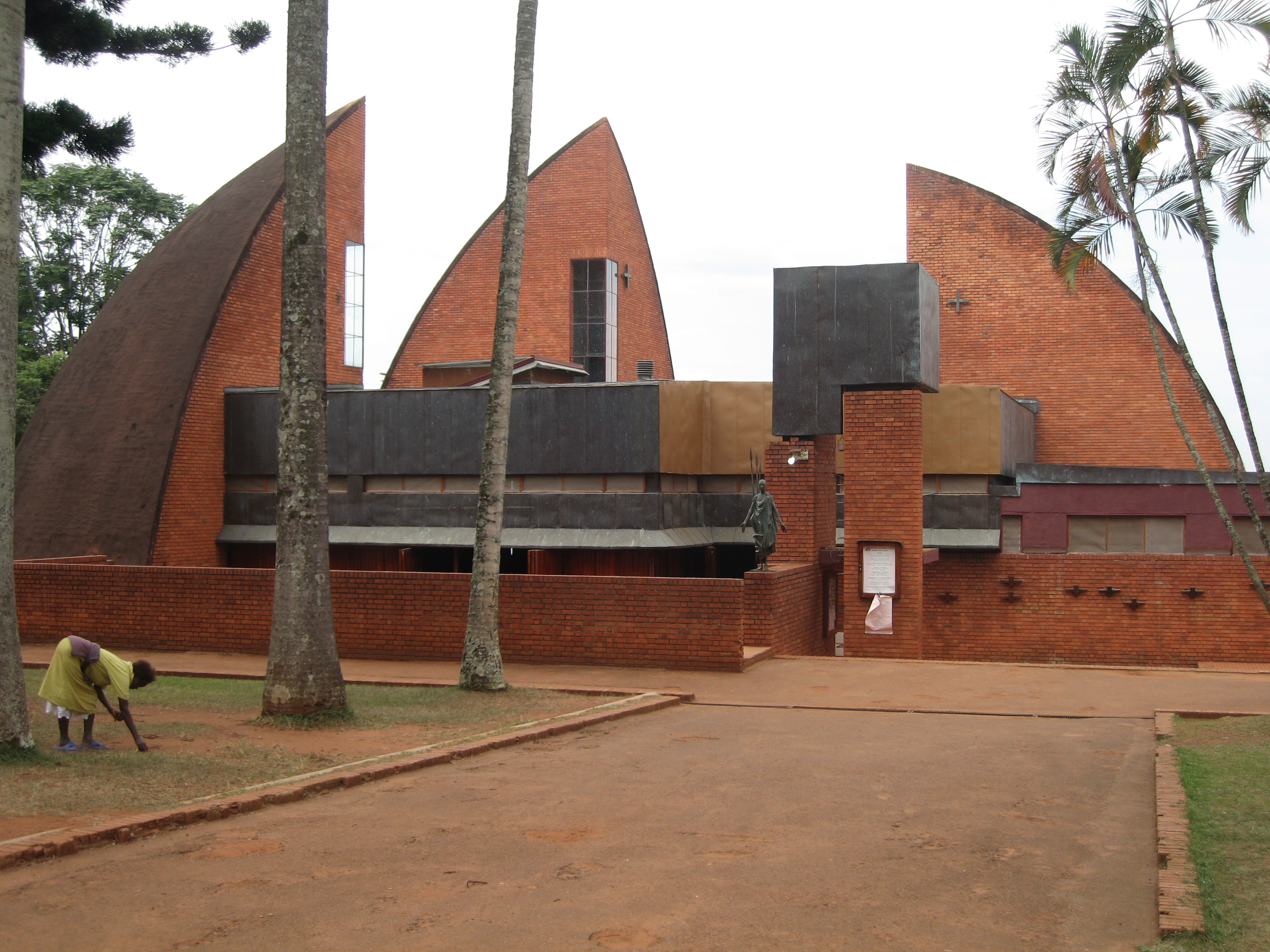
- St. Noa Mawaggali Cathedral

Location
- Country: Uganda
- Metropolitan: Roman Catholic Archdiocese of Kampala

Statistics
- Area: 11,965 km^{2} (4,620 sq mi)
- Population: Total; Catholics: (as of 2004); 829,488; 337,963 (40.7%)

Information
- Rite: Latin Rite

Current leadership
- Pope: Leo XIV
- Bishop: Joseph Anthony Zziwa

Map
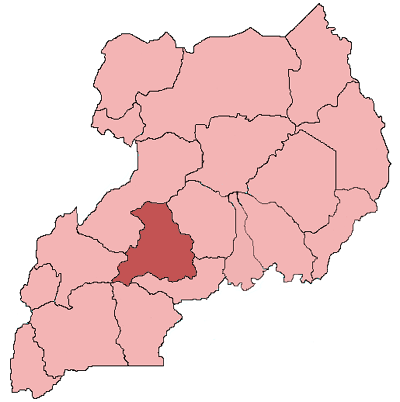
- Diocese of Kiyinda-Mityana

The Roman Catholic Diocese of Kiyinda–Mityana (Latin: Kiyindaën(sis) – Mityanaën(sis)) is a suffragan diocese of the Roman Catholic Archdiocese of Kampala in Uganda. Kiyinda and Mityana in

== History ==
- July 17, 1981: Established as Diocese of Kiyinda–Mityana from Metropolitan Archdiocese of Kampala

=== Construction of Cathedral ===
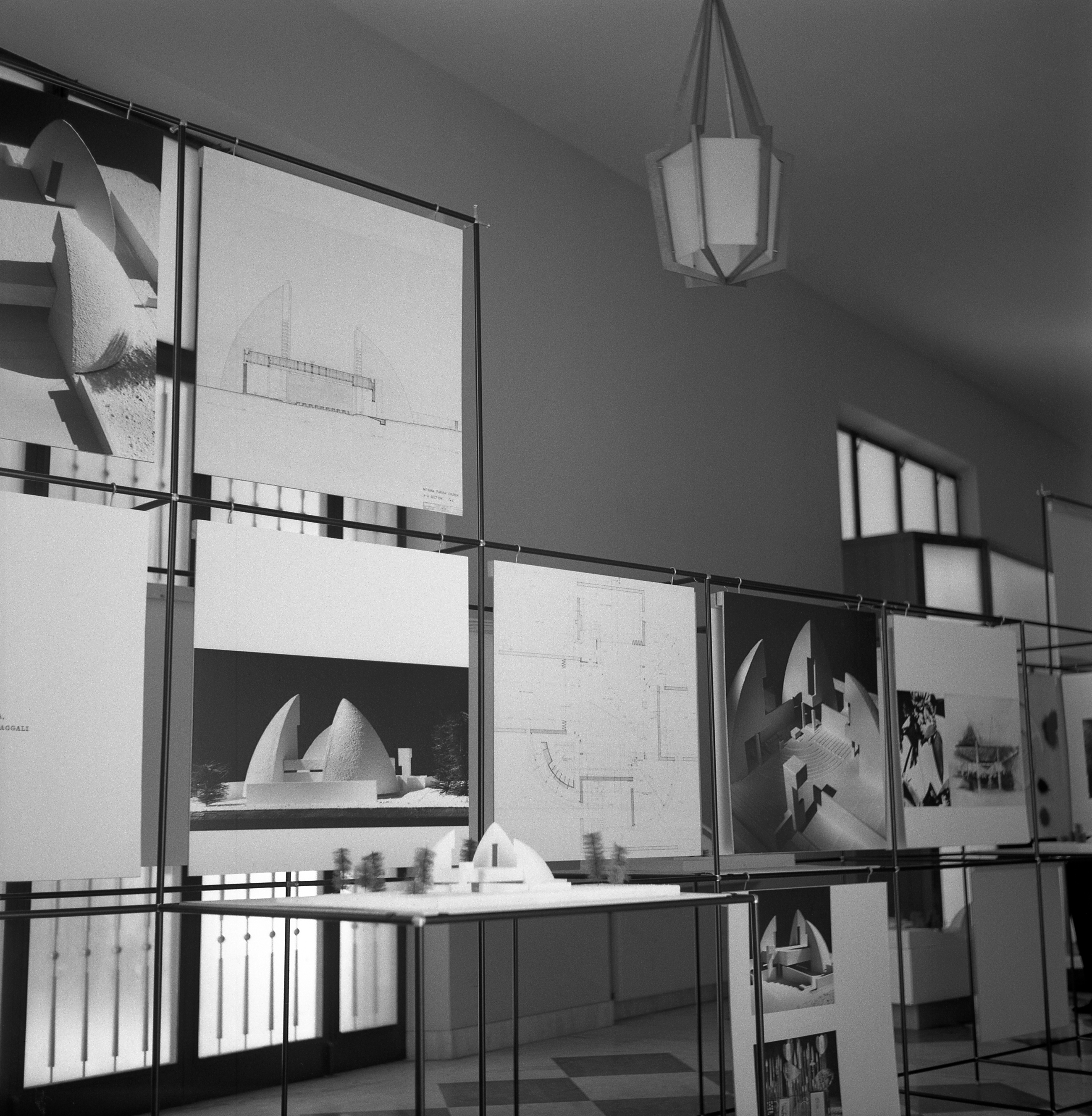
Display of plans of the proposed cathedral, Vatican City

The cathedral of St. Noa Mawaggali was constructed between 1963–65 based on the design of the Swiss architect Justus Dahinden.

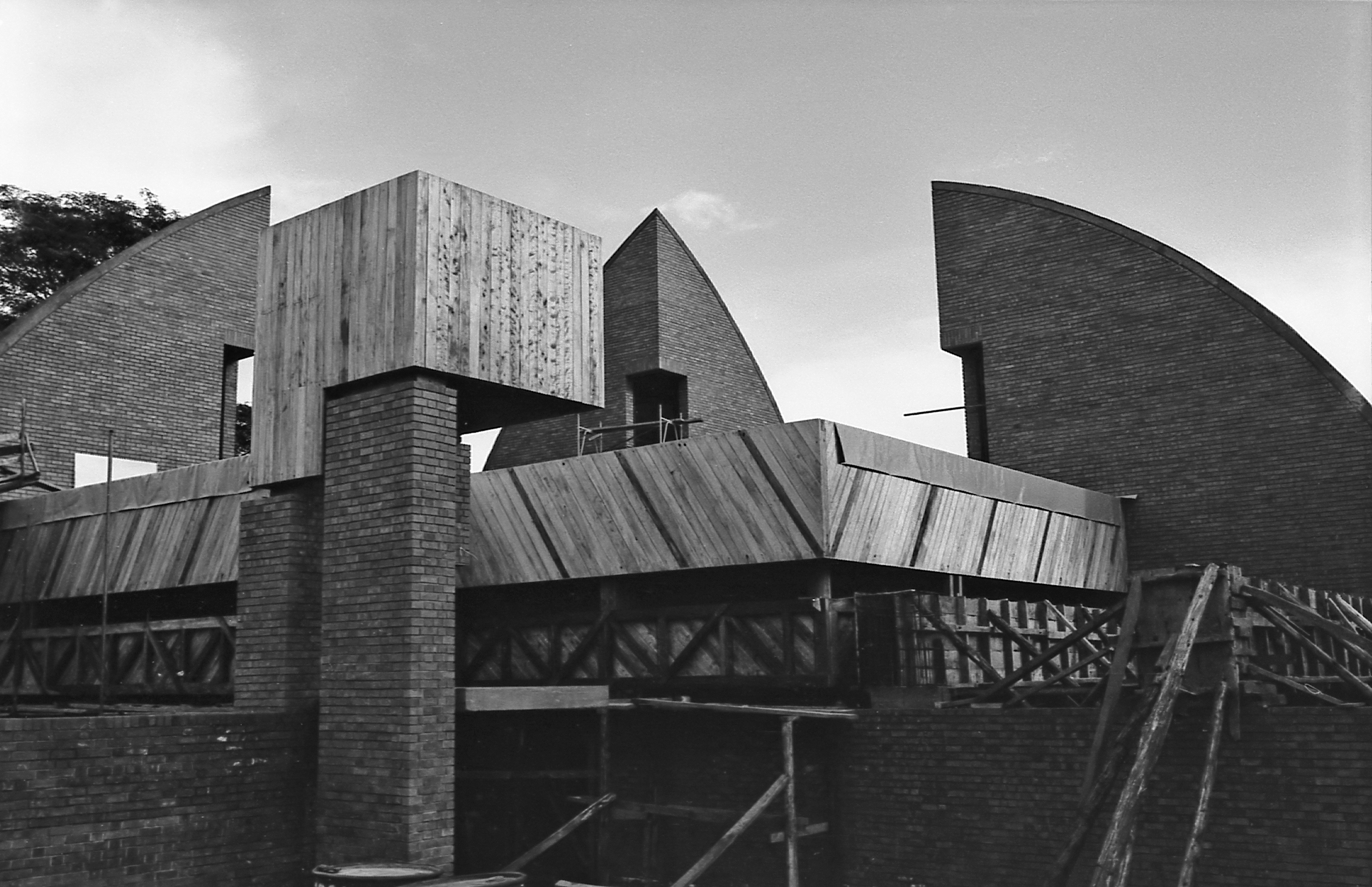

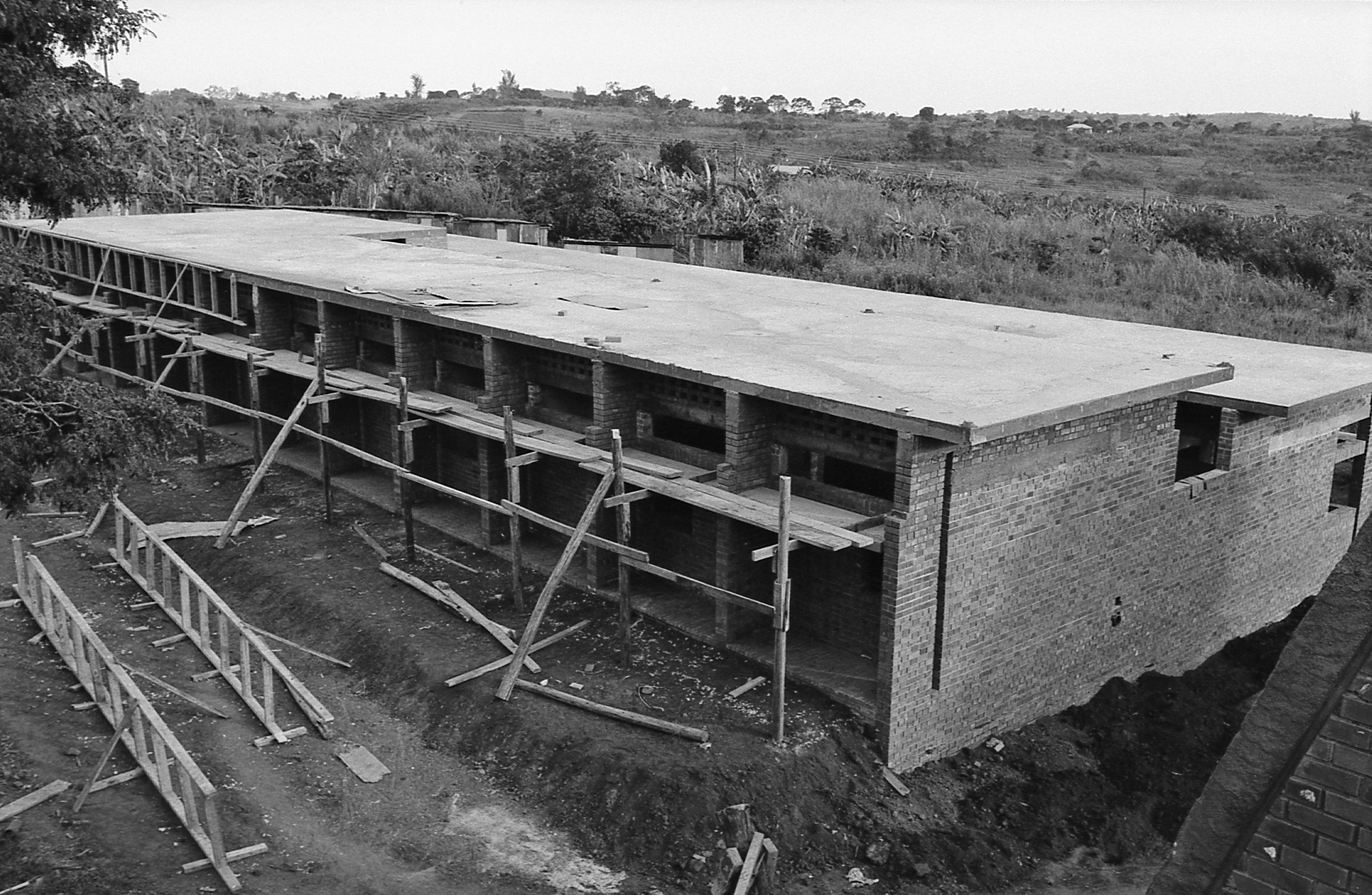

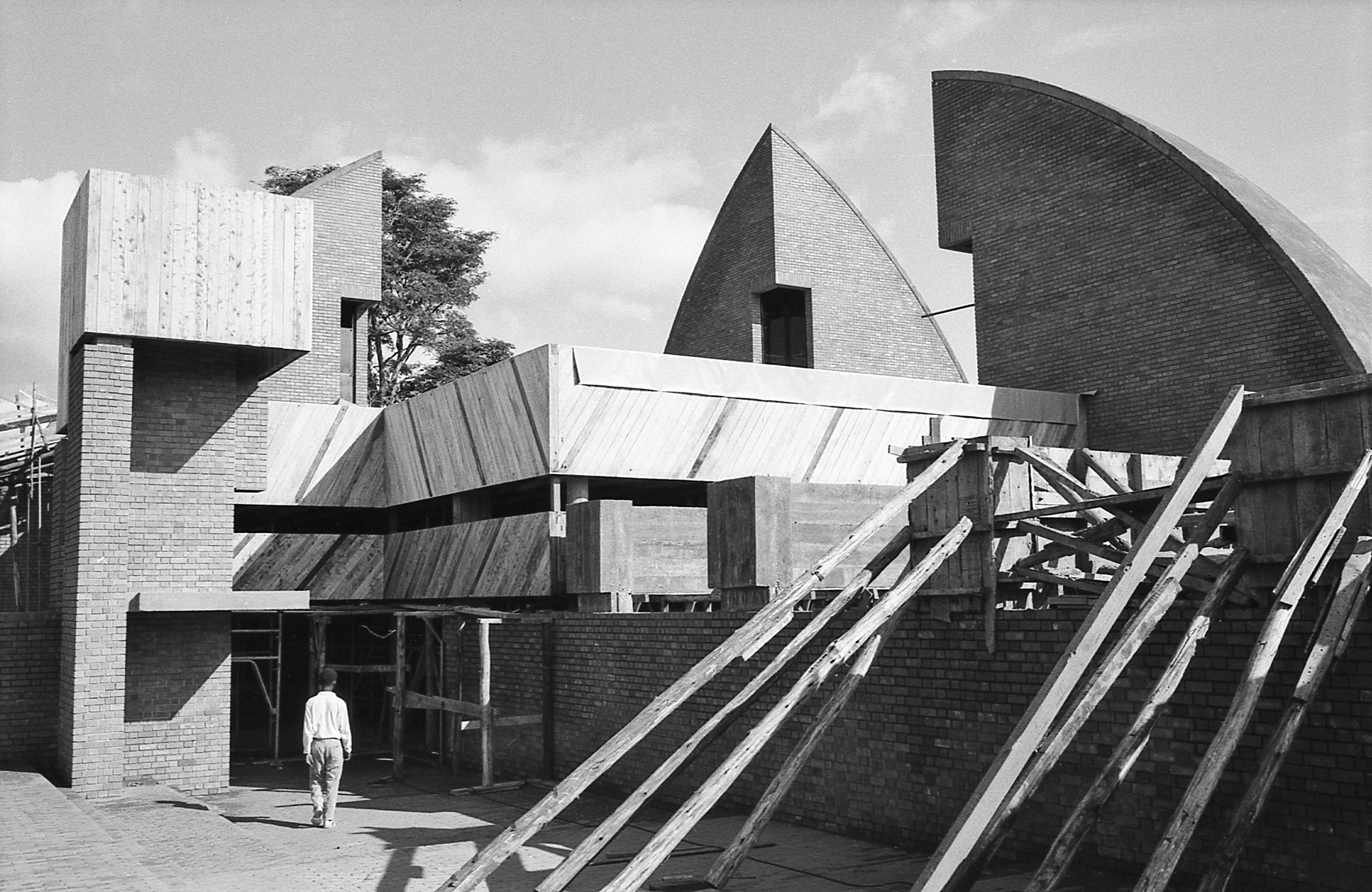

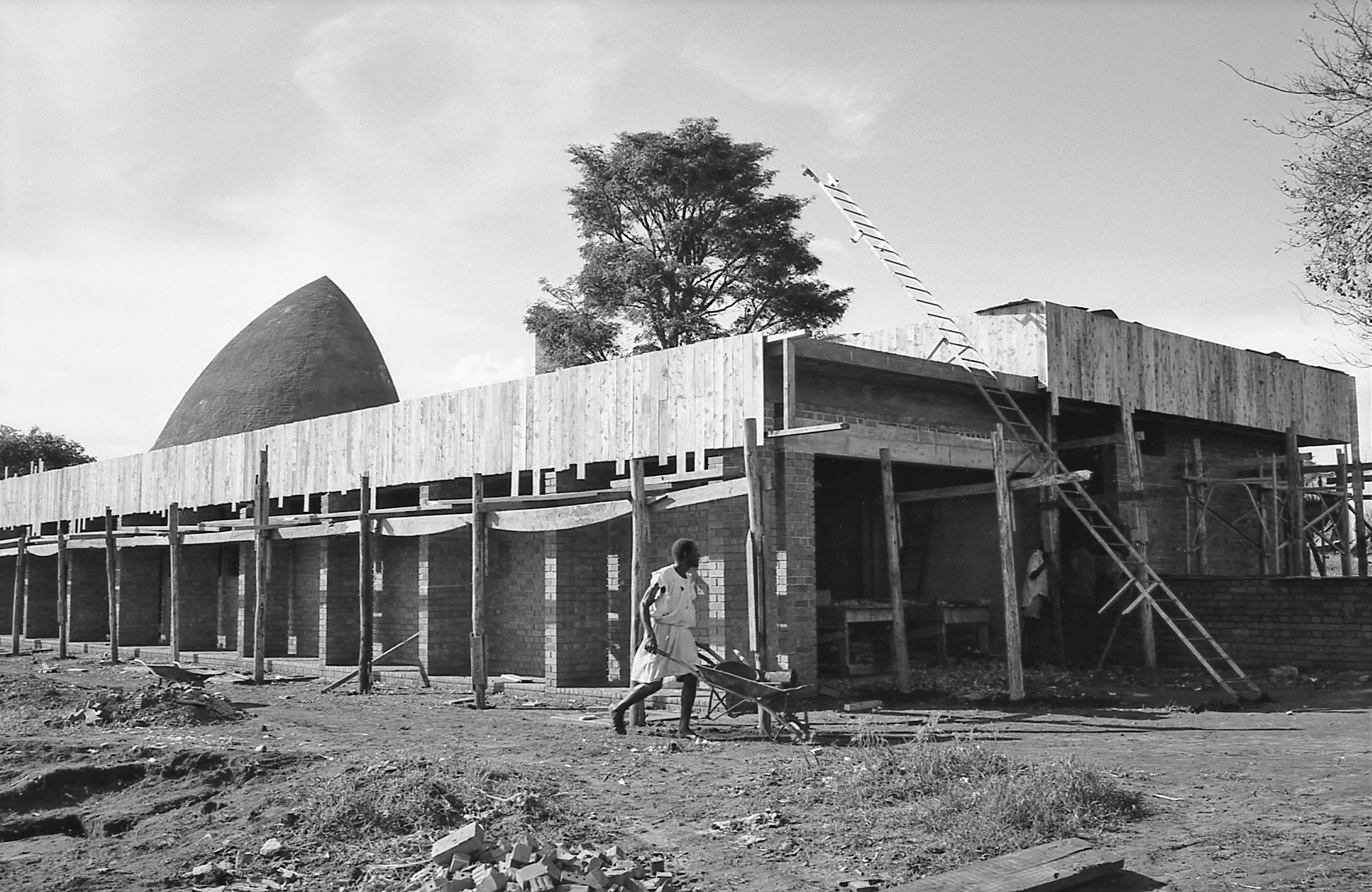

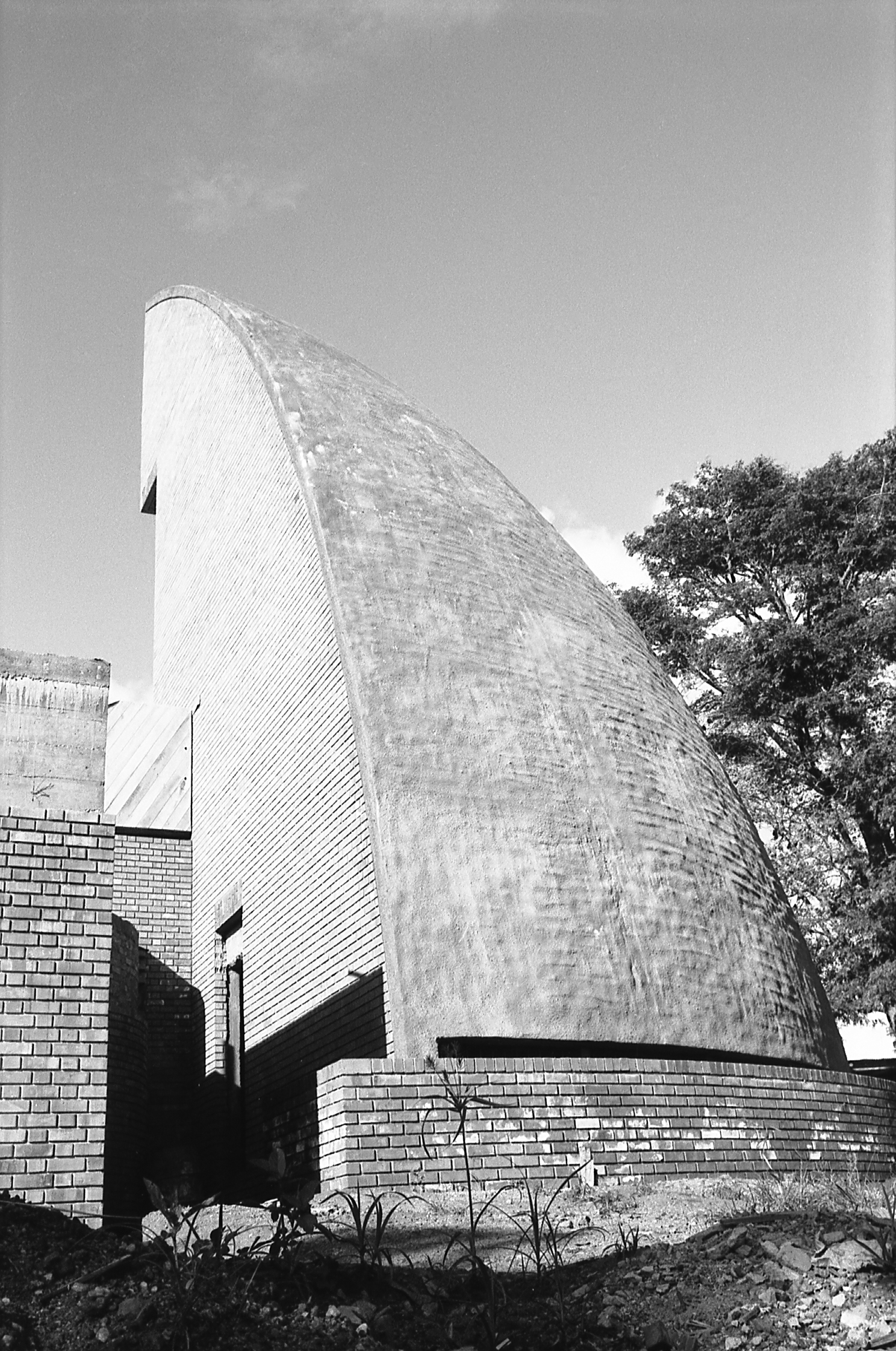

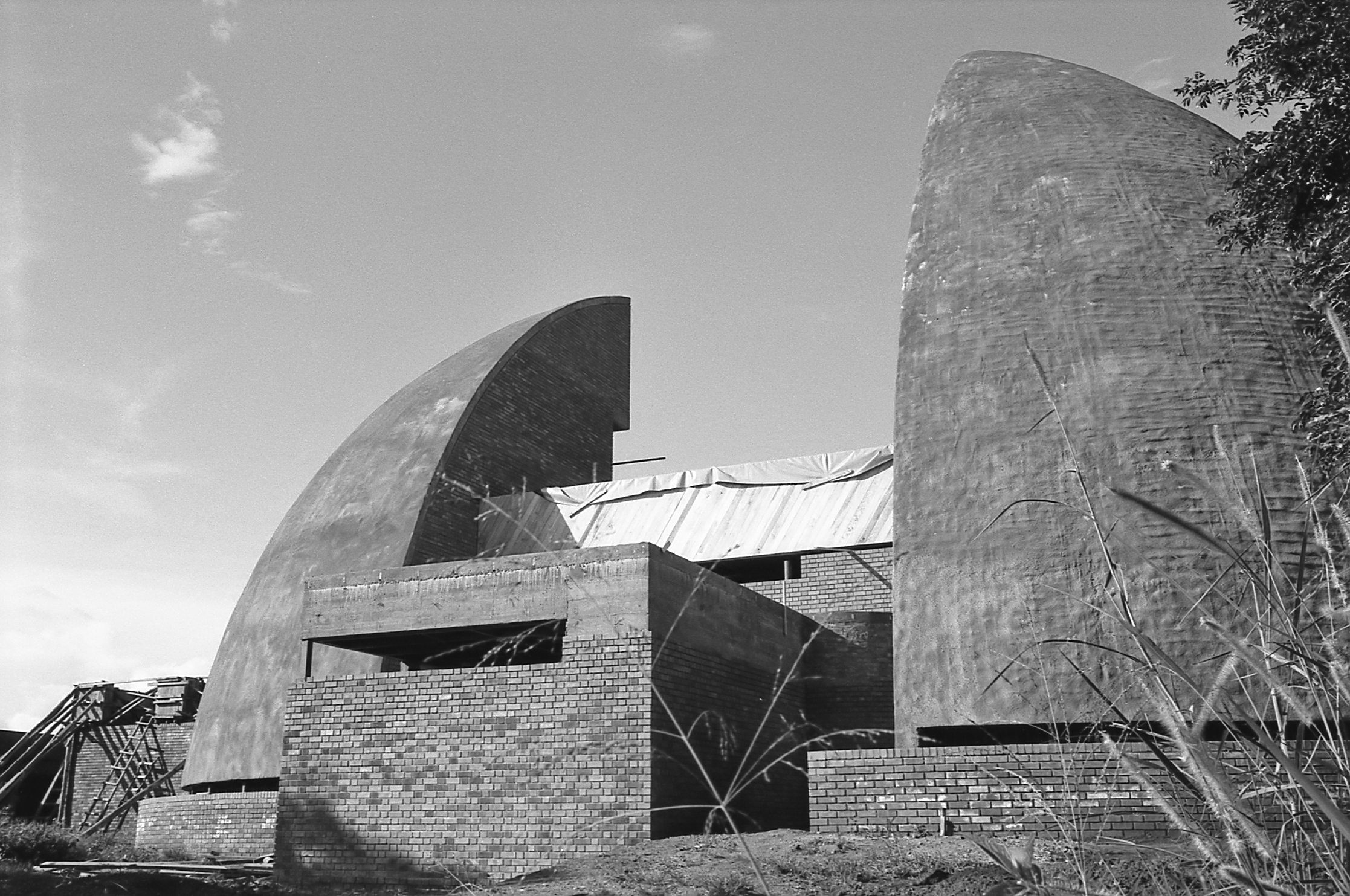

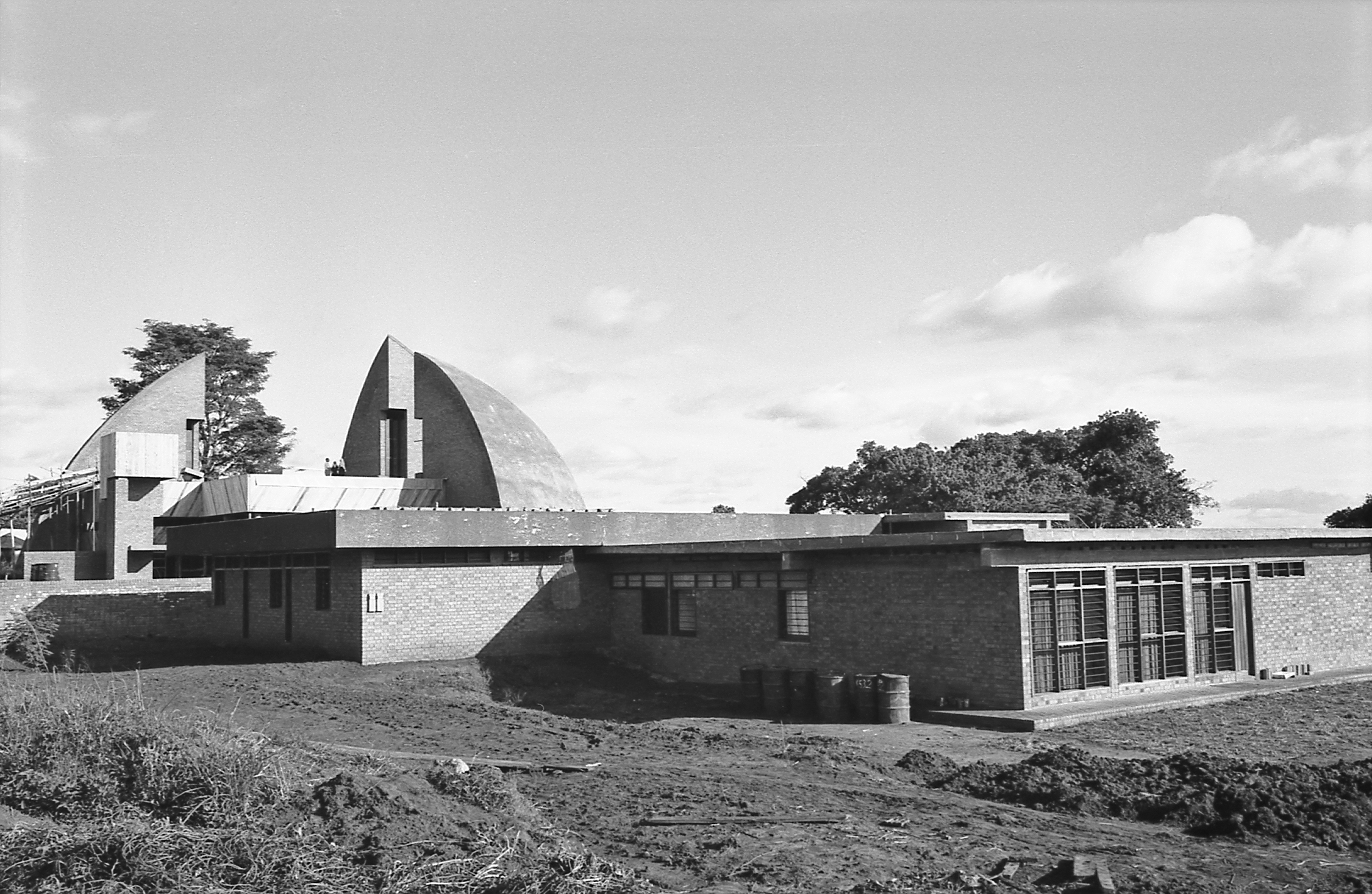

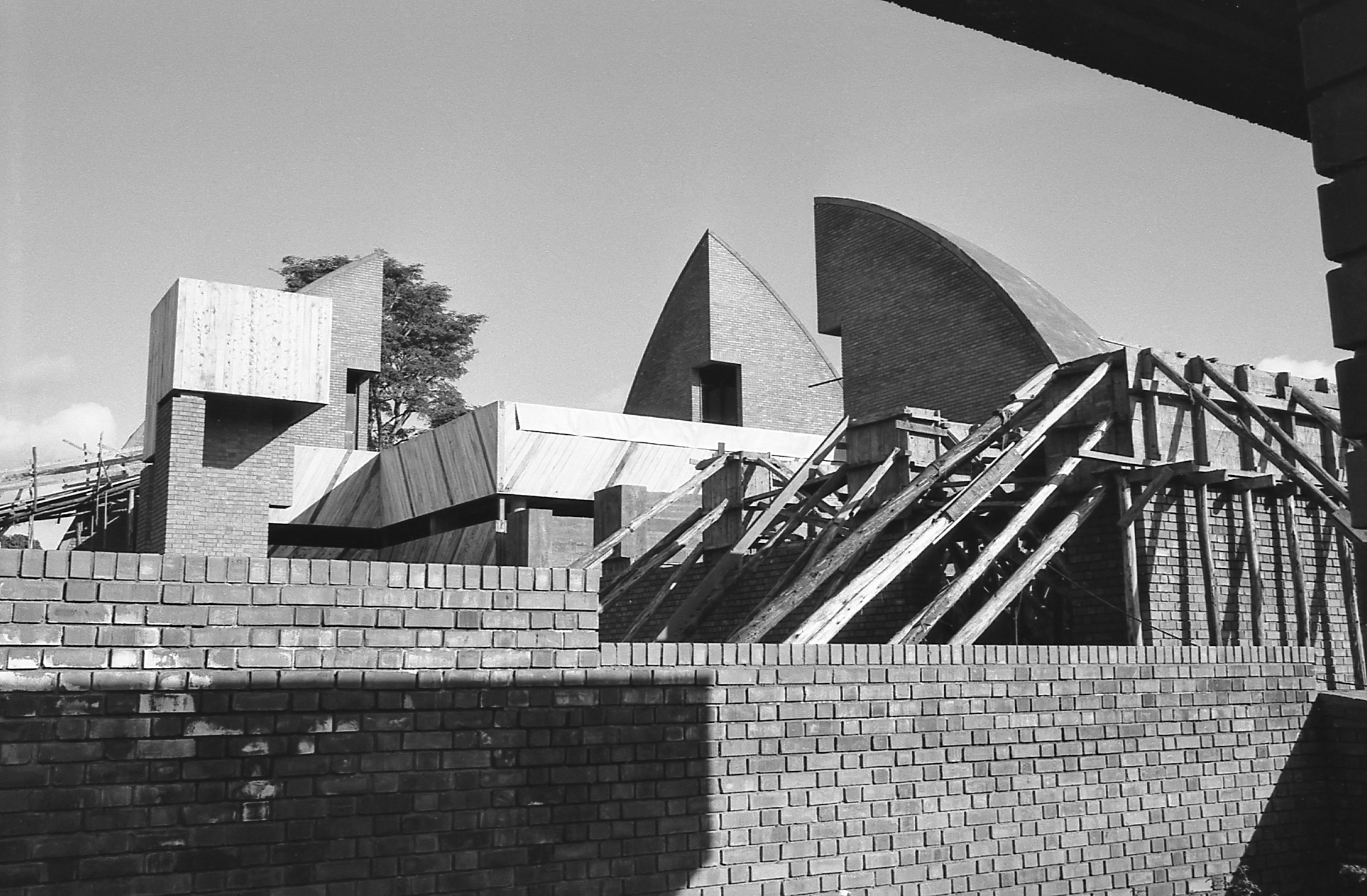

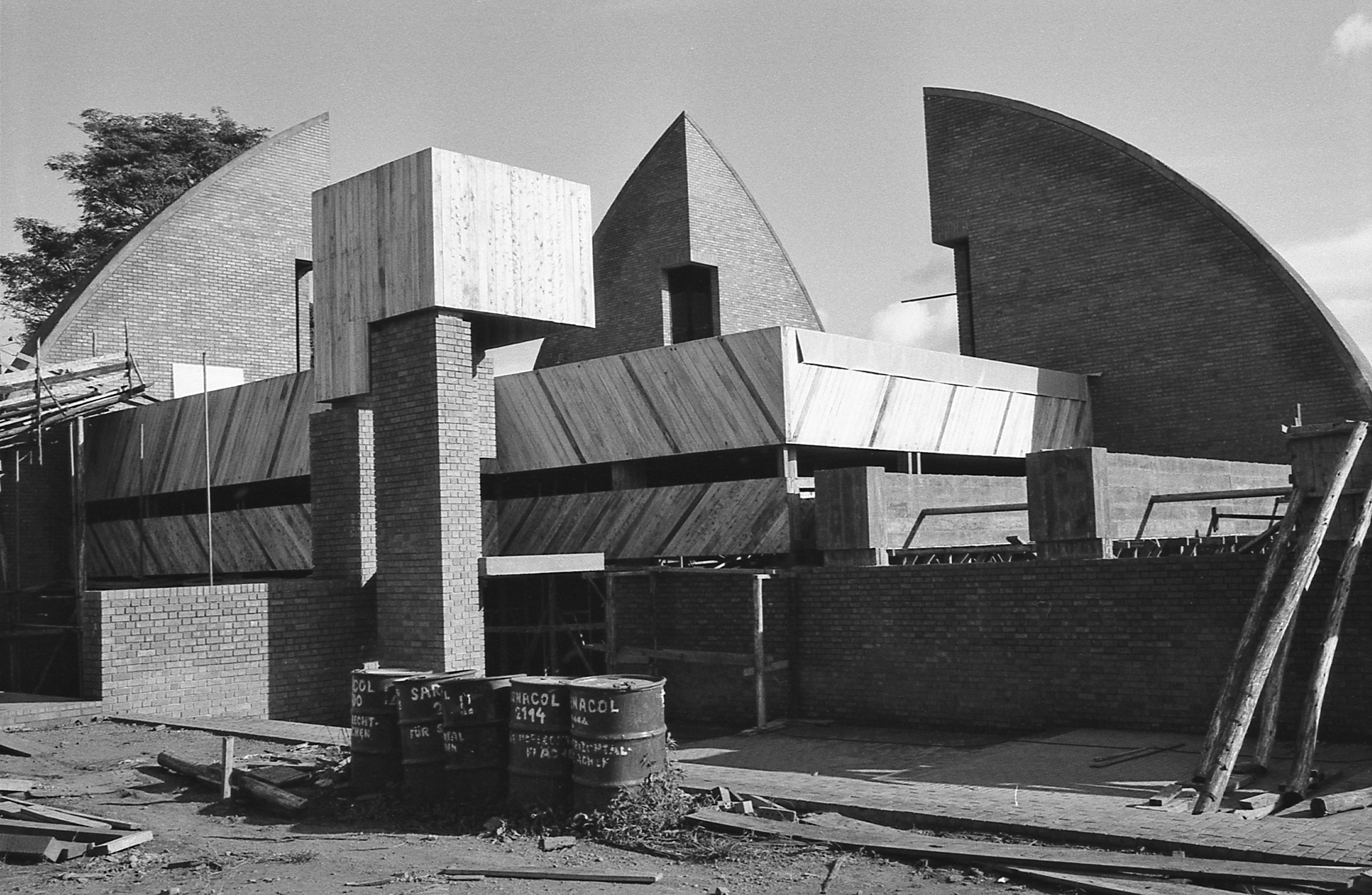

== Bishops ==
- Bishops of Kiyinda–Mityana (Roman rite)
  - Bishop Emmanuel Wamala (17 July 1981 – 21 June 1988), appointed Coadjutor Archbishop of Kampala; future Cardinal
  - Bishop Joseph Mukwaya (21 June 1988 – 23 October 2004)** Bishop Joseph Anthony Zziwa (since 23 October 2004)

=== Coadjutor Bishop ===
- Joseph Anthony Zziwa (2001-2004)

== See also ==
- Roman Catholicism in Uganda
- Mityana

== Sources ==
- catholic-hierarchy
