= Cesare Asili =

Ugandan Catholic priest

- Bishop Emeritus of Lira
- Church: Roman Catholic Church
- Archdiocese: Roman Catholic Archdiocese of Gulu
- See: Roman Catholic Diocese of Lira
- Appointed: 12 July 1968
- Term ended: 12 October 1988
- Predecessor: None
- Successor: Joseph Oyanga

Orders
- Ordination: 15 May 1963
- Consecration: 27 October 1968 by Laurean Rugambwa
- Rank: Bishop

Personal details
- Born: Cesare Asili; 20 September 1924 Moyo, Uganda
- Died: 12 October 1988 (aged 64)

Cesare Asili (20 September 1924 – 12 October 1988) was a Ugandan Catholic priest who served as Bishop of the Roman Catholic Diocese of Lira. He was appointed bishop of Lira on 12 July 1968 and he died as such on 12 October 1988.

== Background and priesthood ==
Asili was born on 20 September 1924, in Moyo, Moyo District, West Nile sub-region, in the Northern Region of Uganda. He was ordained a priest on 5 June 1955.

== As bishop ==
Asili was appointed Bishop of Lira on 12 July 1968 and was consecrated a bishop at Lira on 27 October 1968 by Cardinal Laurean Rugambwa, Bishop of Bukoba, assisted by Archbishop Emmanuel Kiwanuka Nsubuga, Archbishop of Archdiocese of Kampala and Archbishop Amelio Poggi, Titular Archbishop of Cercina. Asili died as Bishop of Lira, on 12 October 1988, at the age of 64 years.

Catholic Church titles
Preceded by None	Bishop of Lira; 1968 - 1988	Succeeded by Joseph Oyanga (1989 - 2003)
