= Albert Edward Baharagate Akiiki =

Ugandan Catholic priest (1930–2023)

His Excellency Albert Edward Baharagate Akiiki
- Bishop Emeritus of Hoima
- Church: Roman Catholic Church
- Archdiocese: Roman Catholic Archdiocese of Mbarara
- See: Roman Catholic Diocese of Hoima
- Appointed: 7 July 1969
- Term ended: 9 March 1991
- Predecessor: Cipriano Biyehima Kihangire
- Successor: Deogratias Muganwa Byabazaire

Orders
- Ordination: 7 December 1958
- Consecration: 1 August 1969 by Pope Paul VI
- Rank: Bishop

Personal details
- Born: Albert Edward Baharagate Akiiki; 25 February 1930 Nyamigisa village, Masindi District, Protectorate of Uganda
- Died: 5 April 2023 (aged 93) Kampala, Uganda

Albert Edward Baharagate Akiiki (25 February 1930 – 5 April 2023) was a Ugandan Roman Catholic priest who served as Bishop of the Roman Catholic Diocese of Hoima. He was appointed bishop of Hoima on 7 July 1969 and he resigned on 9 March 1991.

== Background and priesthood ==
Baharagate was born on 25 February 1930, in Nyamigisa village, in present-day Masindi District, in Bunyoro sub-region, in the Western Region of Uganda. He was ordained a priest on 7 December 1958.

== As bishop ==
He was appointed Bishop of Hoima on 7 July 1969 and was consecrated a bishop at Hoima on 1 August 1969 by Pope Paul VI, assisted by Archbishop Sergio Pignedoli, Titular Archbishop of Iconium and Archbishop Emmanuel Kiwanuka Nsubuga, Archbishop of Archdiocese of Kampala.

At the time of his entronement as Bishop, Baharagate had just returned from Rome ready to be deployed as a parish priest.

On 9 March 1991, Baharagate resigned as Bishop of Hoima and was replaced by Deogratius Muganwa Byabazaire after serving the diocese for 22 years. Baharagate at the age of 61, 14 years hitting the mandatory retirement age recommended Canon Law which is 75 years.

In his later life, he lived as Bishop Emeritus of Hoima.

== Death ==
Baharagate Akiiki died at Nsambya hospital in Kampala, on 5 April 2023, at the age of 93. He was buried at Bujumbura episcopal mausoleum on Thursday, April 13, 2023.

Catholic Church titles
Preceded by Cipriano Biyehima Kihangire	Bishop of Hoima; 1969–1991	Succeeded by Deogratias Muganwa Byabazaire
