= Political authorities =

Political authorities hold positions of power or influence within a system of government, exercising a right to make and enforce binding rules over a populace. Although some are exclusive to one or another form of government, many exist within several types.

== See also ==
- Cabinet (government)
  - Minister
  - Secretary
  - Secretary of state
  - Attorney general
- Campaign contributors
- Head of state
  - President
  - Monarch
    - Emperor
- Head of government
  - Prime minister
- Legislatures
- Military
- Unions
- Political parties
  - One-party system
  - Dominant-party system
  - Multi-party system
- Voters / populace
