= Egidio Nkaijanabwo =

Ugandan priest

- Bishop of Kasese
- Church: Roman Catholic Church
- Archdiocese: Roman Catholic Archdiocese of Mbarara
- See: Roman Catholic Archdiocese of Kasese
- Appointed: 6 March 1989
- Term ended: 15 April 2014
- Predecessor: None
- Successor: Francis Aquirinus Kibira

Orders
- Ordination: 28 May 1961
- Consecration: 17 June 1989 by Emmanuel Kiwanuka Nsubuga
- Rank: Bishop

Personal details
- Born: Egidio Nkaijanabwo; 29 August 1935 (age 90) Rugazi Village, Rubirizi District, Uganda

Egidio Nkaijanabwo (born 29 August 1935), is a Ugandan Roman Catholic priest who served as Bishop of the Roman Catholic Diocese of Kasese, from 6 March 1989 until 15 April 2014.

== Background and priesthood ==
Nkaijanabwo was born on 29 August 1935 in Rugazi, in present-day Rubirizi District, in the Western Region of Uganda. He was ordained a priest on 28 May 1961, at Liverpool Metropolitan Cathedral, in Liverpool, United Kingdom. He served as priest until 6 March 1989.

== As bishop ==
He was appointed Bishop of Roman Catholic Diocese of Kasese on 6 March 1989 and was consecrated a Bishop at Kasese on 17 June 1989 by Cardinal Emmanuel Kiwanuka Nsubuga, Archbishop of the Roman Catholic Archdiocese of Kampala, assisted by Bishop Serapio Bwemi Magambo†, Bishop of Fort Portal and Bishop John Baptist Kakubi†, Bishop of Mbarara.

On 15 April 2014, Bishop Nkaijanabwo retired as bishop and lives on as Bishop Emeritus of Kasese, Uganda.

== Succession table at Tororo ==
Preceded by None (Before 1989)	Bishop of Kasese; 1989 - 2014	Succeeded by Francis Aquirinus Kibira (Since 2014)

== See also ==
- Gaetano Batanyenda
- Catholic Church in Uganda
- Christianity in Uganda
- Religion in Uganda
