= Diocese of Kasese =

Diocese of the Catholic Church in Uganda

Coordinates: 0.1764°N 30.0722°E

Diocese of Kasese Dioecesis Kasesensis
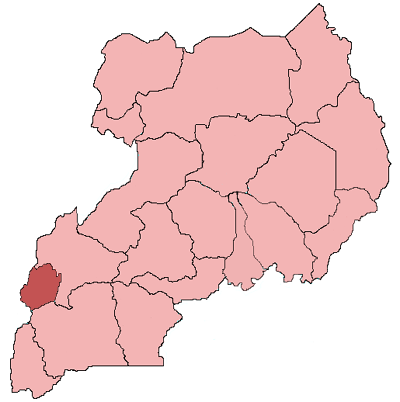
- Roman Catholic Diocese of Kasese

Location
- Country: Uganda
- Metropolitan: Mbarara

Statistics
- Area: 3,205 km^{2} (1,237 sq mi)
- Population: Total; Catholics: (as of 2004); 466,995; 201,248 (43.1%)

Information
- Rite: Latin Rite

Current leadership
- Pope: Leo XIV
- Bishop: Francis Aquirinus Kibira
- Bishops emeritus: Egidio Nkaijanabwo

The Roman Catholic Diocese of Kasese (Latin: Kasesen(sis)) is a suffragan diocese of the Roman Catholic Archdiocese of Mbarara in Uganda.

== History ==
- 6 March 1989: Established as the Diocese of Kasese separate from the Diocese of Fort Portal

== Bishops of Kasese ==
- Egidio Nkaijanabwo (6 March 1989 – 15 April 2014)
- Acquirino Francis Kibira Araali (since 12 July 2014)

== See also ==
- Roman Catholicism in Uganda
