= Diocese of Hoima =

Diocese of the Catholic Church in Uganda

Coordinates: 1.4376°N 31.3336°E

Diocese of Hoima Dioecesis Hoimanus
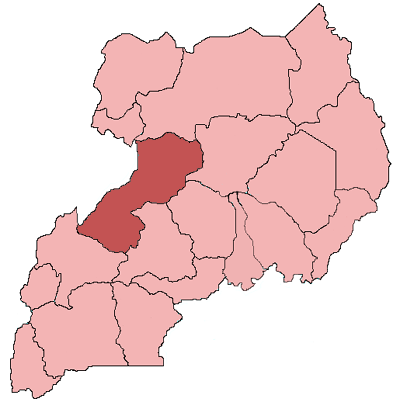
- Roman Catholic Diocese of Hoima

Location
- Country: Uganda
- Metropolitan: Mbarara

Statistics
- Area: 17,200 km^{2} (6,600 sq mi)
- Population: 1,075,812

Information
- Rite: Latin Rite
- Cathedral: Our Lady of Lourdes Cathedral

Current leadership
- Pope: Leo XIV
- Bishop: Vincent Kirabo

The Roman Catholic Diocese of Hoima (Latin: Hoiman(us)) is a diocese located in the city of Hoima in the ecclesiastical province of Mbarara in Uganda.

The Diocese of Hoima, whose evangelization was spearheaded by the Missionaries of Africa (White Fathers), was erected on 9 August 1965, being made up of areas cut from the then Fort Portal Diocese and Lubaga Archdiocese. It started with 7 Parishes, there are now 36. The first bishop was Cipriano Biyehima Kihangire, who later became the first African Bishop of Gulu and died on 1 November 1990. Albert Edward Baharagate succeeded him on 5 October 1969. He retired on 9 March 1991. Deogratias Muganwa Byabazaire succeeded Baharagate on 9 Mar 1991, serving as bishop until his death on 8 February 2014. On 30 November 2015, Vincent Kirabo was appointed Bishop of Hoima, to succeed the late Byabazaire.

Hoima Diocese comprises one city and eight districts of Bunyoro: Hoima district, Masindi, Kibaale, Buliisa, Kagadi, Kakumiro, Kikuube and Kiryandongo. It is a suffragan of Ecclesiastical Province of Mbarara Archdiocese. About 25% of the entire population are settlers and refugees from the Democratic Republic of Congo, Rwanda, the Sudan, and other national ethnic groups. Its Patron Saints are: St. Joseph Protector of the Church and St. Andrea Kaahwa.

Cipriano Biyehima Kihangire

He was the first Bishop of Hoima, appointed as such in 1965. He was ordained priest on 17 February 1951, appointed Auxiliary Bishop of Gulu (and Titular Bishop of Maura) on 12 November 1962 (consecrated 24 March 1963), and appointed Bishop of Uganda, Military on 20 January 1964. He was concurrently appointed Bishop of Hoima on 9 August 1965. (He left Hoima due to being appointed Bishop of Gulu on 19 December 1968. He resigned as Bishop of Uganda, Military on 5 January 1985, resigned as Bishop of Gulu on 9 January 1988, and died on 1 November 1990.)

Albert Edward Baharagate Akiiki

Bishop Emeritus of Hoima. Born at Nyamigisa, Masindi, on 25 February 1930, was ordained priest at Nyamigisa Parish, Masindi, on 7 December 1958. Ordained bishop on 1 August 1969. Installed bishop of Hoima on 5 October 1969 and retired on 9 March 1991.

Deogratias Muganwa Byabazaire

He was born at Karujubu, Masindi District, on 9 October 1941. Ordained Priest at Bujumbura, Hoima, on 9 August 1969, Deogratias Byabazaire died 8 February 2014 morning at Entebbe Airport on his way back to Uganda. Ordained bishop (coadjutor) on 18 August 1990 and installed Bishop of Hoima on 9 March 1991.

Lambert Bainomugisha

He was born 12 July 1961 at Kashumba, Bukanga. He was ordained a priest on 13 July 1991 at Mbarara Diocese. On 2 July 2005 he was appointed auxiliary bishop, Archdiocese of Mbarara, and also appointed Titular Bishop of Tacia, Montana. On 1 October 2005, he was ordained Titular Bishop of Tacia Montana. On 13 November 2009 Pope Benedict XVI appointed him apostolic administrator "sede plena et ad nutum Sanctae Sedis" of Hoima Diocese. He ended his mission when Bishop Vincent Kirabo was ordained and installed as bishop.

Vincent Kirabo

He is the current bishop, having been appointed on 30 November 2015 and ordained on 28 February 2016. He was ordained Priest in 1979. He was educated in Gulu, Ggaba, Rome and Portland, Oregon. At the time of his appointment, he was Professor of Theology at Ggaba National Seminary in Kampala, Uganda.

== See also ==
- Hoima
- Our Lady Queen of Poland Catholic Church
- Roman Catholicism in Uganda
