= Ggaba National Major Seminary =

Ugandan Catholic institution

Saint Mary's National Major Seminary Ggaba
- Type: Private, Seminary
- Established: 1970; 56 years ago
- Founders: Cardinal Emmanuel Kiwanuka Nsubuga
- Accreditation: Uganda Episcopal Conference; Uganda National Council for Higher Education
- Affiliations: Catholic Church in Uganda
- Religious affiliation: Catholic
- Academic affiliations: Makerere University; Pontifical Urban University
- Rector: Father Lazarus Luyinda (2022)
- Location: Ggaba, Makindye Division, Kampala, Uganda; 00°15′43″N 32°37′45″E
- Website: library.gns.ac.ug
- Location in Uganda

Ggaba National Major Seminary, (also Saint Mary's National Major Seminary Ggaba) is a National Seminary of the Catholic Church in Uganda. The institution is a training facility and House of Formation under the auspices of the Uganda Episcopal Conference (UEC). The institution is also accredited by the Uganda National Council for Higher Education to teach some non-religious academic courses. The seminary is affiliated with both the Pontifical Urban University in Rome, Italy and with Makerere University in Kampala, Uganda.

== Location ==
The seminary is located in Ggaba, in Makindye Division, in the south of the city of Kampala. This is approximately 10 kilometres (6 mi) southeast of the central business district of Kampala.

== History ==
St. Mary's National Major Seminary was opened at the present location at Ggaba in 1970. In 1970, all four classes of Katingondo's theology students were transferred St. Mary's National Seminary. Since then, "more than 2,754 seminarians have been enrolled, of whom more than 1,990 have been ordained priests and more than 19 of them have been raised to bishops and archbishops".

== Academics ==
The seminary is primarily a school of theology, which instructs seminarians in Theology before they are ordained priests. The seminary awards the Diploma in Theology on its own letterhead. It also awards a Bachelor of Theology degree in corroboration with the Pontifical Urban University in Rome. It also awards a Master's degree in Theology and Religious Studies in conjunction with Makerere University.

== Overview ==
As of March 2025, this seminary is one of four national major Catholic seminaries in Uganda.

- St. Thomas Aquinas Katigondo Major Seminary: Teaching Philosophy.
- Uganda Martyr's National Major Seminary Alokolum, Archdiocese of Gulu: Teaching Philosophy.
- Saint Paul's National Major Seminary Kinyamasika, Diocese of Fort Portal: Teaching Theology.
- Saint Mary's National Major Seminary Ggaba, Archdiocese of Kampala: Teaching Theology.

== Rectors ==
As of November 2022, the Rector of the seminary was the Reverend Father Lazarus Luyinda.
