= John Baptist Odama =

Ugandan Catholic prelate (born 1947)

The Most Reverend John Baptist Odama
- Archbishop Emeritus of Gulu, Uganda
- Church: Roman Catholic Church
- Archdiocese: Roman Catholic Archdiocese of Gulu
- See: Gulu
- Appointed: 2 January 1999
- Installed: 2 January 1999
- Term ended: 22 March 2024
- Predecessor: Martin Luluga
- Successor: Raphael p'Mony Wokorach, M.C.C.J.
- Other posts: 1. Bishop of Nebbi (23 February 1996 - 2 January 1999); 2. Apostolic Administrator of Gulu (22 March 2024 - 12 July 2024)

Orders
- Ordination: 14 December 1974 by Angelo Tarantino
- Consecration: 26 May 1996 by Emmanuel Wamala
- Rank: Bishop

Personal details
- Born: 29 June 1947 (age 78) Riki-Oluko, Arua District, Uganda

John Baptist Odama (born 20 July 1947) is a Ugandan Roman Catholic prelate who served as the archbishop of the Roman Catholic Archdiocese of Gulu, in Uganda, from 2 January 1999 until his age-related retirement on 22 March 2024. Before that, from 23 February 1996 and 2 January 1999, he was bishop of the Roman Catholic Diocese of Nebbi, in Uganda. He was appointed bishop by Pope John Paul II. He was consecrated and installed at Nebbi on 26 May 1996. On 2 January 1999, the Holy Father transferred him to Gulu and appointed him the Metropolitan Archbishop there. His age-related resignation was accepted by Pope Francis on 22 March 2024. While in retirement, he served as Apostolic Administrator of the archdiocese of Gulu from 22 March 2024 until 12 July 2024.

== Background and priesthood ==
Odama was born in Riki-Oluko Village, in present-day Arua District, in the West Nile sub-region, in the Northern Region of Uganda on 29 June 1947. He was ordained a priest for the diocese of Arua, on 14 December 1974, at Arua Cathedral, by Bishop Angelo Tarantino, Bishop of Arua. He served as priest of Arua Diocese until 23 February 1996.

== As bishop ==
On 23 February 1996, Pope John Paul II appointed Odama bishop. He was consecrated Bishop of the Roman Catholic Diocese of Nebbi, on 26 May 1996, serving in that capacity until 2 January 1999.

On 2 January 1999, he was appointed Archbishop of the Roman Catholic Archdiocese of Gulu, being the first Catholic prelate to serve in that role; the Archdiocese having been created that same day.

Odama was the chairman of the interfaith organisation known as Acholi Religious Leaders Peace Initiative (ARLPI), from 2002 until 2010. The organisation was involved in peace-building efforts in Northern Uganda. As leader of the organisation, Odama met with Joseph Kony and other leaders of the Lord’s Resistance Army and mediated between them and the Government of Uganda. ARLPI received the Niwano Peace Prize in 2004. Odama was also involved in the 2006–08 Juba talks between the two parties in South Sudan.

Archbishop Odama has been the chairman of the Uganda Episcopal Conference since 2010.

Odama retired in March 2024 and was replaced by Raphael p’Mony Wokorach from Nebbi Catholic Diocese.

== Other responsibilities ==
As of January 2020, Archbishop Odama is the Chancellor of Uganda Martyrs University, a private university affiliated with the Roman Catholic Church in Uganda and whose main campus is in Mpigi District, Uganda.

Odama is also considered an adviser on matters of politics and national guidance for many politicians in Uganda.

== See also ==
- Roman Catholicism in Uganda
- Uganda Martyrs
- John Baptist Kakubi
- Augustine Kasujja

Catholic Church titles
Preceded by Martin Luluga (8 February 1990 - 2 January 1999)	Archbishop of Gulu (2 January 1999 - 22 March 2024)	Succeeded by Raphael p'Mony Wokorach (since 22 March 2024)
Preceded by Diocese created	Bishop of Nebbi (23 February 1996 - 2 January 1999)	Succeeded by Martin Luluga (2 January 1999 - 8 February 2011)
