= Diocese of Arua =

Diocese of the Catholic Church in Uganda

Coordinates: 3.0136°N 30.8970°E

Diocese of Arua Dioecesis Aruaensis
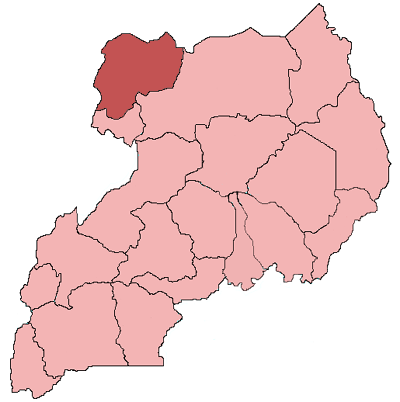
- Uganda - Diocesi di Arua

Location
- Country: Uganda
- Metropolitan: Gulu

Statistics
- Area: 10,561 km^{2} (4,078 sq mi)
- Population: Total; Catholics: (as of 2006); 1,650,275; 670,000 (40.6%)

Information
- Rite: Latin Rite
- Cathedral: Basilica of the Blessed Virgin Mary, Lodonga

Current leadership
- Pope: Leo XIV
- Bishop: Sabino Ocan Odoki

The Roman Catholic Diocese of Arua (Latin: Aruaën(sis)) is a diocese located in the city of Arua in the ecclesiastical province of Gulu in Uganda. Following the resignation of Bishop Frederick Drandua, on 19 August 2009, Pope Benedict XVI appointed the Sabino Ocan Odoki, Auxiliary Bishop of the Catholic Archdiocese of Gulu, as Apostolic Administrator of the Diocese of Arua, until a substantive bishop is appointed. On October 20, 2010 he was named ordinary Bishop.

== History ==
- June 23, 1958: Established as Diocese of Arua from Diocese of Gulu

== Bishops ==
- Bishops of Arua (Roman rite)
- Angelo Tarantinob * (1959.02.12 – 1984)
  - Frederick Drandua (1986.05.27 - 2009.08.19)
  - Sabino Ocan Odoki (2010.10.20 - present)

=== Another priest of this diocese who became bishop ===
Martin Luluga, appointed auxiliary bishop of Gulu in 1986

== Notable people ==
- Bernardo Sartori, priest and missionary

== See also ==
- Catholic Church in Uganda

== Sources ==
- Catholic Hierarchy
