= Diocese of Lira =

Diocese of the Catholic Church in Uganda

Coordinates: 2.2525°N 32.8980°E

Diocese of Lira Liren(sis), Dioecesis Lirensis
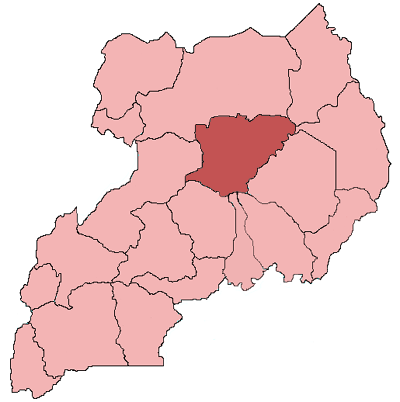
- Uganda - Diocesi di Lira

Location
- Country: Uganda
- Territory: Lira District, Apac District, Oyam District, Dokolo District, Amolatar District, Kole District, Alebtong District, Otuke District
- Ecclesiastical province: Gulu
- Metropolitan: Gulu

Statistics
- Area: 12,030 km^{2} (4,640 sq mi)
- Population: Total; Catholics: (as of 2004); 1,751,700; 980,600 (56.0%)
- Parishes: 27

Information
- Denomination: Roman Catholic
- Rite: Roman Rite
- Established: July 12, 1968
- Cathedral: Uganda Martyrs Cathedral, Lira
- Patron saint: Uganda Martyrs

Current leadership
- Pope: Leo XIV
- Bishop: Sanctus Lino Wanok
- Bishops emeritus: Giuseppe Franzelli, M.C.C.I.

Website
- liracatholicdiocese.com

The Roman Catholic Diocese of Lira (Latin: Liren(sis)) is a diocese located in the city of Lira in the ecclesiastical province of Gulu in Uganda.

== History ==
- July 12, 1968: Established as Diocese of Lira from Diocese of Gulu

== Ordinaries ==
- Cesare Asili (1968.07.12 – 1988.10.12)
- Joseph Oyanga (1989.07.04 – 2003.12.02)
- Giuseppe Franzelli, M.C.C.I. (2005.04.01 – 2018.11.23)
- Sanctus Lino Wanok (2018.11.23 -)

== See also ==
- Roman Catholicism in Uganda
- Lira
