= Archdiocese of Gulu =

Catholic archdiocese in Uganda

Coordinates: 2.7667°N 32.2833°E

Archdiocese of Gulu Archidioecesis Guluensis
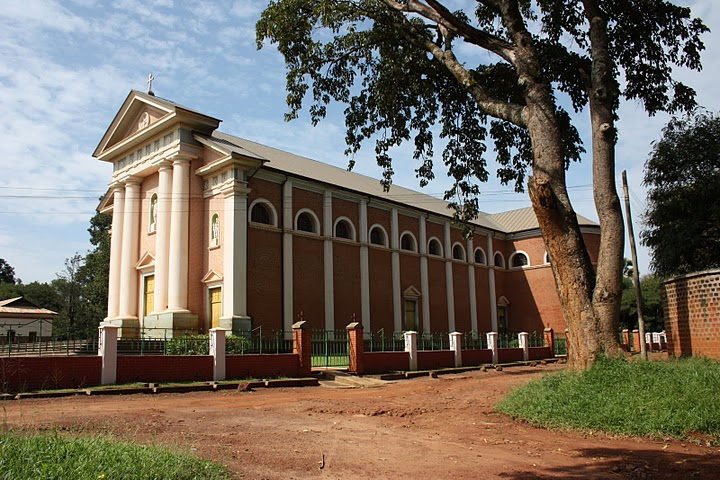
- St Joseph's Cathedral, Gulu, seen from the road to St. Jude's

Location
- Country: Uganda

Statistics
- Area: 27,945 km^{2} (10,790 sq mi)
- Population: Total; Catholics: 1,798,823; 1,034,169 (57.5%)
- Parishes: 29

Information
- Denomination: Catholicism
- Established: June 12, 1923
- Secular priests: 65
- Metropolitan Archbishop: Raphael p'Mony Wokorach, M.C.C.J. (designate); John Baptist Odama (emeritus)
- Suffragans: Arua, Lira, Nebbi

Map
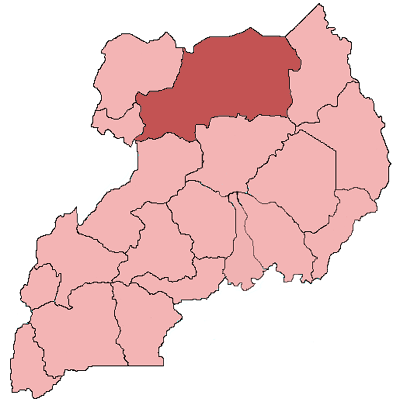
- Archidioces of Gulu

The Roman Catholic Archdiocese of Gulu (Latin: Guluen(sis)) is the Metropolitan See for the ecclesiastical province of Gulu in Uganda.

== History ==
- 1923.06.12: Established as Apostolic Prefecture of Nilo Equatoriale from the Apostolic Vicariate of Bahr el-Ghazal in Sudan
- 1934.12.10: Promoted as Apostolic Vicariate of Nilo Equatoriale
- 1950.12.01: Renamed as Apostolic Vicariate of Gulu
- 1953.03.25: Promoted as Diocese of Gulu
- 1999.01.02: Promoted as Metropolitan Archdiocese of Gulu

== Special churches ==
The seat of the archbishop is the St. Joseph's Cathedral in Gulu.

== Bishops ==
=== Ordinaries ===
- Prefect Apostolic of Nilo Equatoriale (Roman rite)
  - Fr. Antonio Vignato, M.C.C.I. (1923.07.16 – 1933)
- Vicar Apostolic of Nilo Equatoriale (Roman rite)
  - Bishop Angelo Negri, M.C.C.I. (1934.12.10 – 1949.11.13)
- Vicar Apostolic of Gulu (Roman rite)
  - Bishop Giovanni Battista Cesana, M.C.C.I. (1950.12.01 – 1953.03.25 see below)
- Bishops of Gulu (Roman rite)
  - Bishop Giovanni Battista Cesana, M.C.C.I. (see above 1953.03.25 – 1968.12.19)
  - Bishop Cipriano Biyehima Kihangire (1968.12.19 – 1990)
- Bishops of Gulu (Roman rite)
  - Bishop Martin Luluga (1990.02.08 – 1999.01.02), appointed Bishop of Nebbi
- Metropolitan Archbishops of Gulu (Roman rite)
  - Archbishop John Baptist Odama ((2 January 1999 - 22 March 2024)
  - Archbishop Raphael p'Mony Wokorach (since 22 March 2024)

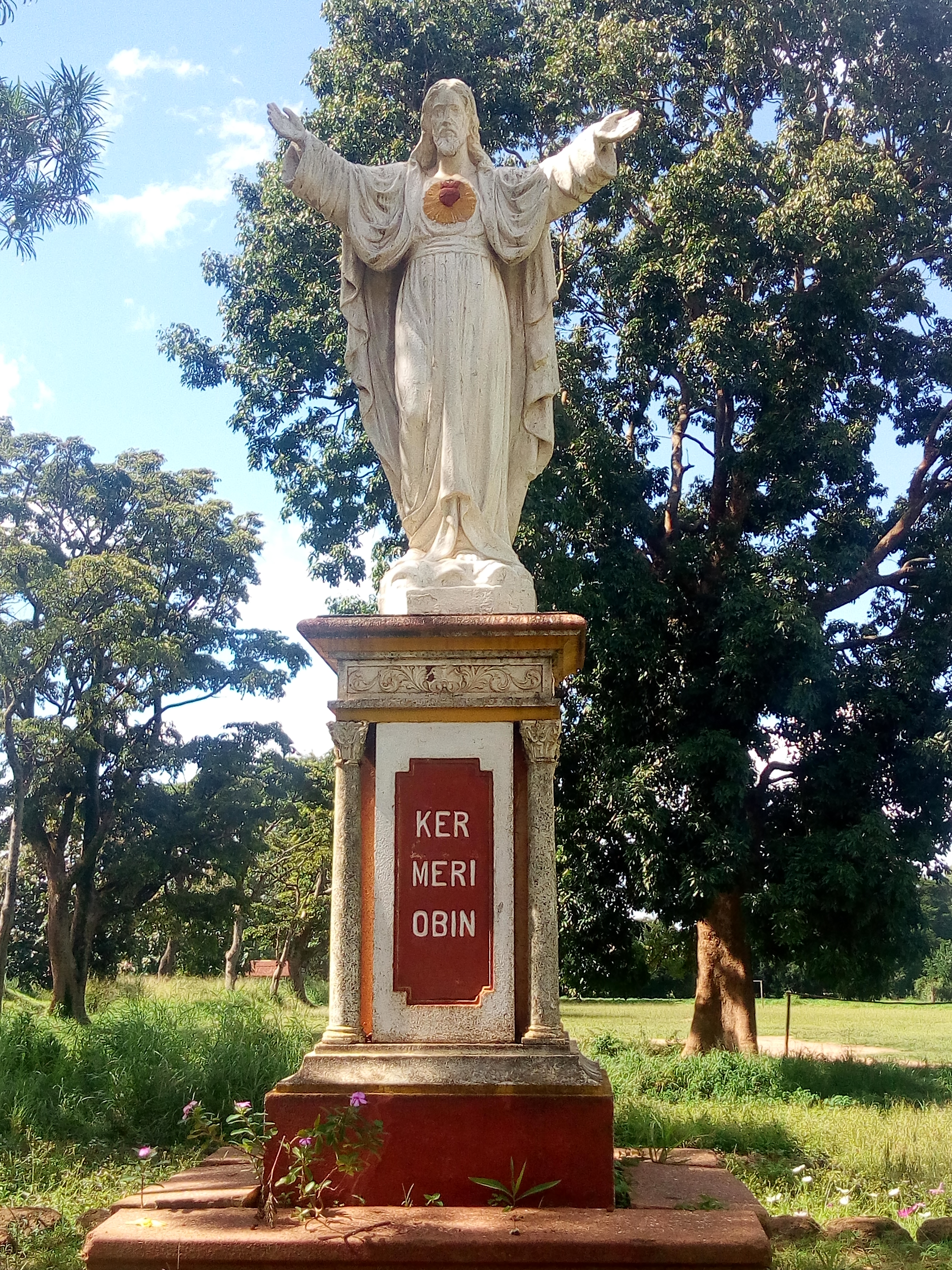
This is the sacred hearts Monument in the Roman Catholic archdiocese of Gulu.

=== Auxiliary Bishops ===
- Cipriano Biyehima Kihangire (1962-1965), appointed Bishop of Hoima; later returned here as Bishop
- Martin Luluga (1986-1990), appointed Bishop here
- Sabino Ocan Odoki (2006-2010), appointed Bishop of Arua

== Suffragan Dioceses ==
- Arua
- Lira
- Nebbi

== See also ==
- Catholic Church in Uganda
- List of Catholic dioceses in Uganda
- Gulu
- Kalongo Hospital

== Sources ==
- Catholic Hierarchy
