= Caritas Uganda =

Ugandan Catholic charity and relief organisation

- Established: 1958 (established); 1970 (operationalised)
- Founder: Uganda Episcopal Conference
- Type: Nonprofit
- Purpose: development aid, humanitarian aid, social services
- Location: Kampala, Uganda
- Coordinates: 0.30058°N 32.58847°E
- Origins: Catholic Social Teaching
- Region served: Uganda
- President: Bishop Serverus Jjumba
- Affiliations: Caritas Internationalis, Caritas Africa
- Website: caritasuganda.org

Caritas Uganda is the official social development arm of the Catholic Church in Uganda. It has been operating since 1970 and is implementing social welfare and development projects all over the country, while also acting as a humanitarian relief agency when needed. Caritas Uganda is a member of Caritas Africa and of Caritas Internationalis.

== History ==
In 1958, the Uganda Episcopal Conference decided to establish the Commission of Social Service and Development, however the organisation only became operational in 1970 with activities supporting refugees in the Nakivale Refugee Settlement who had fled Rwanda.

The Commission went through an organisational crisis and a period of renewal in the late 1990s, and in June 1999, the Bishops of Uganda renamed it to Caritas Uganda.

== Structure ==
Caritas Uganda consist of a national office and 19 diocesan offices. These 19 diocesan offices are the following:

In the Ecclesiastical Province of Kampala:
- Caritas Lugazi
- Caritas Kasana Luweero
- Caritas Masaka
- Caritas Kiyinda Mityana
- Caritas Kampala

In the Ecclesiastical Province of Mbarara:

- Caritas Kasese
- Caritas Kabale
- Caritas Hoima
- Caritas Fort Portal
- Caritas Mbarara

In the Ecclesiastical Province of Tororo:

- Caritas Soroti
- Caritas Moroto
- Caritas Kotido
- Caritas Jinja
- Caritas Tororo

In the Ecclesiastical Province of Gulu:

- Caritas Nebbi
- Caritas Lira
- Caritas Arua
- Caritas Gulu

The Central Archdiocesan Province Caritas Association (CAPCA) is a consortium of the five diocesan Caritas organisations of the Ecclesiastical Province of Kampala as well as of the Tusuubira Women's Development Agency (TWDA).

The 19 diocesan organisations in turn coordinate the work of more than 470 Caritas structures at parish level, firmly rooted in the local communities and ensuring a capillary presence all over the country.

== Work ==
Caritas Uganda provides social services for the most vulnerable members of Ugandan society and implements development projects aimed at reducing overall poverty levels. In addition, the organisation is a humanitarian relief actor supporting communities facing emergency situations. The various Caritas organisations in Uganda are active in the field of agriculture, microfinance, WASH, healthcare and preventive health including activities for persons affected by HIV/AIDS, environmental protection, and peacebuilding.

The national office is also involved in advocacy work in Uganda as well as internationally, and supports the work of the diocesan Caritas organisations with institutional capacity strengthening activities.

To implements its activities, Caritas Uganda receives funding from a series of international NGO partners, in addition to collaborating with other local partners.
