= Bukalasa National Minor Seminary =

Ugandan Catholic educational institution

Location
- Villa Maria, Kalungu District; Uganda
- Coordinates: 00°13′56″S 31°44′07″E

Information
- Type: Private Minor Seminary (middle school and high school) (Age: 13-19)
- Religious affiliation: Catholic Church
- Established: June 9, 1893; 132 years ago
- Founder: White Fathers Ordered by Pope Leo XIII

Bukalasa National Minor Seminary (also Holy Family Minor Seminary Bukalasa), is a National Minor Seminary for the Uganda Episcopal Conference under the auspices of the Roman Catholic Diocese of Masaka. The institution is a training facility and House of Formation for middle and high schoolers aspiring to become catholic priests in future. Students primarily come from Uganda but the school has trained students from Kenya, Tanzania, and other neighboring countries.

== Location ==
Bukalasa Seminary is located in Villa Maria, a suburb of the municipality of Kalungu in Kalungu District in the Greater Masaka sub-region in the southwest of the Buganda Region in Uganda. This is approximately 16.5 kilometres (10 mi), northwest of the central business district of Masaka City.

== History ==
Holy Family Seminary was established on 9 June 1893, by Bishop John Joseph Hirth, Apostolic Vicar of the Apostolic Vicariate of Southern Nyanza, on the instructions of Pope Leo XIII. "The seminary started at Villa Maria and it operated in grass-thatched huts". It was moved to Lubaga in 1894 and then to Kisubi in 1895. When the Catholic Church obtained a large piece of real estate in the 1900 Uganda Agreement, the seminary was permanently relocated to its place of foundation; at Bukalasa, Villa Maria. The work started by Bishop John Joseph Hirth, was continued by Archbishop Henri Streicher, Vicar Apostolic Emeritus of Uganda.

== Overview ==
Bukalasa National Major Seminary, established in June 1893, is the oldest Catholic seminary in sub-Saharan Africa. Some of the notable alumni include the following:

- Joseph Nakabaale Kiwánuka, Archbishop of Rubaga, Uganda (Deceased)
- Cardinal Emmanuel Kiwanuka Nsubuga, Archbishop Emeritus of Kampala, Uganda (Deceased)
- Cardinal Emmanuel Wamala, Archbishop Emeritus of Kampala, Uganda
- Adrian Kivumbi Ddungu, Bishop Emeritus of Masaka, Uganda (Deceased)
- Paul Lokiru Kalanda, Bishop Emeritus of Fort Portal, Uganda (Deceased)
- Paul Kamuza Bakyenga, Archbishop Emeritus of Mbarara, Uganda (Deceased)
- Henry Apaloryamam Ssentongo, Bishop Emeritus of Moroto, Uganda (Deceased)
- Raphael S. Ndingi Mwana a'Nzeki, Archbishop Emeritus of Nairobi, Kenya (Deceased)
- Cardinal Laurean Rugambwa, Archbishop Emeritus of Dar-es-Salaam, Tanzania (Deceased)
- Father Basilio Lumu (Deceased), one of the first two Catholics to be ordained priest in sub-Saharan Africa on 19 June 1913.
- Father Victor Mukasa Womeraka (Deceased), one of the first two Catholics to be ordained priest in sub-Saharan Africa on 19 June 1913.
