= Henry Ssentongo =

Ugandan priest (1936–2019)

Henry Apaloryamam Ssentongo
- Bishop Emeritus of Moroto
- Church: Roman Catholic Church
- Archdiocese: Roman Catholic Archdiocese of Tororo
- See: Roman Catholic Diocese of Moroto
- Appointed: 30 March 1992
- Term ended: 20 February 2014
- Predecessor: Paul Lokiru Kalanda
- Successor: Damiano Giulio Guzzetti

Orders
- Ordination: 21 December 1963
- Consecration: 18 March 1989 by Adrian Kivumbi Ddungu
- Rank: Bishop

Personal details
- Born: Henry Apaloryamam Ssentongo; 30 November 1936; Villa Maria, Kalungu District, Uganda Protectorate
- Died: 11 December 2019 (aged 83); Nsambya Hospital, Kampala, Uganda

Henry Apaloryamam Ssentongo (30 November 1936 – 11 December 2019) was a Ugandan Roman Catholic priest who served as the Bishop of the Roman Catholic Diocese of Moroto, from 30 March 1992 until 20 February 2014.

== Background and priesthood ==
Ssentongo was born on 30 November 1936 in Villa Maria, in present-day Kalungu District, in the Buganda Region of Uganda. He attended Kalungu Primary School and then Villa Maria Primary School, before joining Bukalasa Seminary. Ssentongo then joined Katigondo Major Seminary for one and half years before he was offered a scholarship to Urbana University in Rome, Italy in 1957.

On 21 December 1963, he was ordained a priest by Cardinal Grégoire-Pierre XV (François) Agagianian†, Cardinal-Priest of San Bartolomeo all’Isola. He served as priest in the Roman Catholic Diocese of Masaka until 15 December 1988.

== As bishop ==
Ssentongo was appointed Auxiliary Bishop of Masaka and Titular Bishop of Pupiana on 15 December 1988. He was consecrated a bishop on 18 March 1989, by Bishop Adrian Kivumbi Ddungu†, Bishop of Masaka assisted by Archbishop Emmanuel Wamala, Coadjutor Archbishop of Kampala and Bishop Paul Lokiru Kalanda†, Bishop of Moroto. Ssentongo served in that capacity until 30 March 1992.

On 30 March 1992 Bishop Henry Apaloryamam Ssentongo was appointed Bishop of Moroto, serving there until his retirement of 20 February 2014. He spent his retirement as Bishop Emeritus of Moroto, at Bikira Parish, in the Roman Catholic Diocese of Masaka.

== Other responsibilities ==
Bishop Ssentongo was a member of the board of trustees of Uganda Joint Medical Store, in Nsambya, Kampala, and was member of the board of directors of Pax Insurance Limited, also in Kampala.

== Illness and death ==
On the night of 11 December 2019, Bishop Emeritus Henry Apaloryamam Ssentongo died at Nsambya Hospital, where he had been admitted earlier. He was buried at Bukalasa Minor Seminary Cemetery, in Kalungu District, at 2 pm on Monday, 16 December 2019. He was 83 years old.

== Succession table ==
Catholic Church titles
Preceded by Paul Lokiru Kalanda	Bishop of Moroto; 1992–2014	Succeeded by Damiano Giulio Guzzetti
