= Villa Maria Hospital =

Private non-profit, faith-based community hospital in Uganda

- Uganda Catholic Medical Bureau

Geography
- Location: Villa Maria, Kalungu District, Central Region, Uganda
- Coordinates: 00°13′50″S 31°44′35″E

Organisation
- Care system: Private
- Type: Community

Services
- Emergency department: I
- Beds: 126

History
- Founded: 1902; 124 years ago

Links
- Website: Homepage
- Other links: Hospitals in Uganda

Villa Maria Hospital, whose complete name is St. Lawrence Hospital Villa Maria, is a hospital in the village of Villa Maria, in Kalungu District, in the Central Region of Uganda. It is a private, non-profit, community hospital, serving the village of Villa Maria and surrounding communities in Kalungu District. It is the only general hospital in the entire district.

== Location ==
Villa Maria Hospital is located approximately 17 kilometres (11 mi), by road, south of Kalungu, where the district headquarters are located. This location is approximately 14 kilometres (8.7 mi), by road, north of Masaka Regional Referral Hospital, in the city of Masaka. Villa Maria Hospital is located approximately 140 kilometres (87 mi), by road, southeast of Mubende Regional Referral Hospital, in the town of Mubende. The geographical coordinates of Villa Maria Hospital are: 0°13'50.0"S, 31°44'35.0"E (Latitude:-0.230556; Longitude:31.743056).

== Overview ==
Villa Maria Hospital is a rural, private, community, non-profit hospital. A small fee is charged for treatment, but no one is turned away for lack of funds. The hospital is owned by the Roman Catholic Diocese of Masaka. It is accredited to the Uganda Catholic Medical Bureau (UCMB) and is managed by the Daughters of Mary Sisters, the first religious congregation of indigenous African women, in sub-Saharan Africa.

== History ==
The hospital was founded in August 1902 by the missionary sisters of Our Lady of Africa, also referred to as the White Sisters, as an aid post for victims of sleeping sickness, which was endemic in the area at that time. In 1976, the hospital administration was transferred to the Daughters of Mary Sisters, who administer it today. The hospital started St. Lawrence School of Nursing & Midwifery in 1979.

== Hospital operations ==
St. Lawrence Hospital Villa Maria has a bed capacity of 126. As of December 2019, it attended to 30,000 outpatients annually, on average, accounting for approximately 20 percent of all outpatient visits in Kalungu District. That same year, the hospital averaged 6,000 inpatient admissions with a bed occupancy ratio of 58 percent. This translated into 46 percent of all inpatient admissions in the district, on an annual basis. At the same time, 1,400 maternal deliveries were carried out annually at the hospital on average, with a caesarian section rate of 45 percent. The hospital was responsible for 24 percent of all maternal deliveries in the district, at that time. Patient user-fees account for approximately 50 percent of total hospital annual income, on average.

== See also ==
- List of hospitals in Uganda
