= Dominic Eibu =

Comboni Missionary Priest and Bishop

- Bishop of Kotido
- Church: Catholic Church
- Archdiocese: Archdiocese of Tororo
- See: Diocese of Kotido
- Appointed: 25 October 2022
- Predecessor: Giuseppe Filippi

Orders
- Ordination: 15 August 2002
- Consecration: 14 January 2023 by Most Rev. Emmanuel Obbo
- Rank: Bishop

Personal details
- Born: 30 April 1970 (age 55) Lwala Parish, Roman Catholic Diocese of Soroti
- Motto: Consolamini populum meum

Dominic Eibu, (born 30 April 1970) is a Uganda Missionary Priest in the Catholic Church who was appointed the Bishop of the Diocese of Kotido on 25 October 2022.

== Background and priesthood ==
Dominic Eibu was born on 30 April 1970 in Lwala, in the Roman Catholic Diocese of Soroti, Uganda. On 16 May 1998, he took his vows as a member of the Comboni Missionaries of the Heart of Jesus (MCCI) at the Institute of Comboni Missionaries in Namugongo, Kampala. He gave his perpetual vows on 12 January 2002 and was ordained a priest on 15 August 2002. He then studied at the Pontifical Institute of Arab and Islamic Studies where he received his licentiate in June 2005.

During his priesthood, he has served as director of the Comboni Primary School in Khartoum (2005–2016); vice superior general of the Combonian Province of Khartoum (2008–2013); member and secretary of the College of Consultors (2013–2016); secretary of the Presbyteral Council (2013–2016); secretary for education (2013–2016) and since 2017, school director and deputy parish priest in Cairo.

Before his appointment as bishop of Kotido Diocese, he was the parish priest of the Sacred Heart of Jesus parish in Cairo, vice superior general of Egypt-Sudan, and member of the Education Committee of the United Nations High Commission for Refugees.

== As bishop ==
Following the resignation of Bishop Giuseppe Filippi, Father Dominic Eibu was appointed Bishop of Kotido on 25 October 2022. He was consecrated and installed on 14 January 2023. The Most Reverend Emmanuel Obbo, Archbishop of Tororo was the Principal Consecrator assisted by Bishop Giuseppe Filippi, Bishop Emeritus of Kotido, Bishop Joseph Oliach Eciru, Bishop of Soroti, Archbishop Luigi Bianco, Titular Archbishop of Falerone and Archbishop John Baptist Odama, Archbishop of Gulu.

== Succession table ==
Preceded by Giuseppe Filippi (2007–2022)	Bishop of Kotido; 2022–present	Succeeded by Incumbent

== Personal life ==
Dominic Eibu is a professed member of the Comboni Missionaries of the Heart of Jesus (M.C.C.J.). His ministry has largely focused on missionary work, interreligious dialogue, and education, particularly in Sudan and Egypt.

== See also ==
- Roman Catholic of Kotido
- Roman Catholicism in Uganda
- Comboni Missionaries of the Heart of Jesus
- Catholic church in Uganda
