= Charles Martin Wamika =

Ugandan Roman Catholic prelate (1953–2025)

The Most Reverend Charles Martin Wamika
- Bishop of Jinja
- Church: Catholic Church
- Archdiocese: Tororo
- See: Jinja
- Appointed: 2 March 2010
- Installed: 2 March 2010
- Term ended: 22 October 2025
- Predecessor: Joseph B. Willigers
- Successor: Vacant
- Other posts: Auxiliary Bishop of Tororo and Titular Bishop of Tacapae (18 October 1993 – 2 March 2010)

Orders
- Ordination: 22 September 1979
- Consecration: 19 February 1994 by James Odongo
- Rank: Bishop

Personal details
- Born: Charles Martin Wamika; 12 August 1953 Budaka District, Protectorate of Uganda
- Died: 22 October 2025 (aged 72) Kampala, Uganda
- Motto: Ut omnes unum sint ("That all may be one")

Styles of Charles Martin Wamika
- Reference style: The Most Reverend; Your Excellency
- Religious style: Bishop

Charles Martin Wamika (12 August 1953 – 22 October 2025) was a Ugandan Roman Catholic prelate, who was the Bishop of Jinja in Uganda from 2 March 2010 until his death in office on 22 October 2025. Before this, he was auxiliary bishop of the Roman Catholic Archdiocese of Tororo from 18 October 1993 until 2 March 2010. He was appointed bishop by Pope John Paul II and consecrated at Tororo on 19 February 1994. He served concurrently as titular bishop of Tacapae while auxiliary bishop. On 2 March 2010, Pope Benedict XVI transferred him to Jinja as the local ordinary to succeed Bishop Joseph B. Willigers, whose age-related retirement was accepted by the pope and took effect the same day.

== Early life and education ==
Wamika was born on 12 August 1953 in the present-day Budaka District in the eastern region of the Protectorate of Uganda. He studied at Saint Peter's Claver College, then in 1964 he transferred to Saint Pius X Minor Seminary in Nagongera. He studied philosophy at the Uganda Martyrs' National Major Seminary Alokolum in Gulu before studying theology at the Ggaba National Major Seminary in Kampala.

== Priest ==
Wamika was ordained priest on 22 September 1979 for the Roman Catholic Archdiocese of Tororo. He served in the archdiocese until 18 October 1993.

== Bishop ==
Wamika was appointed bishop on 18 October 1993, serving as auxiliary bishop of Tororo and as titular bishop of Tacapae. He was consecrated as bishop on 19 February 1994 at Tororo by James Odongo, Bishop of Tororo, assisted by Emmanuel Wamala, archbishop of the Roman Catholic Archdiocese of Kampala, and Joseph B. Willigers, Bishop of Jinja.

On 2 March 2010 he was appointed bishop of the Diocese of Jinja. He succeeded Joseph Willigers, who retired after 43 years as bishop of the Diocese of Jinja. He continued to serve in that capacity.

== Death ==
Wamika died on 22 October 2025 at the age of 72.

== See also ==
- Uganda Martyrs
- Roman Catholicism in Uganda

Catholic Church titles
Preceded by Joseph Bernard Louis Willigers	Bishop of Jinja; 2 March 2010 – 22 October 2025	Succeeded by Vacant
Preceded by Unknown	Auxiliary Bishop of Tororo; 18 October 1993 – 2 March 2010	Succeeded by Unknown
Preceded by Braulio Sáez Garcia	Titular Bishop of Tacapae; 18 October 1993 – 2 March 2010	Succeeded by Dieter Geerlings
