= Karamoja Peace and Technology University =

University project in Uganda

Karamoja Peace and Technology University Project
- Other name: KAPATU Project
- Type: Public
- Established: 29 April 2023
- Founders: Diocese of Moroto, Catholic Lawyers Society International (CLASI), Diocese of Kotido, Government of Uganda
- Religious affiliation: Catholic Church
- Chancellor: Yoweri Museveni
- Vice-Chancellor: Jessica Alupo
- Location: Losilang, Kotido District, Uganda
- Campus: 25 acres (10 ha)
- Website: kapatu.ac.ug

The Karamoja Peace and Technology University Project (abbreviated KAPATU project), also known as the Karamoja University Project or Karamoja Varsity Project, is a proposed university project in Uganda. It is to be located in Losilang, Kotido District. The project was founded by a partnership that includes the Catholic Diocese of Moroto, the Catholic Lawyers Society International (CLASI), the Catholic Diocese of Kotido, and the Government of Uganda.

== History ==
KAPATU project was founded by a partnership that includes the Catholic Diocese of Moroto, Catholic Lawyers Society International (CLASI), Catholic Diocese of Kotido and the Government of Uganda.

In 2014, the idea for the KAPATU project emerged following research by the Catholic Lawyers Society International (CLASI), which revealed a significant socio-economic and educational gap between the Karamoja sub-region and the rest of the regions in Uganda.

On 29 April 2023, the concept for founding KAPATU was actualized when Jessica Alupo, representing Yoweri Museveni, launched the KAPATU project at the Uganda Episcopal Conference headquarters, located at the St. Augustine Institute Chapel in Nsambya, Kampala.

On 29 July 2023, Jessica Alupo, representing Yoweri Museveni, launched the construction of KAPATU in Losilang Ward, Kotido Municipality, where a foundation stone was laid.

On 23 November 2025, the KAPATU project was unveiled in Karamoja with the aim of promoting innovation, technology, human development, and peace in the Karamoja sub-region. Amama Mbabazi, representing President Yoweri Museveni, served as the chief guest at the launch. The event was also attended by Members of Parliament, religious leaders, local leaders from Karamoja, development partners, and delegates from Kenya, South Sudan, and Ethiopia.

In November 2025, Mugisha Kagume, the Deputy Executive Director of the National Council for Higher Education (NCHE) Uganda, confirmed that the NCHE council had received a formal request from KAPATU for provisional accreditation to begin teaching. He confirmed that the KAPATU project had been granted interim authority in 2024 to carry out human resource mobilisation and infrastructure development.

On 16 December 2025, an inspection was conducted by the National Council for Higher Education (NCHE) to assess whether KAPATU's main campus was ready to commence academic operations, prior to the granting of a provisional license.

== Funding ==
On 16 December 2024, President Yoweri Museveni, during a cabinet meeting, directed the Ministry of Finance of Uganda to allocate UGX 180 billion for the construction of KAPATU.

In February 2026, the Parliament of Uganda approved UGX 30 billion for the Ministry of Education and Sports to establish Karamoja Peace and Technology University (KAPATU).

The approval followed the January 2026 presentation of the 2026/27 National Budget Framework paper by Achia Remegio, the Vice Chairperson of the Parliamentary Budget Committee. In his presentation, Achia stated that President Yoweri Museveni had pledged UGX 30 billion as startup funding for the construction of KAPATU in the 2025/2026 financial year. He noted that only UGX 10 billion had been disbursed to KAPATU and that the remaining UGX 20 billion had not been allocated in the 2026/2027 financial year.

== Land ==
KAPATU sits on 25 acres (0.039 sq mi) of land located in Losilang Catholic Parish, North of Kotido Municipality.

In December 2025, Catholic Diocese of Kotido donated 76 acres (0.119 sq mi) of land towards the construction of KAPATU. The donated land is situated at the King Catholic Parish, Losilang in Kotido Municipality, Kotido District and at Kanawat Health Center III, Kanawat Catholic Parish. This land will host the KAPATU's main campus as well as its Faculty of Health Sciences.

== Faculties ==
Karamoja Peace and Technology University plans to offer certificate, undergraduate to doctoral (PhD) programmes. The initial plan is to establish five faculties: Faculty of Education, Faculty of Health Sciences, Faculty of Agriculture and Environmental Sciences, Faculty of Peace and Diplomacy, Faculty of Engineering and Technology and the School of Law.

== Administration and organization ==
The KAPATU project is overseen by the KAPATU Leadership Strategic Committee, which is chaired by the founding Chancellor, Yoweri Museveni.

=== The KAPATU Task Force ===
The committee is responsible for the operationalization of Karamoja Peace and Technology University (KAPATU) as a public university in Uganda. It consists of a Strategic Leadership Committee and a Technical Committee.

=== Governance ===
The University Council is chaired by Severino Twinobusingye. It comprises the Strategic Leadership, Ex-Officio Members, Administrative and Academic Staff, Infrastructure Committees, and Technical Consultants. It has various committees.

Other governing bodies are as follows:

- Senate and its committees
1. Directorates / Planning / Administrative Units
2. Faculties / Schools

==== University Council Committees ====
Committees of the University Council are as follows:

- Appointments, Administrative and Staff Welfare Committee.
- Quality Assurance Committee.
- Finance, Planning, and Procurement Committee.
- Audit and Risk Management Committee.
- Marketing, Student Recruitment, and Public Relations Committee.
- Students Affairs Committee.
- 300-Year (2014 -2314) Infrastructure Masterplan Committee

=== Administrative structure ===
The university has the following administrative units:

- Top management, The university senate
- The vice chancellor and deputy vice chancellor’s offices
- The boards of faculties, schools, institutes, departments
- The directorates
- The quality assurance office
- The students’ guild council
- The internal audit office
- The university library committee
- The office of the academic registrar

== Leadership ==
In 2023, Yoweri Museveni was appointed as the founding University Chancellor of Karamoja Peace and Technology University by The Catholic Lawyers Society International (CLASI). Museveni accepted the appointed and contributed UGX 60 million toward the activities of The Catholic Lawyers Society International.

Jessica Alupo was appointed as the founding Deputy Chancellor for KAPATU by the Catholic Lawyers Society International (CLASI), a position she accepted.

Amama Mbabazi serves the Chief International Fundraiser for KAPATU.

Dominic Eibu, MCCJ is the President of KAPATU and he also serves as the Bishop of Catholic Diocese of Kotido.

Severino Twinobusingye is the Chairperson University Council.

Annette Kezaabu is the Deputy Vice Chancellor Academic Affairs.

== Academics ==
KAPATU will offer programmes in the fields of computer science and applied technology, health sciences, business, oil and gas, environment, agriculture and veterinary medicine, metals industry and education, entrepreneurship and law, and peace and security studies. The courses will range from certificate to doctoral (PhD) levels.

The university will admit both Ugandan and international students from other countries, including Kenya, Ethiopia, Rwanda, Burundi, Tanzania, South Sudan, the Democratic Republic of the Congo, and Somalia.

== See also ==
- Makerere University
- Kyambogo University
- Gulu University
