= Poland–Uganda relations =

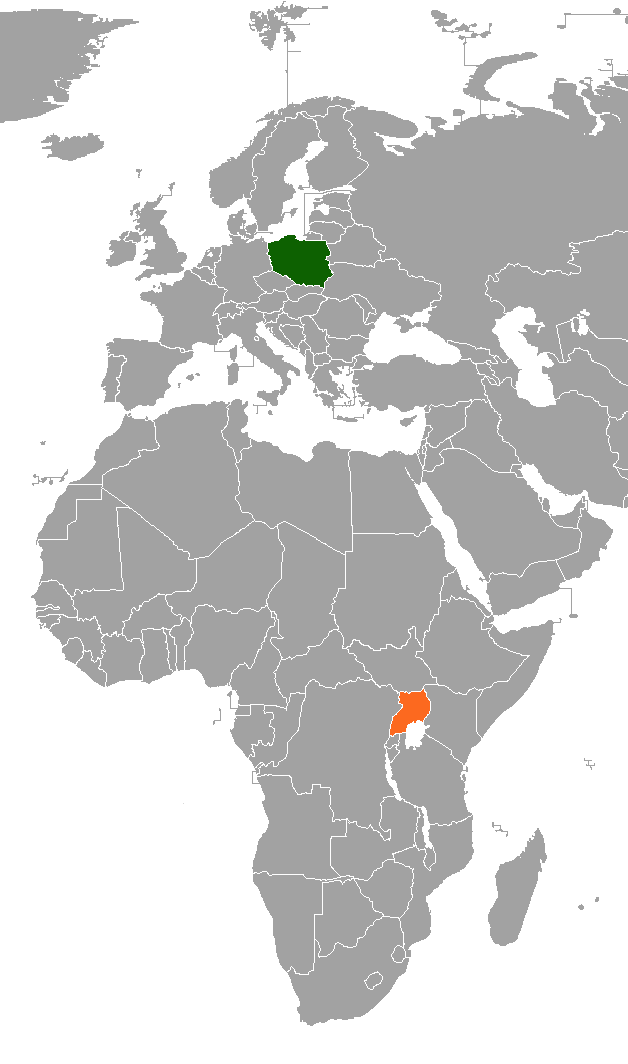
- Poland: Uganda

Poland–Uganda relations are bilateral relations between Poland and Uganda. Relations focus on trade and development assistance. Both nations are full members of the World Trade Organization and the United Nations.

== History ==
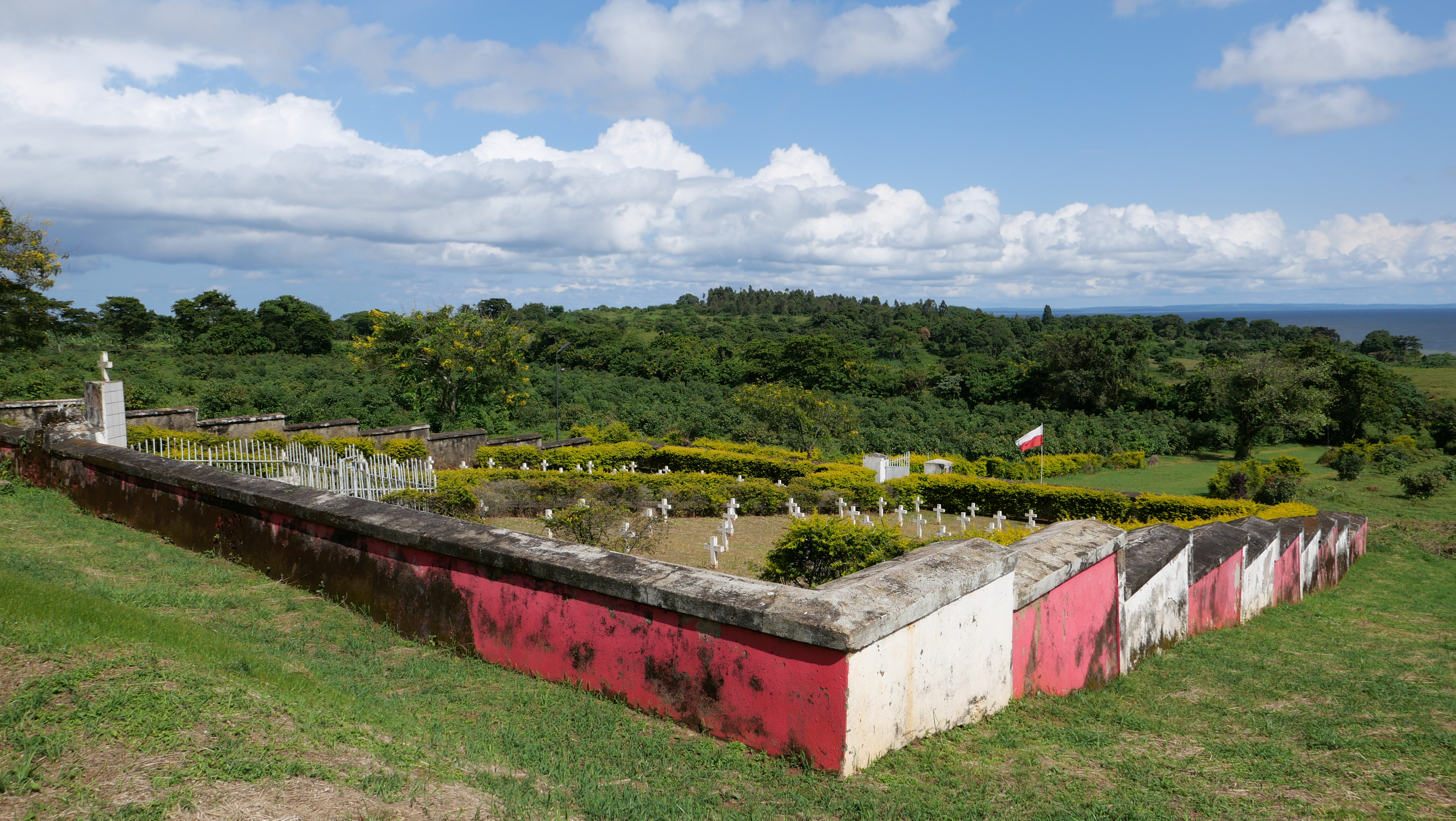
Cemetery of the Polish refugees in Koja

During World War II, 6,443 Poles refugees from occupied Poland, including 704 men (mostly elders), 2,833 women and 2,906 children, were admitted to Uganda. 3,635 Poles stayed in Masindi, 2,800 stayed in Koja, and 8 stayed in Kampala. A consulate of Poland was located in Kampala from 1943 to 1945. After the war, the Polish refugees were gradually repatriated to Europe. In 1948, there were still 1,387 Poles in Uganda. The remaining Polish refugees most likely left Uganda by 1952. A preserved remnant of Polish refugees in Uganda is the Our Lady Queen of Poland Catholic Church near Masindi.

Wanda Błeńska, Polish leprosy expert, and former resistance member during World War II, was the physician-in-chief of the Buluba Hospital from 1951 to 1983. She developed the hospital into an internationally recognized modern centre for leprosy treatment.

Diplomatic relations were established in 1963, shortly after the Ugandan declaration of independence.

== Modern relations ==
Polish Franciscans built deep wells, schools and the Health Center in Kakooge, co-funded by the Polish government. The Polish Medical Mission provided professional courses for Ugandan medical workers, and renovated and donated specialized equipment to the Health Center in Kakooge. The Emergency Medical Team of the Polish Center for International Aid supported a regional hospital in Koboko, where refugees of the South Sudanese Civil War were treated. In July 2021, Poland sent medics to help combat the COVID-19 pandemic in Uganda.

All imports from Uganda to Poland are duty-free and quota-free, with the exception of armaments, as part of the Everything but Arms initiative of the European Union.

== Diplomatic missions ==
- Poland is accredited to Uganda from its embassy in Nairobi.
- Uganda is accredited to Poland from its embassy in Berlin.

== Sources ==
- Wróbel, Janusz (2003). Uchodźcy polscy ze Związku Sowieckiego 1942–1950 (in Polish). Łódź: Instytut Pamięci Narodowej. ISBN 978-83-7629-522-0.
