= John Francis Greif =

Catholic priest

- Bishop Emeritus of Tororo
- Archdiocese: Tororo
- Term ended: 17 August 1968
- Predecessor: John Reesinck
- Successor: James Odongo

Orders
- Ordination: 16 July 1922
- Consecration: 25 July 1951 by David James Mathew
- Rank: Bishop

Personal details
- Born: John Francis Greif; 23 September 1897 Mölten, Austria-Hungary
- Died: 17 August 1968 (aged 70)

John Francis Greif (23 September 1897 – 17 August 1968), was an Austrian-born Roman Catholic priest who served as Bishop of the Diocese of Tororo, in Uganda, from 25 March 1953 until 17 August 1968.

== Background and priesthood ==
Greif was born on 23 September 1897, in the town of Mölten in Austria-Hungary, which is nowadays in northern Italy. He was ordained priest on 16 July 1922, taking the vows of the Saint Joseph's Missionary Society of Mill Hill (Mill Hill Fathers). He served in that capacity until 10 May 1951.

== As bishop ==
He was appointed bishop on 10 May 1951 by Pope Pius XII and was consecrated as Vicar Apostolic of Tororo, Uganda and Titular Bishop of Belabitene on 25 July 1951, by Archbishop David James Mathew†, Titular Archbishop of Apamea in Bithynia, assisted by Bishop John Reesinck†, Titular Bishop of Thinis, and Bishop Vincent Billington†, Titular Bishop of Avissa.

On 25 March 1953, when the Vicariate Apostolic of Tororo was elevated to the Diocese of Tororo, Bishop John Francis Greif was appointed the new Bishop of the Diocese of Tororo, that same day. On 17 August 1968, he died in office, as Bishop of Tororo, at the age of 70 years and 11 months.

== See also ==
- Catholic Church in Uganda
- Mill Hill Fathers

== Succession table at Tororo ==
Preceded by John Reesinck (1938 - 1951)	Bishop of Tororo; 1951 - 1968	Succeeded by James Odongo (1968 - 2007)
