= Denis Kiwanuka Lote =

Ugandan priest and archbishop (1938–2022)

- Archbishop Emeritus of Tororo (Deceased)
- Church: Roman Catholic Church
- Archdiocese: Roman Catholic Archdiocese of Tororo
- See: Roman Catholic Archdiocese of Tororo
- Appointed: 27 June 2007
- Term ended: 2 January 2014
- Predecessor: James Odongo
- Successor: Emmanuel Obbo
- Previous post: Bishop of Kotido (1991–2007)

Orders
- Ordination: 19 December 1965
- Consecration: 18 August 1991 by Emmanuel Wamala
- Rank: Bishop

Personal details
- Born: 25 March 1938 Pallisa District, Uganda
- Died: 24 April 2022 (aged 84) Nsambya Hospital, Kampala, Uganda

Denis Kiwanuka Lote (25 March 1938 – 24 April 2022) was a Ugandan Catholic prelate who served as Archbishop of Tororo from 27 June 2007 until 2 January 2014. He previously served as Bishop of Kotido from 20 May 1991 until 27 June 2007.

== Background and priesthood ==
Lote was born on 25 March 1938 in Kadumure Village, in present-day Pallisa District, in the Eastern Region of Uganda. He was ordained a priest on 19 December 1965. He served as priest in the Archdiocese of Tororo until 20 May 1991.

== As bishop ==
He was appointed Bishop of Kotido on 20 May 1991 and was consecrated a bishop at Kotido on 18 August by Archbishop Emmanuel Wamala, Archbishop of Kampala Archdiocese, assisted by Bishop James Odongo, Bishop of Military Ordinariate of Uganda and Bishop Paul Lokiru Kalanda, Bishop of Roman Catholic Diocese of Fort Portal.

On 27 June 2007, Lote was appointed Archbishop of Tororo and was installed as archbishop on 14 September 2007. He advocated for advance planning, education and preservation of the environment. He retired on 2 January 2014, at the age of 75 years and 9 months, thereafter the Archbishop Emeritus of Tororo.

== Death ==
After twelve days in Nsambya Hospital, Lote died on 24 April 2022, aged 84.

== See also ==
- Lawrence Mukasa
- Joseph Mukwaya
- Emmanuel Obbo
- John Baptist Odama

Catholic Church titles
Preceded by James Odongo	Archbishop of Tororo; 2007–2014	Succeeded by Emmanuel Obbo
