= Damiano Giulio Guzzetti =

Italian Catholic priest and bishop

- Bishop of Moroto
- Church: Roman Catholic Diocese of Moroto
- Archdiocese: Roman Catholic Archdiocese of Tororo
- See: Roman Catholic Archdiocese of Moroto
- Appointed: 20 February 2014
- Term ended: Incumbent
- Predecessor: Henry Apaloryamam Ssentongo
- Successor: Incumbent

Orders
- Ordination: 23 September 1989
- Consecration: 24 May 2014 by Emmanuel Obbo
- Rank: Bishop

Personal details
- Born: Damiano Giulio Guzzetti; 15 July 1959 (age 67) Lombady, Italy

Damiano Giulio Guzzetti (born 15 July 1959), is an Italian-born Roman Catholic priest who serves as Bishop of the Roman Catholic Diocese of Moroto, in Uganda, since 20 February 2014.

== Background and priesthood ==
Guzzetti was born on 15 July 1959, in the town of Lombardy, in the Roman Catholic Archdiocese of Milan, in northern Italy. He professed as a Member of Comboni Missionaries of the Heart of Jesus, on 25 May 1985. He took the Perpetual Vows of the Comboni Missionaries on 27 March 1989. He was ordained a priest on 23 September 1989. He served as a priest of the Comboni Missionaries of the Heart of Jesus until 20 February 2014.

== As bishop ==
He was appointed Bishop of Roman Catholic Diocese of Moroto on 20 February 2014 and was consecrated a bishop at Moroto on 24 May 2014 by Archbishop Emmanuel Obbo, Archbishop of Tororo, assisted by Bishop Henry Apaloryamam Ssentongo, Bishop Emeritus of Moroto and Archbishop Michael August Blume, Titular Archbishop of Alexanum.

== Succession table at Moroto ==
Catholic Church titles
Preceded by Henry Apaloryamam Ssentongo	Bishop of Moroto; 2014 – present	Succeeded by Incumbent

== See also ==
- Father Damien
- Junípero Serra
