= Robert Muhiirwa =

Ugandan priest

The Most Reverend Robert Muhiirwa
- Bishop of Fort Portal
- Church: Roman Catholic Church
- Archdiocese: Roman Catholic Archdiocese of Mbarara
- See: Roman Catholic Diocese of Fort Portal
- Appointed: 18 March 2003
- Predecessor: Paul Lokiru Kalanda †
- Successor: Incumbent

Orders
- Ordination: 11 August 1985
- Consecration: 15 June 2003 by Emmanuel Wamala
- Rank: Bishop

Personal details
- Born: Robert Muhiirwa; 23 October 1958 (age 67) Ibonde Village, Kabarole District, Uganda

Robert Muhiirwa (born 23 October 1958) is a Ugandan Roman Catholic priest who is the Bishop of the Roman Catholic Diocese of Fort Portal. He was appointed bishop of Fort Portal on 18 March 2003.

== Background and priesthood ==
Muhiirwa was born on 23 October 1958, in Ibonde Village, in present-day Kabarole District, in the Toro sub-region, in the Western Region of Uganda. He was ordained a priest on 11 August 1985 and served as priest of the Diocese of Fort Portal, until 18 March 2003.

== As bishop ==
Muhiirwa was appointed Bishop of Fort Portal on 18 March 2003 and was consecrated a bishop at Fort Portal on 15 June 2003 by Cardinal Emmanuel Wamala, Archbishop of Archdiocese of Kampala, assisted by Bishop Paul Lokiru Kalanda† who was the Bishop Emeritus of Fort Portal Diocese and Bishop Deogratias Muganwa Byabazaire†, Bishop of Roman Catholic Diocese of Hoima.

== Succession table ==
Preceded by Paul Lokiru Kalanda (1991 - 2003)	Bishop of Fort Portal; 2003 - present	Succeeded by Incumbent

== See also ==
- Serapio Bwemi Magambo
- Vincent J. McCauley
