= Giuseppe Filippi =

Italian Catholic priest and bishop

- Apostolic Administrator of Kotido Diocese
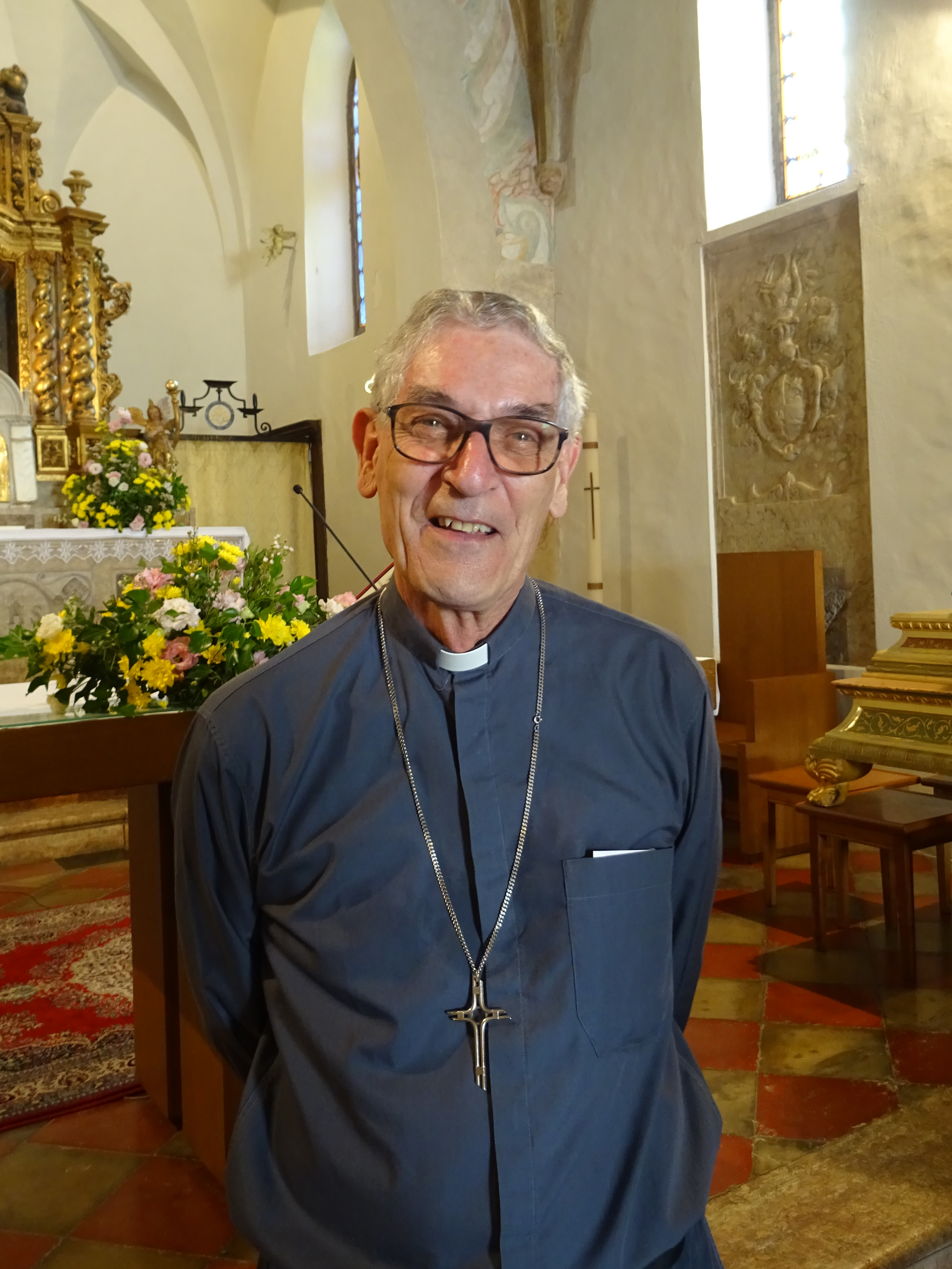
- Church: Catholic Church
- Archdiocese: Archdiocese of Tororo
- See: Diocese of Kotido
- Appointed: 17 August 2009
- Term ended: 25 October 2022
- Predecessor: Denis Kiwanuka Lote
- Successor: Dominic Eibu

Orders
- Ordination: 26 June 1978
- Consecration: 19 December 2009 by Cyprian Kizito Lwanga
- Rank: Bishop

Personal details
- Born: 17 March 1945 (age 80); Trento, Italy

Giuseppe Filippi (born 17 March 1945) is an Italian Roman Catholic priest who served as the Bishop of the Diocese of Kotido, from 17 August 2009 to 25 October 2022. He was appointed Apostolic Administrator of Kotido Diocese on 25 October 2022.

== Background and priesthood ==
Filippi was born on 17 March 1945 in Baselga del Bondone, in the municipality of Trento, Italy, during the administration of the Italian Social Republic. On 28 April 1977, he took vows as a member of the Comboni Missionaries of the Heart of Jesus (MCCI). On 26 January 1978, he was ordained priest in the San Vigilio Cathedral, in the Archdiocese of Trento, by Archbishop Alessandro Maria Gottardi, Archbishop of Trento.

== As bishop ==
Filippi was appointed Bishop of Kotido on 17 August 2009 and was consecrated a bishop the following 19 December, by Archbishop Cyprian Kizito Lwanga, Archbishop of Kampala, assisted by Archbishop Denis Kiwanuka Lote, Archbishop of Tororo and Bishop Giuseppe Franzelli, MCCI, Bishop of Lira.

Bishop Filippi was replaced by Bishop Dominic Eibu, M.C.C.J.

== Succession table ==
| Preceded by Denis Kiwanuka Lote (1991–2007) | Bishop of Kotido; 2009–2022 | Succeeded by Dominic Eibu |
