= Serverus Jjumba =

Ugandan Catholic prelate

Most Reverend Serverus Jjumba
- Bishop of Masaka
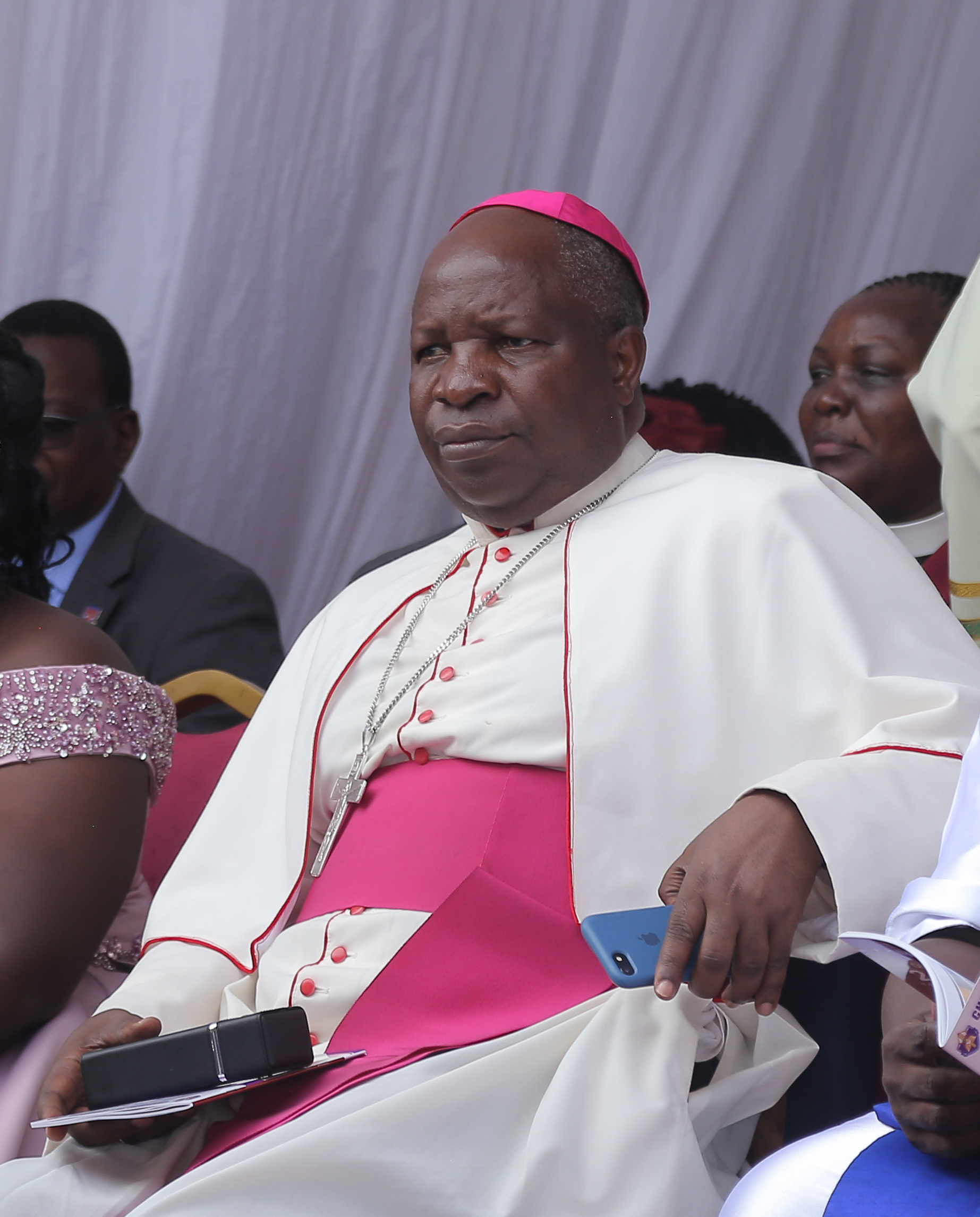
- Archdiocese: Kampala
- Diocese: Masaka
- Appointed: 16 April 2019
- Predecessor: John Baptist Kaggwa
- Successor: Incumbent

Orders
- Ordination: 20 June 1992
- Consecration: 6 July 2019 by John Baptist Kaggwa

Personal details
- Born: 2 August 1962 (age 64)
- Denomination: Roman Catholic
- Education: Makerere University

Serverus Jjumba (born 2 August 1962), is a Ugandan Roman Catholic priest, who serves as the Bishop of the Roman Catholic Diocese of Masaka.

He was appointed to that position on 16 April 2019 and was consecrated bishop on 6 July 2019 at Kitovu, Masaka.

== Early years and education ==
He was born on 2 July 1962 at Katinnyondo, Kyannamukaaka, Masaka District, in the Buganda Region of Uganda, in the Roman Catholic Diocese of Masaka. His parents are the late Herman Jildo Ssebiranda and Leocadia Namazzi.

He attended St. Augustine’s and St. Paul Primary School, Kitovu, Masaka. He then joined Bukalasa Minor Seminary, in Kalungu District. Later he studied at St. Thomas Aquinas Major Seminary, at Katigondo, also in Kalungu District. He then completed his theological studies at St. Mary’s National Major Seminary, at Ggaba, in Kampala, Uganda's capital city. He also has a Master of Education degree and a Diploma in Religious Studies, both awarded by Makerere University, the oldest and largest public university in Uganda.

== Priesthood ==
He was ordained priest on 20 June 1992, at Masaka, when he was 29 years and 11 months old. He served at Bikira Parish from 1991 until 1993. He was the formator and treasurer at Bukalasa Minor Seminary between 1993 and 2000. In 2000, he was appointed as the treasurer of the Catholic Diocese of Masaka, serving in that capacity until 2014. From 2014 until 2019, he was the Vicar General of Masaka Diocese.

On Tuesday, 16 April 2019, Pope Francis appointed Monsignor Serverus Jjumba, the new bishop of Masaka Diocese, replacing Bishop John Baptist Kaggwa, who had tendered his resignation, having attained the Mandatory retirement age of 75 years, on 23 March 2018.

Bishop Kaggwa remained the apostolic administrator of Masaka Diocese until "the day of the canonical possession by the new bishop".

== As bishop ==
He was consecrated bishop, on 6 July 2019 by his predecessor Bishop John Baptist Kaggwa, assisted by Bishop Lambert Bainomugisha Auxiliary Bishop of the Archdiocese of Mbarara, Bishop Joseph Anthony Zziwa Bishop of Kiyinda-Mityana, Archbishop Cyprian Kizito Lwanga, Archbishop of Kampala and Archbishop Luigi Bianco, Titular Archbishop of Falerone and Papal Nuncio to Uganda.

Bishop Serverus Jjumba is the president of the official social development arm of the Catholic Church in Uganda, Caritas Uganda.

== See also ==
- Catholic Church in Uganda
- Joseph Kiwanuka
- Emmanuel Wamala

== Succession table ==
Preceded by John Baptist Kaggwa (1998 - 2019)	Bishop of Masaka; 2019 - present	Succeeded by Incumbent
