= Erasmus Desiderius Wandera =

Ugandan priest (1930–2022)

His Excellency, The Most Reverend Erasmus Desiderius Wandera
- Bishop Emeritus of Soroti
- Archdiocese: Tororo
- See: Roman Catholic Diocese of Soroti
- Appointed: 29 March 1981
- Term ended: 27 June 2007
- Predecessor: Post created
- Successor: Emmanuel Obbo

Orders
- Ordination: 27 December 1956
- Consecration: 29 March 1981 by Emmanuel Kiwanuka Nsubuga

Personal details
- Born: Erasmus Desiderius Wandera; 16 April 1930 Dabani, Busia District, Protectorate of Uganda
- Died: 8 December 2022 (aged 92) Mbale, Uganda

Erasmus Desiderius Wandera (16 April 1930 – 8 December 2022) was a Ugandan Catholic prelate who served as the Bishop of Soroti from 29 March 1981 until 27 June 2007.

Wandera died on 8 December 2022 at the age of 92.

== Background and priesthood ==
Wandera was born on 16 April 1930 in Dabani, in present-day Busia District, in the Eastern Region of Uganda. On 27 December 1956, he was ordained a priest. He served as a priest until 29 November 1980.

== As bishop ==
Wandera was appointed Bishop of Soroti on 29 November 1980 and was consecrated a bishop on 29 March 1981, by Cardinal Emmanuel Kiwanuka Nsubuga, Archbishop of Kampala, assisted by Bishop James Odongo, Bishop of Tororo, and Archbishop Henri Lemaître†, Titular Archbishop of Tongres. Wandera served as bishop until 2007. On 27 Jun 2007, Bishop Erasmus Desiderius Wandera retired. He passed on the feast of the Immaculate Conception on 8 December 2022. He was buried inside church on Thursday december 15th 2022.

Catholic Church titles
Preceded by Post created	Bishop of Soroti; 1981–2007	Succeeded by Emmanuel Obbo
