= Joseph Oliach Eciru =

Ugandan prelate (born 1970)

The Most Reverend Joseph Eciru Oliach
- Catholic Bishop of Soroti, Uganda
- Church: Catholic Church
- Archdiocese: Roman Catholic Archdiocese of Tororo
- See: Roman Catholic Diocese of Soroti
- Appointed: 19 March 2019
- Installed: 25 May 2019
- Predecessor: Emmanuel Obbo (27 June 2007 - 2 January 2014)
- Successor: Incumbent

Orders
- Ordination: 9 August 2003
- Consecration: 35 May 2019 by Emmanuel Obbo]
- Rank: Bishop

Personal details
- Born: Joseph Oliach Eciru; 11 August 1970 (age 55) Gweri sub-county, Soroti District, Uganda

Styles of Joseph Oliach Eciru
- Reference style: His Grace; The Right Reverend
- Spoken style: Your Grace
- Religious style: Bishop

Joseph Oliach Eciru is a Catholic prelate, who serves as the Bishop of Roman Catholic Diocese of Soroti since 25 May 2019. Before then, from 9 August 2003 until 25 May 2019, he served as a priest of the same Catholic See. He was appointed bishop by Pope Francis. He was consecrated at Soroti on 25 May 2019 by Emmanuel Obbo, Archbishop of Tororo.

== Early life and education ==
Eciru was born 11 August 1970 at Ookai Village, Dokolo Parish, Gweri sub-county in Soroti District. His parents are John Francis Oliac and Ann Maria Aguti.

He attended Gweri Primary School and St. Aloysius Demonstration Primary School in Ngora. He studied at St. Peter's Seminary Madera, in the city of Soroti for his O-Level studies. He then completed his A-Level education at St. Pius X Seminary in Nagongera, Tororo District.

He was ordained a priest on 9 August 2003, at St. Patrick's Catholic Parish, Madera by Bishop Erasmus Desiderius Wandera. Eciru later obtained a Licentiate in Sacred Scripture at the Pontifical Biblical Institute (Biblicum), in Rome. This was followed by a Doctorate in Biblical Theology from Pontifical Urbaniana University, also in Rome.

== Priesthood ==
Father Eciru served as a lecturer of Latin at Saint Peter's Seminary Madera, before he lectured Sacred Scripture at Saint Paul's National Seminary Kinyamasika, in Fort Portal, in the Western Region of Uganda. At the time of his appointment as Bishop of Soroti Diocese he was serving as Lecturer of Sacred Scripture at Saint Mary's National Seminary in Ggaba, Kampala.

== Bishop ==
Pope Francis appointed him bishop on 19 March 2019. He was consecrated bishop at Soroti on 25 May 2019, by Archbishop Emmanuel Obbo, of Roman Catholic Archdiocese of Tororo, assisted by Archbishop Luigi Bianco, Titular Archbishop of Falerone and Bishop Francis Aquirinus Kibira, Bishop of Roman Catholic Diocese of Kasese.

== See also ==
- Roman Catholicism in Uganda

== Succession table ==
Catholic Church titles
Preceded by Emmanuel Obbo (27 June 2007 - 2 January 2014)	Bishop of Soroti (since 19 March 2019)	Succeeded by (Incumbent)
