= Joseph Mugenyi Sabiiti =

Ugandan priest (born 1948)

Bishop Joseph Mugenyi Sabiiti
- Title: Auxiliary Bishop of Roman Catholic Diocese of Fort Portal

Personal life
- Born: 9 May 1948 (age 78) Nyansozi Village, Kabarole District, Uganda
- Known for: Pastoral service

Joseph Mugenyi Sabiiti (born 9 May 1948), is a Roman Catholic priest, who is the Auxiliary Bishop of the Roman Catholic Diocese of Fort Portal, in Uganda. He was appointed bishop on 2 January 1999.

== Early life and priesthood ==
Sabiiti was born on 9 May 1948, at Nyansozi Village, in present-day Kabarole District in the Western Region of Uganda. He was ordained priest on 1 June 1975 at Fort Portal. He served as priest in the Roman Catholic Diocese of Fort Portal until 2 January 1999.

== As bishop ==
He was appointed Auxiliary Bishop of the Roman Catholic Diocese of Fort Portal, on 2 January 1999. He was consecrated as bishop on 24 April 1999 at Fort Portal by Bishop Paul Lokiru Kalanda†, Bishop of Fort Portal, assisted by Bishop Deogratias Muganwa Byabazaire†, Bishop of Hoima and Archbishop John Baptist Odama, Archbishop of Gulu.

Sabiiti retired in July 2023 after serving the diocese for 24 years. He was replaced by Robert Muhira as the new Bishop of Fort Portal.

== See also ==
- Uganda Martyrs
- Roman Catholicism in Uganda
