= John Baptist Kaggwa =

Ugandan Catholic bishop (1943–2021)

The Most Reverend John Baptist Kaggwa
- Bishop Emeritus of Masaka, Uganda
- Church: Catholic Church
- Archdiocese: Roman Catholic Archdiocese of Kampala
- See: Roman Catholic Diocese of Masaka
- Appointed: 19 December 1994
- Installed: 24 June 1995
- Term ended: 16 April 2019
- Predecessor: Adrian Kivumbi Ddungu
- Successor: Serverus Jjumba
- Previous post: Coadjutor Bishop of Masaka (1994–1998)

Orders
- Ordination: 12 December 1971
- Consecration: 24 June 1995 by Adrian Kivumbi Ddungu

Personal details
- Born: 23 March 1943 Bulenga, Wakiso District, Uganda
- Died: 20 January 2021 (aged 77) Mulago National Referral Hospital, Kampala, Uganda

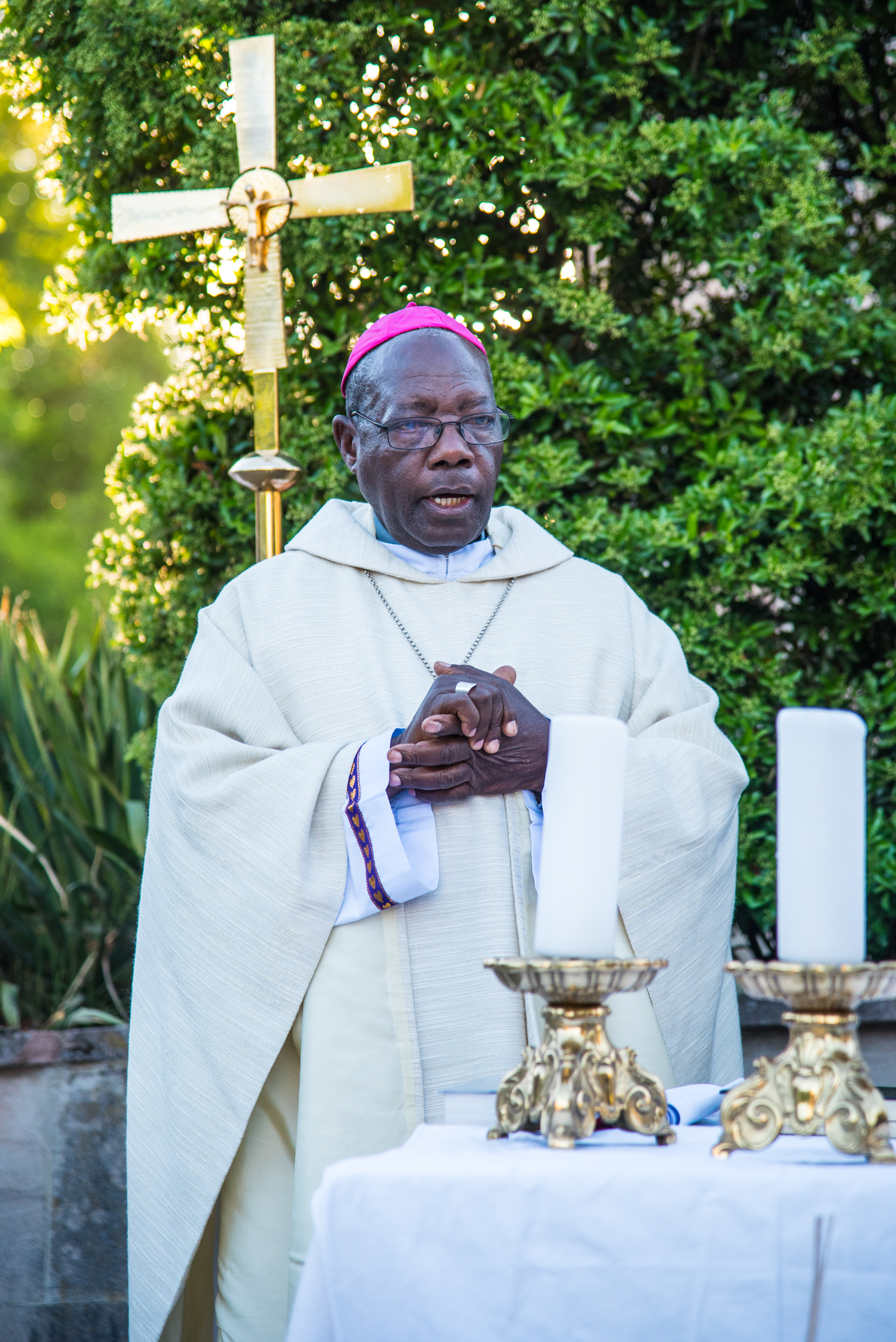
Bishop Kaggwa in 2018.

Styles of John Baptist Kaggwa
- Reference style: The Most Reverend
- Religious style: Bishop

John Baptist Kaggwa (23 March 1943 – 20 January 2021) was a Ugandan Catholic prelate who was Bishop of the Diocese of Masaka, where he served as the Ordinary from 10 January 1998 until his retirement on 16 April 2019. For a period of more than three years, from 19 December 1994 until 10 January 1998, Kaggwa served as Coadjutor Bishop of Masaka, Uganda.

== Background and education ==
He was born on 23 March 1943 at Bulenga, Busiro County, Wakiso District, in the Buganda Region of Uganda. He attended Lubaga Boys Primary School from 1952 until he completed Primary 6 in 1957. He then joined Kisubi Minor Seminary in 1958. While at Kisubi, he studied Latin. Later he studied at Katigondo Major Seminary, where he studied Philosophy.

In 1965, Archbishop Joseph Kiwanuka sent him to study at Pontifical Urban University, in Rome, on scholarship. He was ordained deacon in May 1970 in Rome. He held a Doctor of Philosophy degree in Canon Law and Secular Law, awarded by Pontifical Urban University.

== Priesthood ==
He was ordained a priest on 12 December 1971 in Rome, at the age of 28. Following his doctoral studies, he was appointed vice-rector of the Pontifical College of St Paul, in Rome, for five years. He returned to Uganda in the 1980s and was appointed the first rector of St. Mbaaga Seminary at Ggaba.

On 19 December 1994, he was appointed the coadjutor Bishop of Masaka. He was consecrated bishop on 24 June 1995 by his predecessor, Bishop Adrian Kivumbi Ddungu. He succeeded as Bishop of Masaka, Uganda on 10 January 1998. Under his leadership the diocese supported development projects including the construction of new schools, homes, shops and farms. The income from these projects helped fund the diocese and a shopping arcade was named after Kaggwa. During his time as bishop the diocese set up its own radio station, Centenary FM.

On 6 July 2019, Kaggwa was the Principal Consecrator of his replacement, Bishop Serverus Jjumba as the Ordinary of Masaka Diocese. Kaggwa then retired as bishop but continued to work in the diocese as directed by Bishop Jjumba. Three days after his retirement Kaggwa called for private investigators to look into the murder of Brother Norbert Emmanuel Mugarura, the Superior General of the Brothers of St. Charles Lwanga religious order who was killed in university premises.

== COVID-19 pandemic ==
In June 2020, he asked the Ugandan government to consider postponing the 2021 Ugandan general election because of the COVID-19 pandemic. Kaggwa was concerned that with mass rallies and canvassing events replaced with virtual campaigning the electorate not be engaged. He feared the measures would favour incumbent candidates and proposed delaying the election by up to two years. At the same time Kaggwa campaigned for arcade shop-owners to be allowed to reopen, as shopping malls had been allowed to do so.

== Activism ==
Kaggwa is known as one of the controversial bishops who speaks without fear or favour. He advocated for the freedom of Opposition leader Kiiza Besigye and compeled the Uganda government to release him from jail. Kaggwa often called for peacful handling of political issues. As a man who loved peace, Kaggwa often gave advice to politicians to uphold peace as a way to uphold the social wellbeing of Ugandans. He was instrumental in bringing peace between the National Resistance Movement, Democratic Party and Uganda People's congress. Kaggwa once threatened to go on the streets to demonstrate over poor roads in the country. In July 2020, Kaggwa advised government to postpone elections for the safety of Ugandans against COVID-19.

On 17 October a prayer event held by Kaggwa for members of the Mbogo Clan at Singo was raided by police and the Ugandan military. Tear gas and live bullets were used to disperse attendees. It is believed the action was related to the expected attendance of Bobi Wine, a Mbogo member, at the event. Several Wine supporters had previously been arrested by the security services. The police later apologised to the church and to Kaggwa for using tear gas during the operation.

== Death ==
Kaggwa died on 20 January 2021, of COVID-19, which he had first contracted two months prior during the COVID-19 pandemic in Uganda. He was laid to rest on 23 January 2021 at the Bukalasa Priest's chapel.

== See also ==
- Catholic Church in Uganda
- Cyprian Kizito Lwanga
- Uganda Martyrs

== Succession table ==
| Preceded by Adrian Kivumbi Ddungu | Bishop of Masaka; 1998–2019 | Succeeded by Serverus Jjumba |
