= Diocese of Soroti =

Diocese of Soroti may refer to the following ecclesiastical jurisdictions:

- Anglican Diocese of Soroti (f. 1961), Eastern Uganda
- Roman Catholic Diocese of Soroti (f. 1980), Eastern Uganda
