= Villa Maria, Uganda =

Villa Maria
- Map of Uganda showing the location of Villa Maria
- Coordinates: 00°13′42″S 31°44′50″E
- Country: Uganda
- Region: Central Uganda
- District: Kalungu District
- Elevation: 1,190 m (3,900 ft)
- Time zone: UTC+3 (EAT)

Villa Maria is a village in Kalungu District in the Central Region of Uganda.

== Location ==
Villa Maria is approximately 15 kilometres (9.3 mi) northwest of Masaka, the nearest large city. It is approximately 62 kilometres (39 mi), by road, southeast of the town of Sembabule. Villa Maria is approximately 132 kilometres (82 mi), by road, southwest of Kampala, the capital and largest city of Uganda. The geographical coordinates of Villa Maria are 00 13 42S, 31 44 50E (Latitude: -0.228345; Longitude: 31.747230).

== Landmarks ==
The landmarks within the town limits or near the town include:

- offices of Villa Maria Village Council
- Villa Maria Catholic Cathedral
- Villa Maria Hospital
- Villa Maria central market
- Bukalasa National Minor Seminary
- Katigondo National Major Seminary
- Sembabule–Villa Maria Road.

== See also ==
- Kalungu
