= Paul Lokiru Kalanda =

Ugandan priest (1927-2018)

- Bishop of Fort Portal
- Church: Catholic Church
- Diocese: Diocese of Fort Portal
- In office: 17 June 1991 – 18 March 2003
- Predecessor: Serapio Bwemi Magambo
- Successor: Robert Muhiirwa
- Previous post: Bishop of Moroto (1980-1991)

Orders
- Ordination: 21 December 1957
- Consecration: 22 March 1981 by Emmanuel Nsubuga

Personal details
- Born: 27 February 1927 Buwunde (in present-day Masaka District), Protectorate of Uganda, British Empire
- Died: 19 August 2015 (aged 88)

Paul Lokiru Kalanda (27 February 1927 – 19 August 2015) was a Catholic priest who served as Bishop of the Diocese of Moroto from 1980 until 1991 and as Bishop of the Roman Catholic Diocese of Fort Portal from 1991 until 2003.

== Background and priesthood ==
Kalanda was born on 27 February 1927 at Buwunde Village, Kyannamukaaka sub-county, in present-day Masaka District, in the Buganda Region of Uganda. His father was Simon Ziryawulamu Kalanda and mother, Agnes Aliraba Nakachwa. He was born with 3 brothers and 1 sister. He was ordained priest on 21 December 1957.

He served as priest in the Roman Catholic Diocese of Masaka until 29 November 1980, when he was appointed bishop.

== Education ==
Kalanda went to Kabwoko Boys Primary School for his primary and Bukalasa National Minor Seminary between 1942 and 1948. In 1949, he was accepted to join Katigondo National Major Seminary for his higher ecclesiastical studies and formation before he was sent to the Urbano University Rome from 1955 to 1958 to complete his studies and formation.

== As bishop ==
He was appointed Bishop of the Roman Catholic Diocese of Moroto, in Uganda, on 29 November 1980. He was consecrated bishop on 22 March 1981, by Cardinal Emmanuel Kiwanuka Nsubuga, Archbishop of Kampala, assisted by Bishop Adrian Kivumbi Ddungu, Bishop of Masaka and Bishop Sisto Mazzoldi†, Apostolic Vicar of Bahr el-Gebel.

On 17 June 1991, Kalanda was appointed Bishop of the Roman Catholic Diocese of Fort Portal, serving in that capacity until he retired on 18 March 2003.

He died on 19 August 2015, as Bishop Emeritus of Fort Portal, Uganda, at the age of 88 years and 5 months.

== Retirement ==
After his retirement in 2003, he was appointed as Apostolic Administer of Lira Diocese.

== Works and career ==
Kalanda contributed to the set up of Catholic Higher Institute of Eastern Africa (CHIEA) in Nairobi which is now known as the Catholic University of Eastern Africa (CUEA). He taught at Kitigondo National Major Seminary, and African Social Anthropology, Notre Dame University in Indiana, USA.

== See also ==
- Serapio Bwemi Magambo
- Vincent J. McCauley
- Robert Muhiirwa
- Emmanuel Kiwanuka Nsubuga
- Roman Catholic Diocese of Fort Portal
- Roman Catholic Diocese of Moroto
- Catholic Church in Uganda

== Quotes ==
- The research into symbols is essential to interpret the supernatural world, not only the one outside us but also the one inside us through the sanctifying grace and the gifts of the Holy Spirit. Keeping in mind the love of Africans for rituals, it is important that their meaning interiorises the values involved.
  - Bishop Paul L. KALANDA (Bishop of Fort Portal, Uganda) (1994) The African Synod
