= Serapio Bwemi Magambo =

Ugandan Catholic priest and bishop

The Most Reverend Serapio Bwemi Magambo
- Bishop Emeritus of Fort Portal
- Church: Roman Catholic Church
- Archdiocese: Roman Catholic Archdiocese of Mbarara
- See: Roman Catholic Diocese of Fort Portal
- Appointed: 26 June 1969
- Term ended: 17 June 1991
- Predecessor: Vincent Joseph McCauley †
- Successor: Paul Lokiru Kalanda †

Orders
- Ordination: 15 December 1957
- Consecration: 1 August 1969 by Pope Paul VI
- Rank: Bishop

Personal details
- Born: Serapio Bwemi Magambo; May 8, 1928 Kyaka Village, Kyegegwa District, Uganda
- Died: February 8, 1995 (aged 66)

Serapio Bwemi Magambo (8 May 1928 – 8 February 1995), was a Ugandan Catholic priest who served as the Bishop of the Roman Catholic Diocese of Fort Portal, from 16 November 1972 until his resignation on 17 June 1991. Prior to that, he served as the Auxiliary Bishop of Fort Portal from 26 June 1969 until 16 November 1972.

== Background and priesthood ==
Magambo was born on 8 May 1928, in Kiranzi Village, in present-day Kyegegwa District, in the Tooro sub-region, in the Western Region of Uganda. He was ordained a priest on 15 December 1957 and served as priest of the Diocese of Fort Portal, until 26 June 1969.

== As bishop ==
Magambo was appointed Auxiliary Bishop of Fort Portal on 26 June 1969 and was consecrated a bishop at Kololo, in the Archdiocese of Kampala, by Pope Paul VI, assisted by Archbishop Sergio Pignedoli, Titular Archbishop of Iconium, and Archbishop Emmanuel Kiwanuka Nsubuga, Archbishop of Kampala.

He served as auxiliary bishop of Fort Portal until 16 November 1972, when he was appointed bishop of the diocese. He served as the ordinary of the diocese until he resigned on 17 June 1991. He died on 8 February 1995, as Bishop Emeritus of Fort Portal, Uganda, at the age of 66 years and 9 months.

== Succession table ==
Preceded by Vincent J. McCauley (1961–1972)	Bishop of Fort Portal; 1972–1991	Succeeded by Paul Lokiru Kalanda (1991–2003)
