= Buluba Hospital =

St. Francis Hospital Buluba
- Roman Catholic Diocese of Jinja

Geography
- Location: Buluba, Mayuge District, Eastern Region, Uganda
- Coordinates: 00°29′32″N 33°23′06″E

Organisation
- Care system: Public
- Type: General

Services
- Emergency department: I
- Beds: 100

History
- Founded: 1934

Links
- Other links: Hospitals in Uganda; Medical education in Uganda

Buluba Hospital, whose formal name is St. Francis Hospital Buluba, is a community hospital in Uganda. It is owned and operated by the Roman Catholic Diocese of Jinja.

== Location ==
The hospital is located in the village of Buluba, in Baitambogwe sub county, Bunya west constituency in Mayuge District, Busoga sub-region, Eastern Region of Uganda. This location is approximately 16 kilometres (10 mi), by road, north-west of Mayuge, where the district headquarters are located. Buluba Hospital is approximately 21 kilometres (13 mi), by road, southwest of Iganga General Hospital, in Iganga, the nearest large town. The coordinates of Buluba Hospital are 0°29'32.0"N, 33°23'06.0"E (Latitude:0.492222; Longitude:33.385000).

== Overview ==
St. Francis Hospital Buluba, is a rural community hospital, that serves the population of Mayuge District. It is the only General Hospital in the district. Due to the good quality of services rendered, many patients travel from other parts of the country to seek services at this facility.

== History ==
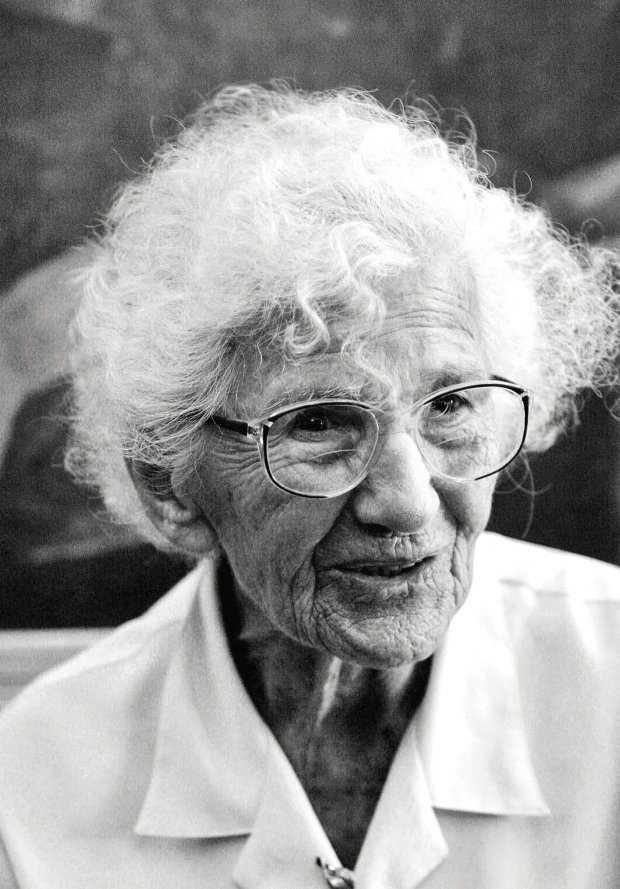
Wanda Błeńska, Polish physician and leprosy expert who developed the Buluba Hospital

The hospital was founded in 1934 by the Franciscan Missionary Sisters for Africa. Eventually, the Franciscan Sisters handed over the hospital to the Roman Catholic Diocese of Jinja. The diocese entrusted the management and administration of the hospital to a native religious congregation of Franciscan Sisters, the Little Sisters of St. Francis. In the beginning, the hospital specialized in the treatment of leprosy, which was endemic in the area. Wanda Błeńska, a Polish expert in tropical diseases, worked there for over 40 years (1951-1994) and developed the hospital into an internationally recognized centre for leprosy treatment. Later, the hospital added tuberculosis to the diseases it specializes in. Buluba Hospital maintains a prosthetic unit (initiated by Błeńska), one of the few in the country. As of January 2014, while the hospital attended to all general medical problems, they were adept and experienced in handling patients with leprosy and tuberculosis. Often, these patients also suffered from HIV/AIDS.

== See also ==
- List of hospitals in Uganda
