= Diocese of Jinja =

Diocese of the Catholic Church in Uganda

Coordinates: 0.4510°N 33.2124°E

Diocese of Jinja Dioecesis Gingianus
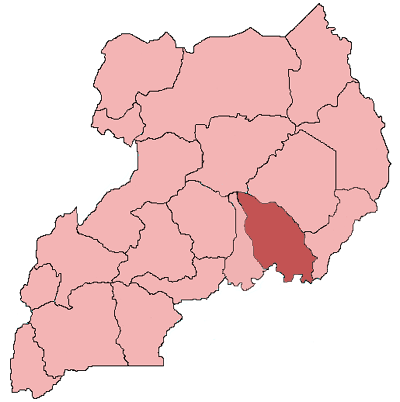
- Roman Catholic Diocese of Jinja

Location
- Country: Uganda
- Ecclesiastical province: Archdiocese of Tororo
- Metropolitan: Roman Catholic Archdiocese of Tororo
- Headquarters: Jinja, Eastern Region, Uganda

Statistics
- Area: 8,917 km^{2} (3,443 sq mi)
- Population: Total; Catholics: (as of 2023); 4,750,000; 960,100 (20.2%)
- Parishes: 33

Information
- Denomination: Catholic Church
- Sui iuris church: Latin Church
- Rite: Roman Rite
- Established: 10 June 1948; 78 years ago
- Cathedral: Sacred Heart Cathedral, Jinja
- Secular priests: 149 (87 Diocesan, 62 Religious Orders)

Current leadership
- Pope: Leo XIV
- Bishop: Sede vacante
- Metropolitan Archbishop: Emmanuel Obbo, A.J.
- Apostolic Administrator: Emmanuel Obbo, A.J.

The Roman Catholic Diocese of Jinja (Latin: Gingian(us)) is a diocese located in the city of Jinja in the ecclesiastical province of Tororo in Uganda.

== History ==
- 10 June 1948: Established as Apostolic Vicariate of Kampala from the Apostolic Vicariate of Upper Nile
- 25 March 1953: Promoted as Diocese of Kampala
- 5 August 1966: Renamed as Diocese of Jinja

== Leadership ==
=== Apostolic Vicar of Kampala ===
- Vincent Billington, M.H.M. (13 May 1948 – 25 March 1953 see below)

=== Bishop of Kampala ===
- Vincent Billington, M.H.M. (see above 25 March 1953 – 3 May 1965), resigned
- Joseph B. Willigers, M.H.M. (13 July 1967 – 2 March 2010), retired
- Charles Martin Wamika (2 March 2010 – 22 October 2025)
  - Apostolic Administrator Emmanuel Obbo, A.J. (29 October 2025 – Present), Archbishop of Tororo

== See also ==
- Roman Catholicism in Uganda
- Jinja
