= Diocese of Kotido =

Diocese of the Catholic Church in Uganda

Coordinates: 3.0134°N 34.1174°E

Diocese of Kotido Dioecesis Kotidoensis

Location
- Country: Uganda
- Metropolitan: Roman Catholic Archdiocese of Tororo

Statistics
- Area: 14,775 km^{2} (5,705 sq mi)
- Population: Total; Catholics: (as of 2004); 283,640; 130,150 (45.9%)

Information
- Sui iuris church: Latin Church
- Rite: Roman Rite

Current leadership
- Pope: Leo XIV
- Bishop: Dominic Eibu

Map
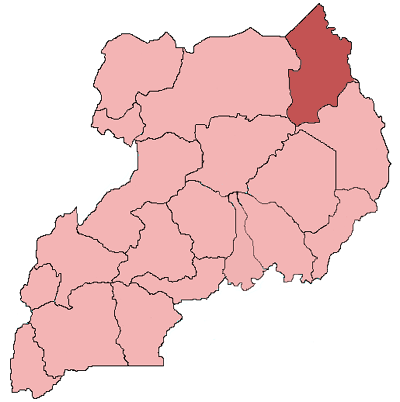

The Roman Catholic Diocese of Kotido (Latin: Kotidoën(sis)) is a diocese in the ecclesiastical province of Tororo in Uganda.

== History ==
- May 20, 1991: Established as Diocese of Kotido from the Diocese of Moroto

== Leadership ==
- Bishops of Kotido (Roman rite)
  - Bishop Denis Kiwanuka Lote (20 May 1991 – 27 June 2007), appointed Archbishop of Tororo
  - Bishop Giuseppe Filippi (21 December 2009 – 25 October 2022)
  - Bishop Dominic Eibu (since 25 October 2022)

== See also ==
- Roman Catholicism in Uganda
- Kotido

== Sources ==
- catholic-hierarchy
