= Brothers of St. Charles Lwanga =

- Abbreviation: B.S.C.L
- Nickname: Bannakaroli Brothers
- Formation: c. AD 1927; 99 years ago
- Founder: Henri Streicher
- Type: Catholic religious order
- Headquarters: Kiteredde, Uganda
- Website: bannakaroli.org

The Brothers of St. Charles Lwanga are the members of a Catholic religious institute of Religious Brothers which was founded in Uganda in 1927. They are dedicated to the care of youth, traditionally through education, but they currently also serve in the areas of the care of children suffering from or orphaned due to HIV/AIDS. They follow the Ignatian spirituality. Locally they are called the Bannakaroli Brothers, so named in honor of the leader of the Martyrs of Uganda, St. Charles Lwanga.

The Brothers were founded in 1927 by Bishop Henri Streicher, M.Afr. (1863-1952), the first Vicar Apostolic of Uganda. He founded the Brothers under his authority to assist the mission of the Catholic Church in that nation with the education of the boys of the region. The Brothers established their motherhouse in Kiteredde, Uganda, and soon opened schools for primary and secondary education and provided vocational training.

== Bannakaroli schools ==
Among the institutions the Brothers currently operate in Uganda are:

- St. Kizito Mbuye Primary School in Uganda, which was established in 1986. The school educates Ugandan children who have been left orphans due to the death of their parents from AIDS. It currently teaches over 1,000 boys and girls. Upon completion of their studies, the children normally move on to one of two other facilities run by the Brothers.
- Kiteredde High School was founded in 1960 as a preparatory high school for boys considering joining the Brothers. In the 1990s, however, it was opened to mostly HIV/AIDS orphaned school-aged children from all religious denominations. Today, the school has about 700 students whom it educates without charge.
- The Kiteredde Vocational Institute was established in 1980 in Kyotera as a residential vocational training center for young people, especially geared to those who have dropped out of formal education. It has a student body of about 350 boys and girls. These schools are located in the Rakai District of the country, a region which was in the forefront of the Uganda–Tanzania War and the subsequent AIDS epidemic.
- St. Charles Lwanga School was opened in Nairobi in 1991 to provide support and education to children in the poorest sectors of the city, through education and working with street children.
- St Charles Lwanga Children's Centre is a charitable institution in Ruai-Nairobi, Kenya, which provides for children with disabilities and special needs. It was established through the efforts of Brother John Kennedy Oronjo Omondi of St Charles Lwanga Christian Brothers, in 2010. The goal of the centre is to empower these challenged children and provide them with life skills and technical abilities. The school operates on donations from benevolent benefactors. www.lwangachildren.com

The Brothers now also operate in Kenya and Tanzania.
