= Joseph B. Willigers =

Roman Catholic bishop in Uganda

The Right Reverend Joseph B. Willigers MHM
- Bishop of Jinja
- Installed: 1967
- Term ended: 2010
- Predecessor: Diocese established

Personal details
- Born: 26 October 1930 Netherlands
- Died: 30 September 2012 (aged 81) Oosterbeek, Netherlands
- Denomination: Roman Catholic
- Occupation: Bishop
- Education: St. Joseph's Missionary Society of Mill Hill
- Motto: De petra melle ("With honey from the rock")

Joseph Bernard Louis Willigers MHM (October 26, 1930 – September 30, 2012) was a Dutch Roman Catholic bishop in Uganda. He was the bishop of the Roman Catholic Diocese of Jinja. He was a member of the Mill Hill Missionaries religious order.

== Early life and education ==
Willigers was born in the Netherlands on 26 October 1930. He studied philosophy and theology at St Joseph's College in Mill Hill, London, before his ordination in 1955. He also studied canon law at the Pontifical Gregorian University in Rome after his ordination and completed these studies by 1958.

On 10 May 1959, he came to Uganda for missionary work and was assigned as a professor at Ggaba Seminary, Kampala.

== Career ==
Willigers worked in education and basic pastoral care in Uganda and Kenya. In 1960, he was transferred from Ggaba to Nagalama. In April 1960, he was transferred to Kenya where he was a curate at the Shikoti parish and in 1965 he became the vicar general of the Diocese of Kisumu under the Dutch bishop Jan de Reeper.

In 1967, Willigers was named bishop and became the first bishop of the Diocese of Jinja east of the Ugandan capital of Kampala. In 1962, he was appointed as the parish priest of Kaiboi in Kenya.

On 3 December 1967, he was ordained to the episcopate by Archbishop Emmanuel Nsubuga, later Uganda's first cardinal. Willigers led the faithful of his diocese until he retired in March 2010.

In 2009, he participated in the synod of bishops' Assembly of Africa. His contacts with his native diocese of Roermond continued through the years, as Roermond financially supported projects in Jinja.

== Pastoral and social legacy ==
Willigers established the Mpumudde Home of the Elderly, the St. Muggaga Boys' Home and the Iganga Babies' Home. He also founded the Justice and Peace Commission to promote civic education, human rights and social harmony.

== Death ==
Returning to the Netherlands in ill health, Willigers took up residence in the Vrijland mission house in Oosterbeek, where he died in the early morning on 30 September 2012 in the presence of his sister.

== See also ==
- Albert Edward Baharagate Akiiki
- Paul Kamuza Bakyenga
- Vincent Billington
- Deogratias Muganwa Byabazaire
