= Military Ordinariate of Uganda =

Military ordinariate of the Roman Catholic Church

Military Ordinariate of Uganda Ordinariatus Militaris Uganda

Location
- Country: Uganda

Information
- Denomination: Roman Catholic
- Rite: Latin Rite
- Established: 20 January 1964 (62 years ago)

Current leadership
- Pope: Leo XIV
- Bishop: Sede Vacante

The Military Ordinariate of Uganda is a military ordinariate of the Roman Catholic Church. Immediately subject to the Holy See, it provides pastoral care to Roman Catholics serving in Uganda People's Defence Force and their families.

== History ==
It was created as a military vicariate on 20 January 1964, and elevated to a military ordinariate on 21 July 1986.

== Office holders ==
=== Military vicars ===
- Cipriano Biyehima Kihangire (appointed 20 January 1964 – resigned 5 January 1985)
- James Odongo (appointed 5 January 1985 – became Military Ordinary 21 July 1986 see below)

=== Military ordinaries ===
- James Odongo (see above, appointed 21 July 1986 – died 4 December 2020)
