= James Odongo =

Ugandan bishop (1931–2020)

His Excellency, The Most Reverend James Odongo
- Archbishop Emeritus of Tororo
- Church: Roman Catholic Church
- Archdiocese: Roman Catholic Archdiocese of Tororo
- In office: 5 January 1985 – 27 June 2007
- Predecessor: Cipriano Biyehima Kihangire
- Successor: Denis Kiwanuka Lote
- Previous post: Archbishop Emeritus of Archdiocese of Tororo

Orders
- Ordination: 16 February 1965 by Laurean Rugambwa †
- Rank: Bishop

Personal details
- Born: 27 March 1931 Molo, Tororo District, Uganda
- Died: 4 December 2020 (aged 89) Nsambya Hospital, Kampala, Uganda

Styles of James Odongo
- Reference style: His Grace; The Most Reverend
- Spoken style: Your Grace
- Religious style: Bishop

James Odongo (27 March 1931 – 4 December 2020) was a Ugandan Catholic prelate who served as Archbishop of Tororo from 5 January 1985 until his retirement on 27 June 2007.

He had also served as Auxiliary Bishop of Tororo from 25 November 1964 until 19 August 1968.

== Background and priesthood ==
Odongo was born in the village of Molo, in present-day Tororo District, in the Eastern Region of Uganda. His twin sibling, Father Alfred Opio, predeceased him. He was ordained priest on 22 December 1956 and served as priest in the Diocese of Tororo until 25 November 1964.

== As bishop ==
Odongo was appointed by Pope Paul VI as the ordinated titular bishop of Bahanna on 25 November 1964 and auxiliary bishop of Tororo. He was consecrated as bishop on 16 February 1965 by Cardinal Laurean Rugambwa†, Bishop of Roman Catholic Diocese of Bukoba, assisted by Bishop John Francis Greif, MHM†, Bishop of Tororo and Vincent Joseph McCauley, Congregation of Holy Cross†, Bishop of the Roman Catholic Diocese of Fort Portal.

On 19 August 1968, he was appointed Bishop of the Roman Catholic Diocese of Tororo. On 5 January 1985, Pope John Paul II appointed him to concurrently serve as the bishop of the Military Ordinate of Uganda. As of July 2019, he was the incumbent diocesan Ordinary of that diocese.

On 2 January 1999, Odongo became the first Archbishop of the Roman Catholic Archdiocese of Tororo. He retired from that position on 27 June 2007, thus becoming Archbishop Emeritus of Tororo, Uganda. As of January 2017, following the death of Right Reverend Colin Cameron Davis, Bishop Emeritus of Ngong Diocese, in Kenya, Archbishop Odongo became the last surviving representative of AMECEA Region at the Vatican II Council, which was held between 1962 and 1965.

== Retirement and death ==
Following his retirement in 2007, Bishop Emeritus Odongo settled in the city of Mbale. For the two weeks before his death, he was hospitalised at St. Francis Hospital Nsambya. He died there on the morning of 4 December 2020.

== See also ==
- Roman Catholicism in Uganda
- Uganda Martyrs

== Succession table as Archbishop of Military Ordinariate of Uganda ==
| Preceded by Cipriano Biyehima Kihangire (1964 -1985) | Bishop of Military Ordinariate of Uganda; 1985–2020 | Succeeded by vacant |
