= John Reesinck =

Dutch Catholic prelate

The Most Reverend John Reesinck
- Vicar Apostolic of Upper Nile District
- Diocese: Roman Catholic Archdiocese of Tororo
- Appointed: 29 March 1938
- Term ended: 1 March 1951
- Other post: Titular Archbishop of Thinis

Orders
- Ordination: 19 September 1908
- Consecration: 1 May 1938 by Arthur Hinsley

Personal details
- Born: John Reesinck; 22 February 1881 Delft, Netherlands
- Died: 7 November 1963 (aged 82)
- Denomination: Roman Catholic Church

Archbishop John Reesinck (22 February 1881–07 November 1953), was a Dutch Roman Catholic bishop, belonging to the order of the Mill Hill Missionaries. He served as Vicar Apostolic of Upper Nile District of the Roman Catholic Archdiocese of Tororo, from 1938, until his resignation in March 1951.

== Background and education ==
Reesinck was born on 22 February 1881 in Delft, Netherlands. He was ordained Priest on 19 September 1908 for the Mill Hill Missionaries.

== As bishop ==
He was appointed Vicar Apostolic of Upper Nile District of the Roman Catholic Archdiocese of Tororo, on 29 March 1938. He was appointed, the same day as bishop. On 1 May 1938, he was consecrated, in London, United Kingdom, taking the title of Titular Archbishop of Thinis. He served in that role until his resignation in March 1951.

His principal consecrator was Cardinal Arthur Hinsley, Archbishop of Westminster, England, assisted by Bishop Arthur Henry Doubleday, Bishop of Brentwood, England and Bishop Edward Myers, Titular Bishop of Lamus.

== In retirement ==
Bishop Reesinck died on 7 November 1963 at the age of 82, as Vicar Apostolic Emeritus of Upper Nile, Uganda.

== Other considerations ==
As a tribute to the bishop, some Catholic-founded schools have dormitories named in honour of Bishop John Reesinck. In Uganda, schools such as St. Peter's College, Tororo, and Namilyango College, have dormitories (Reesinck House) that are named after Bishop John Reesinck.
