= Wanda Błeńska =

Polish leprosy expert, AK officer and missionary

Servant of God Wanda Błeńska
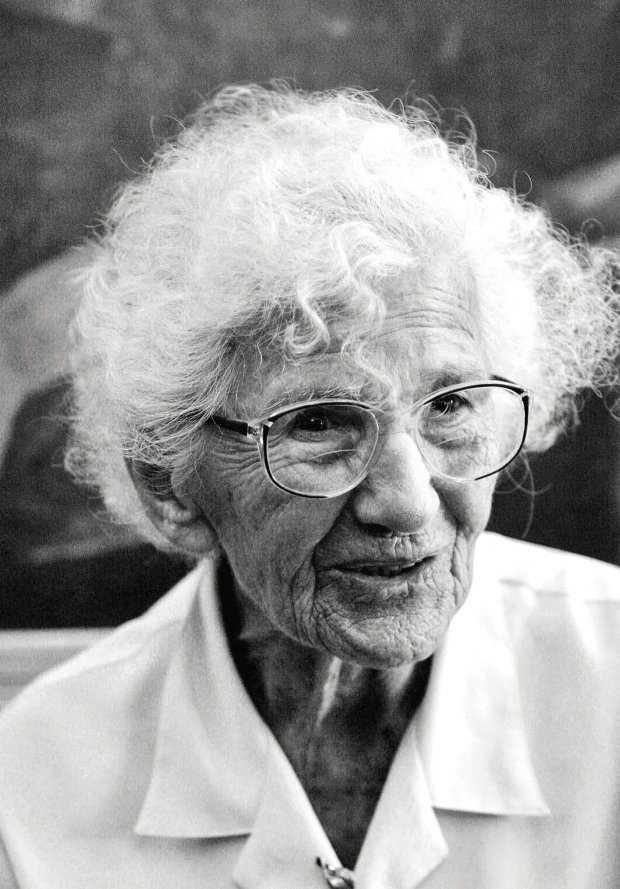
- Born: 30 October 1911; Poznań, Poland
- Died: 27 November 2014 (aged 103); Poznań, Poland

Wanda Błeńska, also spelled Wanda Blenska (30 October 1911 – 27 November 2014), was a Polish leprosy expert, AK officer, and a Catholic lay missionary who succeeded to develop the Buluba Hospital in Uganda into an internationally recognized centre for leprosy treatment.

== Biography ==
Błeńska was born in Poznań and graduated from the Female High School in Toruń and from the Faculty of Medicine at the University of Poznań in 1934. From 1934 to 1936 she worked at the City Hospital in Toruń, then in 1939 at the Marine Hospital in Gdynia. During the war she was a second lieutenant in Armia Krajowa (Home Army), a member of the Pomeranian Griffin, commander of the women's branch circuit of the Home Army in Toruń. After the IIWW, she led the municipal hospital in Toruń. From 1945 to 1946 she worked at the Medical University of Gdańsk. In 1946, she moved to Hannover. She finished courses of tropical medicine in Hannover, and in 1948 postgraduate studies at the Institute of Tropical Medicine and Hygiene at the University of Liverpool.

From 1951 to 1994, she worked in a leprosy treatment centre in the village of Buluba, near Lake Victoria in Uganda, where, until 1983, she was the physician-in-chief. Initially, a small facility run by the Irish Franciscans, the centre grew into a modern therapeutic and training center with a 100-bed hospital and a children's branch, diagnostic facilities, homes for lepers and the church, now known as Buluba Hospital. In addition to training for physicians, Dr. Błeńska initiated and organized courses for lepers' caregivers (Leprosy Assistants Training Courses). In Buluba, Dr. Błeńska worked with other Polish doctors: Bohdan Kozłowski, Wanda Marczak-Malczewska, Elżbieta Kołakowska, Dr. Henryk Nowak. Her long-term work gave her the nickname "Mother of Lepers".

In 1955, Błeńska became the first woman to summit Vittorio Emanuele in the Ruwenzori. In 1993, she returned to Poland and settled in Poznań.

In 2011, she was awarded with Order of Polonia Restituta by the President of Poland, Bronisław Komorowski.

== Beatification process ==
In February 2020, the Roman Catholic Archdiocese of Poznań initiated the first steps for her beatification process.
