= Vincent Billington =

English priest

Vincent Billington, MHM
- Bishop Emeritus of Jinja
- Church: Roman Catholic Diocese of Jinja
- Archdiocese: Roman Catholic Archdiocese of Kampala
- See: Roman Catholic Archdiocese of Kampala
- Appointed: 13 May 1948
- Term ended: 3 May 1965
- Predecessor: None
- Successor: Joseph Bernard Louis Willigers

Orders
- Ordination: 20 July 1930
- Consecration: 26 July 1948 by William Godfrey
- Rank: Bishop

Personal details
- Born: Vincent Billington; May 14, 1904; Blackburn, Lancashire, United Kingdom
- Died: 6 October 1976 (aged 72)

Vincent Billington, MHM (14 May 1904 - 6 October 1976), was an English Roman Catholic priest who served as Bishop of the Roman Catholic Diocese of Jinja, in Uganda, from 13 May 1948 until 3 May 1965.

== Background and priesthood ==
Billington was born on 14 May 1904, in the town of Blackburn, Lancashire, in the Roman Catholic Diocese of Salford, in the United Kingdom.

He was ordained priest on 20 July 1930, taking the vows of the Saint Joseph's Missionary Society of Mill Hill (Mill Hill Fathers). He served in that capacity until 13 May 1948.

== As bishop ==
He was appointed bishop on 13 May 1948 by Pope Pius XII and was consecrated as Vicar Apostolic of Kampala, Uganda and Titular Bishop of Avissa on 26 July 1948 by Archbishop William Godfrey†, Titular Archbishop of Cius, assisted by Bishop Thomas Edward Flynn†, Bishop of Lancaster, England, and Bishop Frederick Hall†, Titular Bishop of Alba Maritima.

In 1953, when the Vicariate Apostolic of Kampala was elevated to the Diocese of Kampala, Bishop Billington was appointed the new Bishop of the Diocese of Kampala on 25 March 1953. On 3 May 1965, he resigned as Bishop of Kampala and was appointed that same day as Titular Bishop of Fallaba. He resigned from there on 7 December 1970.

In 1953, the Diocese of Kampala was renamed the Roman Catholic Diocese of Jinja. Bishop Billington died on 6 October 1976, as Bishop Emeritus of Kampala Diocese (now Diocese of Jinja), at the age of 72 years and 3 months.

== Succession table at Jinja ==
Preceded by None (Before 1948)	Bishop of Jinja; 1948 - 1965	Succeeded by Joseph Bernard Louis Willigers (1967 - 2010)
