= Emmanuel Obbo =

Ugandan priest

The Most Reverend Emmanuel Obbo AJ
- Archbishop of Tororo
- Church: Roman Catholic Church
- Archdiocese: Tororo
- Predecessor: Denis Kiwanuka Lote
- Successor: Incumbent

Orders
- Ordination: 13 December 1986
- Consecration: 6 October 2007 by Erasmus Desiderius Wandera
- Rank: Bishop

Personal details
- Born: Emmanuel Obbo; 7 October 1952 (age 74) Nagoke Village, Tororo District, Uganda
- Motto: "Domine doce nos orare et consummare in unum" (Lord, teach us to pray, and to be perfected in unity)

Emmanuel Obbo, AJ (born 7 October 1952), is a Ugandan Catholic prelate who has served as Archbishop of Tororo since 2 January 2014. He previously served as Bishop of Soroti from 2007 to 2014. He is a member of the Apostles of Jesus missionary order.

== Background and priesthood ==
Obbo was born on 7 October 1952 in Nagoke Village, Kirewa Sub-county, in present-day Tororo District, in the Eastern Region of Uganda. His parents were Pius Othieno and Pauline Awor. He was ordained a priest on 13 December 1986. He served as priest in the Archdiocese of Tororo until 27 June 2007.

== Education ==
Obbo holds a PhD in Philosophy from Urbaniana Pontifical University, Rome.

== As bishop ==
He was appointed Bishop of Soroti on 27 June 2007 and was consecrated a bishop at Soroti on 6 October 2007 by Bishop Erasmus Desiderius Wandera, Bishop Emeritus of Soroti, assisted by Archbishop Denis Kiwanuka Lote, Archbishop of Tororo and Archbishop James Odongo, Auxiliary Bishop of Tororo.

On 2 January 2014, Obbo was appointed Archbishop of Tororo and concurrently appointed Apostolic Administrator of Soroti. He was installed as Archbishop on 1 March 2014. As of October 2025, he is the Archbishop of Tororo and concurrent Apostolic Administrator of Jinja.

== Succession table at Tororo ==
Preceded by Denis Kiwanuka Lote (2007 - 2014)	Archbishop of Tororo; 2014 - present	Succeeded by Incumbent

== See also ==
- Joseph Oliach Eciru
- Martin Luluga
