= Adrian Kivumbi Ddungu =

Ugandan Catholic bishop (1923–2009)

- Bishop Emeritus of Masaka
- Church: Roman Catholic Church
- Archdiocese: Roman Catholic Archdiocese of Kampala
- Appointed: 11 November 1961
- Term ended: 10 January 1998
- Predecessor: Joseph Nakabaale Kiwanuka
- Successor: John Baptist Kaggwa

Orders
- Ordination: 20 December 1952
- Consecration: 18 March 1962 by Joseph Nakabaale Kiwanuka
- Rank: Bishop

Personal details
- Born: Adrian Kivumbi Ddungu; 15 July 1923 Ssango Village, Rakai District, Uganda
- Died: 30 December 2009 (aged 86)

Adrian Kivumbi Ddungu (15 July 1923 – 30 December 2009) was a Ugandan Catholic priest who served as the second bishop of the Diocese of Masaka, in Uganda, from 11 November 1961 until 10 January 1998.

== Background and priesthood ==
He was born on 15 July 1923 to Petero Lugwana and Bulandina Nnakabugo Basanyukira, at Ssango Village, in present-day Rakai District.

He attended Nkoni Primary School, located at Nkoni, approximately 12 kilometres (7 mi) along the Masaka–Mbarara Road. Between 1939 and 1946, Ddungu studied at Bukalasa Minor Seminary "where he excelled". He was admitted to Katigondo Major Seminary in 1946 but studied there for only 10 months before he left for further studies in Rome, Italy. Ddungu was ordained to the priesthood on 20 December 1952, serving as a priest of Masaka, until 11 November 1961.

== As Bishop ==
He was appointed bishop by Pope John XXIII on 11 November 1961, and was consecrated as Bishop of Masaka on 18 March 1962, by Archbishop Joseph Nakabaale Kiwánuka†, Archbishop of Rubaga, assisted by Bishop Vincent Billington, Bishop of Kampala and Bishop Vincent Joseph McCauley, Bishop of Fort Portal. Ddungu retired as Bishop of Masaka on 10 January 1998.

In October 2009, Bishop Ddungu suffered a major stroke and was admitted to St. Francis Hospital Nsambya, in Kampala, Uganda's capital city. While at the hospital, his health deteriorated and he died on 30 December 2009, at the age of 86 years and 5 months.

== Succession table ==
Preceded by Joseph Nakabaale Kiwanuka (1939–1960)	Bishop of Masaka; 1961–1998	Succeeded by John Baptist Kaggwa (1998–2019)
