= Kalungu, Uganda =

Kalungu
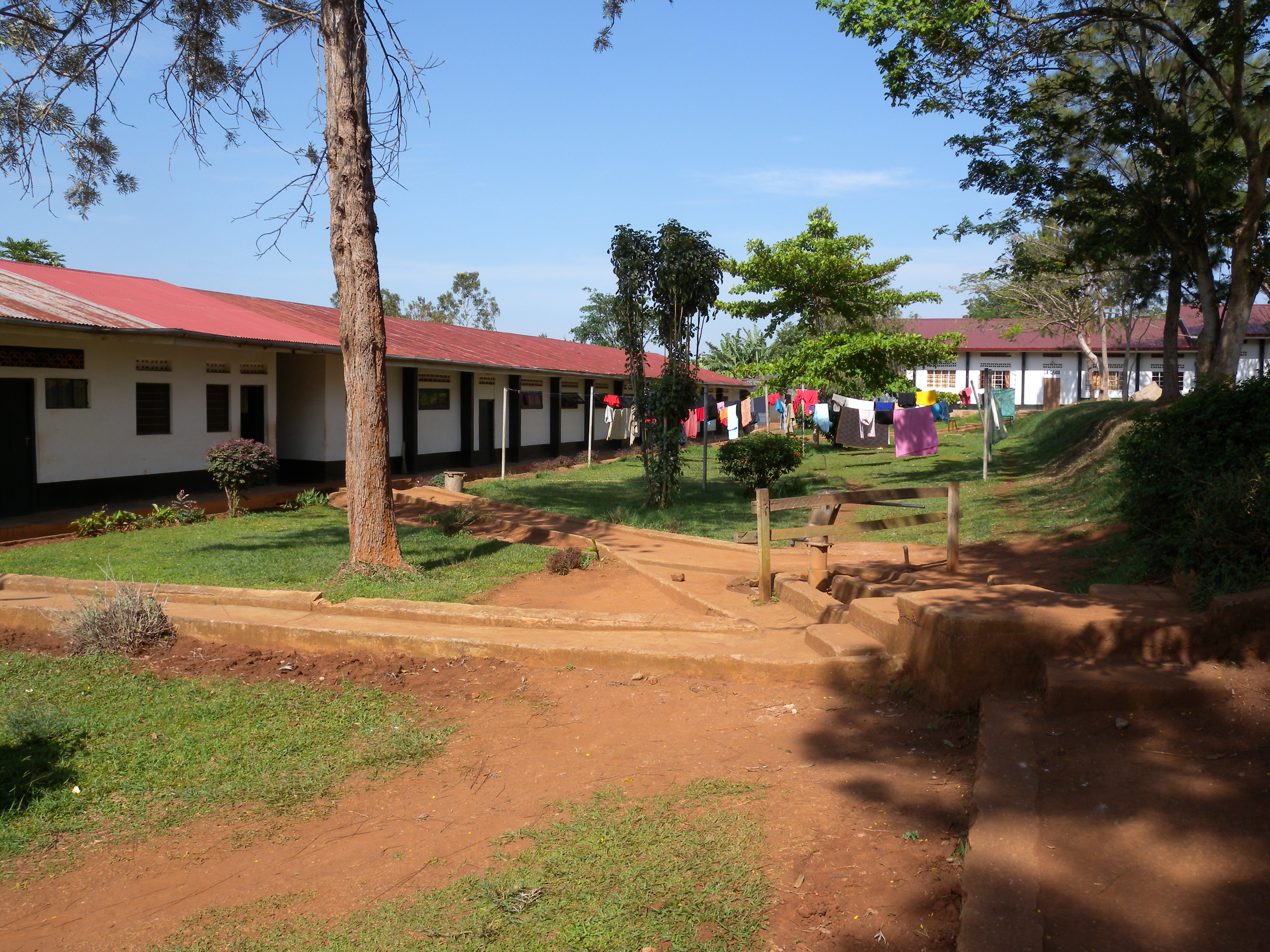
- School in Kalungu

- Map of Uganda showing the location of Kalungu.
- Coordinates: 00°10′05″S 31°45′36″E
- Country: Uganda
- Region: Central Uganda
- District: Kalungu District

Government
- Elevation: 1,300 m (4,300 ft)
- Time zone: UTC+3 (EAT)

Kalungu is a town in the Central Region of Uganda. It is the chief municipal, administrative, and commercial center in Kalungu District.

== Location ==
Kalungu is approximately 21 kilometres (13 mi), by road, northeast of Masaka, the largest metropolitan center in the sub-region. This is approximately 130 kilometres (81 mi), by road, southwest of Kampala, the capital of Uganda and its largest city. The coordinates of the town are 00 10 05S, 31 45 36E (Latitude:-0.1680; Longitude:31.7600).

== Landmarks ==
The landmarks within or close to the town include:

- offices of Kalungu Town Council
- headquarters of Kalungu District Administration
- Kalungu central market

== See also ==
- Lake Victoria
- Katonga River
- Hospitals in Uganda
