= Diocese of Fort Portal =

Diocese of the Catholic Church in Uganda

Coordinates: 0.6366°N 30.2684°E

Diocese of Fort Portal Dioecesis Arcis Portal
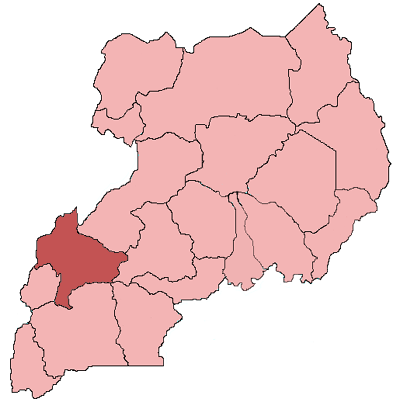
- Diocese of Fort Portal

Location
- Country: Uganda
- Metropolitan: Mbarara

Statistics
- Area: 9,553 km^{2} (3,688 sq mi)
- Population: Total; Catholics: (as of 2016); 2,537,415; 1,016,861 (40.1%)

Information
- Denomination: Roman Catholic
- Rite: Latin Rite

Current leadership
- Pope: Leo XIV
- Bishop: Robert Muhiirwa
- Auxiliary Bishops: Joseph Mugenyi Sabiiti

The Roman Catholic Diocese of Fort Portal (Latin: Arcis Portal) is a diocese located in the city of Fort Portal in the ecclesiastical province of Mbarara in Uganda.

The Catholic Diocese of Fort Portal formerly belonging to Rwenzori Vicariate was erected on 2 July 1961, with Vincent Joseph McCauley† CSC, as its first bishop. He was succeeded in 1972 by Serapio Bwemi Magambo† who served the Diocese until 1991, when Paul Lokiru Kalanda† took over as the third Bishop of the Diocese. His successor, the current bishop, Robert Muhiirwa, was ordained and installed on 15 June 2003.

== Bishops ==
This is a list of Bishops of Fort Portal (Roman rite)

- Vincent J. McCauley, C.S.C. (21 February 1961 – 16 November 1972)
- Serapio Bwemi Magambo (16 November 1972 – 17 June 1991)
- Paul Lokiru Kalanda (17 June 1991 – 18 March 2003)
- Robert Muhiirwa (since 18 March 2003)

=== Auxiliary Bishops ===
- Joseph Mugenyi Sabiiti (1999-)
- Serapio Bwemi Magambo (1969-1972), appointed Bishop here

=== Another priest of this diocese who became bishop ===
- Francis Aquirinus Kibira, appointed Bishop of Kasese in 2014
