= Roman Catholic Diocese of Soroti =

Diocese in Soroti, Tororo in Uganda

Coordinates: 1.7064°N 33.6119°E

Diocese of Soroti Dioecesis Sorotiensis
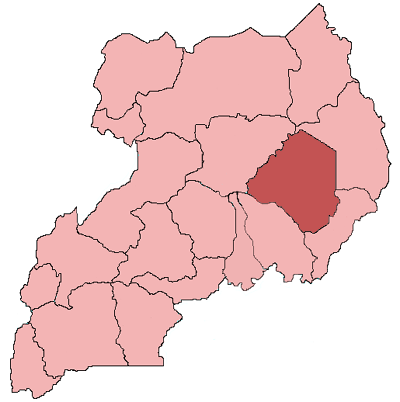
- Diocese of Soroti

Location
- Country: Uganda
- Metropolitan: Roman Catholic Archdiocese of Tororo

Statistics
- Area: 12,920 km^{2} (4,990 sq mi)
- Population: Total; Catholics: (as of 2004); 1,373,000; 887,000 (64.6%)

Information
- Sui iuris church: Latin Church
- Rite: Roman Rite

Current leadership
- Pope: Leo XIV
- Bishop: Joseph Oliach Eciru

The Roman Catholic Diocese of Soroti (Latin: Sorotien(sis)) is a diocese located in the city of Soroti in the ecclesiastical province of Tororo in Uganda.

== History ==
The current bishop of Soroti Catholic Diocese is Right Reverend Joseph Eciru Oliach, who was consecrated on 25 May 2019. The Vicar General is Monsignor Robert Echogu. Vicar for the Clergy is Msgr. Silver Opio, who also doubles as the diocesan development coordinator. Vicar for the Religious is Monsignor John Eriau. The Chancellor of the diocese is Father Gonzaga Ongereny Wazi Wazi, assisted by Father Samuel Okiria, who at the same time is Bishop's private Secretary as well as assistant to Father Frederick Obore in the Vocations office.

1.1 The local Community of Teso and their primordial encounter with Christianity

Father Christopher Kirk was the first Mill Hill Father to visit Teso in 1903 after being told about Ngora on one of his pastoral journeys among the Bakedi, from Budaka to 'Ngola' (Ngora). However he was advised by the chiefs against going as far as beyond the prescribed boundaries because of some anticipated unfriendliness. He therefore did not stay for long in Ngora but entrusted all that he had started into the hands of a catechist (Xavier F., Okello, The beginnings of Evangelization in Eastern Uganda-1895-1924: An Effort undertaken by the Mill Hill Missionaries of St Joseph Society, London- The Mill Hill Missionaries, doctoral dissertation, Roma 2007, p. 152-153).

"These people, Father Kirk found to have built their villages in the form of a circle, surrounded by trees. The huts were all cone-shaped and inside them was simply the bare earthen floor, 'no native beds, no native mats, no dried grass spread out on the earthen floor. The people were friendly and Father Kirk was helped by a Musoga boy who knew their language. They said they knew nothing of praying, thus Father Kirk was merely wasting time according to them. He however got some people together and tried to tell them a little about their Creator" (Cf., Okello,).

1.2. Laying of the strong foundation for Catholicism in Teso

'When Bishop Hanlon with Father Kirk visited Ngora in 1909, they met the catechist but no catechumen. They found very few people although they were aware of bishop's visit. And according to the African historian Robert O’Neil, there were also "millions of mosquitoes" (Robert O’Neil, Mission to the Upper Nile, Mission Book Service: London 1999, p. 85). Bishop Hanlon told Father Kirk to work up Ngora catechumenate with a good catechist but look for another site. He could not yet send a permanent priest to such a place.

The following passage is worth quoting directly; "Fr. Kirk had established a catechumenate at Ngora in 1908 which remained only a temporary site until 1912 with Dunne in charge and Father Morris as assistant. No permanent buildings had been erected and Fr. Mathews on visiting the site found two priests 'living there in the most primitive wattle and daub construction you can imagine'. It was decided to transfer them to Budaka and let two more experienced men, Father Kirk and Father Drontman takeover for a time. Sometime later Father Kiggen who was assistant at Budini was sent to Ngora to get the foundation going. He arrived there on 12 March 1912, and showed great enterprise encouraging the use of plough among the Teso, teaching them to use the yoke and was the first to undertake the burning of bricks" (Tom Tuma, Phares Mutibwa, A Century of Christianity in Uganda; 1877-1975: Nairobi, Uzima Ltd.,1978, p. 54). Fr. Kiggen has remained engraved in the minds of the Iteso. He is remembered for introducing the plough and burning of bricks to Teso and he wrote the first dictionary of Ateso. There is a secondary school which has even been erected in his honor; Fr. John Kiggen Memorial School. The School is well known for good upbringing, discipline and sports especially volleyball. The school has been nurtured by Fr Lawrence Larry Akepa every enthusiastic and 'no-nonsense' priest, formally Rector of St Peter's Minor Seminary Madera.

Ngora Mission was officially opened in 1912 by Father John Kiggen. With Kiggen's appointment it became an independent mission. During 1917 Kiggen built a double storied burnt-brick house of eight rooms with a tiled roof, all done with money he had begged from home. "Ngora is a very unhealthy station: and our hope is that this fine new dwelling house will improve the health of the Fathers" (Cf., O’Neil, p. 84).

"Ngora Parish steadily grew up to a large parish with many outstations and a very good tradition of calling the priest for both sacrament of the sick and burials" (O’Neil, p. 262-263). Later in 1940s, Edel Quine would start the first presidium of Legion of Mary in Ngora. Father Jurgens became involved in Legion work as spiritual director until the end of 1965.

1.3. Spreading of the Mission to other areas of the Teso region

Ngora Mission now having been fully established became the centre of reference for the Mill Hill Fathers as they moved to the neighboring districts.

Madera-Soroti

Saint Patrick Mission Madera was opened by Father John Dunne in 1914 near Soroti town along the Karamoja road. O’Neil tells us that 'there had been a famine in the country the previous year. Grass was cleared on the hill and a grass hut was built' (O’Neil, p. 85).

"At the time Madera was opened, the district around Ngora, Kumi and Soroti was known by the British Administration and missionaries as Bukedi, and the language was called Lukedi. As far as they knew, there was a different people called the Iteso who lived to the north of the Komulo swamp although they had no real presence there" (Ibid.)

'After John Kruyer's arrival at Ngora in 1914 Dunne who was still operating at Madera from Ngora could begin to use Soroti as a centre, moving out from there on safari. He had catechists at Kaikai, Wera, Orungo, and "empty churches" at Chodu, Kormora, Omulya and Kamoda. He wrote to Mathews from Tiriri in July that he planned to go the following week to Kalaki and Lwala and "round the Kumam district". Once food, sweet potatoes, was ready, Dunne and Kruyer were planning to move to Soroti' (Cf., O’Neil, p. 85).

To paraphrase O’Neil, Kiggen had harsh comments about Dunne, who was in charge of the Soroti and Lwala missions. Kiggen described Dunne as "pig-headed". He was very zealous to promote the work of the mission but his strong point is more the spiritual than the material. Dunne was insisting on a Lwala safari despite Kiggen's instructions that he stay at Soroti. But Kiggen did not want to interfere with Dunne who was superior of both Soroti and Lwala. Lwala Mission was opened by James Minderop in 1915 (O’Neil. p. 85).

Father Hugo Verkaaik has to be made mention of in relation to Madera the second parish to be opened in the diocese because of making it what it is now. It is a complex with many schools for he built "schools together with some teachers' houses precisely in the places where a school was needed" (O’Neil, p. 263). When one visits Madera parish now one will notice the surrounding of numerous schools: St. Kizito Technical Institute Madera, Madera Girls Primary School, Madera boys Primary School, St. Mary’s Girls' Secondary School Madera, and the Seminary plus now two wings of the St Francis School for the blind which came later.

"Madera had a large church well built, but still with a clay floor, which every week had to worked with thinned cow dung. This kept out the ants. Slowly but surely a cement floor was laid in the church and then very soon furnished with benches, just seats and kneelers" (O’Neil, p. 264). People simply sat on the floor before benches were brought.

"At baptism time, Jurgens recalled that Madera had large groups of Catechumens in preparation, many in Teso, but also numbers in Kumam. Many Kumam did their best to speak Ateso but a few villages just refused. Many children received baptism on safari, and after Sunday mass on appointed safari Sunday. Tickets were issued to catechists who filled them and the priests just inspected and later went back to fill the details in the register" (O’Neil).

"For the year ending 1 September 1917 Bishop Biermans reported an increase of baptisms by 172. There were forty-four catechumenates and 122 catechists. He was disappointed that the two Teso missionsat Ngora and Soroti were not doing well, with the number of catechumens falling considerably, he wrote that the stations were young yet, and it often takes two years before such people are in real earnest about instruction" (O’Neil, p. 86).

The reason why many catechumens were falling off could best be explained by the harshness of the methods employed by the catechists. The late Father John Eneku who was baptized at Soroti in 1923 later confessed that he shifted from Ngora to Soroti because the "catechists used to beat us a lot". However, on his very first attendance at Soroti he was welcomed by a beating: the catechist "gave him a good knock on the head saying, 'you should not be absent so often, I have not seen you for a long time" (Okello).

In relation to the above, when I talked to one of the elders in my parish an old man called 'Ateka' who received baptism from Ngora, he confessed that some of the catechumens who could not bear being beaten usually left. He said that some of the missionaries were also very rough. He told me a story of how a certain woman left because she was beaten for insisting on a 'wrong answer'; when asked "who created you", her answer was that it was her parents, and she never changed her position despite threats.

1.4. Soroti as a Diocese

It was on '29 March that the Diocese of Soroti was separated from the Diocese of Tororo and Erasmus Wandera was appointed the first bishop. The general council at Mill Hill considered the new diocese to be in serious need of help because of the shortage of priests. Therefore, a number of newly ordained were to be sent to reinforce the team of the diocesan priests' (Cf., O’Neil, p. 319).

"Bishop Erasmus Wandera was born at Dabani, in Tororo Diocese, on 16 April 1930, and was baptized by Father Henry Roemele. He was ordained on 27 December 1956 and appointed to be the first bishop of Soroti on 29 November 1980. He was ordained bishop on 29 March 1981" (O’Neil, p. 319). The population of the Catholics of Soroti Catholic Diocese by 2004 was rated at 887,000, that is, 64.6% out of 1,373,000.

The following information was taken from the New Vision of 4 October 2007, indicating the ordination of a Bishop to replace Bishop Erasmus Wandera, the first Bishop of the diocese:

The new Bishop of the Soroti Catholic Diocese, Emmanuel Obbo, A.J., will be consecrated and installed tomorrow to replace Bishop Erasmus Wandera, who has retired. The ceremony is to take place at Immaculate Conception Cathedral. Over 300,000 people, including 30 Bishops from Kenya and Uganda, are expected to attend. President Yoweri Museveni is expected to be the chief guest.

Conclusion

Other parishes were later opened which include St Pancras Toroma Katakwi district in 1932 by Father Theodore Schut, St Teresa Bukedea Kumi district by Father Henry Overwater in 1938, Our Lady's Parish Kidetok by Father Van de Ven in 1939, St Benedict Amuria by Father Raymond Griffin in 1941, St Paul Kumi by Father Thomas Hughes in 1949... Currently the Diocese has 41 active parishes and it has produced a little over 60 priests now including those who have died.

== Leadership ==
- Bishops of Soroti (Latin Church)
  - Bishop Erasmus Desiderius Wandera (29 November 1980 - 27 June 2007)
  - Bishop Emmanuel Obbo, A.J. (27 June 2007 – 2 January 2014), appointed Archbishop of Tororo
  - Bishop Joseph Oliach Eciru (since 19 March 2019)

== See also ==
- Catholic Church in Uganda
- Soroti
