= Diocese of Moroto =

Diocese of the Catholic Church in Uganda

Coordinates: 2.5236°N 34.6562°E

Diocese of Moroto Dioecesis Morotoënsis

Location
- Country: Uganda

Statistics
- Area: 14,857 km^{2} (5,736 sq mi)
- Population: Total; Catholics: 608,000; 363,050 (59.7%)
- Parishes: 11

Information
- Denomination: Catholicism
- Sui iuris church: Latin Church
- Rite: Roman
- Established: March 22, 1965
- Archdiocese: Tororo
- Secular priests: 12

Current leadership
- Pope: Leo XIV
- Bishop: Damiano Giulio Guzzetti, MCCJ

Map
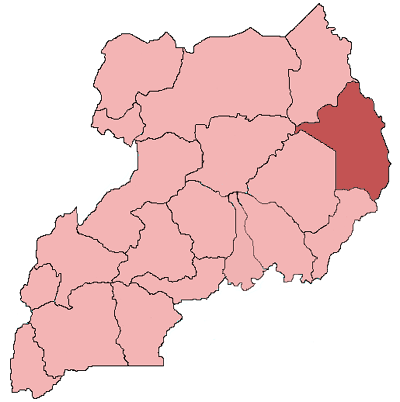
- Location of the Diocese of Moroto within Uganda

The Roman Catholic Diocese of Moroto (Latin: Morotoën(sis)) is a diocese in the ecclesiastical province of Tororo in Uganda.

== History ==
- March 22, 1965: Established as Diocese of Moroto from the Diocese of Gulu

== Leadership ==
- Bishops of Moroto (Latin Church)
  - Bishop Sisto Mazzoldi, M.C.C.I. (1967.06.12 – 1980)
  - Bishop Paul Lokiru Kalanda (1980.11.29 – 1991.06.17)
  - Bishop Henry Apaloryamam Ssentongo (1992 – 2014)
  - Bishop Damiano Giulio Guzzetti, M.C.C.I. (2014.05.24 - present)

== See also ==
- Roman Catholicism in Uganda
- Moroto

== Sources ==
- catholic-hierarchy
