= Diocese of Masaka =

Diocese of the Catholic Church in Uganda

Coordinates: 0.3313°S 31.7606°E

Diocese of Masaka Dioecesis Masakaensis
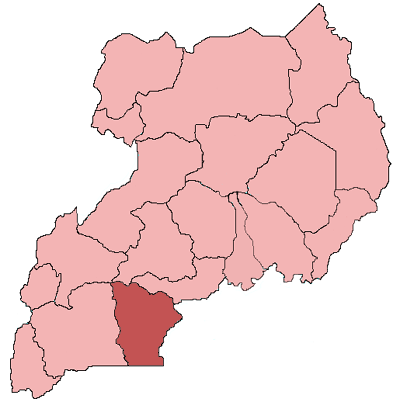
- Diocese of Masaka

Location
- Country: Uganda
- Metropolitan: Kampala

Statistics
- Area: 21,299 km^{2} (8,224 sq mi)
- Population: Total; Catholics: (as of 2004); 1,513,700; 908,220 (60.0%)

Information
- Rite: Latin Rite
- Cathedral: Our lady of sorrows kitovu cathedral

Current leadership
- Pope: Leo XIV
- Bishop: Serverus Jjumba

The Roman Catholic Diocese of Masaka (Latin: Masakaën(sis)) is a diocese located in the city of Masaka in the ecclesiastical province of Kampala in Uganda.

== History ==
=== Diocesan status ===
- March 25, 1953: Promoted as Diocese of Masaka
- May 25, 1939: Established as Apostolic Vicariate of Masaka from the Apostolic Vicariate of Uganda

== Bishops ==
- Vicar Apostolic of Masaka (Roman rite)
  - Bishop Joseph Kiwánuka, M. Afr. R.I.P. (1939.05.25 – 1953.03.25 see below)
- Bishops of Masaka (Roman rite)
  - Bishop Joseph Kiwánuka, M. Afr. R.I.P. (see above 1953.03.25 – 1960.12.20), appointed Archbishop of Rubaga
  - Bishop Adrian Kivumbi Ddungu R.I.P. (1961.11.11 – 1998.01.10)
  - Bishop John Baptist Kaggwa R.I.P. (1998.01.10 - 2019.04.16)
  - Bishop Serverus Jjumba (Episcopal ordination on 6 July 2019) Former appointments: Bukalasa Seminary, Diocesan Treasury, Vicar General and finally elected Bishop of Masaka Diocese and pronounced publicly by the Holy See on 16 April 2019 at 2pm (EAT).

Edited by Joseph Kasekende and Morris Kayanja, Theologians at National Seminary Ggaba-Uganda.

=== Coadjutor Bishop ===
- John Baptist Kaggwa (1994-1998)

=== Auxiliary Bishop ===
- Henry Apaloryamam Ssentongo (1988-1992), appointed Bishop of Moroto

=== Other priest of this diocese who became bishop ===
- Emmanuel Wamala, appointed Bishop of Kiyinda-Mityana in 1981; future Cardinal

== See also ==
- Roman Catholicism in Uganda
- Masaka

== Sources ==
- catholic-hierarchy
