= Vincent J. McCauley =

American Catholic bishop (1906–1982)

Servant of God Vincent Joseph McCauley
- Bishop Emeritus of Fort Portal
- Province: Mbarara
- Diocese: Fort Portal
- Installed: July 2, 1961
- Term ended: November 16, 1972
- Predecessor: Serapio Bwemi Magambo
- Successor: Robert Muhiirwa Akiiki

Orders
- Ordination: June 24, 1934
- Consecration: May 18, 1961 by Cardinal Richard James Cushing
- Rank: Bishop

Personal details
- Born: Vincent Joseph McAuley; March 8, 1906 Council Bluffs, Iowa, United States
- Died: November 1, 1982 (aged 76) Rochester, Minnesota United States
- Buried: Notre Dame, Indiana
- Denomination: Roman Catholic Church

Styles of Vincent Joseph McCauley
- Reference style: The Most Reverend
- Spoken style: Your Excellency
- Religious style: Bishop
- Posthumous style: Servant of God

Vincent Joseph McCauley, CSC (March 8, 1906 – November 1, 1982) was an American prelate of the Roman Catholic Church. A member of the Congregation of Holy Cross, he was the first Bishop of Fort Portal, having served as the ordinary of the diocese from 1961 to 1972. Later, he served as executive director of the Association of Member Episcopal Conferences in Eastern Africa from 1972 to 1979. A Servant of God, his cause for beatification was introduced in the Congregation for the Causes of Saints in August 2006.

== Early life ==
McCauley, the eldest of six children, was born in Council Bluffs, Iowa, to Charles McCauley and Mary Wickham. His father was a wire chief for American Telephone & Telegraph in Omaha, Nebraska, and his mother took care of the home. The family prayed the rosary daily. Active in St. Francis Xavier Parish in Council Bluffs, his father was a member of the Knights of Columbus, and his mother was active in the altar guild and various prayer circles. These groups later assisted McCauley during his missionary efforts during troubled periods of the Great Depression and World War II.

McCauley attended Creighton Preparatory School, where he excelled in sports, especially baseball, playing semi-professional baseball in Omaha to earn extra money. He graduated in 1924 and entered at Creighton University's College of Arts and Letters as part of the class of 1928, but in November 1924 left Council Bluffs to join the Congregation of Holy Cross.

== Formation in the Congregation of Holy Cross ==
July 1, 1925, McCauley entered the novitiate, professing first vows on July 2, 1926. He then professed perpetual vows on July 2, 1929, and graduated from the University of Notre Dame in June 1930. He then went to the Foreign Missionary Seminary in Washington, D.C. He was ordained a deacon on October 1, 1933. He was ordained a priest on June 24, 1934, by Bishop John F. Noll at the Basilica of the Sacred Heart, Notre Dame.

McCauley trained at the Foreign Mission Seminary to serve as an overseas missionary. After his 1934 ordination, the Congregation of Holy Cross, with the economic hardship of the Great Depression, had insufficient funds to send McCauley overseas. He became a member of the faculty at the congregation's seminary in North Dartmouth, Massachusetts, and the seminary's director of maintenance. He was responsible for its relocation to the estate of Frederick Lothrop Ames Jr. in Easton, Massachusetts in 1935. This estate became Stonehill College in 1948.

== Missionary to Bengal: 1936–1944 ==
A recovering economy allowed McCauley to be assigned to East Bengal, a territory that roughly corresponds to modern day Bangladesh. McCauley departed along with another Holy Cross priest and two Holy Cross brothers aboard the RMS Franconia (1922) on October 12, 1936. He arrived in Dhaka on November 16, 1936.

From 1936 to 1939 McCauley was assigned to Bandhura to work in education, teaching in Bandura Holy Cross High School and forming catechists. In 1939, McCauley was assigned to evangelize the Kuki people in the Mymensingh District. While there, he contracted malaria and spent several months of 1940 recuperating.

On October 1, 1940, he was appointed rector and superior of Little Flower Seminary in Bandhura. His health remained fragile, with frequent relapses of malaria and other tropical maladies.

In December 1943, while on a trip to Dhaka, a severe case of phlebitis caused a two-month hospitalization. Eventually, during World War II, Holy Cross persuaded the U.S. Army to provide medical evacuation for McCauley. He was flown back to the U.S. and began an extended period of recovery.

== Work in the United States: 1946–1958 ==
In June 1945, McCauley began as assistant superior of the Foreign Mission Seminary in Washington, D.C., where he had studied. In 1946, he was appointed superior and rector, a post he held for six years.

In 1952, he was appointed procurator for the missions. During this period he began treatment at the Mayo Clinic for skin cancer. As the chief fundraiser for Holy Cross Missions in Bengal, he bragged that he would log 80,000 miles annually to preach missions and raise funds.

== Mission to Africa: 1958–1961 ==
Along with Fr. Arnold Fell, CSC, McCauley was sent to Uganda on a fact-finding mission. They were sent to recommend if the Congregation of Holy Cross should assume responsibility for a mission in Uganda within the kingdoms of Bunyoro and Toro. McCauley supported the proposal; superiors in the order agreed, and plans were drawn up to send a group of religious to serve in Uganda.

Despite concerns about his health, McCauley was selected to lead the mission, along with three newly ordained Holy Cross priests: Francis Zagorc, Robert Hesse, and Burton Smith, although they had been selected for service in Bangladesh and had already sent their trunks there.

The Holy Cross religious arrived in Entebbe International Airport on November 4, 1958. Holy Cross served in the northern portion of the diocese, in and around Fort Portal. After three years to become established, Holy Cross and McCauley created the Roman Catholic Diocese of Fort Portal.

== Episcopal career: 1961–1972 ==
After setting up the Holy Cross mission in Uganda, Vincent McCauley was appointed as the first bishop of Fort Portal. He was consecrated a bishop at the Basilica of the Sacred Heart at Notre Dame in May 1961, and installed as bishop of Fort Portal two months later. Uganda, a protectorate of Britain]], gained its independence in 1962, followed by violent conflicts, which affected the mission. McCauley's policy was to adapt Christian teachings and practices to cultures (iinculturation and to promote the local church and local clergy.

McCauley attended all four sessions of the Second Vatican Council, which influenced his attitudes. In the mid-1960s, McCauley was an advocate for refugees from Rwanda, the Congo, and the Sudan. He had to overcome conflict among the tribes of his diocese. McCauley also led and supported the development of religious congregations of women, and promoted their movement into new areas of ministry. He was also involved in education. During his tenure he suffered from repeated problems with skin cancer, malaria, and other ailments.

== AMECEA: 1964–1979 ==
In 1964, during the Second Vatican Council, McCauley became chairman of the Association of Member Episcopal Conferences in Eastern Africa (AMECEA). He guided the association through its first three triennial plenary meetings, and arranged the basic organization of AMECEA and its departments. He also established the Gaba Pastoral Institute for the formation of catechists. When his chairmanship ended in 1973, he replaced Flynn as secretary-general. McCauley, in assuming the new responsibility, moved from Fort Portal to Nairobi.

== Death ==
Bishop McCauley suffered from facial skin cancer for much of his adult life. In all, he had more than fifty surgeries. As he grew older, additional health concerns emerged. In September 1976, a plastic aorta was inserted into his heart at the Mayo Clinic. Beginning in July 1982, he began to suffer acute pulmonary hemorrhages. In October 1982, he returned to the U.S. for treatment. McCauley died while undergoing risky exploratory surgery on November 1, 1982, and was buried in the Holy Cross community cemetery at Notre Dame on November 4.

In August 2006, the cause for canonization of Bishop McCauley, CSC was introduced in the Congregation of Saints. As "Servant of God" Bishop McCauley's case was continuing to be reviewed as of 2022.

== See also ==
- Association of Member Episcopal Conferences in Eastern Africa
- Roman Catholic Diocese of Fort Portal
