= Kalungu District =

- District
- District location in Uganda
- Coordinates: 00°06′S 31°49′E
- Country: Uganda
- Region: Central Uganda
- Capital: Kalungu

Area
  - Land: 811.6 km^{2} (313.4 sq mi)

Population (2012 Estimate)
  - Total: 177,200
  - Density: 218.3/km^{2} (565/sq mi)
- Time zone: UTC+3 (EAT)
- Website: www.kalungu.go.ug

Kalungu District is a district in Central Uganda. It is named after the main town of the district, Kalungu, where the district headquarters are located.

== Location ==
Kalungu District is bordered by Gomba District to the north, Butambala District to the north-east, Mpigi District to the east, Masaka District to the south, and Bukomansimbi District to the west. The district headquarters, Kalungu, are 21 kilometres (13 mi), by road, north-east of the city of Masaka, the largest metropolitan area in the sub-region.

== Overview ==
Kalungu District was created by an Act of Parliament, carved from Masaka District. The district began functioning on 1 July 2010.

== Population ==
In 1991, the national census estimated the district population at 152,030. The 2002 national census put the population at approximately 160,700. As of July 2012, the population was estimated at 177,200.

== See also ==
- Districts of Uganda
- Mpigi District
- Mukono District
