= Archdiocese of Tororo =

Catholic archdiocese in Uganda

Coordinates: 0.7069°N 34.1998°E

Archdiocese of Tororo Archidioecesis Tororoensis

Location
- Country: Uganda
- Deaneries: 12

Statistics
- Area: 8,837 km^{2} (3,412 sq mi)
- Population: Total; Catholics: 4,120,065; 999,750 (24.3%)
- Parishes: 46

Information
- Denomination: Catholicism
- Sui iuris church: Latin Church
- Rite: Roman
- Established: July 13, 1894
- Cathedral: Uganda Martyrs’ Cathedral, Tororo
- Secular priests: 109
- Metropolitan Archbishop: Emmanuel Obbo, A.J.
- Suffragans: Jinja, Kotido, Moroto, Soroti
- Vicar General: Christopher Emuseet

Map
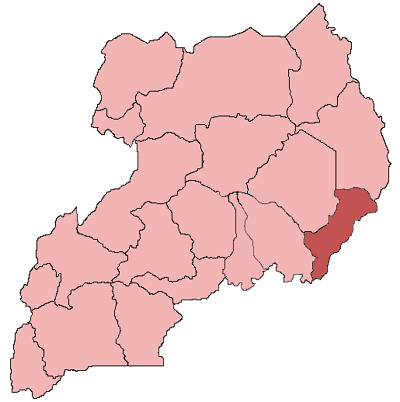
- Location of the archdiocese within Uganda

The Roman Catholic Archdiocese of Tororo (Latin: Tororoën(sis)) is the Metropolitan See for the ecclesiastical province of Tororo in Uganda.

On January 2, 2014, it was announced that the Bishop of Soroti, Uganda, Emmanuel Obbo, had been named by Pope Francis to be the new Archbishop of Tororo.

== History ==
- July 13, 1894: Established as the Apostolic Vicariate of Upper Nile from the Apostolic Vicariate of Victoria–Nyanza
- May 10, 1951: Renamed as Apostolic Vicariate of Tororo
- March 25, 1953: Promoted as Diocese of Tororo
- January 2, 1999: Promoted as Metropolitan Archdiocese of Tororo

== Special churches ==
The seat of the archbishop is the Uganda Martyrs’ Cathedral in Tororo.

== Leadership ==
- Metropolitan Archbishops of Tororo (Roman rite)
  - Archbishop Denis Kiwanuka Lote (September 22, 2007 - January 2, 2014)
  - Archbishop James Odongo (January 2, 1999 - September 22, 2007)
- Bishops of Tororo (Roman rite)
  - Archbishop James Odongo (August 19, 1968 – January 2, 1999)
  - Bishop John Francis Greif, M.H.M. (March 25, 1953 – August 17, 1968)
- Vicars Apostolic of Tororo (Roman rite)
  - Bishop John Francis Greif, M.H.M. (May 1, 1951 – March 25, 1953)
- Vicars Apostolic of Upper Nile (Roman rite)
  - Bishop John Reesinck, M.H.M. (March 29, 1938 – March 1951)
  - Bishop John William Campling, M.H.M. (May 13, 1925 – February 1938)
  - Bishop Johannes Biermans, M.H.M. (April 27, 1912 – 1924)
  - Bishop Henry Hanlon, M.H.M. (July 17, 1894 – November 17, 1911)

== Suffragan Dioceses ==
- Jinja
- Kotido
- Moroto
- Soroti

== See also ==
- Roman Catholicism in Uganda
- Tororo
