= Uganda Episcopal Conference =

Board of Roman Catholic bishops of Uganda

- Episcopal Conference of Uganda
- Location within Kampala
- Formation: January 1, 1960; 66 years ago
- Type: Nonprofit, NGO
- Location: Nsambya, Kampala, Uganda
- Coordinates: 0°18′01″N 32°35′18″E
- Region served: East Africa
- Chairman: Sanctus Lino Wanok
- Vice-Chairman: Lambert Bainomugisha
- General Secretary: John B. Kauta
- Affiliations: Catholic Church
- Website: https://www.uecon.org/

The Uganda Episcopal Conference (UEC) or Episcopal Conference of Uganda is the local conference of Roman Catholic bishops in Uganda, established in 1960.

The UEC acts primarily through the Uganda Catholic Secretariat in an effort to promote and coordinate social and pastoral ministry of the Catholic Church of Uganda. This task is performed through twelve committees including the liturgical-pastoral, dedicated to the apostolate of the laity, the Board of justice and peace, as education and training of priests, and those on ecumenism and interreligious dialogue. The statutes of the Conference were approved by the Holy See on September 8, 1974.

The UEC is a member of the Association of Member Episcopal Conferences in Eastern Africa (AMECEA) and Symposium of Episcopal Conferences of Africa and Madagascar (SECAM).

== Chairmen of the Bishops' Conference ==
1969–1975: Emmanuel Kiwanuka Nsubuga, Archbishop of Kampala

1975–1977: John Baptist Kakubi, Archbishop of Mbarara

1977–1982: Adrian Kivumbi Ddungu, Bishop of Masaka

1982–1986: Barnabas R. Halem 'Imana, Bishop of Kabale

1986–1994: Emmanuel Wamala, Bishop of Kiyinda–Mityana and later Archbishop of Kampala

1994–2002: Paul Lokiru Kalanda, Bishop of Fort Portal

2002–2006: Paul K. Bakyenga, Archbishop of Mbarara

2006–2010: Matthias Ssekamaanya, bishop of Lugazi

2010–2018: John Baptist Odama, Archbishop of Gulu

2018–2026: Joseph Anthony Zziwa, bishop of Kiyinda–Mityana.

2026 to date: Sanctus Lino Wanok, bishop of Lira

== See also ==
- Uganda Catholic Television
- Uganda Martyrs University
