= Bonaventure Bosco Gubazire =

Ugandan Roman Catholic prelate (born 1974)

The Most Reverend Bonaventure Bosco Gubazire M.Afr.
- Bishop of Kabale, Uganda
- Church: Catholic Church
- Archdiocese: Archdiocese of Mbarara
- See: Diocese of Kabale
- Appointed: 15 July 2026
- Installed: 3 October 2026 Expected
- Predecessor: Callistus Rubaramira (15 March 2003 – 15 July 2026)

Orders
- Ordination: 10 August 2003
- Consecration: 3 October 2026
- Rank: Bishop

Personal details
- Born: Bonaventure Bosco Gubazire; 3 March 1974 (age 52) Kitumba, Kabale District, Uganda
- Motto: In Caritate Evangelium Praedicare (To preach the Gospel in love)

Styles of Bonaventure Bosco Gubazire
- Reference style: Your Lordship; The Most Reverend
- Spoken style: His Lordship
- Religious style: Bishop

Bonaventure Bosco Gubazire M.Afr. (born 3 March 1974) is a Ugandan Roman Catholic prelate who was appointed Bishop of the Diocese of Kabale, in Uganda on 15 July 2026. Before that, from 10 August 2003 until 15 July 2026, he served as a priest of the Missionaries of Africa, a Catholic religious congregation, of which he is a professed member. He was appointed bishop by Pope Leo XIV and was consecrated bishop on 3 October 2026 at the Diocesan Cathedral at Rushoroza, Kabale, in Uganda.

== Background and education ==
Bonaventure Bosco Gubazire was born on 3 March 1974 at Kitumba, Diocese of Kabale, Kabale District, in Uganda. He attended Saint Paul's Minor Seminary in Rushoroza, Kabale Municipality. He then studied at the Philosophy Centre in Jinja, where he graduated with a Bachelor of Arts degree in philosophy and religious studies. He then studied at the Catholic University of Toulouse in France where he graduated with a Bachelor of Arts in theology.

During 2008, he studied at the Jesuit Spiritual Center Le Châtelard in Lyon, France, where he undertook a course in "formation of formators" and "spiritual accompaniment". From 2008 until 2010, he studuied at the Milltown Institute of Philosophy in Dublin, Ireland (today a component of the National University of Ireland), where he obtained a licentiate in philosophy. During 2014, he attended a course in biblical formation at Saint Anne's Formation Centre in Jerusalem. His Doctorate degree in philosophy was awarded by the University of San Carlos, in Cebu, Philippines where he studied from 2016 until 2020.

== Priest ==
While at seminary, he became a member of the White Fathers. He was ordained a priest of his religious order on 10 August 2003. He served as a priest until 15 July 2026. While a priest, he served in various roles and locations, including:

- Parish vicar of Nossa Senhora de Fatima in Murraça, Mozambique from 2003 until 2007.
- Director of the school for adult education in Murraça and Caia from 2004 until 2007.
- Member of the Council of the Section of the Missionaries of Africa in Mozambique from 2005 until 2007.
- Studies at the Jesuit Spiritual Centre Le Châtelard in Lyon, France attending a course in formation of formators and spiritual accompaniment in 2008.
- Studies at the Milltown Institute of Philosophy in Dublin, Ireland leading to the award of a licentiate in philosophy from 2008 until 2010.
- Professor and dean of studies at the Lechaptois Formation House in Balaka, Malawi from 2010 until 2013.
- Delegate for the Protection of Minors, Malawi Section from 2011 until 2016.
- Interim rector of the Lechaptois Formation House in Balaka, Malawi from 2013 until 2015.
- Attended a course in biblical formation at Saint Anne's Formation Centre in Jerusalem in 2014.
- Studies at the University of San Carlos in Cebu, Philippines, leading to the award of a doctorate degree in philosophy from 2016 until 2020.
- Coordinator and chaplain of the Friends of Missionaries of Africa in Cebu, Philippines from 2017 until 2020.
- Member of the Council of the Asia Section in Cebu, Philippines from 2017 until 2020.
- Rector of Our Lady of Africa Formation House Seminary in Cebu, Philippines from 2019 until 2020.
- Dean of studies at Spiritan University College in Ejisu, Ghana from 2021 until 2026.
- Rector of the house of philosophical formation of the Saint Martin of Tours Formation House in Ejisu from 2023 until 2026.
- Member of the Provincial Council of the Province of Ghana-Nigeria of the Missionaries of Africa from 2025 until 2026.

== Bishop ==
On 15 July 2026, Pope Leo XIV accepted the age-related resignation of Bishop Callistus Rubaramira from the pastoral care of the Catholic Diocese of Kabale in Uganda. On the same day, The Holy Father appointed Reverend Father Monsignor Bonaventure Bosco Gubazire, M. Afr., previously Rector of Saint Martin of Tours Formation House in Ejisu, Ghana to succeed at Kabale. He received his episcopal consecration at Kabale on 3 October 2026. The Principal Consecrator was Callistus Rubaramira, Bishop Emeritus of Kabale who was assisted by Tomasz Grysa, Titular Archbishop of Rubicon & Apostolic Nuncio to Uganda and Lambert Bainomugisha, Archbishop of Mbarara.

== See also ==
- Catholic Church in Uganda

== Succession table ==
Catholic Church titles
Preceded by Callistus Rubaramira (15 March 2003 – 15 July 2026)	Bishop of Kabale (since 15 July 2026)	Succeeded by (Incumbent)
