= Paolino Tomaino =

Italian Catholic priest who served in Uganda for more than 50 years

Reverend Father Paolino Tomaino
- A portrait of Paolino Tomaino at his funeral in Kyamuhunga Parish
- Church: Roman Catholic Church
- Archdiocese: Roman Catholic Archdiocese of Mbarara
- Metropolis: Bushenyi
- Other post: In charge of the Lay Apostolate Office in Rushoroza

Orders
- Ordination: 1964-06-28
- Rank: Reverend Father

Personal details
- Born: 4 November 1937 San Pietro Apostolo, Calabria, Italy
- Died: 3 March 2024 (aged 86) Milan, Italy
- Buried: 0° 27′ 32.32″ S, 30° 07′ 45.65″ E
- Denomination: Catholic
- Parents: Santo Tomaino and Rosa Tomaino
- Occupation: Catholic priest and a teacher
- Profession: Teacher, Missionary Priest

Paolino Tomaino (4 November 1937 - 3 March 2024) also known as Paulino Tomaino, Paul Tomaino, Paulino Tomaino MCCJ, Paolo Tomaino, was a Catholic priest who was affiliated with the Comboni Missionaries of the Heart of Jesus (aka Verona Fathers). He was the only Lametino missionary in Uganda for sixty years. He spent more than 50 years serving as a missionary in Uganda.

== Birth, ordination and missionary work ==
=== Early years ===
Paolino Tomaino was born on 4 November 1937 to Santo Tomaino and Rosa Tomaino in San Pietro Apostolo, South of Italy, in the Parish of St. Peter the Apostle, Lamezia Diocese in Italy.

He was the eldest child in his family of five and his siblings are; Giuseppe Tomaino, Maria Louisa Tomaino, Luisa Tomaino and Antonietta Tomaino.

While in the Kigezi, Fr. Paolino, was given a new name, Mutambirungu, which means "Comforter of the lonely".

Father Paolino obtained Ugandan citizenship and he held both a Ugandan Passport and also a Ugandan national identification card and this was confirmed by Chris Baryomunsi during a press conference at the Uganda media center.

=== Missionary work ===
He said his first vows in the congregation of the Comboni Missionaries of the Heart of Jesus on 9 September 1958, took perpetual vows on 9 September 1963, and was ordained a Priest on 28 June 1964 in the congregation of the Comboni Missionaries for the Heart of Jesus.

In January 1965, he was assigned to Uganda together with Fr. Sean Dempsey, Fr. Joseph Ambrose and Fr. Mario Cisternino.

In January 1965, Bishop Jean-Marie-Gaëtan Ogez (the Bishop of Mbarara by that time) sent Father Paolino to work in Rushoroza parish in Kabale which was under Mbarara diocese.

In May 1965, Father Paolino studied a Runyankore-Rukiga language course in Nyakishenyi and Mushanga with Fr. Fitz Patrick.

In April 1968, he was posted to start a new parish in Nyamwegabira which was under Makiro parish in Kanungu District together with Fr. Tanel and Br. Lucio Cariani.

Fr. Tomaino went back to Italy in 1970 and returned to Uganda. From January to October 1971, he worked in Buhara and then in Rwanyena with Fr. Joseph Ambrose and Fr. Wanyena.

In September 1973, Fr. Paolino was made to be in charge of the Lay Apostolate Office in Rushoroza in Kabale, after he was contacted by Bishop Barnabas R. Halem'Imana.

In 1975, Fr. Paolino organized a pilgrimage and took about 300 people to Rome for the Holy year.

In January 1976, Fr. Paolino was reassigned to Makiro Deanery in Kanungu District up to the end of 1980, and he handed over the office to Fr. Gaetano Batanyenda, then he went to Kambuga to open up a new parish, he was later joined by Fr. Pasquali, Fr. Franco, Fr. Cisternino, Fr. Zanoli and Fr. Carraro between 1981 and 1989.

In 1989, the Comboni missionaries ended their work in Kabale and Fr. Paolino left Kabale after celebrating his 25th Priesthood anniversary and went to Italy for a holiday.

In September 1990, Fr. Paolino was posted in Kyamuhunga in Mbarara Diocese which was under Bishop John Baptist Kakubi and the auxiliary Bishop Bakyenga. Fr. Paolino opened a new parish in Kyamuhunga Parish. He also served with Fr. Franco and Fr. Gino Tosello in Kyamuhunga Parish.

In 1999, he was assigned to Greater Nyabushozi (which constituted of Mbarara, Isingiro, Ibanda and Kiruhura) where the Catholic Church was not present. He also supported the development of 5 secondary schools and over 70 Primary Schools in Nyabushozi.

In September 2000, he served in Rushere Parish with Fr. Ambrose Ayebare.

In 2014, he was assigned back to Kyamuhunga Parish not for parish work, but because of health reasons. while in Kyamuhunga he helped in the construction of more classrooms for St. John Baptist Primary School Ntungamo.

In April 2015, Fr. Paolino served in Kyamuhunga Rwenjojo with Fr. Joseph Kibirige. Fr. Paolino went back to Italy in his home parish to celebrate his golden jubilee as a priest. On 10 October 2015, Fr. Paolino celebrated his 51st Anniversary of Priesthood at Bishop Comboni College Kambuga.

== Health, death and burial ==
On 27 December 2023, he was admitted in Platinum hospital in Kampala. He was also admitted in Limone medical center in Mbuya Kampala On 13 February 2024 when he was airlifted for further treatment in Italy. He died in Milan Hospital, Italy, on the 3 March 2024 due to heart failure.

On 6 March 2024, a requiem mass was held in the mother church of San Pietro Apostolo and the mass was celebrated by Monsignor Serafino Parisi (the bishop of the diocese of Lamezia Terme. A press conference was held on the Uganda media Centre by Chris Baryomunsi and he informed Ugandans that Fr. Paolino was to be buried in Kyamuhunga in Bushenyi.

The government of Uganda paid the costs for the specialized treatment and also for repatriation of Father Paolino's body from Italy and it arrived in Uganda on the 10 March 2024 and it was transported by the A-plus Funeral Management Limited from the time the body arrived at Entebbe Airport to the time his body was laid to rest in Kyamuhunga.

On 10 March 2024, a vigil Mass for Fr. Paolino Tomaino MCCJ was held at Our Lady of Africa Mbuya, the following day a requiem Mass for Fr. Paolino Tomaino was held at Our Lady of Africa in Mbuya at 9am. His body was transported to Rushere Catholic Parish for a vigil Mass at Rushere Catholic Church in Kiruhura District.

On 12 March 2024, Fr. Paolino's body was transported for a requiem mass at 10am in Kambuga Parish and after the mass his body was transported to Bishop Comboni college for a vigil mass. The next day his body was transported from Bishop Comboni college to Kyamuhunga Parish for a vigil mass.

On 14 March 2024, a requiem mass was held at 9am and it was led by Rev Fr. Archangel Ayebare. His body was laid to rest at Kyamuhunga Catholic Parish in Bushenyi District where he asked his body to be buried instead of following the Catholic church custom of burying the clergy at the headquarters of Mbarara Archdiocese in Nyamitanga.

The burial mass was led by the Archbishop of Mbarara, Lambert Bainomugisha as the main celebrant. The songs were sung by the Kyamuhunga Catholic parish choir. People and institutions that laid the wreaths on Fr. Paolino's coffin included;

- Lambert Binomugisha
- Thomas Tayebwa
- Raphael Magezi
- Chris Baryomunsi
- Members of Parliament of Uganda, including Mbwatekamwa Louis Gaffa, Annet Katusiime Mugisha, Jovanice Rwenduru
- Chairman Local Council Five who included; Jafari bassajabala (Bushenyi), Rev. Samuel Mugisha Katugunda (Kazo), Dan Mukago (Kihuhura),
- Fr. Archangel Barekye representing all parish priests of Mbarara Archdiocese
- Provincial superior Fr. Antony Kimbowa Kibira represented the Comboni missionaries of Africa
- Family of Fr. Paolino Tomaino
- Gilbert Gomushabe (Chairman Parish council)
- AMUDA led by Chris
- Staff and management of Kyamuhunga Peoples SACCO (KYAPS)
- Board of directors of Kyamuhunga Peoples SACCO (KYAPS)
- Former Board of directors of Kyamuhunga Peoples SACCO (KYAPS)
- Head teacher of Sedes vocational school
- Fr. Felix (head teacher of St. Mary's vocational school Kyamuhunga)
- Bishop Comboni Kambuga
- Neighbours of the Kyamuhunga Catholic parish
- Nyakahandagazi Hika of Kyamuhunga
- Daughters of our Lady of Fatuma sisters
- Superior general missionaries sisters of Mary mother of the church and comboni hospital
- Sisters born from Kyamuhunga
- Mukyo Kyamuhunga parish
- Builders of Fr. Paolino
- The family of the late Patrick Byabulakyilya
- St. Mark Vocational Nyakatooma
- Kyamuhunga fraternity
- Carol and Li maine
- BAR Aviation air ambulance
- Focolare Uganda
- Jackline (student of Fr. Paolino)
- Lamethia Health centre III
- Engabo za ukaristiya Kyamuhunga parish
- Abagwisirizi omutima gwa yesu
- The family of Agatha and Mike Kakooza
- Catholics of Bitooma Catholic parish
- The family of the late Elineliko Wamala from Burunga parish
- Abazaveri ba kyamuhunga parish
- Fr. Paolino's Burial organising committee
- Mary Hill High school old girls association
- The family of Gaffa
- St. Mary's old students' association
- State wide insurance (SWICO) Uganda
- Head catechists led by Baryakabo and Baliyo
- Aline Maria Kemelwa (Ambassador of Uganda to Italy)

== Speeches at the Fr. Paolino Tomaino's burial ==
=== Lambert Bainomugisha's speech ===
In his reflection as translated from Runyankole, Lambert thanked God for the life as a person and the life of priesthood that he gave to Fr. Paolino. He also he told the mourners that, Fr. Paolino was not a small man and that he was a big man but in the eyes of God, Fr. Paolino saw himself as a small Paolino and also for following in the footsteps of Saint Paul, Fr. Paolino was a small Paul. He informed the mourners that they were happy as they were escorting Fr. Paolino, a man who spent most of his time in Uganda both in youth days and also old days. He told the mourners that they saw Fr. Paolino, walked with him, eat with him, listened to his teachings, stayed with him, he broke the bread amongst them and also gave his life celebrating with them, celebrated the holy mass with them. And that Fr. Paolino gave in his body for them and also bled his blood for them. He told the mourners that there is confusion as the mourners will not be seeing Fr. Paolino as they used to see him. And that they are happy, God sent a messenger amongst them, he stayed with them, and they learnt many things from him and also him learning many things from him. And Lambert, prayed that God grant him an eternal rest in Heaven. And that he was a man who did great things for the church and the nation (Uganda).

Lambert told the mourners that Fr. Paolino followed the footsteps of St. Paul. He also said that "...Fr. Paulino preached in season and out of season. He hinged on Christ as the Priest. He followed the way of Christ. He revealed the truth of Christ, he modeled his life on the life of Christ. He came to Uganda in 1965 when I was 4 years old. He has been more of a Ugandan than many of us. He has been with us in life and has chosen to be with us in death. For the Bakiga, Paulino was a Mukiga, for the Banyankole he was a Munyankole, for the Italians he was an Italian, for the youth he was young. He came to our parishes, communities, homes and our lives that we may have life in abundance. Paulino has a litany onto his name – His Grace Lambert Bainomugisha on Fr. Paulino...".

Lambert also said that, “...we gather here as people of God indebted to Fr. Paulino Tomaino through his ministry and life as a priest and as a person. Paulino means Paul, but small Paul. Paulino was by no means small, he was big in words, in ambitions, in his work, big in all, but small before God, and small in the footsteps of Paul, his patron saint, an Apostle to the nations....".

Lambert also thanked all the people who played a part in burial engagements.

=== Yoweri Museveni's speech ===
Yoweri Museveni's speech was read by Thomas Tayebwa who was the chief mourner. In Museveni's speech, he eulogized father Paolino as a church leader who fought against alcohol abuse, minded about the health of the flock and also their families. And also as a leader who emphasized on both the spiritual and spiritual needs of the people.

Thomas Tayebwa also said that, "He (Tomaino) loved Uganda and the people of Africa", “It took him 9 months to learn the Runyankole - Rukiga language, establish schools, churches, hospitals, and SACCOs in Bushenyi, Kabale, Kanungu, Kiruhura, etc., and over the years, he touched many lives.”, “Rev. Fr. Paolino stood for many things, but his lasting legacy will be his understanding of humanity and efforts to achieve social justice for all, regardless of their religious, ethnic, or social background. Rev. Fr. Paolino will be greatly missed.”

Thomas Tayebwa in his speech said that "Fr. Paulino tried to chase poverty from the region and urged people to learn from him. The president thanked the family of Fr. Paulino for giving him to Africa and particularly to Kigezi and Ankole. Fr. Paulino emphasized morals by preaching against evil acts of alcoholism, poverty, disease and illiteracy by establishing income generating projects, financial institutions, health facilities and schools. He also conserved the environment by planting trees in the dry areas of Rushere and followed the life of Christ who did not only preach but also healed people and gave them life. The president contributed 20 million towards burial expenses and 30 million towards the Fr. Paulino Foundation."

=== Raphael Magezi's speech ===
Magezi is the one who spoke on behalf of the Ankole people. He informed the mourners that "...We are talking about a person who did the work he was supposed to do the way he was supposed to do it; a lesson that at our workplace, we do our work to the best of our ability and God will reward us appropriately. Secondly, Fr. Paulino emphasized education by established over 70 primary schools, and over 5 secondary schools, and his mind was that education is key to development. He teaches us to remain committed to education in order to uplift the society. Thirdly, he started financial institutions so that families can have income generating activities. Currently the Parish Development Model is realizing the intention and goal of Fr. Paulino...".

=== Chris Baryomunsi's speech ===
Baryomunsi spoke on behalf of the Christians from Kabale Diocese (Kigezi region). Baryomunsi said that "... Fr. Paulino approached him at one time and made two requests: to have Ugandan Citizenship and be buried in Uganda when he dies. Both requests were granted through the efforts of President Museveni...", he also said that "...Fr. Paulino worked well with the NRM government by establishing schools, health facilities, financial institutions in order to uplift people’s standards. Fr. Paulino had requested for government intervention to support Sedes Sapientia Girls’ School Kakoni with computers...".

Baryomunsi told the mourners that 30 computers would soon be delivered to Sedes Sapientia Girls’ School Kakoni. He contributed 10 million and also urged the Kabale Diocese and Mbarara Archdiocese to support Fr. Paulino Foundation.

=== Rev. Fr Archangel Ayebare (A parish priest at Kyamuhunga Catholic Parish) ===
Sources:

=== Daniela's speech (Nephew of Fr. Paolino) ===
Daniela requested Thomas Tayebwa to thank Yoweri Museveni on their behalf. He thanked Raphael Magenzi and that every that happened including of the burial arrangements is because of him. The also thanked Fr. Anthony Kimbowa and other comboni missionaries for the help and support they rendered to Fr. Paolino while he is in the hospital. He thanked Fr. JohnBosco for accompanying the body of the late Fr. Paolino Tomaino, thanked Ivan for staying with his uncle Fr. Tomaino in Kyamuhunga. He thanked also his mother as she was too close to Fr. Paolino. He thanked the people of Rushere, Kambuga and Kyamuhunga. He thanked the old boys and old girls of Kambuga for paying the hospital bills for Fr. Paolino. Thanked Jackie the ambassador of Uganda in Italy, Chris Baryomunsi, his wife (Daniella's wife) as she shares the character of Fr. Paolino. Daniella also thanked his father.

Daniela introduced the family members who included; Maria Louisa, Anaritah Tomaino, Betty (his wife) among other relatives

=== Family of Tomaino's speech ===
Fr. Tomaino's sibling read her speech in Italian language.

== Yoweri Museveni meeting the family of Fr. Paolino Tomaino ==
On 18 March 2024, Yoweri Museveni met with the family of the late Fr. Paolino Tomaino that consisted of 20 members at the state house lodge in Entebbe.

=== Museveni's speech ===
In his speech Museveni said that “...I have known the works of the catholic priests here for a long time in all parts of Uganda." "When Raphael Magyezi (Minister for Local Government) told me about Fr. Tomaino's sickness, I said let us support him to get some treatment and when he died from there, I said let us support his wish of being buried here..." "I want to thank the family of Fr. Tomaino, first of all for giving him to Africa and then for supporting him when he was here because those Churches and schools he was building, he was being supported by you (family). And then we thank you for allowing him to be buried here,...”

Yoweri Museveni informed the Fr. Paolino's family that apart from philanthropic work, they should use their social contacts to encourage more Italian businesses and companies to come and invest in here (Uganda) because they will create jobs, add value to Uganda's raw materials and that Italy can play a very big role in the transformation of Africa.

In his speech, Museveni pledged to complete Sedes Serpientie Kanoni Girls School in Kyamuhunga and also award Fr. Paolino Tomaino with a Posthumous award on the 2024 Heroes' day in recognition for his role in transforming Uganda.

=== Maria Luisa speech ===
Maria Luisa (Fr. Paolino's sister) said “Allow me to thank you on behalf of our extended family for loving our son, Fr. Paulino Tomaino. We highly appreciate the support you have extended to Fr. Tomaino for specialized treatment. Although he didn't make it, we appreciate the rich heart you exhibited, Your Excellency", “We appreciate you for having allowed his wish of being buried in Uganda by repatriation of his body, facilitating 20 family members to accompany him to his resting place in Uganda.” during the meeting with Yoweri Museveni.

== Works and legacy ==
Father Tomaino founded schools, health centers, churches, financial institutions, built wells and roads in districts which include Bushenyi, Kabale, Kanungu, Kiruhura. His missionary works were supported by his family, many parish groups, individuals, and associations.

=== Schools ===
- Bishop Comboni College Kambuga in 1982.
- San Giovanni School in Makiro.
- St. Charles Lwanga Zorooma in Kanungu District.
- St. Mark Vocational School in Nyakatooma in 2018.
- St. Mary's college Kyamuhunga.
- Sedes Sapietiae Vocational School Kakoni.
- St. Mary's Vocational School Kyamuhunga.
- St. John Baptist primary school in Ntugamo.
- Sedes Sapietiae Academiae Rushere.
- St. Peter's secondary School Rwebigumya in Kazo District together which was co-founded with Fr. Sean Dempsey.
- built more classrooms for St. John Baptist Primary School Ntungamo .
- Sedes Sapiencia Girls School in Kiruhura District.
- Nyakatooma III primary school in Bushenyi.

=== Health centres ===
- St. Daniel Comboni Hospital Kyamuhunga in 1994. It started as Health Centre II and gazetted as a hospital in May 1996.
- St. Mary's Hospital.
- St. Mary's primary school.
- Health Centre in Kyeibuza.
- Health Centre in Burunga.
- Lamezia Health centre in Burunga in Kazo district.

=== Religious institutions ===
- He built two blocks of buildings at Karujanga Rwanyena Parish.
- Opened up Kambuga parish in 1976.
- Opened up Kyamuhunga parish.

=== Financial institutions ===
- Kyamuhunga Peoples SACCO (KYAPS).
- Rushere SACCO.

=== Foundations and associations ===
- Fr. Paolino Foundation in Rushere, Kiruhura.
- Friends of Father Paolino Association which is based in Lamezia Terme.

=== Farming and Agriculture ===
- Rugongi Dairy Farm

=== Other works ===
- Fr. Paolino translated the Roman Version of the Holy Missa to Runyankole – Rikiga language with the help of Fr. Marius Chestanino.
- Fr. Paolino founded the Kitumba Printing Press in Kabale together with Fr. Marius Chestanino.

== Gallery of Institutions founded by Fr. Paolino Tomaino ==
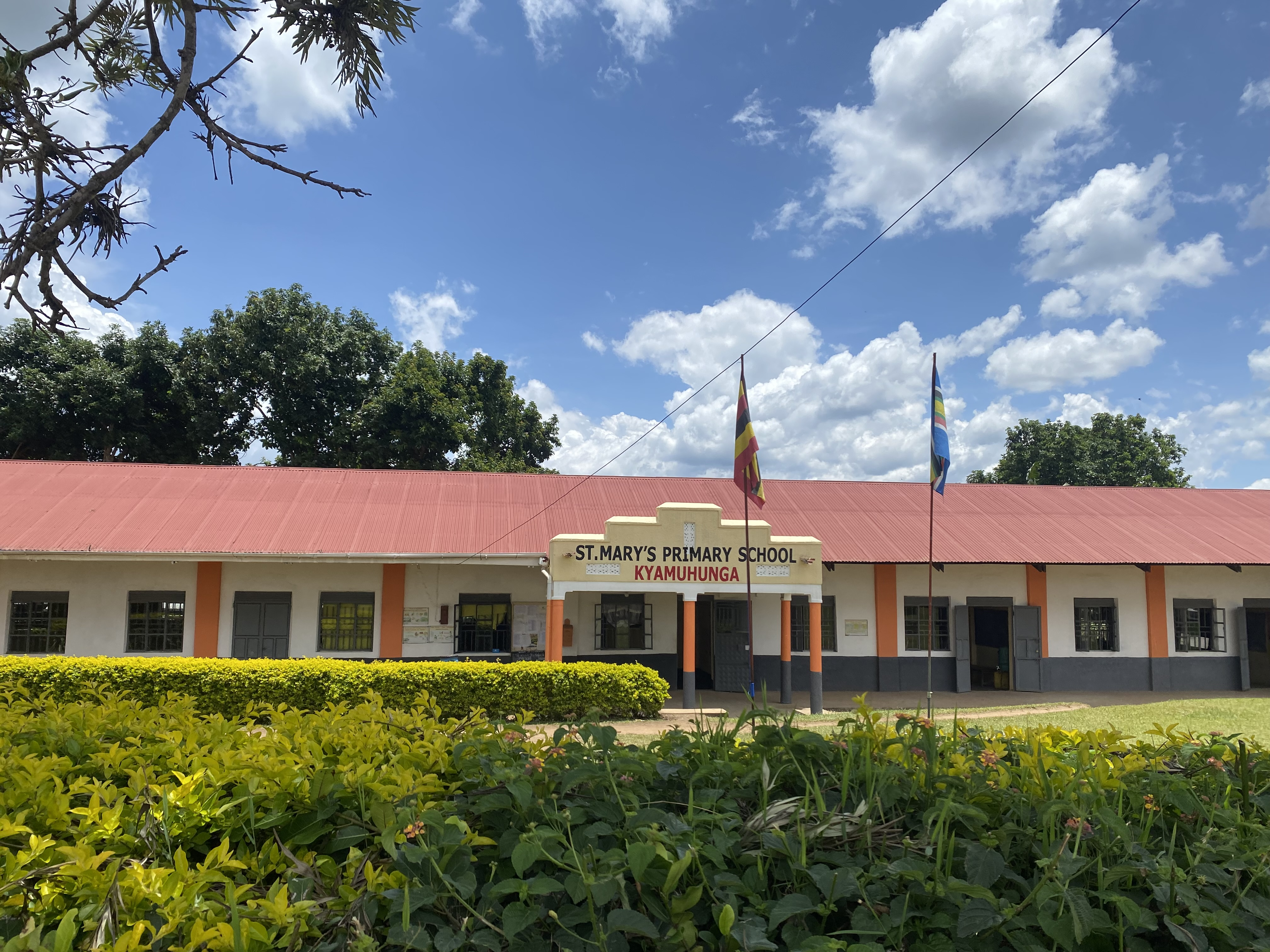

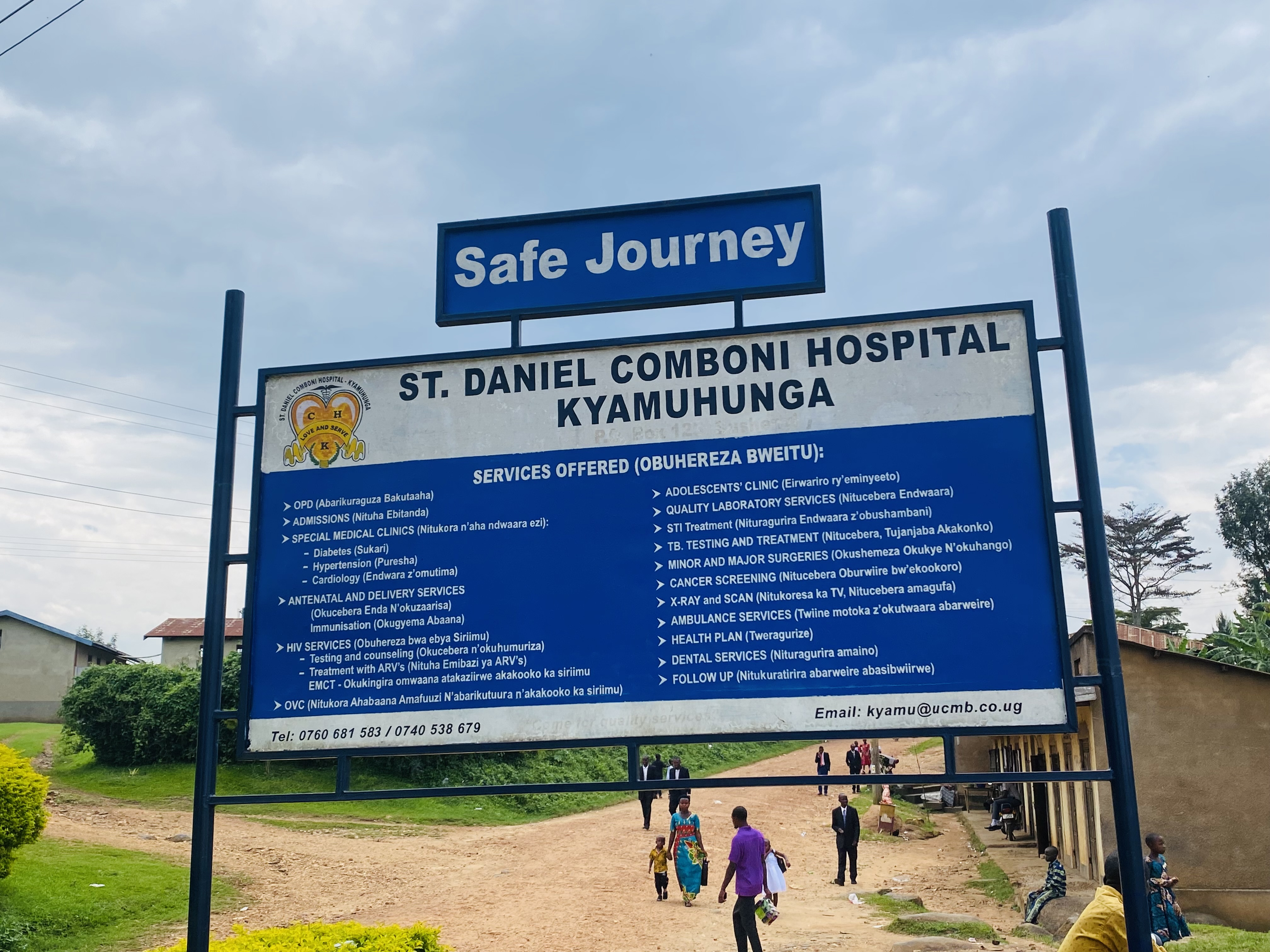

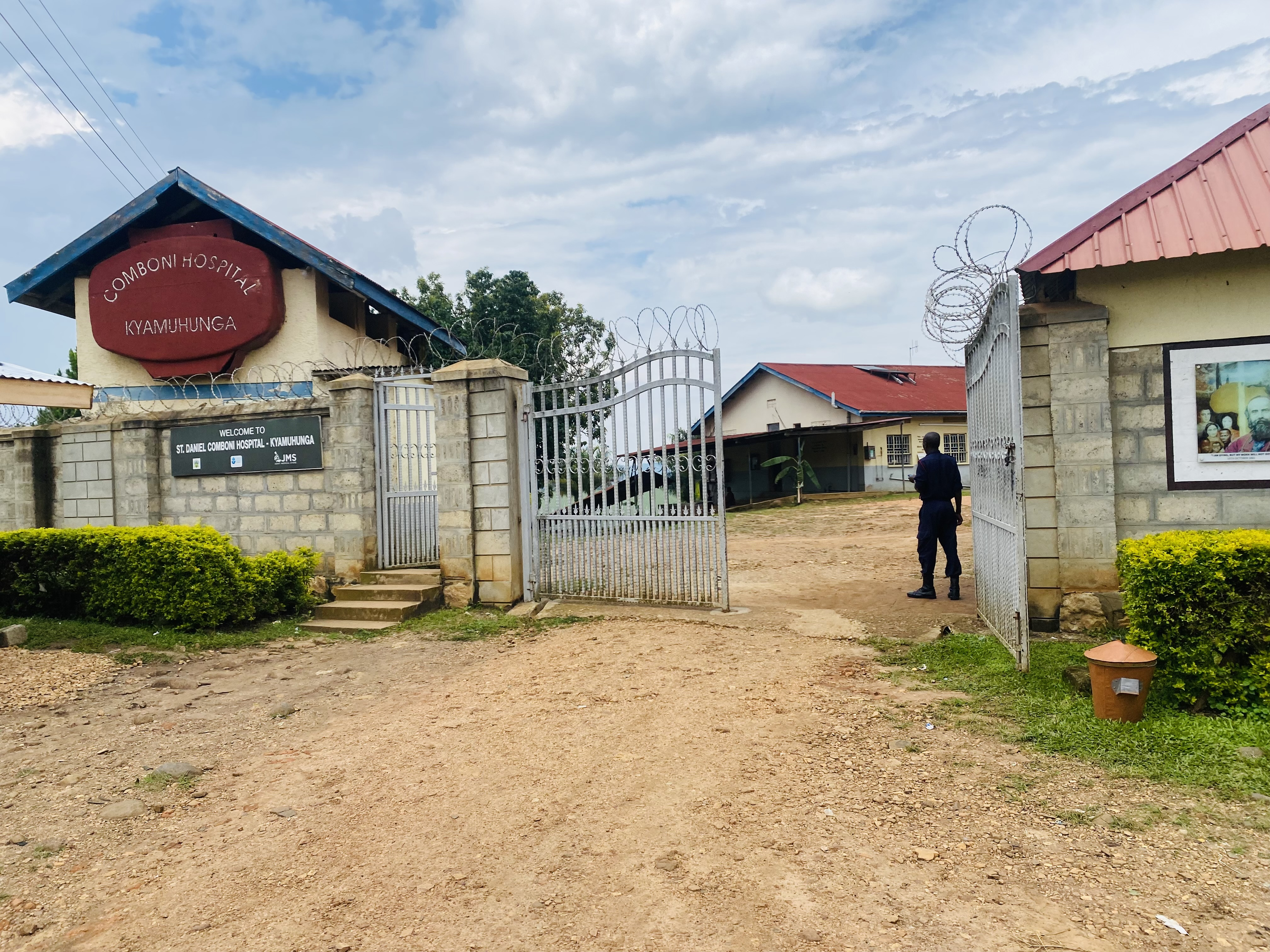

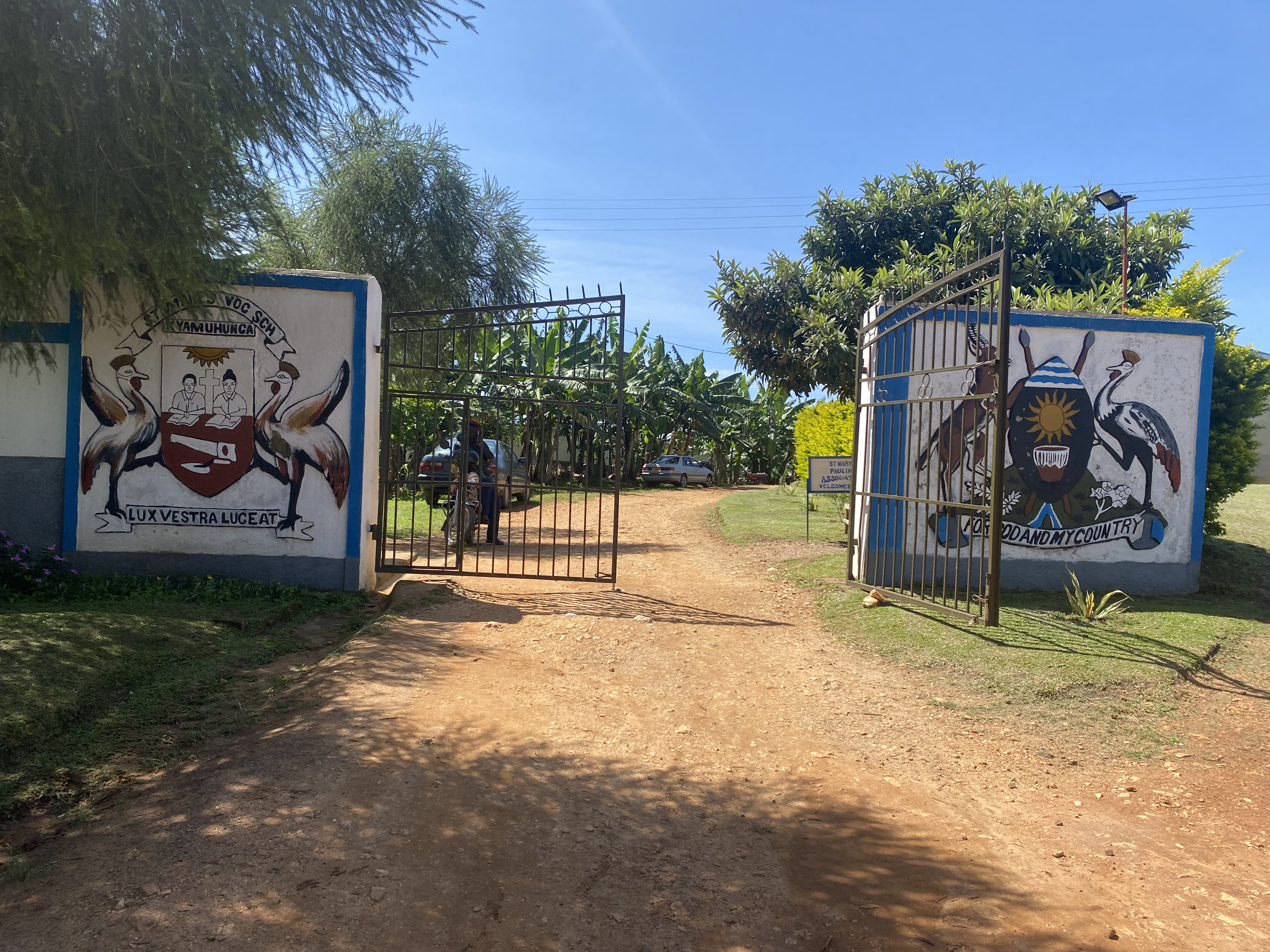

== Gallery of Fr. Paolino Tomaino funeral and burial ==
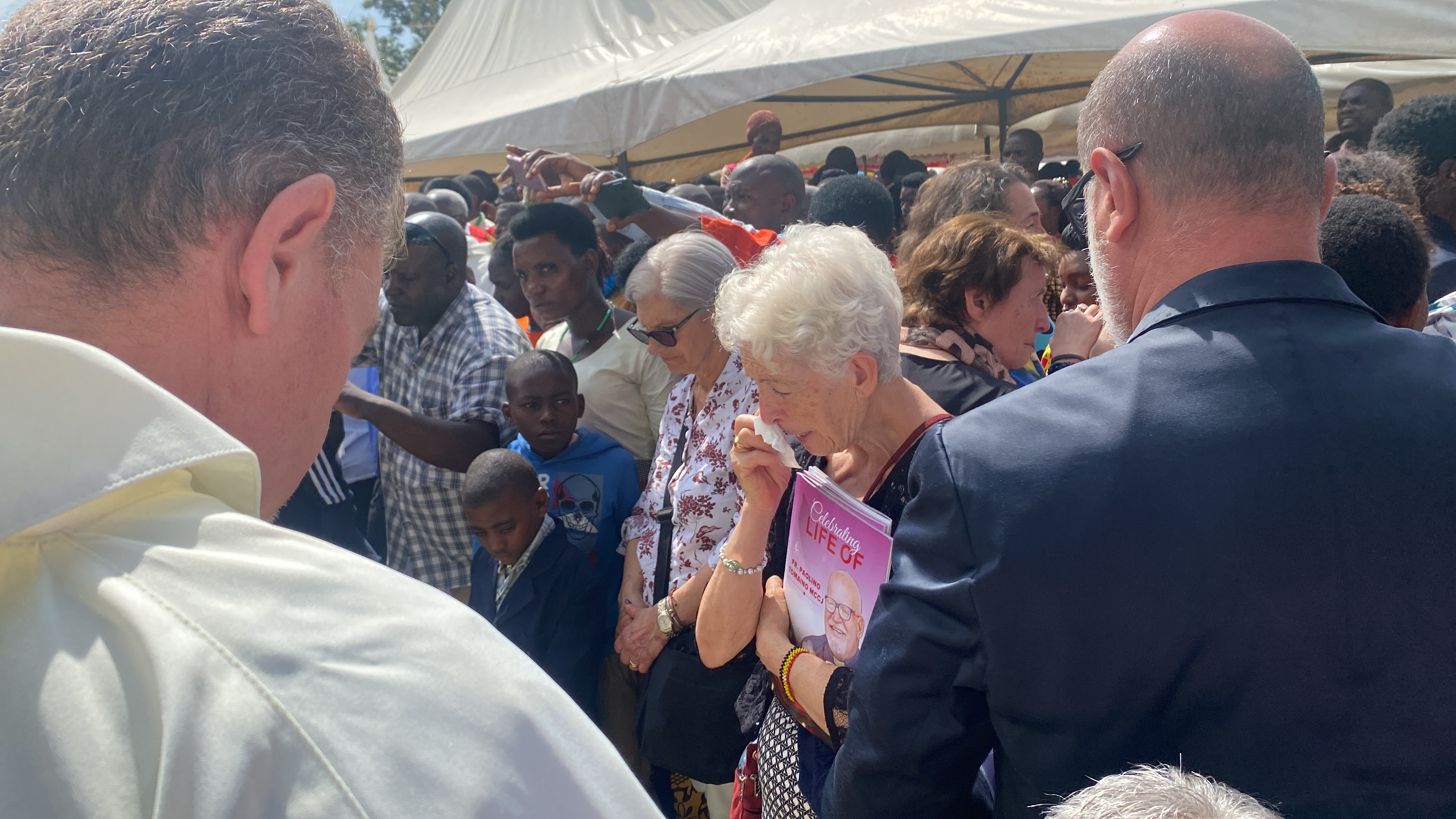

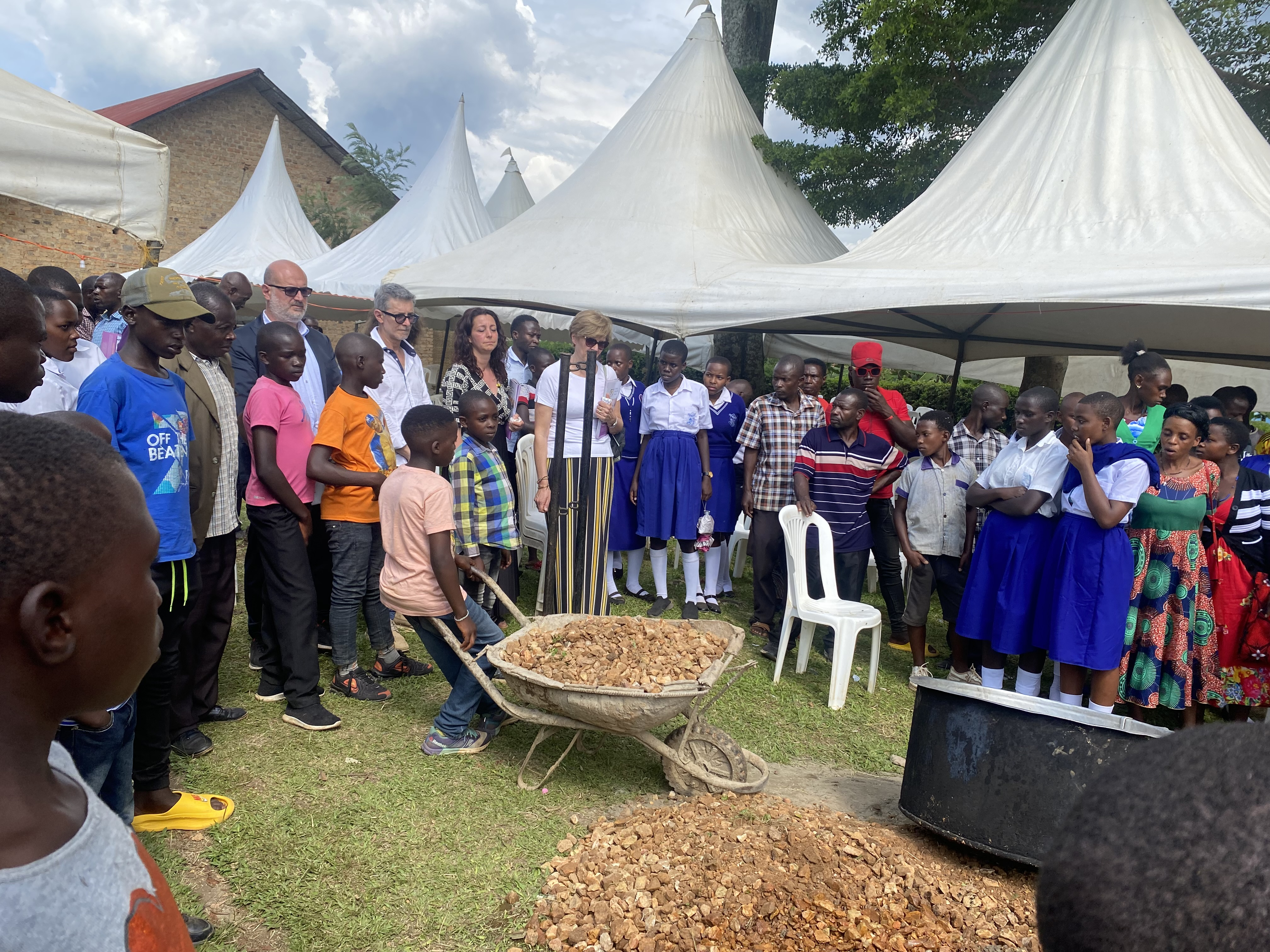

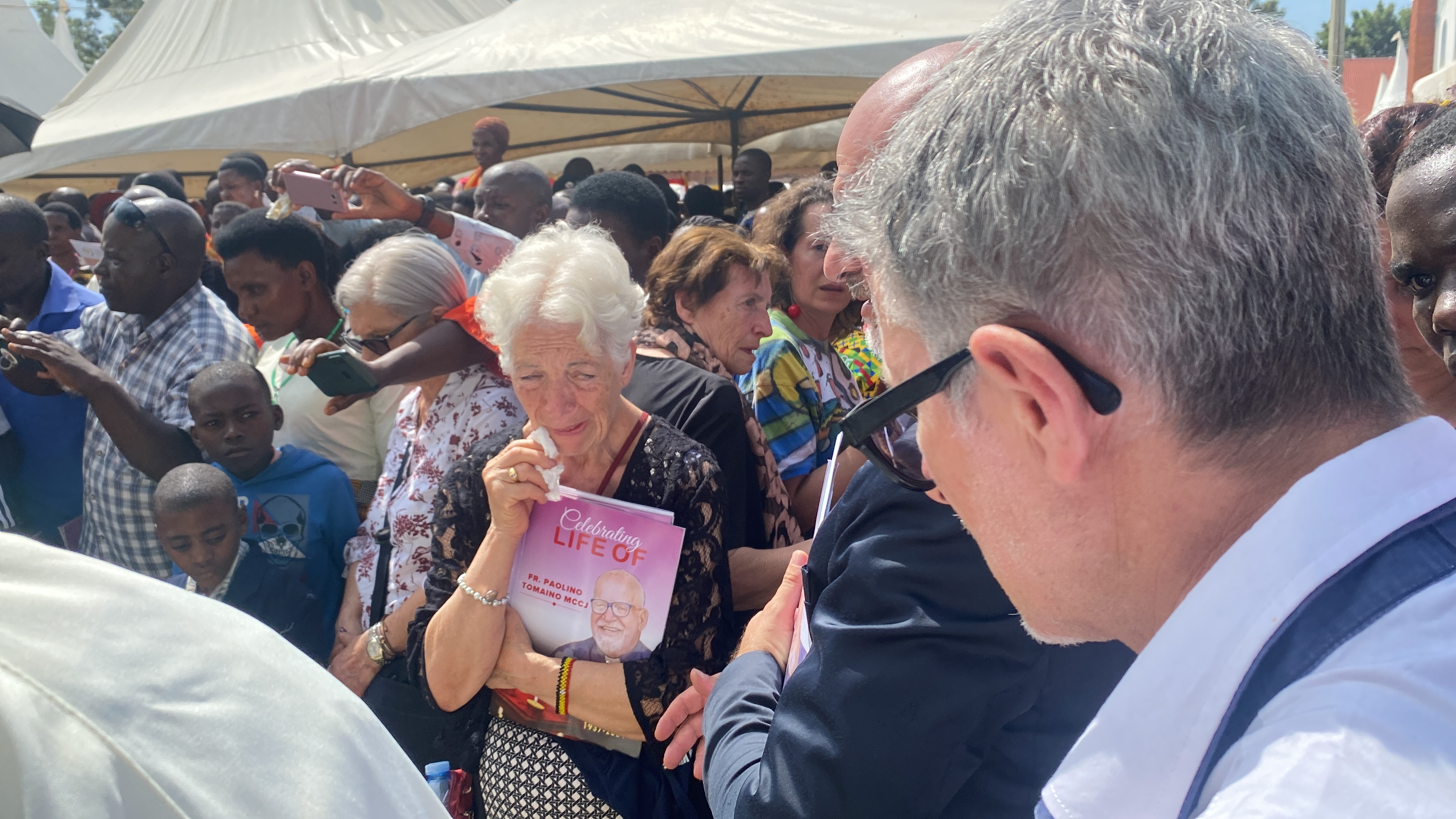

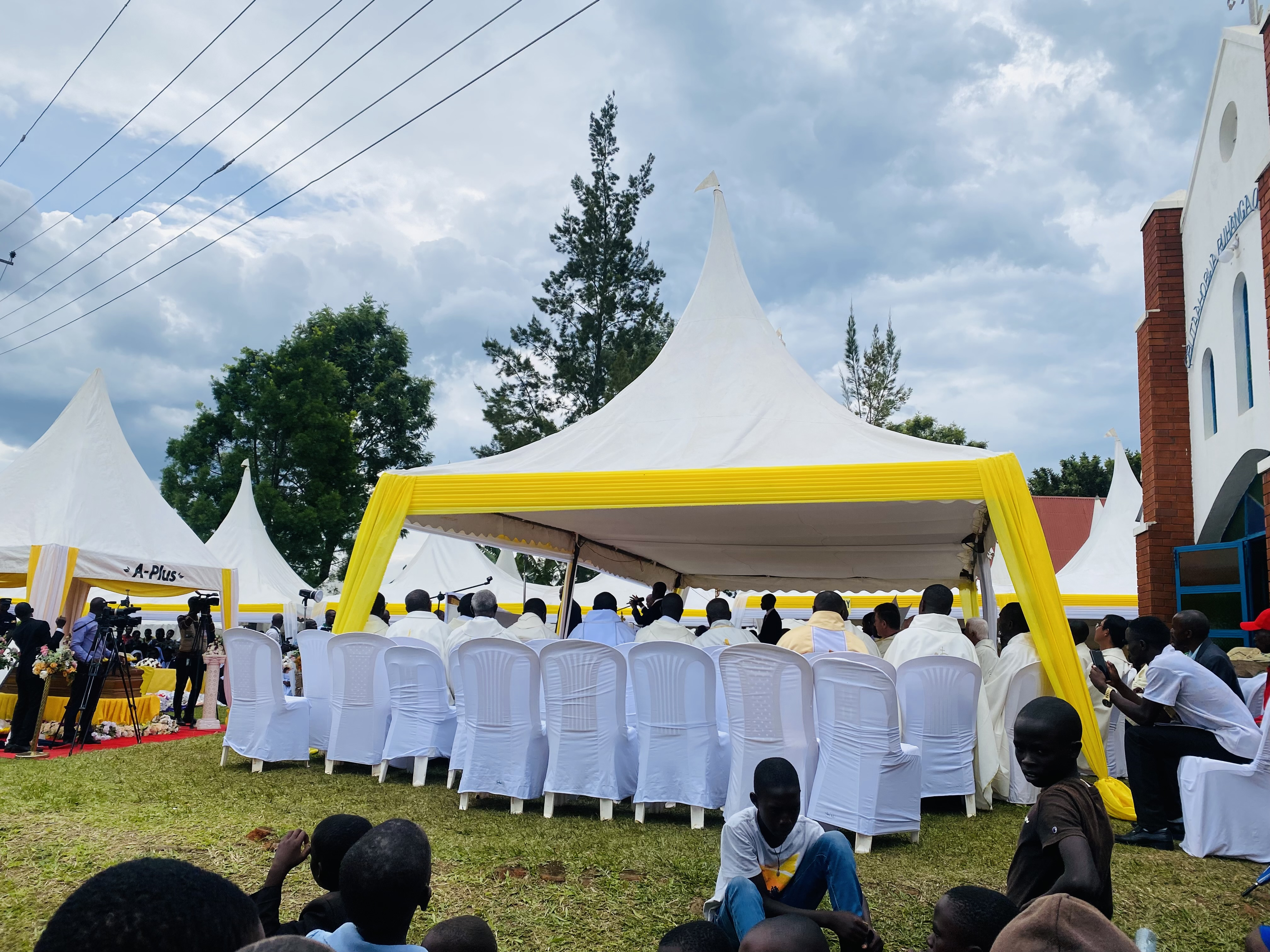

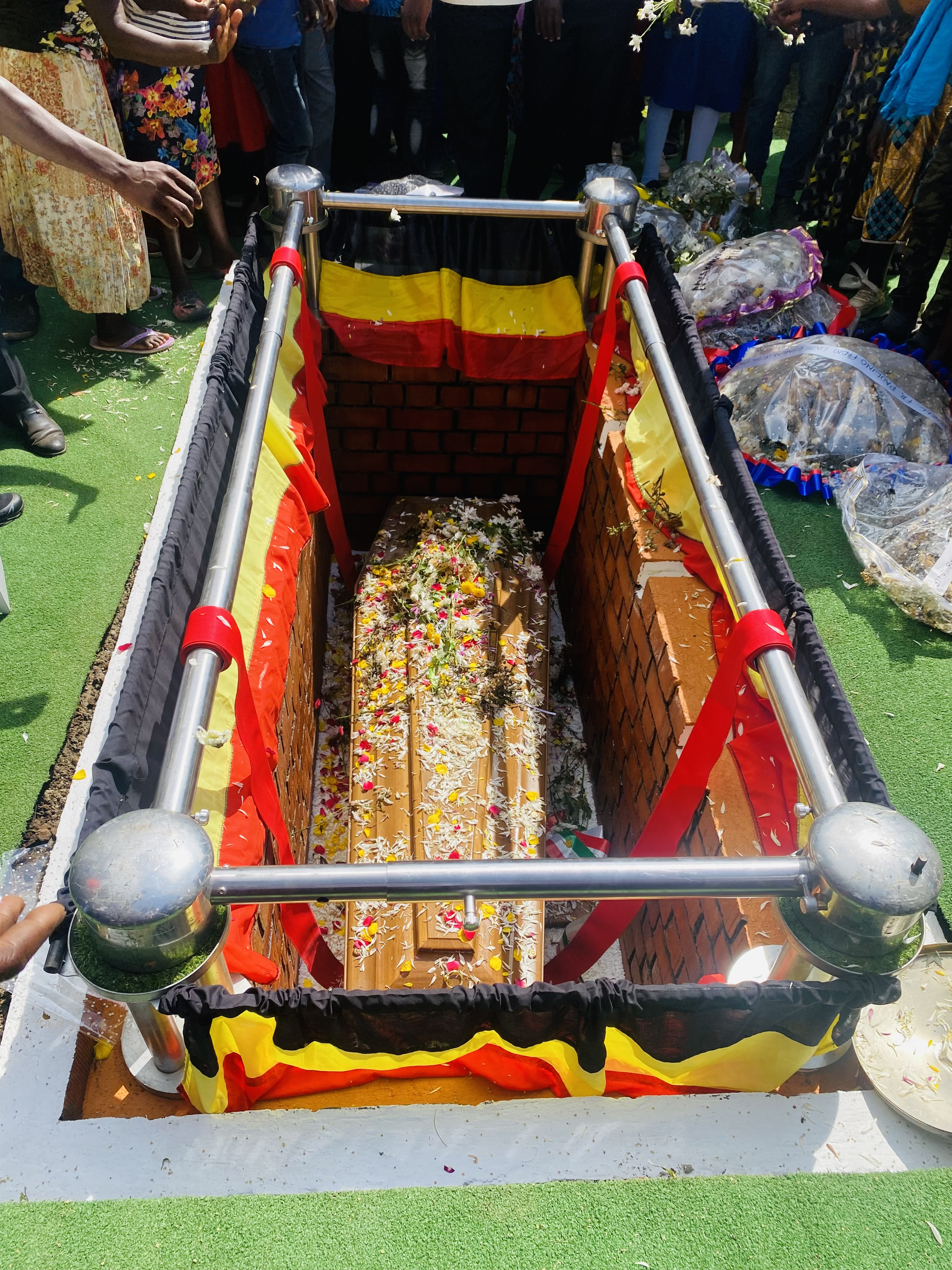

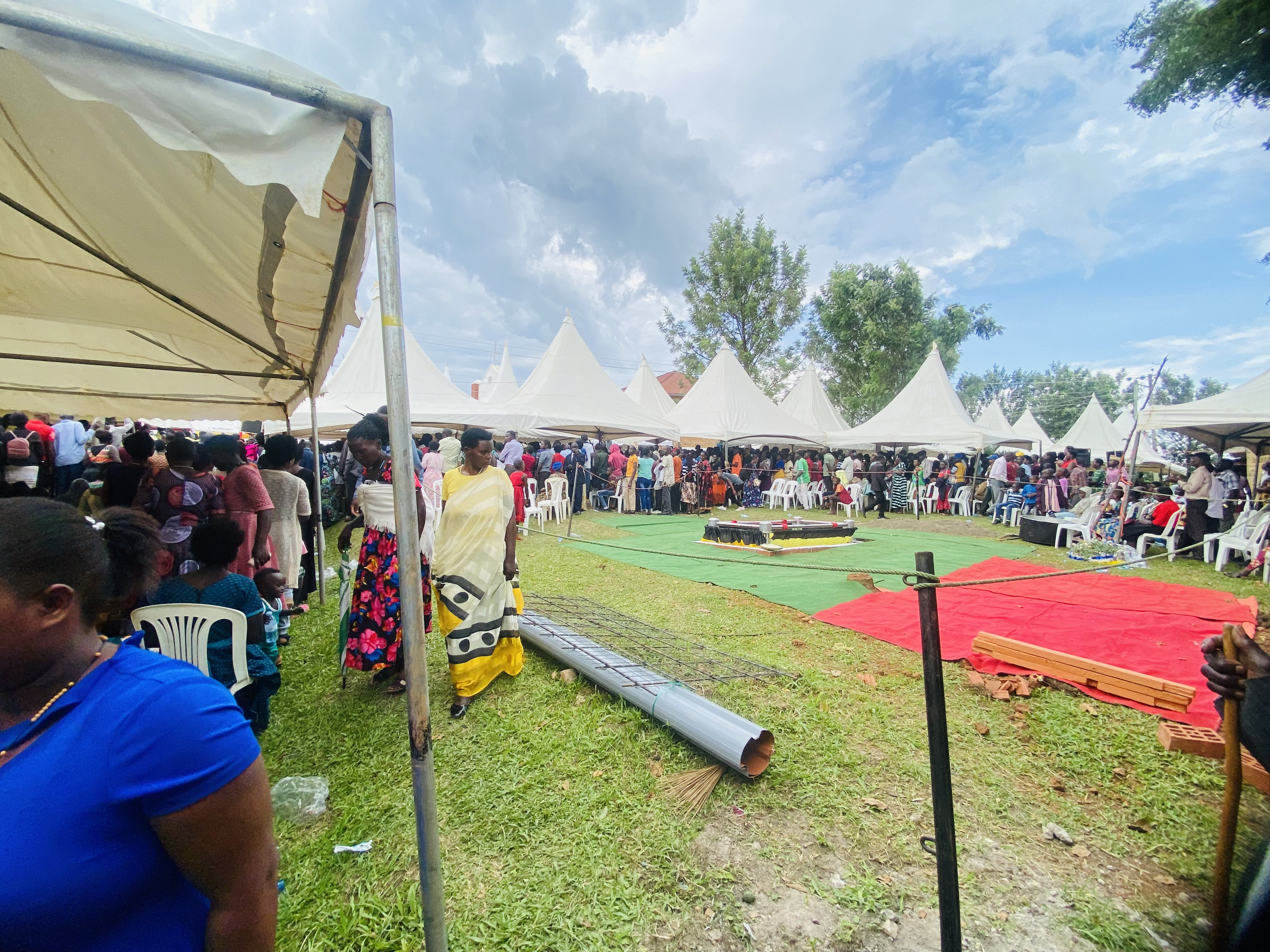

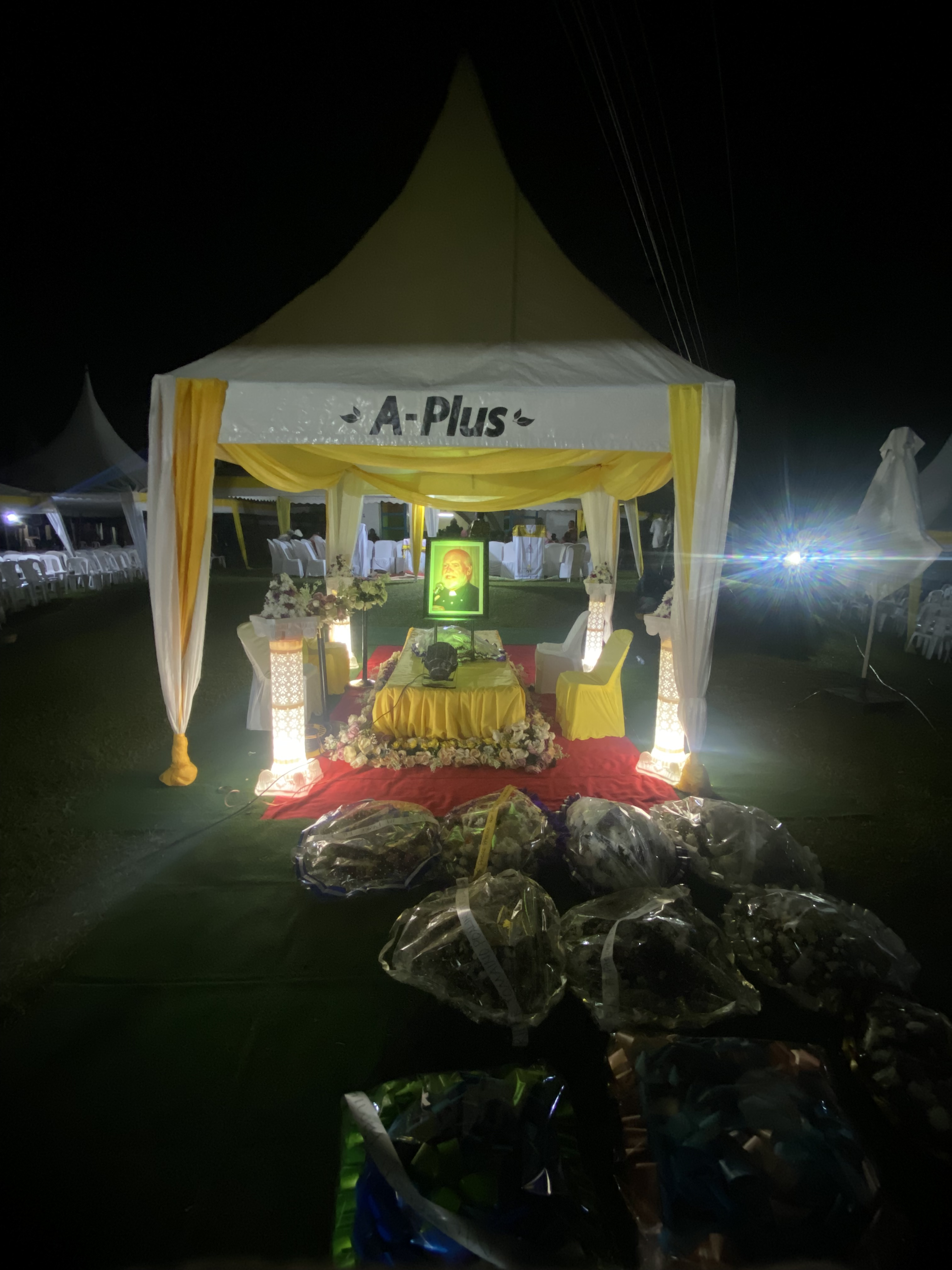

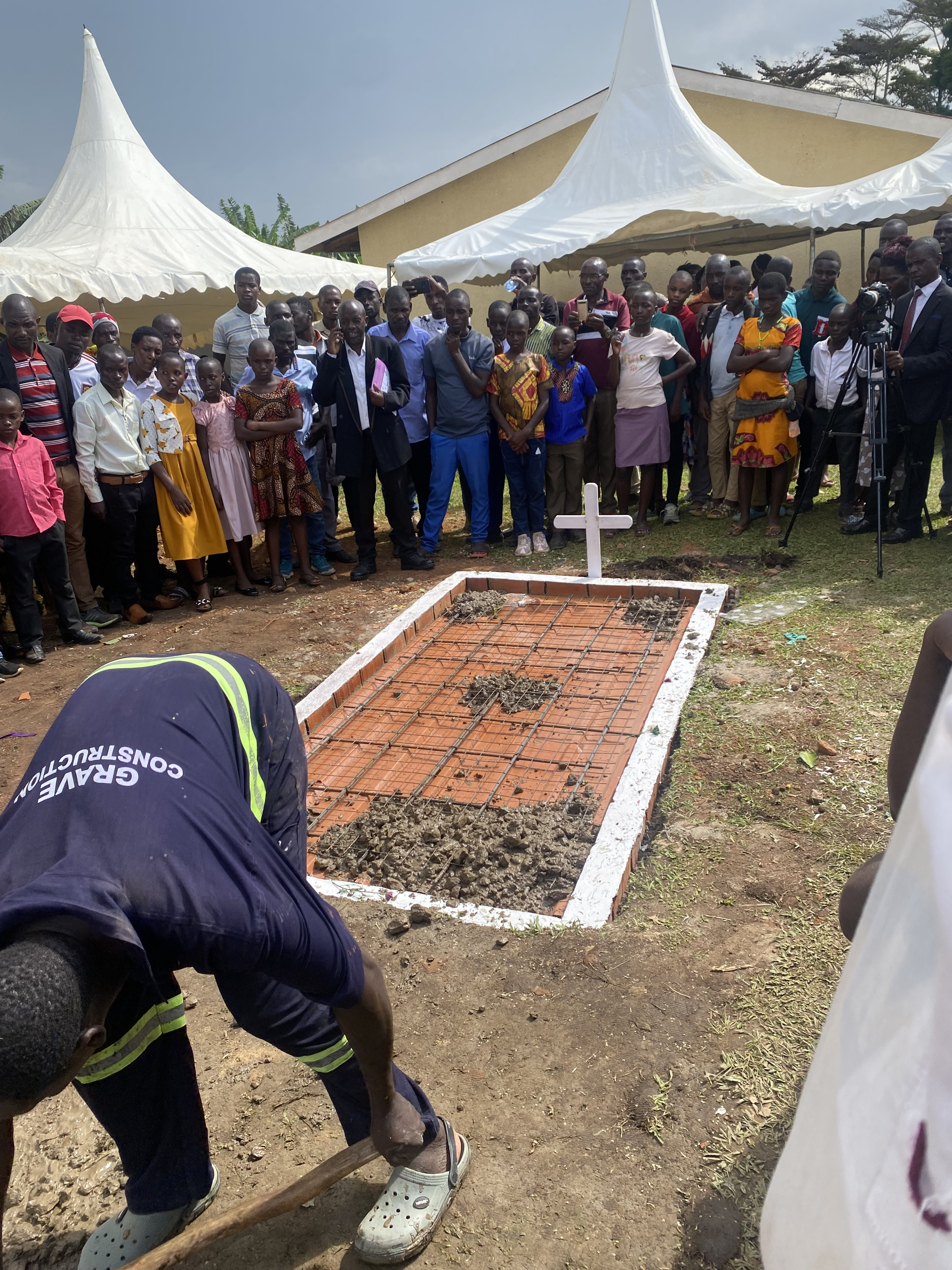

== Read also ==
- Saint Daniele Comboni
- Comboni Missionaries of the Heart of Jesus
- The White Fathers Mission in Uganda
- Cyprian Kizito Lwanga
- Catholic Church in Uganda
- Uganda Martyrs
