= Robert Marie Gay =

Canadian-born Ugandan Catholic bishop

The Right Reverend Robert Gay
- Bishop Emeritus of Kabale
- Church: Roman Catholic Church
- Archdiocese: Mbarara
- See: Kabale
- Appointed: 11 January 1996
- Term ended: 15 March 2003
- Predecessor: Barnabas Rugwizangonga Halem ’Imana
- Successor: Callistus Rubaramira
- Other post: Superior General of Missionaries of Africa (White Fathers) (1980 -1986)

Orders
- Ordination: 30 January 1954
- Consecration: 9 March 1996 by Emmanuel Wamala
- Rank: Bishop

Personal details
- Born: Robert Marie Gay; 22 January 1927 Ottawa, Ontario, Canada
- Died: 29 June 2016 (aged 89) Sherbrooke, Quebec, Canada

Robert Marie Gay (22 January 1927 – 29 June 2016) was a Canadian-born Ugandan Roman Catholic prelate. He was the second bishop of the Roman Catholic Diocese of Kabale from 1996 to 2003.

== Background and priesthood ==
Gay was born in Ottawa, Ontario on 22 January 1927. He joined the missionary congregation of the Missionaries of Africa and on 30 January 1954 was ordained as priest. He served as Superior General of Missionaries of Africa (White Fathers), from 1980 until 1986.

== As bishop ==
Gay was appointed bishop by the Pope John Paul II on 11 January 1996. He was consecrated to the Episcopate on 9 March 1996. The principal consecrator was Cardinal Emmanuel Wamala, Archbishop of the Archdiocese of Kampala, assisted by Bishop Barnabas Rugwizangonga Halem ’Imana, Bishop Emeritus of Kabale and Bishop Paul Kamuza Bakyenga, Bishop of Mbarara. Bishop Gay retired on 15 March 2003.

== Sickness and death ==
Gay died on 29 June 2016 at Passages Hospice, in Sherbrooke, Quebec, Canada, at the age of 89 years.

== See also ==
- Uganda Martyrs
- Roman Catholicism in Uganda

Catholic Church titles
Preceded by Barnabas R. Halem ’Imana	Diocese of Kabale; 1996–2003	Succeeded by Callistus Rubaramira
