= Callistus Rubaramira =

Ugandan Catholic prelate

- Bishop Emeritus of Kabale, Uganda
- Church: Roman Catholic Church
- Archdiocese: Mbarara
- See: Kabale
- Appointed: 15 March 2003
- Installed: 8 June 2003
- Term ended: 15 July 2026
- Predecessor: Robert Marie Gay
- Successor: Bonaventure Bosco Gubazire

Orders
- Ordination: 18 May 1975
- Consecration: 8 June 2003 by Robert Marie Gay
- Rank: Bishop

Personal details
- Born: Callistus Rubaramira; 8 February 1950 (age 76) Rubira-Kyanamira Village, Kabale District, Diocese of Kabale, Uganda

Styles of Callistus Rubaramira
- Reference style
- Religious style: Bishop

Callistus Rubaramira (born 8 February 1950), is a Roman Catholic prelate, who served as the Bishop of the Roman Catholic Diocese of Kabale, in Uganda. He was appointed bishop on 15 March 2003 by Pope John Paul II. Pope Leo XIV accepted his age-related resignation on 15 July 2026.

== Early life and education ==
Rubaramira was born on 8 February 1950, at Rubira-Kyanamira Village, in Kabale District in the Western Region of Uganda. This lies in Rushoroza Parish, in the Diocese of Kabale, a suffragan diocese of the Metropolitan ecclesiastical province of Mbarara. His parents are Cyprion Kwigira and Seforoza Bamusibane. He is the second-born in a family of ten siblings (six brothers and three sisters). He attended Saint Francis Kyanamira Primary School for his primary education, Saint Paul's Seminary Mutolere for his O-Level education, and he completed his A-Level studies at Kitabi Seminary in Bushenyi.

He studied philosophy at Katigondo National Major Seminary, in Kalungu District. He then transferred to Ggaba National Major Seminary, in Ggaba, where he studied Theology. He graduated with a Bachelor's degree from Katigondo (BA in Philosophy) and from Ggaba (BA in Theology). Later he was awarded a Master of Business Administration (MBA) from the University of Portland in Oregon, in the United States.

== Priest ==
He was ordained deacon on 29 December 1974. On 18 May 1975, he was ordained a priest of Kabale Diocese. He served as priest in the Roman Catholic Diocese of Kabale until 15 March 2003.

Among the service roles that he has gone through as priest include:

- Parish priest and Apostolic Vicar in Rukungiri District
- Secretary to the bishop of the Roman Catholic Diocese of Kabale
- Chancellor of the Diocese of Kabale
- Diocesan treasurer of the Diocese of Kabale
- Diocesan financial administrator of the Diocese of Kabale.

== As bishop ==
He was appointed bishop of the Roman Catholic Diocese of Kabale, on 15 March 2003. He was consecrated as bishop on 8 June 2003 at Kabale by Bishop Robert Marie Gay, Bishop Emeritus of Kabale, assisted by Bishop Barnabas Rugwizangonga Halem ’Imana, Bishop Emeritus of Kabale and Archbishop Paul Kamuza Bakyenga, Archbishop of Roman Catholic Archdiocese of Mbarara.

On 25 August 2024 Bishop Callistus Rubaramira was installed as the chancellor of St. Ignatius University Kabale (IGUKA). The ceremony took place on the university's campus in Rusoroza, Kabale Municipality.

On 15 July 2026, Pope Leo XIV accepted the age-related resignation of Bishop Callistus Rubaramira from the pastoral care of the Catholic Diocese of Kabale in Uganda. On the same day, Reverend Father Monsignor Bonaventure Bosco Gubazire, M. Afr., previously Rector of Saint Martin of Tours Formation House in Ejisu, Ghana, was appointed to succeed him.

== See also ==
- Uganda Martyrs
- Catholic Church in Uganda

== Succession table ==
Preceded by Robert Marie Gay (11 January 1996 – 15 March 2003)	Bishop of Diocese of Kabale (15 March 2003 – 15 July 2026)	Succeeded by Bonaventure Bosco Gubazire (since 15 July 2026)
