= Matthias Ssekamaanya =

Ugandan Catholic prelate (born 1n 1936)

The Most Reverend Matthias Ssekamaanya
- Bishop Emeritus of Lugazi, Uganda
- Church: Catholic Church
- Archdiocese: Roman Catholic Archdiocese of Kampala
- See: Lugazi
- Appointed: 30 November 1996
- Installed: 30 November 1996
- Term ended: 4 November 2014
- Predecessor: None (Diocese created)
- Successor: Christopher Kakooza
- Other post: Auxiliary Bishop of the Roman Catholic Archdiocese of Kampala (9 March 1985 - 30 November 1996)

Orders
- Ordination: 19 December 1965
- Consecration: 8 May 1960 by Cardinal Emmanuel Kiwanuka Nsubuga
- Rank: Bishop

Personal details
- Born: Matthias Ssekamaanya; 15 October 1936 (age 89) Kasolo Village, Mubende District, Diocese of Kiyinda-Mityana, Uganda

Styles of Matthias Ssekamaanya
- Reference style: Your Lordship; The Most Reverend
- Spoken style: His Lordship
- Religious style: Bishop

Matthias Ssekamaanya (born 15 October 1936), is a Ugandan Roman Catholic prelate who is the Bishop Emeritus of the Roman Catholic Diocese of Lugazi, Uganda. He served as bishop of Lugazi from 30 November 1996 until his retirement on 4 November 2014. Before that, from 9 March 1985 until 30 November 1996 he was Auxiliary Bishop of the Roman Catholic Archdiocese of Kampala. He was appointed bishop on 9 March 1985 by Pope John Paul II. He retired as bishop on 4 November 2014 and lives on as Bishop Emeritus of Lugazi, Uganda.

== Early life and priesthood ==
Ssekamaanya was born on 15 October 1936, in Kasolo Village, in present-day Mubende District in the Buganda Region of Uganda. He was ordained priest on 19 December 1965 at the Archdiocese of Kampala and served as priest in Kampala Archdiocese, until 9 March 1985.

== As bishop ==
He was appointed bishop on 9 March 1985, serving as Auxiliary Bishop of Kampala and as Titular Bishop of Iziriana. He was ordained bishop on 2 June 1985 at Kampala by Cardinal Emmanuel Kiwanuka Nsubuga†, Archbishop of Kampala, assisted by Bishop Barnabas Rugwizangonga Halem ’Imana†, Bishop of Kabale and Bishop Paul Lokiru Kalanda†, Bishop of Moroto.

He was appointed Bishop of the Diocese of Lugazi on 30 November 1996 by Pope John Paul II and installed as the first (founding) Bishop of Lugazi. On 4 November 2014, his age-related resignation was accepted by Pope Francis, who appointed Bishop Christopher Kakooza as his replacement.

== See also ==
- Uganda Martyrs
- Roman Catholicism in Uganda

== Succession table ==
Preceded by None	Bishop of Lugazi; 1985 - 2014	Succeeded by Christopher Kakooza
