= Lambert Bainomugisha =

Ugandan Roman Catholic archbishop

The Most Reverend Lambert Bainomugisha
- Archbishop of Mbarara
- Church: Roman Catholic Church
- Archdiocese: Mbarara
- See: Mbarara
- Appointed: 25 April 2020
- Installed: 20 June 2020
- Predecessor: Paul Kamuza Bakyenga
- Previous posts: Titular Bishop of Tacia montana (2005-20); Auxiliary Bishop of Mbarara (2005-20); Apostolic Administrator of Hoima (2009-15)

Orders
- Ordination: 13 July 1991
- Consecration: 1 October 2005 by Paul Kamuza Bakyenga

Personal details
- Born: Lambert Bainomugisha; 12 July 1961 (age 65) Kashumba, Isingiro District, Western Region, Uganda
- Education: Saint Paul University

Lambert Bainomugisha (born 12 July 1961), is a Ugandan Roman Catholic prelate, who is currently the Archbishop of the Roman Catholic Archdiocese of Mbarara, in Uganda, since 25 April 2020. He was formally installed as archbishop of the archdiocese later on 20 June 2020.

== Early life, education and priesthood ==
Bainomugisha was born on 12 July 1961, at Kashumba, in present-day Isingiro District in the Western Region of Uganda. He is the son of Joseph Mugenyi and Maltida Kahwa. He was ordained priest on 13 July 1991 at Mbarara. He attended Buhungiro Church School, Kyabahesi Church School, Kiyenje Primary School before joining St. Francis Xavier Minor Seminary in Kitabi, Bushenyi District for his secondary education. Bainomugisha studied philosophy at St. Thomas Aquinas Major Seminary in Katigondo, Masaka and theology at St. Mary's National Major Seminary, Ggaba, Kampala. He served as priest in the Roman Catholic Archdiocese of Mbarara until 2 July 2005. On that day, he was appointed bishop. Archbishop Bainomugisha holds a degree of Doctor of Philosophy in Canon Law, obtained from Saint Paul University, in Ottawa, Canada. After further studies in Canada, he returned to Uganda and served in several roles, including:

- Chancellor of the Archdiocese of Mbarara(2000-2005)
- Chaplain at Corpus Christi Chaplaincy, Mbarara University of Science and Technology(2002-2003)
- Parish priest in various assignments with archdiocese

== As bishop ==
He was appointed auxiliary bishop of the Roman Catholic Archdiocese of Mbarara, on 2 July 2005. He was consecrated as bishop on 1 October 2005 at Mbarara by Archbishop Paul Kamuza Bakyenga, Archbishop of Mbarara, assisted by Bishop John Baptist Kakubi†, Bishop Emeritus of Mbarara and Bishop Callistus Rubaramira, Bishop of Kabale.

He was appointed to Archbishop of the same archdiocese on 25 April 2020, when Pope Francis accepted the resignation of Paul Kamuza Bakyenga, who had reached the retirement age of 75 years, on 30 June 2019. He was installed as archbishop on 20 June 2020, at Mbarara.

== See also ==
- Uganda Martyrs
- Roman Catholicism in Uganda
- Uganda Episcopal Conference
- Catholic Church in Uganda
- Vincent Kirabo
