= Christopher Kakooza =

Ugandan Roman Catholic prelate (born in 1952)

The Most Reverend Christopher Kakooza
- Bishop of Lugazi, Uganda
- Church: Roman Catholic Church
- Archdiocese: Roman Catholic Archdiocese of Kampala
- See: Roman Catholic Diocese of Lugazi
- Appointed: 4 November 2014
- Installed: 3 January 2015
- Predecessor: Matthias Ssekamaanya
- Successor: Incumbent
- Other post: Auxiliary Bishop of Kampala (2 January 1999 - 4 November 2014)

Orders
- Ordination: 3 June 1983
- Consecration: 17 April 1999 by Emmanuel Kiwanuka Nsubuga
- Rank: Bishop

Personal details
- Born: Christopher Kakooza; 15 November 1952 (age 73) Lusaze, Rubaga Division, Kampala, Uganda

Styles of Christopher Kakooza
- Reference style: The Most Reverend
- Religious style: Bishop

Christopher Kakooza (born 15 November 1952), is a Roman Catholic prelate who is the Bishop of the Roman Catholic Diocese of Lugazi, in Uganda, since 4 November 2014. Before that, from 2 January 1999 until 4 November 2014, he served as Auxiliary Bishop of the Roman Catholic Archdiocese of Kampala. While auxiliary bishop, he was concurrently assigned as Titular Bushop of Numidia. He was appointed bishop by Pope John Paul II. He received his episcopal concecration on 17 April 1999. The Principal Consecrator was Cardinal Emmanuel Wamala, Archbishop of Kampala. On 4 November 2014, Pope Francis transferred him to Lugazi and appointed him local ordinary there. He was installed at Lugazi on 3 January 2015.

== Early life and priesthood ==
Kakooza was born on 15 November 1952, at Nsambya Hospital. His parents lived in the neighborhood called Lusaze, in present-day Rubaga Division, in Kampala, in the Archdiocese of Kampala. He was ordained priest on 3 June 1983 at Saint Mbaaga's Major Seminary Ggaba, as a member of the pioneer class at that seminary.

He was appointed Auxiliary Bishop of the Roman Catholic Archdiocese of Kampala, and contemporaneously as Titular Bishop of Casae in Numidia, on 2 January 1999.

== As bishop ==
He was appointed bishop on 2 January 1999. He was consecrated as bishop on 17 April 1999 at Rubaga Cathedral, the seat of Kampala Archdiocese, by Cardinal Emmanuel Wamala, Archbishop of Kampala, assisted by Bishop John Baptist Kaggwa, Bishop of Masaka and Bishop Matthias Ssekamaanya, Bishop of Lugazi.

Christoper Kakooza was appointed Bishop of Lugazi on 4 November 2014. He was installed as Bishop of Lugazi on 3 January 2015 by Bishop Cyprian Kizito Lwanga Bishop of the Archdiocese of Kampala. He succeeded Bishop Emeritus Mathias Ssekamaanya, who retired, as the Ordinary of Lugazi Diocese.

== See also ==
- Uganda Martyrs
- Roman Catholicism in Uganda
- Matthias Ssekamaanya

== Succession table ==
Catholic Church titles
Preceded by Matthias Ssekamaanya (30 November 1996 - 4 November 2014)	Roman Catholic Diocese of Lugazi (since 4 November 2014)	Succeeded by (Incumbent)
Preceded by	Auxiliary Bishop of Kampala (2 January 1999 - 4 November 2014)	Succeeded by
