= Uganda Catholic Television =

Roman Catholic television station in Uganda

- Branding: UCTV
- Country: Uganda
- Availability: National
- Founded: February 10, 2020; 6 years ago
- Headquarters: Uganda Catholic Secretariat, Nsambya
- Owner: Uganda Episcopal Conference
- Launch date: June 3, 2023
- Official website: uctvuganda.org
- Language: English

Uganda Catholic Television (UCTV) is a Ugandan television station under the Uganda Episcopal Conference.

Uganda Catholic Television began test-transmitting in 2020 on Free-to-air (FTA) services. The Catholic television station is now on Zuku channel 74, where it broadcasts news, infotainment, evangelization, live papal events, and edutainment content.

== Background ==
The idea to establish UCTV was conceived by the Uganda Episcopal Conference in 2018. Operations started in 2020 but due to financial constraints and other factors, the channel did not commence regular programming and was testing its signal on free-to-air broadcasting primarily in the Kampala area until June 3, 2023, when it was launched.

The establishment of UCTV was made possible through funds collected from members and donations, with notable contributions from the bishops of Italy who supported the acquisition of essential equipment and other sources.

== Launch ==
The Uganda Catholic TV was officially launched during the Uganda Martyrs Day celebrations of 2023 by the Chairman of the Uganda Episcopal Conference, Rt. Rev. Joseph Anthony Zziwa.

== Operations ==
The television station's main studio is situated at the Catholic Secretariat in Nsambya and is supported by sub-stations in Mbarara, Tororo, Gulu, and Lira. These sub-stations gather local content from various regions throughout the country.

The TV combines both religious and secular programming.

== Programs ==
- Children's Liturgy
- Community Mass
- Prayers of Healing
- Moment of encounter
- UNCCLA Listens and Speaks
