= African College of Commerce and Technology =

College in Kabale Town, Uganda

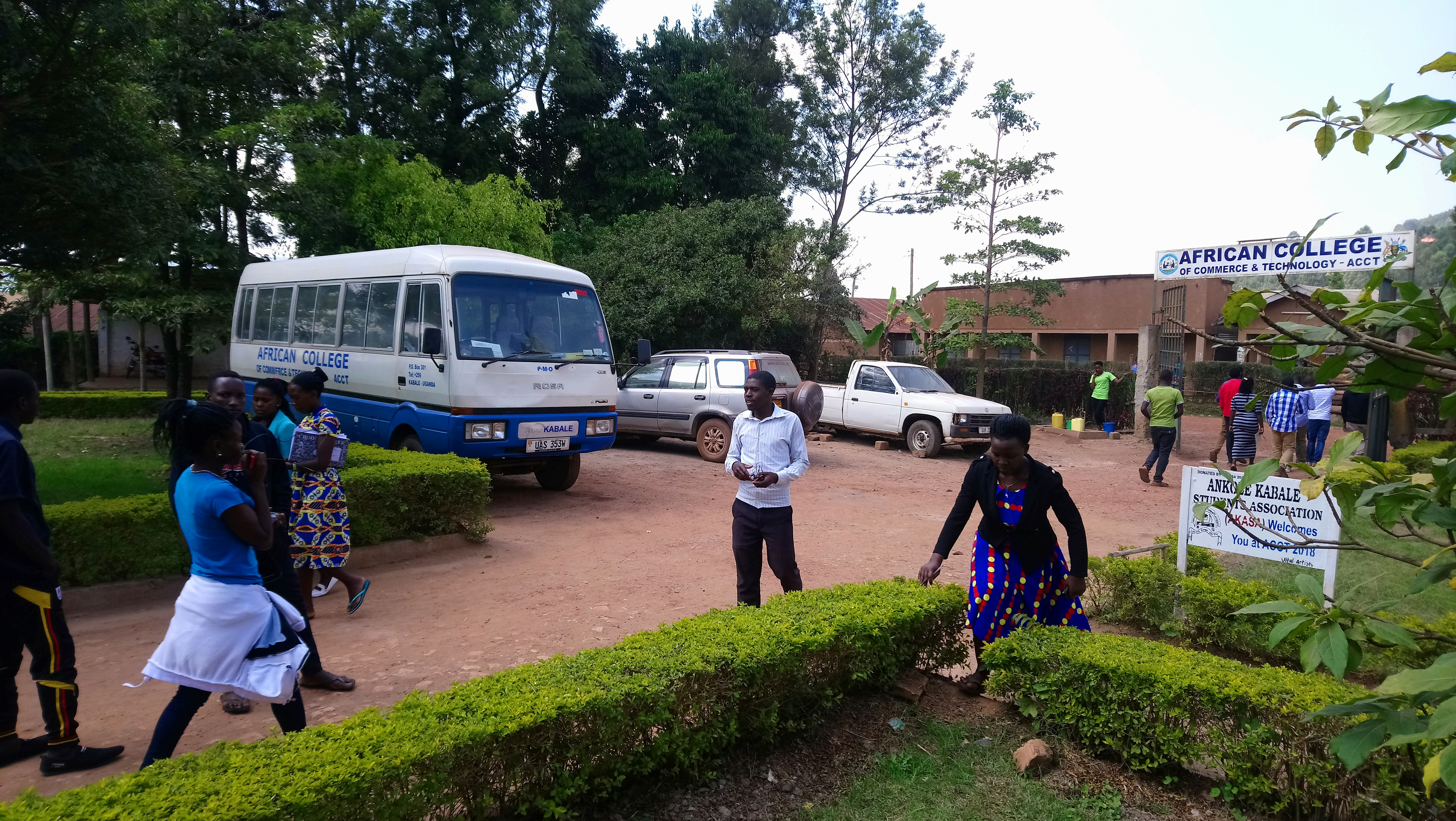
- Other names: ACCT Uganda
- Motto: Invest in skills
- Type: Private
- Established: April 14, 1986
- Founders: Ndemere Adrian
- Academic affiliations: Makerere University Business School (MUBS); Kyambogo University; Uganda Business and Technical Examinations Board (UBTEB); Directorate of Industrial Training (DIT)
- Chairman: Banugire Firimoon
- President: Mulenga Martin
- Vice-president: Alinda Kofudensi
- Principal: Tumusiime Andrew
- Director: Ndemere Adrian
- Academic staff: 50
- Administrative staff: 12
- Students: 8200+
- Location: Kabale, Uganda; 1°15′32.040″S 29°58′41.160″E
- Campus: Urban campus
- Website: acct.ac.ug

African College of Commerce and Technology (abbreviated ACCT) is a private tertiary educational institution focusing on business, management, entrepreneurship, technical, and information and communication technology courses located in Kabale District, Uganda. The programs ACCT offers are examined by different examination bodies in Uganda, like the Uganda Business and Technical Examinations Board (UBTEB). The college is both day and boarding, and students are of both genders.

== History ==
African College of Commerce and Technology was established and commissioned as a business education institution under the name African College of Commerce on 14 April 1986. It was registered and recognized by the Ministry of Education in Uganda in June 1986. The college had its first graduation ceremony in 1990.

=== Timeline ===
- 1990: First graduation ceremony
- 1992: Introduction of computer science courses
- 1994: Affiliation to Uganda National Examinations Board, now known as Uganda Business and Technical Examinations Board (UBTEB)
- 2003: Affiliation to Makerere University Business School
- 2005: The college received financial support from Germany to establish a campus, including buildings, computers, textbooks, and develop a human resource department
- 2007: ACCT wins the Bronze award Employer Of The Year 2006 by the Federation of Uganda Employers
- 2008: Accreditation by the Uganda National Council for Higher Education (NCHE) as a recognized institution of higher learning in Uganda
- 2014: Name change from African College of Commerce to African College of Commerce and Technology
- 2015: Affiliation with Kyambogo University for the Technical Teacher Training programs
- 2016: Cerebrated 30 years and 13th graduation on 15-04-2016
- 2018: Accredited by the Uganda Business and Technical Examinations Board for the Diploma in Engineering Programmes
- 2018: UBTEB harmonizes all the ACCT examination center No. BTV062
- 2018: Accredited by the Directorate of Industrial Training as a center for UVQF Assessments for levels 1, 2, 3, Modular assessment, and the assessment of Workers PAS
- 2018: Celebrated 32 years and graduated 671 former students on 25 August 2018
- 2020: Received support from the World Bank through the Private Sector Foundation Uganda under the Skills Development Facility to support the training of Internet of Things as an innovation, the first of its kind in Uganda
- 2020: Graduated 402 students during the 15th Graduation Ceremony on 30 and 31 October 2020

== Academic units ==
=== Faculty of Business and Management ===
The following Programmes are offered at the Faculty of Business and Management:

Diploma Programmes	Certificate Programmes
Accountancy and Finance	Accountancy and Finance
Business Administration	Business Administration
Business Computing	Business Management
Marketing and Sales Management	Entrepreneurship and Businesses Management
Micro-finance Management	Public Administration and Management
Public Administration and Management	Business Studies

=== Faculty of Vocational ===
The following Programmes are offered in at the Faculty of Vocational at the college:

Diploma Programmes	Certificate Programmes
Computing and Information Technology	Computing and Information Technology
Environmental Management	Journalism
Journalism	Library and Information Studies
Library and Information Management	Records Management
Records Management	Tourism and Hotel Management
Tourism and Hotel Management	Secretarial and Information Management
Secretarial and Office Administration	Hotel and Institutional Catering
	Tourism and Hospitality Management
	Cosmetology

=== Faculty of Engineering ===
The following Programmes are offered in the Faculty of Engineering at the college:

Diploma Programmes	Certificate Programmes
Building and Civil Engineering	Advanced Certificate in Plumbing
Computer Science and Electronics Engineering	Electronics Technology
Electrical Engineering	Machining and Fitting
Industrial Ceramics	Electrical Engineering
Lathe Turning and Shoe Making	Industrial Ceramics
Mechanical Engineering	Lather Turning and Shoe Making
Renewable Energies	Solar Energy
Tailoring, Fashion, and Design	Renewable Energies
Water Engineering	Tailoring, Fashion, and Design
Internet of Things	Welding and Fabrication
	Automotive Mechanics
	National Certificate in Building Construction
	Electrical Installation Systems and Maintenance
	Internet of Things

=== Faculty of Education ===
The college offers a Diploma in Instructor and Technical Teacher Education (DITTE) of Kyambogo University with the following specializations:

- Electrical Engineering
- Building and Civil Engineering
- Tailoring and Garment Design
- Agriculture
- Automotive Engineering
- Lather Turning and Shoe Making

== Notable alumni ==
- Andrew Taremwa Kamba
