= Enid Origumisiriza =

Ugandan politician

District Woman Representative for Kabale District
- Incumbent
- Assumed office 2026
- Constituency: Kabale District

Personal details
- Born: Kashumurizi, Kabale District, Uganda
- Party: National Resistance Movement (NRM)
- Education: Bishop Barham University; National Teachers’ College, Kabale; Kigezi High School; Bishop Kivigyere Girls’ School
- Occupation: Politician, Teacher
- Profession: Educator
- Known for: Anti‑poverty advocacy; community development

Enid Origumisiriza is a Ugandan politician. She is the district women's representative for Kabale District in the Parliament of Uganda. She won the seat in parliament in 2026 on the National Resistance Movement (NRM) at the 2026 Ugandan general elections. She is interested in serving her constituents to reduce poverty in her community. She won the NRM primary elections securing 53,713 votes, defeating Catherine Atwakiire Ndamira, who got 47,246 votes.

== Education and background ==
Enid Origumisiriza is a born of Kashumurizi village in Kabale district. She studied at Bishop Kivigyere Girls’ School. Later she joined Kigezi High School for Ordinary and Advance level studies and continued to National Teachers’ College, Kabale. Enid Origumisiriza graduated with a Bachelor's degree in education from Bishop Barham University. She worked at Kigezi High School as a teacher and senior woman teacher. She was also a leader even in her high school days, where she was a deputy head girl. At National Teachers’ College ,she was a Christian Union chairperson. Later in life, she led many women groups. But to engage in active politics, she started in 2019.

== See also ==
- Parliament of Uganda
- Sarah Achieng Opendi
- Idah Nantaba
- Rebecca Kadaga
