= Kabale =

Kabale City
- City
- Kabale City
- Nickname: Ka-Stone
- Location in Uganda
- Coordinates: 01°15′00″S 29°59′24″E
- Country: Uganda
- Region: Western Region of Uganda
- Sub-region: Kigezi sub-region
- District: Kabale District

Government
  - Mayor: Emmanuel Byamugisha Sentaro
  - MP: Andrew Aja Baryayanga, Municipality
  - MP: Wilfred Niwagaba, Ndorwa East
  - MP: David Bahati, Ndorwa West
  - MP: Enid Origumisiriza Atuheire, Woman MP
- Elevation: 6,600 ft (2,000 m)

Population (2024 Census)
  - Total: 64,695
- Climate: Cfb

Impression

Kabale City is a city in the Western Region of Uganda. It is the main city of Kabale District, and the district headquarters are located at Makanga hills.

It is sometimes nicknamed "Kastone" as in the local Rukiga language, a "kabale" is a small stone.

== Location ==
lake bunyonyi

Kabale city, largest city in Kigezi Region and second largest city in the Western Region of Uganda only behind Mbarara City, is located in the Kabale District of the Kigezi sub-region. It is about 142 kilometres (88 mi) southwest of Mbarara, the largest city in the Western Region of Uganda. This is approximately 410 kilometres (250 mi), by road, southwest of Kampala, Uganda's capital and largest city. The town lies 2,000 metres (6,600 ft) above sea level with the coordinates: 01 15 00S, 29 59 24E (Latitude:-1.2500; 29.9900).

== Climate ==
Kabale is known for its cool, cold, and often foggy climate, largely due to its high altitude and mountainous landscape. The area experiences pleasant temperatures compared with many other parts of Uganda, with mist and fog commonly occurring in the mornings and during cooler periods. Kabale is also well known for its beautiful scenery, including attractive sunsets over the hills and valleys, making the town and surrounding areas appealing for residents, visitors, and tourists.

Kabale is renowned for its cool, crisp, and often misty climate, a distinctive feature created by its high altitude and spectacular mountainous landscape. Early mornings are frequently wrapped in soft blankets of fog that drift across the hills and valleys, creating a calm and refreshing atmosphere.

Kabale is known for its relatively cool climate, green terraced hills and fresh mountain air, which distinguish it from many other parts of Uganda. In the evening, the setting sun often casts shades of orange, pink and gold across the sky, with the surrounding hills forming part of the view.

== Population ==
In 1969, the national census that year enumerated 18,234 people in Kabale. According to the national census of 1980, that population had grown to 121,469. In 1991, the census that year enumerated 129,246 inhabitants. In the 2002 national census, Kabale had 141,344 residents. The 2014 national census and household survey enumerated 249,186 people. In 2020, the Uganda Bureau of Statistics (UBOS) estimated the mid-year population if the town at 353,200. UBOS calculated that the population of Kabale city, grew at an average rate of 2.36 percent, annually, between 2014 and 2020.

Therefore, as of 2026, Kabale City can be described as an expanding urban centre with an estimated population of approximately 519,651 people.

== Economic activities ==
Kabale's economy is mainly driven by agriculture, trade, tourism, transport, and small-scale businesses. Agriculture is an important economic activity, with farmers producing crops such as Irish potatoes, vegetables, bananas, beans, and tea for both local consumption and commercial markets.

The City also serves as a major trading centre for agricultural products from the surrounding areas. Other activities include retail and wholesale businesses, restaurants, hotels, banking, transport services, construction, and various informal businesses. Tourism also contributes to the local economy because of Kabale's proximity to attractions such as Lake Bunyonyi, Bwindi Impenetrable National Park, and Mgahinga Gorilla National Park.

== Tourism City ==
Kabale and the wider Kigezi sub-region are rich in natural beauty and offer a variety of attractions for visitors. One of the most famous is Lake Bunyonyi, known for its numerous islands, scenic hills, cool climate, and spectacular views. It is often described as Uganda's deepest lake, with commonly cited estimates placing its maximum depth at around 900 feet (274 m), although the exact depth has been debated.

Other attractions include the beautiful terraced hills of Kigezi, Bwindi Impenetrable National Park, famous for mountain gorilla trekking, and Mgahinga Gorilla National Park, which offers gorilla trekking, golden monkey tracking, and spectacular volcanic mountain scenery.

Hotels

Visitors can also explore Lake Mutanda, volcanic landscapes, cultural communities, and scenic viewpoints around the region. Kabale and Kigezi also have a growing range of hotels, lodges, guesthouses, restaurants, and lakeside resorts, providing accommodation ranging from beautiful stays to more luxurious experiences.

== Points of interest ==
The other points of interest within the town limits or close to the edges of town include the following:

- headquarters of Kabale District Administration
- offices of Kabale City Council
- Kabale Regional Referral Hospital, a 250-bed public hospital administered by the Uganda Ministry of Health
- branch of the National Social Security Fund
- Kabale Currency Centre, a currency storage and processing facility owned and operated by the Bank of Uganda, Uganda's Central Bank
- Kabale University, a government university
- Kabale Airport, a civilian airport operated by Kabale Municipality
- Kabale Campus of Uganda Martyrs University
- Kabale Golf Course
- Rugarama Hospital 200 patient bed capacity Church of Uganda founded general Hospital
- Rushoroza Hospital - 200 Patients bed capacity, manageged by the Catholic Church
- Rushoroza Cathedral - seat of the Catholic diocese of Kabale, found in Kabale City
- Radio Maria Uganda - Kabale Station, located on Rushoroza Hill
- St Mary's College Rushoroza - Kabale, founded by the Catholic church
- St Paul's Seminary Rushoroza - founded by the Catholic church
- African College of Commerce and Technology, a private tertiary educational institution

== Impressions of Kabale ==
Kabale city Uganda.
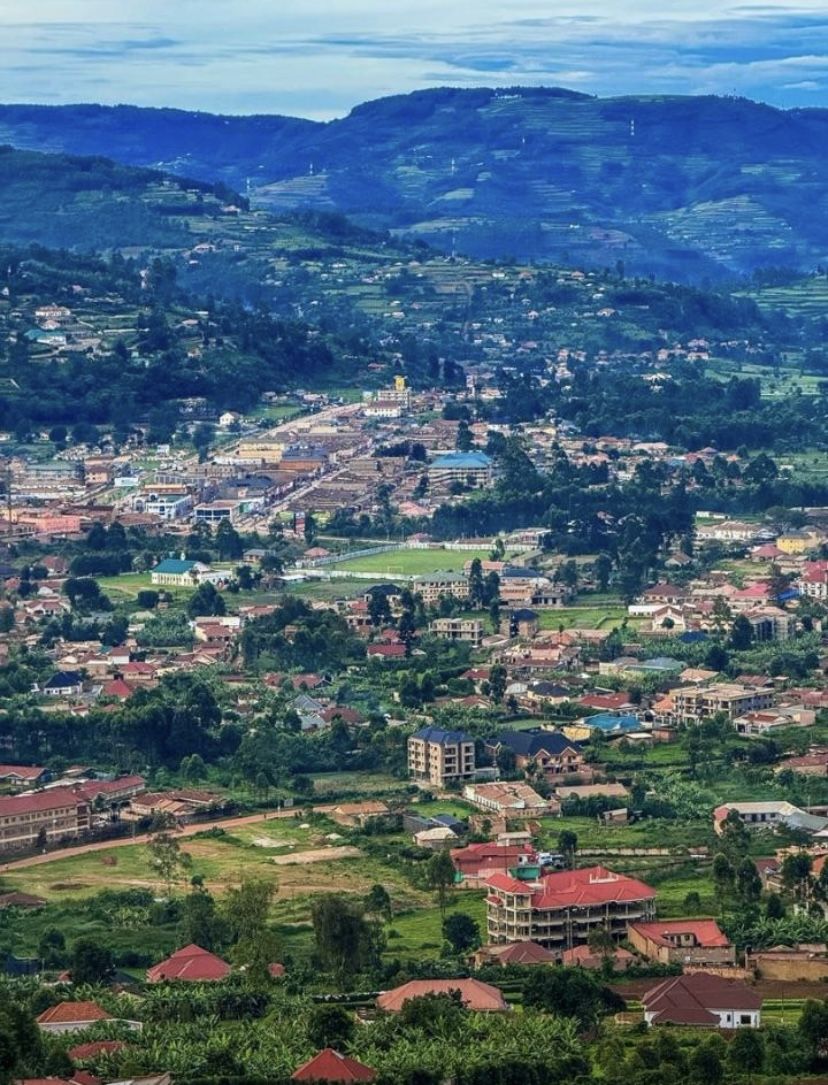
Kabale southern Division
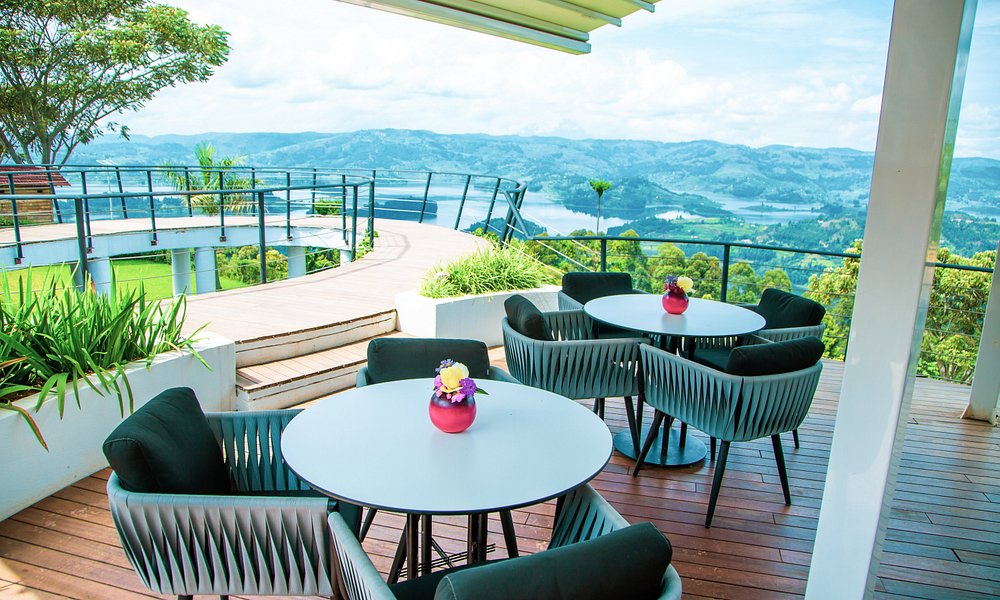
Kabale bunyonyi ends
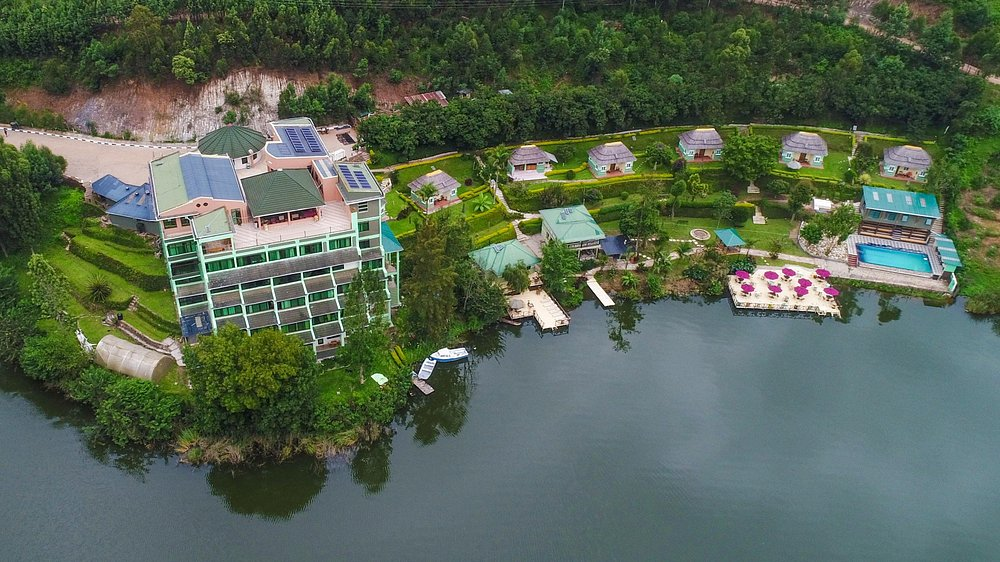
Hotels

== Notable people ==
- Augustus Nuwagaba, Social worker and academic
- Edith Mary Bataringaya, activist and politician
- Yvonne Mpambara, lawyer and politician
- Ruhakana Rugunda - Prime Minister of Republic of Uganda
- Callistus Rubaramira - Bishop of the Roman Catholic Diocese of Kabale
- Ezra Suruma - Economist & Academic

== See also ==
- Uganda Christian University
- List of cities and towns in Uganda
