= Diocese of Lugazi =

Diocese of the Catholic Church in Uganda

Coordinates: 00°22′12″N 32°55′40″E

Diocese of Lugazi Dioecesis Lugasiensis
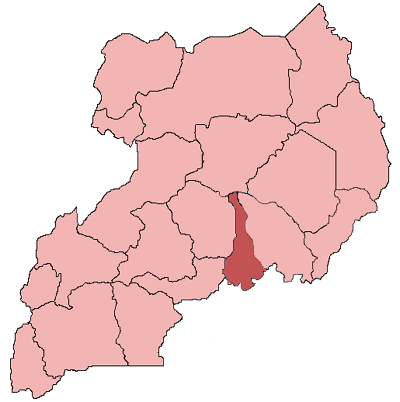
- Uganda - Diocesi di Lugazi

Location
- Country: Uganda
- Metropolitan: Kampala

Statistics
- Area: 4,594 km^{2} (1,774 sq mi)
- Population: Total; Catholics: (as of 2004); 1,150,000; 471,500 (41.0%)
- Parishes: 21
- Schools: 130 primary 27 secondary

Information
- Rite: Latin Rite

Current leadership
- Pope: Leo XIV
- Bishop: Christopher Kakooza
- Vicar General: Richard Kayondo
- Bishops emeritus: Matthias Ssekamaanya

The Roman Catholic Diocese of Lugazi (Latin: Lugasien(sis)) is a diocese located in the city of Lugazi in the ecclesiastical province of Kampala in Uganda.

== History ==
- November 30, 1996: Established as Diocese of Lugazi from the Metropolitan Archdiocese of Kampala.

== Current bishop ==
Christopher Kakooza was born at Nsambya Hospital on 15 November 1952. His parents lived at Lusaze, Kyaddondo County, in the Archdiocese of Kampala. He was ordained priest on 3 June 1983 at St Mbaaga's Major Seminary, Ggaba, as one of the pioneer group of the seminary and appointed auxiliary bishop on 30 January 1999. His episcopal ordination took place on 17 April 1999 at Rubaga Cathedral. He was appointed as the bishop of the Roman Catholic Diocese of Lugazi, on 4 November 2014, by Pope Francis, replacing Bishop Matthias Ssekamanya, who retired. He was consecrated as bishop of the Diocese of Lugazi on Saturday 3 January 2015, by Cyprian Kizito Lwanga, the Archbishop of Kampala.

== Leadership ==
- Bishops of Lugazi (Roman rite)
  - Bishop Matthias Ssekamanya (23 February 1997 – 3 January 2015)
  - Bishop Christopher Kakooza (since 3 January 2015)

== See also ==
- Roman Catholicism in Uganda
- Mount Saint Mary's College Namagunga

== Sources ==
- Catholic-hierarchy
