= John Baptist Kakubi =

Ugandan Catholic prelate (1929 - 2016)

The Most Reverend John Baptist Kakubi
- Bishop Emeritus of Mbarara, Uganda (Deceased)
- Church: Catholic Church
- Archdiocese: Roman Catholic Archdiocese of Mbarara
- See: Mbarara
- Appointed: 26 June 1969
- Installed: 1 August 1969
- Term ended: 23 November 1991
- Predecessor: Jean-Marie-Gaëtan Ogez
- Successor: Paul Kamuza Bakyenga

Orders
- Ordination: 11 June 1960
- Consecration: 1 August 1969 by Pope Paul VI
- Rank: Bishop

Personal details
- Born: John Baptist Kakubi; September 23, 1929 Kyanyanda, Diocese of Mbarara, Isingiro District, Uganda
- Died: 11 February 2016 (aged 86) International Hospital Kampala, Kampala, Uganda
- Motto: “Lord you are my shield”

Styles of John Baptist Kakubi
- Reference style: Your Grace; The Most Reverend
- Spoken style: His Grace
- Religious style: Bishop

John Baptist Kakubi (23 September 1929 - 11 February 2016) was a Ugandan Roman Catholic prelate. He served as the Bishop of the Roman Catholic Diocese of Mbarara, in Uganda from 1969 until his resignation in 1991. He died on 11 February 2016 as the Bishop Emeritus of Mbarara, Uganda. He was 86 years old.

== Early life ==
He was born on 23 September 1929 at Kyanyanda Village, Rugaaga sub-county, Diocese of Mbarara, in Isingiro District, Uganda. His parents were Rafaili Ziriddamu and Kandida Kiremire. He started primary school in 1939 in his home area, graduating in 1944. He studied philosophy and theology before he was ordained a priest in 1960.

He joined St. Francis Xavier Kitabi Minor Seminary in Bushenyi District, Archdiocese of Mbarara, from 1944 until 1950. Out of the 24 seminarians in his class only four (John Baptist Kakubi included) completed the seven year course. He then transferred to Katigondo National Major Seminary in Kalungu District, where he studied from 1951 until 1956. He continued with his studies at St Edmund's College, Ware in Ware, Hertfordshire, England. He attended a course in Catholic Social Studies at Saint Peter Claver Institute from 1960 until 1961.

== Priest ==
He was ordained to the priesthood, on 11 June 1960, for what is now the Roman Catholic Archdiocese of Mbarara, Uganda. He served in that capacity until 26 June 1969. His ordination took place at Westminster Cathedral in London by the hands of William Cardinal Godfrey of the Archdiocese of Westminster. Father Kakubi celebrated his first Mass at St Patrick's Church, Soho Square in Soho Square.

After he returned to Uganda, he lectured at Katigondo Major Seminary from 1963 until 1964. He then worked as Diocesan Secretary for Education for Mbarara and Kabale from 1964 until 1966.

== Bishop ==
On 26 June 1969 Pope Paul VI appointed him Bishop of what at that time was the Roman Catholic Diocese of Mbarara, being the first indigenous Ugandan to be appointed bishop there.

He was consecrated at Kololo Ceremonial Grounds, in Kololo, Kampala, in the Archdiocese of Kampala on 1 August 1969 by the hands of Pope Paul VI assisted by Archbishop Sergio Pignedoli, Titular Archbishop of Iconium and Archbishop Emmanuel Kiwanuka Nsubuga, Archbishop of Kampala.

== Resignation ==
He resigned as bishop of Mbarara on 23 November 1991 and was succeeded that same day by Paul Kamuza Bakyenga, previously Coadjutor Bishop of Mbarara, Uganda and later Archbishop, when the diocese was elevated archdiocese in 1999. After his resignation in 1991, he relocated to Ibanda Priest's House, "a house for priests and those that are retired and sick", in Ibanda, where he lived from March until his death July 2023.

== Illness and death ==
For a period of about two years before his death, Bishop Kakubi was diagnosed with high blood pressure and diabetes mellitus. In the Winter of 2015/2016 he was admitted to International Hospital Kampala in Kampala for evaluation and management. He died there on 11 February 2016. He was 86 years of age. He was buried as he willed, at Saint Joseph's Chapel on Nyamitanga Hill, in Mbarara City on Saturday 13 February 2016.

== Legacy ==
He is credited with the founding of many schools including Maryhill High School a Catholic Church-affiliated girls' boarding school for O-level (grades 8-11) and A-level (grades 12-13). The school is located on Nyamitanga Hill in Mbarara City.

== See also ==
- Catholic Church in Uganda

== Succession table ==
Catholic Church titles
Preceded by Jean-Marie-Gaëtan Ogez (11 December 1956 - 25 November 1968)	Bishop of Mbarara; 26 June 1969 - 23 November 1991	Succeeded by Paul Kamuza Bakyenga
