= Barnabas R. Halem 'Imana =

Ugandan priest

Barnabas Rugwizangonga Halem ’Imana
- Bishop Emeritus of Kabale
- Church: Roman Catholic Church
- Archdiocese: Roman Catholic Archdiocese of Mbarara
- See: Roman Catholic Diocese of Kabale
- Appointed: 29 May 1969
- Term ended: 15 July 1994
- Predecessor: None
- Successor: Robert Marie Gay

Orders
- Ordination: 7 December 1958
- Consecration: 1 August 1969 by Pope Paul VI
- Rank: Bishop

Personal details
- Born: Barnabas Rugwizangonga Halem ’Imana; 1 January 1929; Rulangara, Kisoro District, Uganda
- Died: 3 January 2016 (aged 87); Nsambya Hospital, Kampala, Uganda

Barnabas Rugwizangonga Halem ’Imana (1929–3 January 2016), was a Ugandan Roman Catholic priest who served as Bishop of the Roman Catholic Diocese of Kabale from 1969 until 1994.

== Background and priesthood ==
Halem ’Imana was born in Rulangara, in present-day Kisoro District, in the Western Region of Uganda, in 1929. He was ordained a priest on 7 December 1958 at Mbarara. He served as a priest at Mbarara until 1 February 1966, when he was transferred to Kabale. He served as a priest at Kabale until 29 May 1969, when he was appointed bishop.

== As bishop ==
He was appointed Bishop of Kabale on 29 May 1969. He was ordained bishop 1 August 1969 by Pope Paul VI, assisted by Archbishop Sergio Pignedoli†, Titular Archbishop of Iconium and Archbishop Emmanuel Kiwanuka Nsubuga†, Archbishop of Kampala.

He resigned as bishop on 15 July 1994. He died on 3 January 2016 at age 87 years.

== See also ==
- Uganda Martyrs
- Roman Catholicism in Uganda

== Succession table ==
Preceded by None	Bishop of Kabale; 1969–1994	Succeeded by Robert Marie Gay (1996–2003)
