= Diocese of Kabale =

Diocese of the Catholic Church in Uganda

Coordinates: 1.2823°S 29.9905°E

Diocese of Kabale Dioecesis Kabalenus
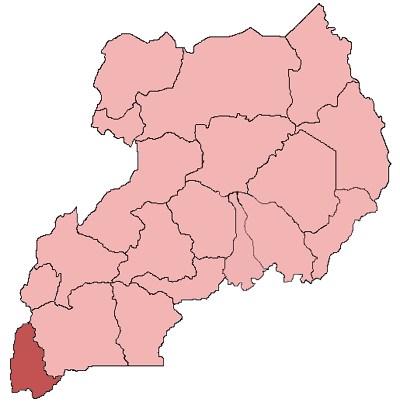
- Roman Catholic Diocese of Kabale

Location
- Country: Uganda
- Metropolitan: Mbarara

Statistics
- Area: 5,330 km^{2} (2,060 sq mi)
- Population: Total; Catholics: (as of 2004); 1,541,176; 693,530 (45.0%)

Information
- Rite: Latin Rite

Current leadership
- Pope: Leo XIV
- Bishop: Callistus Rubaramira

Diocese of Kabale Dioecesis Kabalensis
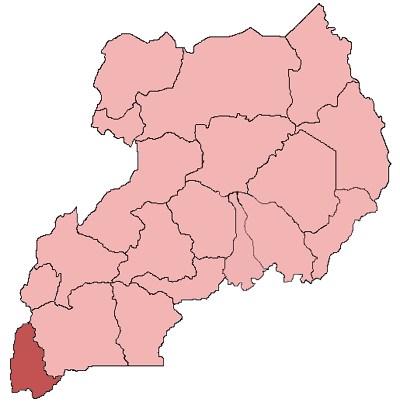
- Roman Catholic Diocese of Kabale

Location
- Country: Uganda
- Territory: Kabale District, Kisoro District, Kanungu District, Rukungiri District
- Ecclesiastical province: Mbarara
- Metropolitan: Mbarara

Statistics
- Area: 5,330 km^{2} (2,060 sq mi)
- Population: Total; Catholics: (as of 2023); 2,010,000; 989,100 (49.2%)
- Parishes: 37

Information
- Denomination: Roman Catholic Church
- Sui iuris church: Latin Church
- Rite: Roman Rite
- Established: April 17, 1966
- Cathedral: Cathedral of Christ the King, Kabale

Current leadership
- Pope: Leo XIV
- Bishop: Bonaventure Bosco Gubazire
- Metropolitan Archbishop: Lambert Bainomugisha

Website
- Official website

The Roman Catholic Diocese of Kabale (Latin: Kabalen(us)) is a diocese located in the city of Kabale in the ecclesiastical province of Mbarara in Uganda.

== History ==
- February 1, 1966: Established as Diocese of Kabale from Diocese of Mbarara

== Leadership ==
- Bishops of Kabale (Roman rite)
  - Bishop Barnabas R. Halem ’Imana (1969.05.29 – 1994.07.15)
  - Bishop Robert Marie Gay, M. Afr. (1996.01.11 – 2003.03.15)
  - Bishop Callistus Rubaramira (since 2003.03.15)
- Bonaventure Bosco Gubazire (2026–present)

== See also ==
- Roman Catholicism in Uganda
- Kabale

== Sources ==
- catholic-hierarchy
