= Paul Kamuza Bakyenga =

Ugandan Catholic archbishop (1944–2023)

His Excellency Paul Kamuza Bakyenga
- Archbishop Emeritus of Mbarara (Deceased)
- Archdiocese: Roman Catholic Archdiocese of Mbarara
- Diocese: Mbarara
- Appointed: 2 January 1999
- Installed: 2 January 1999
- Term ended: 25 April 2020
- Predecessor: First
- Successor: Lambert Bainomugisha
- Previous posts: Coadjutor Bishop of Mbarara (1989–1991); Bishop of Mbarara (1991–1999)

Orders
- Ordination: 11 July 1971
- Consecration: 24 June 1989 by John Baptist Kakubi

Personal details
- Born: June 30, 1944 Bumbaire, Igara County, Bushenyi District, Protectorate of Uganda
- Died: 18 July 2023 (aged 79) St. Francis Hospital, Nsambya, in Kampala, Uganda

Paul Kamuza Bakyenga (30 June 1944 – 18 July 2023) was a Ugandan Roman Catholic priest, who was the Archbishop of the Archdiocese of Mbarara, from 2 January 1999. Pope Francis accepted his resignation on 25 April 2020 and appointed Auxiliary Bishop Lambert Bainomugisha as the Archbishop of Mbarara, Uganda.

== Early life and priesthood ==
Paul Kamuza Bakyenga was born on 30 June 1944, in Bumbaire Village, Igara sub-county, in present-day Bushenyi District in the Western Region of Uganda. He attended pre-primary school in the church building at Bweeza, Bushenyi District. He went on to attend Ibaare Primary School, before he joined Ibanda Preparatory Seminary from 1958 until 1960. In 1961, he joined Kitabi Seminary, where he graduated with a High School Diploma.

== Expulsion from the seminary ==
He was admitted to Bukalasa Minor Seminary, in present-day Kalungu District  for his A-Level studies but he did not complete. He was expelled, along with others, for “indiscipline”.[3]

After teaching briefly at Rushoroza Seminary, in Kabale District, he was then admitted at Katigondo Major Seminary, in Kalungu District to study philosophy but abandoned the course after two years. At this point, Bishop John Baptist Kakubi of Mbarara, sent him to study at St Andrews College in Scotland, where he obtained a degree in Theology.

Bakyenga was ordained a priest on 11 July 1971 at Mbarara at the age of 27. He served as priest in the Roman Catholic Archdiocese of Mbarara, until 6 March 1989.

== Career ==
Bakyenga dedicated his life to a distinguished career in the clergy, serving as a priest for 52 years and as a bishop for 34 years. After his ordination, he was appointed Chaplain of Ntare Secondary School for two years. He was Rector of Kitabi Minor Seminary from 1973- 1974.

== As bishop ==
Bakyenga was appointed Coadjutor Bishop of Mbarara, Uganda on 6 March 1989. He was consecrated as bishop on 24 June 1989 at Mbarara by Bishop John Baptist Kakubi, Bishop of Mbarara, assisted by Bishop Adrian Kivumbi Ddungu, Bishop of Masaka and Bishop Serapio Bwemi Magambo, Bishop of Fort Portal.

On 23 November 1991, he succeeded as bishop of Mbarara, replacing the late Bishop John Baptist Kakubi, who resigned. He was appointed Archbishop of Mbarara on 2 January 1999 and retired by resignation in April 2020.

== Death ==
Bakyenga died at St. Francis Hospital, Nsambya in Kampala on 18 July 2023, at the age of 79. He was buried "inside the church on the right-hand side of the Altar" of the Cathedral of Our Lady of Perpetual Help at Nyamitanga Hill, the seat of the Archdiocese of Mbarara.

== See also ==
- Uganda Martyrs
- Holy Innocents Children's Hospital
- Roman Catholicism in Uganda
- Augustine Kasujja

Catholic Church titles
Preceded by First	Archbishop of Mbarara; 1999–2020	Succeeded by Lambert Bainomugisha
Preceded by John Baptist Kakubi	Bishop of Mbarara; 1991–1999	Succeeded by Position abolished
