= Archdiocese of Mbarara =

Catholic archdiocese in Uganda

Coordinates: 0.6240°S 30.6424°E

Archdiocese of Mbarara Archidioecesis Mbararaensis

Location
- Country: Uganda
- Deaneries: 8

Statistics
- Area: 10,980 km^{2} (4,240 sq mi)
- Population: Total; Catholics: 3,650,770; 1,278,440 (35%)
- Parishes: 68

Information
- Denomination: Catholicism
- Sui iuris church: Latin Church
- Rite: Roman
- Established: May 28, 1934
- Cathedral: Santa Maria Nyamitanga
- Secular priests: 165
- Metropolitan Archbishop: Lambert Bainomugisha
- Suffragans: Fort Portal, Hoima, Kabale, Kasese

Map
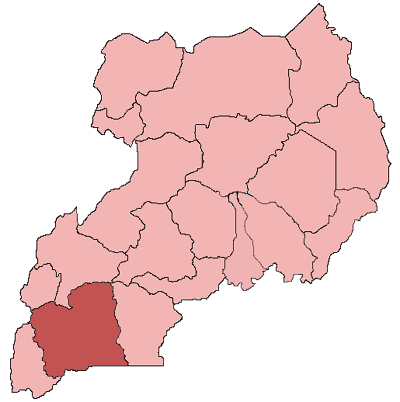
- Location of the Archdiocese of Mbarara within Uganda

The Roman Catholic Archdiocese of Mbarara (Archidioecesis Mbararaensis) in Uganda covers an area of 10,980 km^{2} in southwestern Uganda. As of 2003, of the 2.2 million citizens in the area 856,168 are members of the Catholic Church. The archdiocese is subdivided into 25 parishes, and has 114 priests altogether. The archdiocese is the metropolitan for the dioceses of:

- (a) Hoima
- (b) Fort Portal
- (c) Kasese
- (d) Kabale

The cathedral is the Cathedral of Our Lady of Perpetual Help in Mbarara.

== History ==
The archdiocese dates back to the Vicariate Apostolic of Ruwenzori, which was erected on May 28, 1934 by splitting the Vicariate Apostolic of Uganda. On March 25, 1953 it was elevated to a diocese and renamed after its principal town Mbarara. 1961 territory was lost to the newly erected diocese of Fort Portal, and again in 1966 to the diocese of Kabale. On January 2, 1999 the diocese was elevated to an archdiocese. Before being an archdiocese the diocese was a suffragan diocese of the Archdiocese of Kampala.

== Bishops ==
Vicar Apostolic of Ruwenzori

- Bishop François-Xavier Lacoursière Missionaries of Africa (28 May 1934 - 25 March 1953 see below)

Bishops of Mbarara

- Bishop François-Xavier Lacoursière Missionaries of Africa (see above 25 March 1953 - 20 April 1956)
- Bishop Jean-Marie Gaëtan Ogez, Missionaries of Africa (11 December 1956 - 25 November 1968)
- Bishop John Baptist Kakubi (26 June 1969 - 23 November 1991)
- Bishop Paul Kamuza Bakyenga (23 November 1991 – 2 January 1999 see below)

Archbishops of Mbarara

- Archbishop Paul Kamuza Bakyenga (see above 2 January 1999 – 25 April 2020), promoted as Archbishop on 2 January 1999, when Mbarara became metropolitan archdiocese.
- Archbishop Lambert Bainomugisha (25 April 2020 – Present), formerly served as Auxiliary Bishop of the Archdiocese since 2005.

=== Coadjutor Bishop ===
- Paul Kamuza Bakyenga (1989-1991)

=== Auxiliary Bishop ===
- Lambert Bainomugisha (2005-2020), appointed Archbishop here

== See also ==
- Roman Catholicism in Uganda
- Mbarara

== Sources ==
- catholic-hierarchy
