= List of Africans venerated in the Catholic Church =

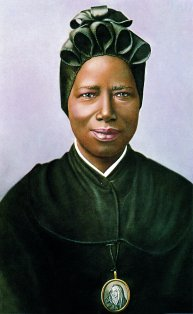
Josephine Bakhita, Sudan-born saint

The Catholic Church recognizes some deceased Catholics as saints, beati, venerabili, and servants of God. Some of these individuals are associated with the continent of Africa.

== Before the Arab Conquest ==
In the first centuries of the Catholic Church, Africa produced many of her leading lights. The Catholic presence in Africa was weakened by the schism following the Council of Chalcedon which resulted in the separation between the Catholic and Coptic Orthodox Church, and even more so by the rise of Islam. Following the Arab conquest of northern Africa, the Catholic Church was largely absent from the continent before modern times, although the Coptic, and later Ethiopic, Orthodox Churches remained. The following are some of the notable saints from the first to seventh centuries, though it is a very incomplete list.

=== Popes ===
Three of the early popes were either from Africa themselves or children of African immigrants to Rome. All three were from this time period and are traditionally considered saints. They are:

- Pope Victor I (r. 189–199)
- Pope Miltiades (r. 311–314)
- Pope Gelasius I (r. 492–496)

=== Doctors ===
Three of the thirty-five Doctors of the Church were from Africa, all of them from this time period. They are:

- Augustine of Hippo, from present-day Algeria
- Athanasius of Alexandria, from present-day Egypt
- Cyril of Alexandria, from present-day Egypt

=== Writers and theologians ===
Many of the early writers and theologians had connections with Africa. A partial list would include:

- Mark the Evangelist, author of the Gospel that bears his name and founder of the Patriarchate of Alexandria
- Apollos, may be author of the Epistle to Hebrews
- Ammon the Abbot
- Anatolius of Laodicea, of Egypt
- Aurelius, of Tunisia
- Clement of Alexandria, author of several works, whose cult in the Latin Rite has been suppressed
- Cyprian of Carthage, author of several works
- Didymus the Blind
- Fulgentius of Ruspe, of Tunisia
- Isidore of Pelusium, author of several letters
- Optatus, author against Donatism
- Pierius
- Possidius, author of a life of Augustine of Hippo
- Quodvultdeus

=== Others ===
- Abraham the Poor, of Egypt
- Abraham of Alexandria, of Egypt
- Achillas of Alexandria, of Egypt
- Adrian of Canterbury, of North Africa
- Aizan and Sazan, of Ethiopia
- Alexander of Alexandria, of Egypt
- Alypius of Thagaste, of Algeria
- Ammon the Martyr and companions, of Egypt
- Anastasius Sinaita, of Egypt
- Anthony the Great, of Egypt
- Apollonia of Alexandria and companions, of Egypt
- Arcadius of Mauretania, of Algeria
- Arethas, Ruma and companions, of Ethiopia
- Armogastes and Saturus, of Tunisia
- Athanasia and Andronicus, of Egypt
- Bessarion of Egypt
- Caecilius, spiritual father to Cyprian of Carthage, of Tunisia
- Cassian of Tangier, of Morocco
- Catherine of Alexandria, of Egypt
- Cerbonius, of North Africa
- Crispina, of Algeria
- Cucuphas, of Tunisia
- Damian of Alexandria, of Egypt
- Demetrius of Alexandria, of Egypt
- Deogratias of Carthage, of Tunisia
- Denise, Dativa, Leontia, Tertius, Emilianus, Boniface, Majoricus, and Servus, of Tunisia
- Dionysius of Alexandria, of Egypt
- Donatian and companions, of North Africa
- Epenetus of Carthage, of Tunisia
- Eugenius of Carthage, of Tunisia
- Fabius, of Algeria
- Felix of Abbir, Cyprian of Unizzibir, and companions, of Libya
- Felix of Hadrumetum, of Tunisia
- Felix of Thibiuca, of Tunisia
- Frumentius, of Ethiopia
- Gaudiosus of Naples, of Tunisia
- Horsiesius, of Egypt
- Isidore of Alexandria, of Egypt
- Isidore of Chios, of Egypt
- Isidore of Scété, of Egypt
- John of Egypt, of Egypt
- Julia of Corsica, of Tunisia
- Kaleb of Axum (Elesbaan), of Ethiopia
- Lucius of Cyrene, of Libya
- Marciana of Mauretania, of Algeria
- Macarius of Alexandria, of Egypt
- Macarius of Egypt, of Egypt
- Marcellinus of Carthage, of Tunisia
- Marcellinus, Vincent, and Domninus, of North Africa
- Marcellus of Tangier, of Morocco
- Marianus, James, and companions, of Algeria
- The Martyrs of the Plague of Cyprian in Alexandria, Egypt
- The Martyrs of Utica, of Tunisia
- Mary of Egypt, of Egypt
- Maurice and the Theban Legion, of Egypt
- Maximilian of Tebessa, in Algeria
- Matthew I of Alexandria, of Egypt
- Monica of Hippo, of Algeria
- Moses the Black, of Egypt
- Nabor and Felix, of Morocco
- Nemesian and companions, of Algeria
- Nemesion and companions, of Egypt
- Onuphrius, of Egypt
- Pachomius the Great, founder of monasticism, of Egypt
- Pambo, of Egypt
- Pantaenus, of Egypt
- Paphnutius the Ascetic, of Egypt
- Paphnutius of Thebes, of Egypt
- Paul of Thebes, of Egypt
- Perpetua, Felicity, and companions, in Tunisia
- Peter of Alexandria, of Egypt
- Poemon, of Egypt
- Quintian of Rodez, of Tunisia
- Restituta, of Tunisia
- Saizana, of Ethiopia
- Sarmata, of Egypt
- Saturninus, Dativus, Victoria, and Companions, of Tunisia
- Serapion of Thmuis, of Egypt
- Shenoute, of Egypt
- Simon of Cyrene, of Libya
- Speratus and companions, of Tunisia
- Thaïs, of Egypt
- Theodorus of Tabennese, of Egypt
- Timothy the Reader and his wife Maura, of Egypt
- Typasius, of Algeria
- Valerian of Abbenza, of Tunisia
- Victor Maurus, of Morocco
- Victor of Utica, of Tunisia
- Victorian, Frumentius and Companions, of Tunisia
- Zeno of Verona, of Algeria

== Modern times ==
It would be difficult to say who the first saint to be associated with Africa after the Arab conquest would be. Francis of Assisi famously went on a mission to Egypt in 1219. Berardo, Ottone, Pietro, Accursio, Adiuto, martyrs in Morocco (1220). Daniel Fasanella, Samuele, Angelo, Leone, Niccolò, Ugolino, Domno, martyrs in Morocco (1227). Louis IX of France died in Tunisia en route from the Holy Land in 1270. But after the canonization of saints came to be reserved to the papacy around AD 1000, and especially after the establishment of the Congregation of Rites in 1588, the list of official saints with African connections is more clear.

=== List of saints ===
The following is the list of saints, including the year in which they were canonized and the country or countries with which they are associated.

- Serapion of Algiers, Mercedarian religious and martyr (1728, Algeria)
- Anthony Mary Claret, Claretian bishop (1950, Canary Islands)
- The Martyrs of Uganda (1964, Uganda). They include:
  - Charles Lwanga
  - Matthias Muluumba
  - Andrew Kaggwa
  - Athanasius Bazzekuketta
  - Gonzaga Goonza
  - Noe Mawaggali
  - Luke Baanabakiintu
  - James Buzaabalyaawo
  - Gyaviira Musoke
  - Ambrosio Kibuuka
  - Anatoli Kiriggwajjo
  - Achilleus Kewanuka
  - Kizito
  - Mbaga Tuziinde
  - Mugagga Lubowa
  - Joseph Mukasa
  - Adolphus Ludigo
  - Bruno Seruunkuuma
  - John Mary Muzeeyi
  - Denis Ssebuggwawo Wasswa
  - Ponsiano Ngoondwe
  - Mukasa Kiriwawaanvu
- Justin de Jacobis, Lazarist Bishop (1975, Ethiopia and Eritrea)
- Josephine Bakhita, Canossian religious (2000, Sudan)
- Peter of Saint Joseph Betancur, layman (2002, Canary Islands)
- Daniel Comboni, bishop (2003, Sudan)
- Jacques Berthieu, Jesuit priest and martyr (2012, Madagascar)
- José de Anchieta, Jesuit priest (2014, Canary Islands)
- 21 Coptic Martyrs of Libya, (2015, Libya) commemorated in the Roman Martyrology
- Charles de Foucauld, priest and martyr (2022, Algeria)

=== List of blesseds ===
- Benedict Daswa, layman and martyr (South Africa)
- Agathange de Vendome, Capuchin priest and martyr (Ethiopia)
- Isidore Bakanja, layman and martyr (Democratic Republic of Congo)
- Jan Beyzym, Jesuit priest (Madagascar)
- Lucien Botovasoa, layman and martyr (Madagascar)
- Floribert Bwana Chui, layman and martyr (Democratic Republic of Congo)
- Cassien de Nantes, Capuchin priest and martyr (Ethiopia)
- Lorenza Diaz Bolanos, Daughter of Charity martyred in Spain (Canary Islands)
- Michele Fasoli, Franciscan priest and martyr (Ethiopia)
- Charles de Foucauld, religious and martyr (Algeria)
- Joseph Gérard, Missionary Oblate of Mary Immaculate (Lesotho)
- Jildo Irwa, layman and martyr (Uganda)
- Francisca de Paula de Jesus, aka Nhá Chica, laywoman (Brazil)
- Jacques-Désiré Laval, Spiritan priest (Mauritius)
- Martyrs of Algeria, Trappists and martyrs (Algeria)
- Samuele Marzorati, Franciscan priest and martyr (Ethiopia)
- Eliza Liduina Meneguzzi, Salesian sister (Ethiopia)
- Ghebre Michael, priest and martyr (Ethiopia)
- Marie-Clémentine Anuarite Nengapeta, Holy Family sister and martyr (Democratic Republic of Congo)
- Daudi Okelo, layman and martyr (Uganda)
- Raphael Rafiringa, De La Salle brother (Madagascar)
- Victoire Rasoamanarivo, laywoman (Madagascar)
- Jean-Bernard Rousseau, De La Salle brother (Reunion)
- Leonella Sgorbati, Consolata Missionary sister and martyr (Somalia)
- Francesco Spoto, Missionary Servant of the Poor priest and martyr (Democratic Republic of Congo)
- Irene Stefani, Consolata Missionary sister (Kenya)
- Cyprian Michael Iwene Tansi, Cistercian priest (Nigeria)
- Maria Caterina Troiani, Franciscan sister (Egypt)
- Francisco de Paula Victor, Priest (Brazil)
- Liberat Weiss, Franciscan priest and martyr (Ethiopia)
- Francesco Zirano, Franciscan priest and martyr (Algeria)

=== List of venerables ===
- Zeinab Alif, Poor Clare sister (Sudan)
- Jerzy Ciesielski, layman (Egypt)
- Felix Mary Ghebreamlak, Cistercian priest (Eritrea)
- Edel Quinn, laywoman (Kenya)
- Maria Teresa Scandola, Comboni sister (South Sudan)
- Mary Jane Wilson, Franciscan sister (Madeira)
- Luigi Lo Verde, professed cleric of the Conventual Franciscans (Tunisia)
- Martyrs of Kikwit, Sisters of the Poor and martyrs (Democratic Republic of Congo)
  - Luigia Rosina Rondi, S.d.P.I.P.
  - Alessandra Ghilardi, S.d.P.I.P.
  - Anna Maria Sorti, S.d.P.I.P.
  - Teresa Belleri, S.d.P.I.P.
  - Celeste Maria Ossoli, S.d.P.I.P.
  - Maria Rosa Zorza, S.d.P.I.P.

=== List of Servants of God ===
- John Bradburne, layperson of the Archdiocese of Harare; member of the Secular Franciscans; martyr (Zimbabwe)
- Andrés de Oviedo and 8 companions from the Jesuits of Ethiopia (Ethiopia)
  - Andrés de Oviedo
  - François Abraham de Georgiis
  - Gaspar Paes
  - João Pereira
  - Apolinar de Almeida
  - Giacinto Franceschi
  - Francisco Rodrigues
  - Luis Cardeira
  - Bruno Bruni
- Teresa Chikaba, Catholic nun (Ghana)
- Peter Porekuu Dery, Archbishop of Tamale (Ghana)
- Bernardin Gantin, Dean of the College of Cardinals (Benin)
- Stéphanos II Ghattas, cardinal (Egypt)
- Mariano Gichohi and 20 Companions, martyrs under the Mau Mau (Kenya)
- Marianno Wachira and 26 Companions (d. 1952–1955), laypeople from the Archdioceses of Nyeri and Nairobi along with the Dioceses of Murang’a and Meru; Catechumens; professed religious of the Consolata Missionary Sisters and the Sisters of Mary Immaculate of Nyeri; martyrs (Kenya)
- Daniel George Hyams and Domitilla Maria Rota Hyams, married laypersons of the Archdiocese of Johannesburg (South Africa)
- Michel Kayoya and 43 Companions, martyrs (Burundi)
- Bernardo de Monroy, John de Avila, and John de Palacio, Trinitarian priests and martyrs (Algeria)
- Vivian Uchechi Ogu, child of the Diocese of Mbaise; martyr (Nigeria)
- Maurice Michael Otunga, cardinal (Kenya)
- Cyprien and Daphrose Rugamba and six companions, martyrs (Rwanda)
- Bernadeta Mbawala, nun (Tanzania)
- Julius Kambarage Nyerere, first president of Tanzania
- Mario Bortoletto, priest of the Diocese of Treviso; Fidei Donum Missionary in the Diocese of Ebolowa; associate of the Pontifical Institute for Foreign Missions (Cameroon)
- Luisa Mabalane Mafo and 22 Lay Companions from the Catechetical Center of Guiua, married catechists, catechumens, young laypersons and children of the Diocese of Imhanbane; martyrs (Mozambique)
- Sergio Sorgon (Sergio of Saint Joseph) (1938–1985), professed priest of the Discalced Carmelites (Madagascar)
- Teresa Kearney (Mary Kevin) (1875–1957), founder of the Little Sisters of Saint Francis and the Franciscan Missionary Sisters for Africa (Uganda)
- Manuel Costa de los Ríos (prob. 1604–1686), layperson of the Archdiocese of Mercedes-Luján, longtime custodian of Our Lady of Luján in Argentina (Angola)
- Christophe Munzihirwa Mwene Ngabo (1926–1996), professed priest of the Jesuits; Archbishop of Bukavu (Democratic Republic of Congo)
- Jeremy Joyner White, British layperson of the Personal Prelature of the Holy Cross and Opus Dei (Nigeria)
- Aloÿs Kobès, professed priest of the Congregation of the Holy Spirit (Spiritians); apostolic vicar of Senegambia; founder of the Daughters of the Holy Heart of Mary and the Brothers of Saint Joseph (Senegal)
- Floribert Bwana Chui bin Kositi (1981–2007), layperson of the Archdiocese of Goma; member of the Saint Egidio Community; martyr (Democratic Republic of Congo)
- Declan O'Toole (1971–2002), priest of the Mill Hill Missionaries; martyr (Uganda)
- Giosuè dei Cas (1880–1932), professed religious of the Comboni Missionaries of the Heart of Jesus (South Sudan)
- Manuel Armindo de Lima and 3 Companions (Maria Adriano Abílio, Maria do Carmo Bartolomeu Simões, Joveta Paulino) (d. 1982), priest of the Missionary Society of the Good News; laypersons of the Diocese of Viana; postulant of the Mercedarian Sisters of Charity; catechist (Angola)
- Gabriel Gonsum Ganaka (1937–1999), Archbishop of Jos (Nigeria)
- Göbou Yaza (d. 1928?), young layperson of the Diocese of N’Zérékoré; catechumen; martyr (Guinea)
- Franziska May (Reinolda) (1901–1981), professed religious of the Missionary Benedictine Sisters of Tutzing (South Africa)
- Robert Naoussi (ca. 1940–1970), layperson of the Archdiocese of Douala (Cameroon)
- Alexandre Toé (1967–1996), professed priest of the Camillians (Burkina Faso)
- Aloysius Ngobya (1896–1986), priest of the Masaka Diocese (Uganda)
- Amedeo Byabali (1908–1979), nun of the Daughters of Mary, Masaka. (Uganda)
- Angelo Graziani, professed priest, Capuchin Franciscans (Angola)
- Henri de Solages, priest and apostolic prefect of Bourbon (Madagascar)
- Eugenio Mazzini (Ethiopia)
- Camillo Scarpa (Ethiopia)
- Pietro Griso (Ethiopia)
- Quinto Gardetto (Ethiopia)
- Eliodora Zottig (Ethiopia)
- Alfredo de Lai (Ethiopia)
- Giovanni Prato (Ethiopia)
- Weldemariam Tesfaghiorghis (Ethiopia)
- Andeberhan Ghebreamlak (Ethiopia)
- Franco Ricci (Ethiopia)
- Joseph Ignatius Shanahan (Kenya)

=== Other proposed causes ===
Others have been proposed for beatification, and may have active groups supporting their causes. These include:

- Anna Ali, religious in the order of The Most Holy Eucharist and reported mystic. (Kenya) The bishop of the Catholic Diocese of Eldoret has appointed a task force to investigate the life of Anna Ali. Hundreds of pilgrims visit her burial place every year to commemorate the nun who is reported to have received messages from Jesus for 25 years and to have photographed him,
- Salvatore Colombo, Somalia,
- Pietro Turati, Somalia,
- Sean Devereux, Somalia,
- Maria Cristina Luinetti, Somalia,
- Graziella Fumagalli, Somalia,
- Annalena Tonelli, Somalia,
- Isidore de Souza, Benin, Archbishop
- fr:Gilbert Dagnon, Benin, Priest and Musician
- fr:Thomas Mouléro Djogbenou, Benin, First native born priest in West Africa
- Mother Julia de Souza Nobre, Benin, Founder of the Oblate Catechists of the Little Servants to the Poor
- Florent Nascimento, Benin, Priest
- Gabriel Kiti, Benin, Priest
- Andre Afounana, Benin, Priest
- Jean Pliya, Benin, Layperson

== See also ==
- Blessed
- Congregation for the Causes of Saints
- List of Algerian saints
- List of Canarian saints
- List of Central American and Caribbean Saints
- List of Christian saints of Algeria
- List of American saints and beatified people
- List of Mexican Saints
- List of Saints from Oceania
- Roman Catholic saints of Canada
- Roman Catholicism in Africa
- Saint
- Servant of God
- Venerable
