= Fr. Mapeera and Brother Amansi monument in Uganda =

Coordinates: 0°01′40″N 32°26′10″E

Amansi and Mapeera Monument
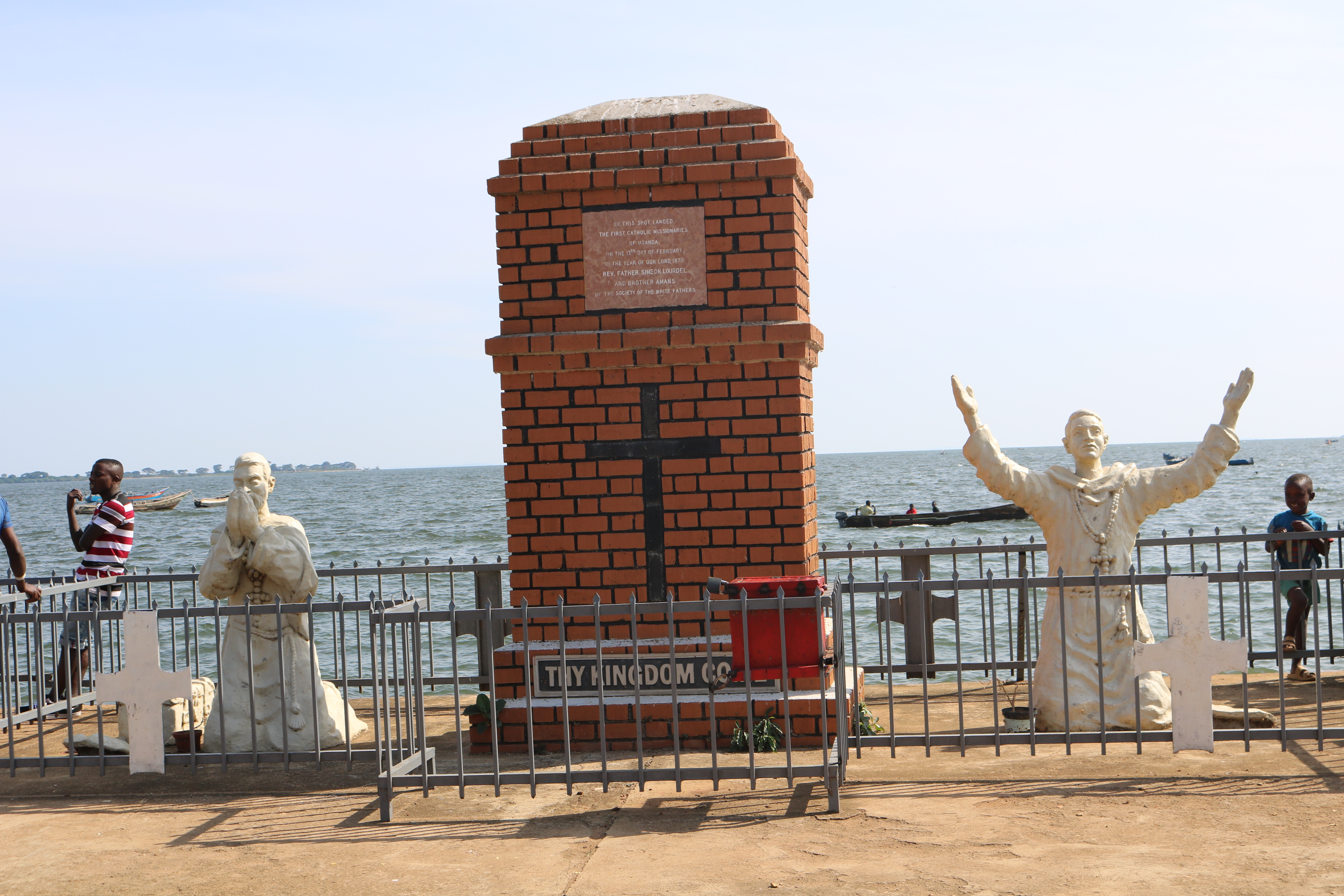
- Fr. Mapeera (on the left) and Brother Amansi (on the right) monuments
- Interactive map of Amansi and Mapeera Monument
- Location: Kigungu Landing site, Wakiso District

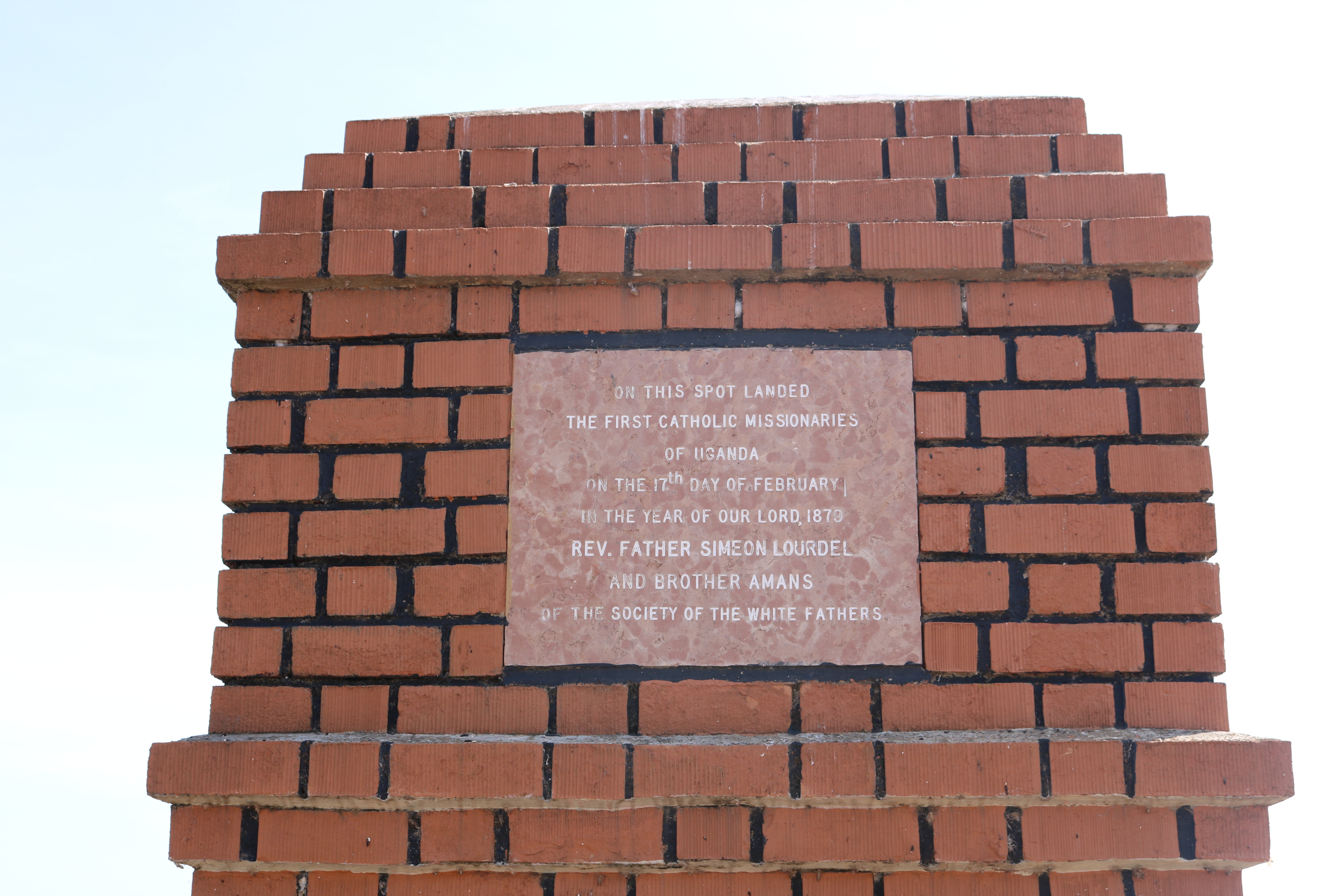
Words of the Mapeera and Amansi monument

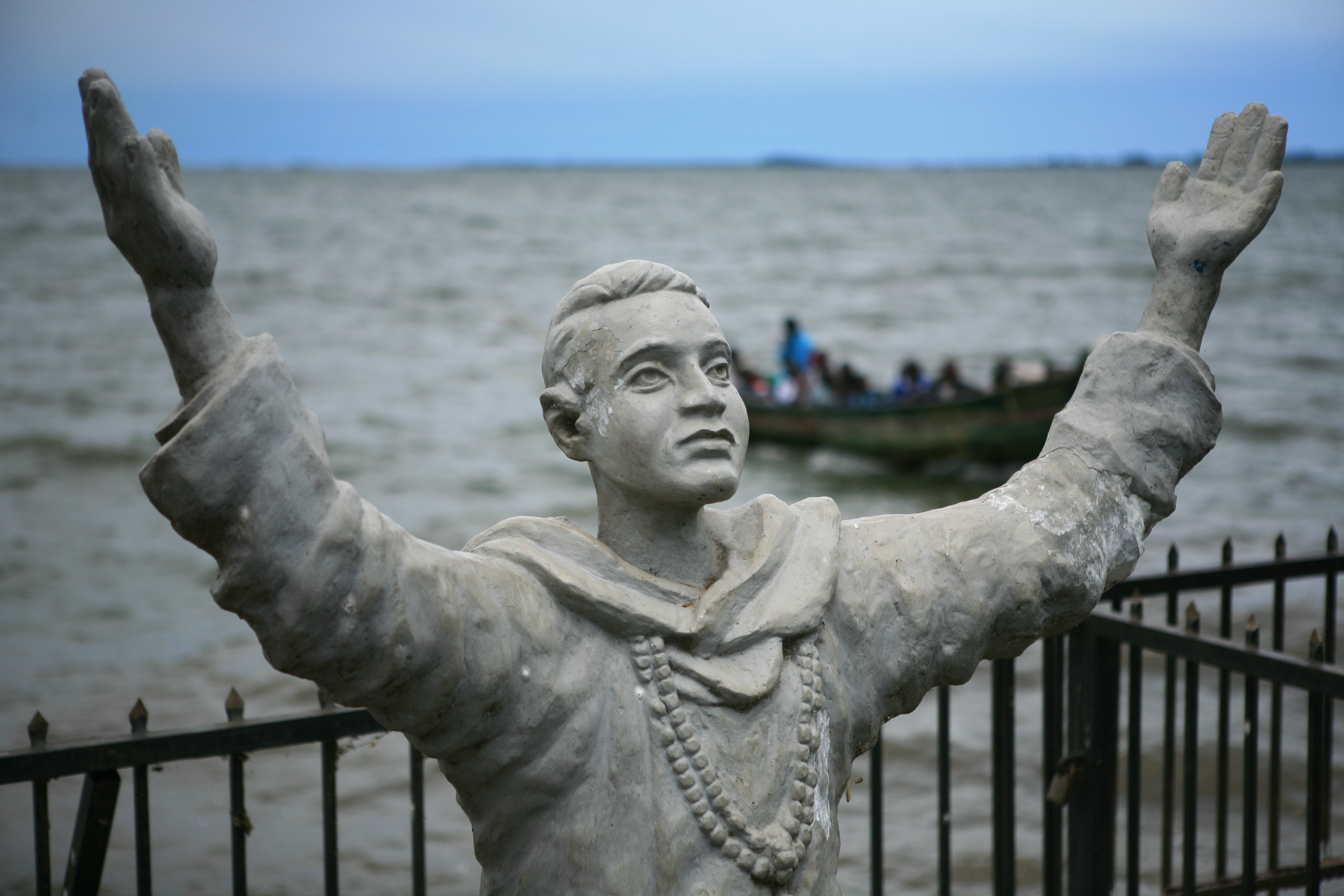
Monument of Fr. Mapeera

The Fr. Mapeera and Brother Amansi monument in Entebbe, Uganda, was constructed by the Missionaries of Africa in the memory of Rev. Fr. Siméon Lourdel Marpel (aka Mapeera) and Brother Amans, who were among the pioneer White Fathers who came to Uganda on 17 February 1879 and spread Christianity in Uganda. The monument depicts two missionaries dressed in white and kneeling while praying. It is located at the Kigungu landing site by Kigungu Catholic Church, behind Entebbe International Airport in Wakiso District.

== See also ==
- Mapeera church
- Uganda martyrs
- Namugongo
