= Knights of Saint Mulumba =

Nigerian Catholic organisation

The Order of the Knights of St. Mulumba is a Nigerian Catholic organisation. It was founded in Onitsha, Anambra State on 14 June 1953 by Fr. Abraham Ojefua. The order had its 70th anniversary in 2022.

The order is named after St. Matiya Mulumba, one of the Ugandan Martyrs.

== History ==
The Knights of St. Mulumba was founded on 14 June 1953 by Fr. Abraham Ojefua at the instance of the Catholic Bishops' Conference of Nigeria (CBCN) with the sole aim of "counteracting the harm done by many secret societies to the church and to arrest the efflux of the Christian enlightened members into those harmful secret groups" and "to bring Catholics together in a fraternal association for the good and progress of the church, the welfare of its clergy, wellbeing of members of the Order in particular and Nigeria".

On 27 November 2021 during the 42nd Supreme Council Convention of the knight in Asaba, Delta State, Charles Mbelede was elected as the Supreme Knight of the order.

== Activities ==
The order is a spiritual community that follows the line of the Catholic Church and its magisterium. The order's purpose, according to their website, includes: complete trust in God; working for a just society, attending to the poor and needy, promoting order and discipline, effective Catholic life, and commitment to ecumenism.

In 2014, the order held a vigil themed "The Family: Fountain of Life" in Maryland, Lagos, where they opposed abortion.

== Views ==
On 31 March 2024 during a conference in Lagos, the order criticised and listed the dangers of drug abuse and abortion. During the 45th Supreme Council Convention of the order in Calabar, Cross River State on 29 November 2024, the order condemned the outdated and overcrowded prisons in Nigeria, stating that the president should "implement significant reforms in correctional facilities".

While inspired by the long culture of knights carrying arms to defend the church, the order has stated that they would not bear arms to defend themselves against attacks by bandits, terrorists, etc., "but [will] continue to use advocacy to sensitise the general public and government". In 2018 during the 38th Annual Convention of the organisation in Lagos, with the theme, "Family Values, Human Rights and the Challenges of Modernisation in Nigeria", the order asked Nigerians especially the Catholic congregation to embrace love, honesty and build strong family values.
