= Saint Achilles =

Saint Achilles may refer to:

- Saint Achilles, one of the duo of martyr saints Saints Nereus and Achilleus
- Achilles of Larissa (died 330)
- Achilleus Kewanuka (1869–1886)
