= Nabulagala Mapeera church =

Mapeera Church
- Mapeera Nabulagala Church
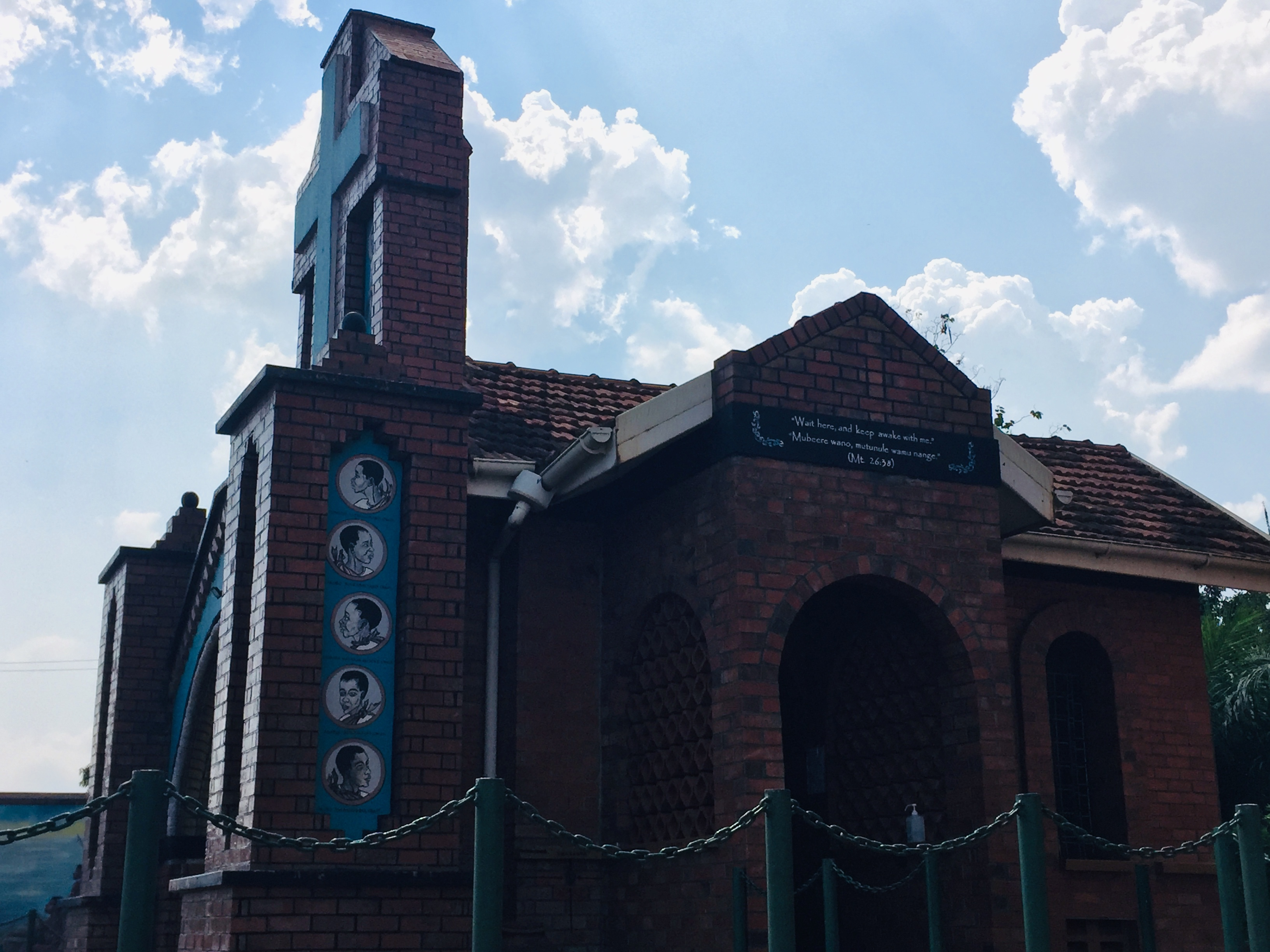
- Nabulagala Mapeera church in Lusaze Lubya
- Mapeera Church
- Location: Kigungu landing site, Uganda
- Address: Lusaze Lubya
- Country: Uganda
- Religious institute: Catholic Church

History
- Founded: 1879
- Founder: White fathers aka The Missionaries of Africa

Architecture
- Years built: 1879

Specifications
- Capacity: 200 members

Administration
- Archdiocese: Kampala

Mapeera Church alias (Nabulagala Mapeera church, St. John the Baptist Mapeera-Nabulagala Catholic Parish) was the first constructed catholic church in Uganda in 1879 by the White Fathers. It is located in Lusaze Lubya in Nabulagala, Kigungu Landing site behind Entebbe Airport in Uganda.

== It is where; ==
- The first ever Catholic mass of Latin Rite was held in Uganda.
- The first Catholic converts in Buganda were baptised in 1880, of which four of them are among the Uganda Martyrs.
- The dedication of the missionary activity of the White fathers and "Uganda to Mary" on 2 July 1879 was hosted.
- The catholic pioneer of the missionary society of White Fathers were first buried before they were exhumed.

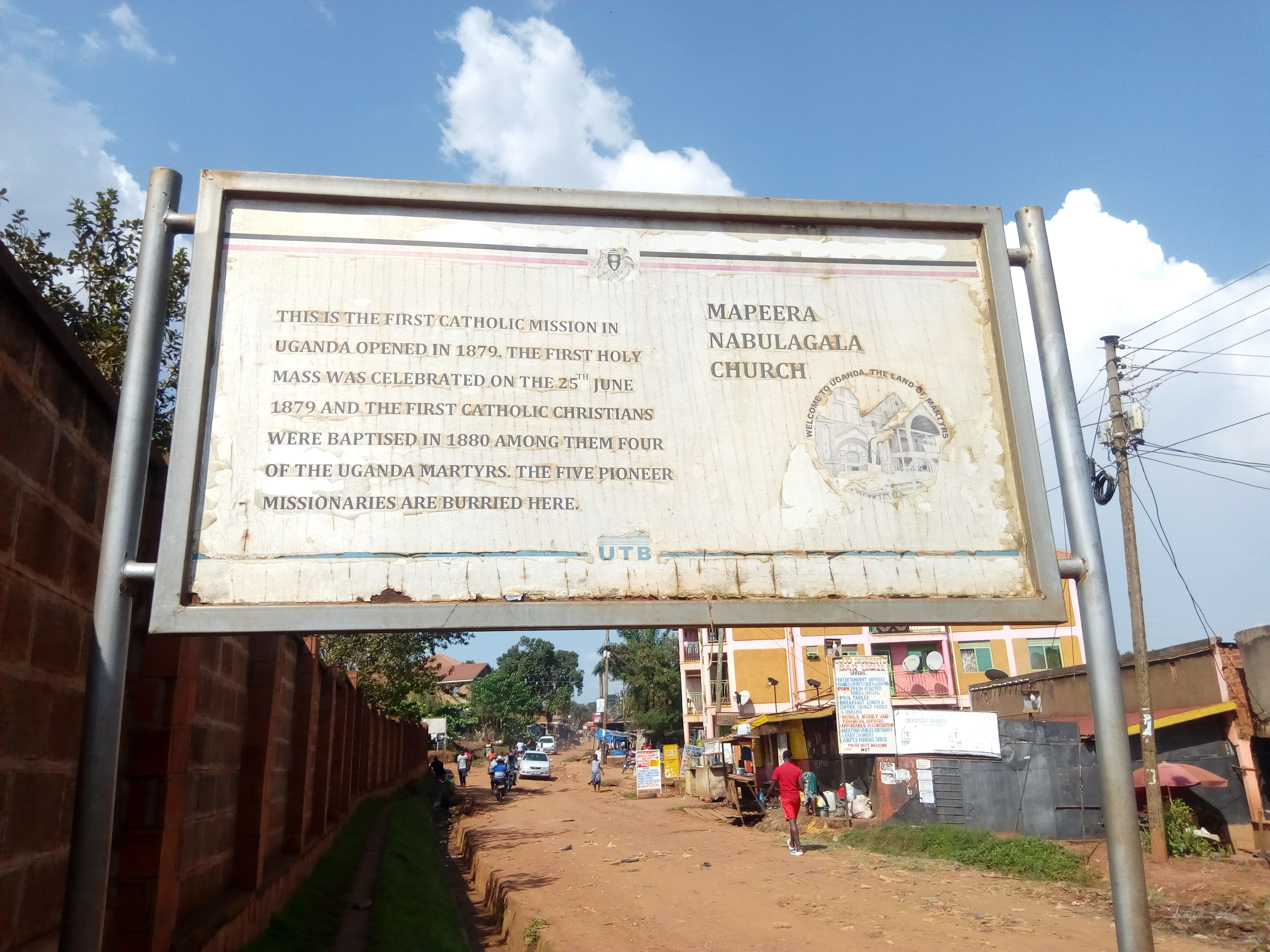
Nabulagala Mapeera church post

== History ==
The church is historical in the Catholic church because it was were the first mission the missionaries established in Uganda on arrival in 1879 and where the first mass was celebrated in the country.

== The arrival of the White Fathers ==
The missionaries belonged to the Catholic missionary society of White Fathers which is also known as Religious Institute of the Missionaries of Africa. They arrived in Africa on 15 November 1878 and the missionaries included; Pere (Fr.) Siméon Lourdel Marpel (aka Mapeera and also misspelt as Simon Laudel Mapeera), brother Delmas Amans (aka Amansi), Léone Livinhac, Ludoic Girault and Léon Barbot.

Their arrival in Uganda almost turned sour because they were almost denied entry due to the religious rivalry of the time.

When Mapeera and Amans wanted to come to Uganda, Alexander Mackay, an Anglican missionary who had arrived earlier in Uganda as the French visitors was consulted by Kabaka Mutesa I.

On 21 February 1879, a Ugandan muslim family of the late Amir Sekikkubo in Kitebe village, Rubaga Division, Kampala District welcomed, hosted Fr. Mapeera and Brother Amansi in to their home. Sekikkubo took the visitors to the Kabaka who instructed him that he should keep the visitors for 15 days until the Lukiiko determined their fate. Sekikkubo constructed a hut for them to stay in until they met Kabaka Muteesa I who offered Mapeera and Amansi land of about two miles in Nabulagala on which they constructed the Nabulagala Mapeera catholic church in Kitebe Village in Rubaga Division.

On 11 April 1879, the Kabaka Muteesa I gave Amansi a fleet of 24 canoes to go and fetch the other missionaries that included Léon Livinhac, Girault and Barbot.

=== The first Ugandan Catholic Baptism ===
Mapeera church was where the first baptism in the Buganda region took place on February 17, 1879. Among those who were first baptised by Msgr. Léon Livinhac in Uganda included; Paul Nalubandwa (aka Paolo Nlubanwa), Peter Kyonooneka Ddamulira (aka Petro Ddamulira), Joseph Lwanga (aka as Yosefu Lwanga) and Leon Kaddu. They also received their first holy communion and confirmation the next day. Fr. Mapeera baptised Andrew Kaggwa and Joseph Mukasa Balikuddembe on 30 April 1882. Fr. Ludovic Girault baptised Mathias Mulumba and Lukka Baanabakintu on 28 May 1882. Local chiefs including Luka Banabakinti and Matia Kalemba were also baptised.

=== Construction of the mosque ===
In 1980, Emmanuel Cardinal Nsubuga built a mosque for the family of Amir Sekikkubo in memory of Amir Sekikkubo who offered land to the pioneers of the catholic missionaries in Uganda and the mosque still stands to date and is being used by the public.

=== Construction of a bigger church ===
St. John the Baptist, Mapeera-Nabulagala church with a capacity of 1000 members was constructed in Rubaga Division using the contributions from the White Fathers and Catholics in Uganda and diaspora at the same spot where Mapeera and Amansi built their first mission station. It was consecrated by Dr. Cyprian Kizito Lwanga on 25 June 2016.

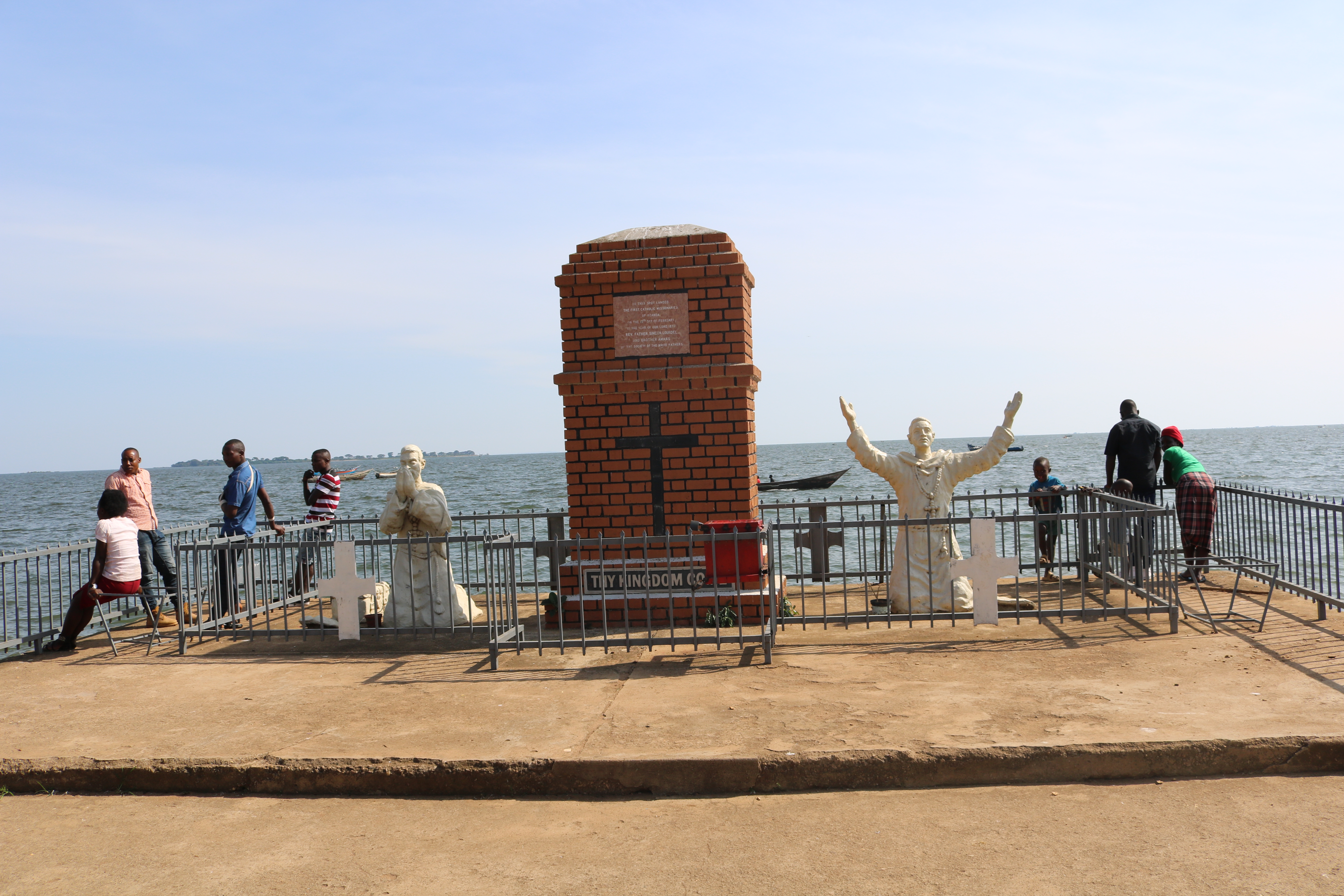
Fr. Mapeera (on the left) and Amansi (on the right) monument was constructed by the white fathers

=== The Fr. Mapeera and Brother Amansi monument ===
A monument was constructed by the Missionaries of Africa at Kyettale at Kigungu landing site in Entebbe Municipality Mapeera and Amansi arrived at on 17 February 1879.

== See also ==
- Uganda Martyrs
- Rubaga Cathedral
- Henry Streicher
- Missionary Sisters of Our Lady of Africa
- Charles Lavigerie
- The Missionaries of Africa
- White Fathers
- White Sisters of our Lady of Africa
- Joseph Mukasa Balikuddembe
- Catholic Church in Uganda
- Missionary Sisters of Our Lady of Africa
- List of national cultural sites in Central Region, Uganda
