= Joseph Kyagambiddwa =

- Born: 1914; Kaloddo, Masaka, Uganda
- Died: 1989 (aged 74–75)
- Burial place: Buloddo, Masaka, Uganda
- Other name: Joseph Kyagambiddwa Kaccumu
- Citizenship: Ugandan
- Education: St Henry's College Kitovu; Katigondo National Major Seminary; Makerere University; Catholic University of America; Xavier University; Manhattanville College
- Occupations: Composer; Musicologist; Music teacher; Choral conductor; Writer
- Employers: Kyambogo National Teachers College; Nkozi Teachers Training College; Busuubizi Teachers Training College
- Known for: African Music from the Source of the Nile; Uganda Martyrs' Oratorio
- Notable work: African Music from the Source of the Nile; Uganda Martyrs' Oratorio

Joseph Kyagambiddwa also known as Joseph Kyagambiddwa Kaccumu was a Ugandan composer, musicologist, music teacher, choral conductor and writer.

== Early life and education background ==
Kyagambiddwa was born in 1914 in Kaloddo, Masaka. He attended Bukulula Primary School, followed by St Henry's College Kitovu and Katigondo National Major Seminary but he later left the seminary and did not become a priest.

After leaving the seminary, Kyagambiddwa was sent by Archbishop Joseph Kiwanuka to Makerere University to study music. He later pursued further musical studies in the United States at the Catholic University of America. He also attended Xavier University in New Orleans and Manhattanville College in New York for advanced musical studies.

== Career ==
After returning to Uganda, Kyagambiddwa worked as a music teacher at institutions including the then Kyambogo National Teachers College, Nkozi Teachers Training College and Busuubizi Teachers Training College.

== Music research and publications ==
Kyagambiddwa was a researcher and writer on African music. In 1955, he published African Music from the Source of the Nile, which documented aspects of Ganda musical traditions and included musical transcriptions.

== Compositions ==
Kyagambiddwa composed the Uganda Martyrs' Oratorio, a collection of 22 compositions about the Uganda Martyrs. During the canonisation of the Uganda Martyrs at St Peter's Basilica in Rome on 18 October 1964, he was responsible for arranging and composing music for the occasion.

He composed,

- Karoli Lwanga Wuuno Omulwanyi
- Kizito Omuto Ye Wange
- Abagalagala B'embuuza
- Mulinnya Lya Patri
- Lwaali Lukulu
- Ye Mmanyi Nze
- Ali Waggulu Eyantonda Nnyini Buyinza
- Mbuuza Abataka B'e Buyudaaya

== Death ==
Kyagambiddwa died in 1989 and was buried at Buloddo in Masaka.

== See also ==
- Aloysius Ngobya
- Joseph Anthony Zziwa
- Expedito Magembe
- James Kabuye
