= Ambrosio Kibuuka =

Ugandan Roman Catholic martyr

Saint Ambrosio Kibuuka
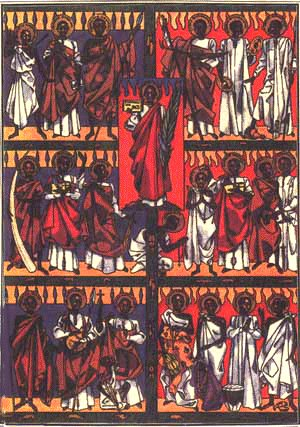
- Ambrosio Kibuuka and his companions

Martyr
- Born: 1868; Buganda, Uganda
- Died: June 3, 1886; Namugongo, Uganda
- Venerated in: Catholic Church
- Beatified: 1920 by Pope Benedict XV
- Canonized: October 18, 1964 by Pope Paul VI
- Major shrine: Basilica Church of the Uganda Martyrs, Namugongo
- Feast: June 3
- Patronage: Societies, including Scouts, Guides, Young Christian Workers, Xaverians and TCW

Ambrosio Kibuuka (1868 – June 3, 1886) aka (Ambrose Kibuuka Katekamu, Kateka Mulundaggana), was a Ugandan Catholic martyr killed for his faith around 1886. He was born in Buganda. He was one of many Christians put to death by King Mwanga II between 1885 and 1887. His day of martyrdom was June 3, when he was burned alive, and when he is remembered as one of the Martyrs of Uganda's feast day.

Ambrosio Kibuuka, was one of the 22 Catholic and 23 Anglican Ugandan martyrs who were put to death for their Christian faith by Mwanga II of Buganda between 1885 and 1887.

== Life ==
He was born at Butuzzaliiso Ssingo around 1868. His father was Kisuule Balamaze and his mother was Wampera, the only boy who survived for the other boys died soon after birth. His father was an official of the King’s Band known as “Mujaguzo” very much loved his son whom he named Katikamu and Mulundaggana.

At the age of fifteen, Kibuuka was brought to the royal palace to serve as a page for Kabaka Mwanga II. He was known for being social, kind, cheerful, and talented in games, able to work for long hours without fatigue. In the palace, he and his distant cousin Achilles Kiwanuka were entrusted to Joseph Mukasa Balikuddembe, the leader of the Christian pages, who later entrusted them to Charles Lwanga when Joseph Mukasa Balikuddembe was killed.

Kibuuka became an ardent catechumen (one preparing for baptism) and was baptized a Catholic by the missionary Père Siméon Lourdel (Mapeera) on November 16, 1885, the day after Joseph Mukasa's martyrdom.

When Kabaka Mwanga II initiated a severe persecution of Christians, Kibuuka was among those arrested on May 26, 1886. He and his companions were marched to Namugongo, the execution site, where they were imprisoned for about a week. On June 3, 1886 (the Feast of the Ascension), at about 17 or 18 years of age, he was wrapped in a reed mat with others and burned alive on a large pyre. He is remembered for his steadfast faith and courage in the face of death.

== Veneration ==
St. Ambrosio Kibuuka was beatified in 1920 by Pope Benedict XV and canonized in 1964 by Pope Paul VI. He is the patron saint of societies and youth movements such as the Scouts, Guides, Young Christian Workers, and Xaverians. His feast day is celebrated annually on June 3 at the Basilica Church of the Uganda Martyrs in Namugongo, Uganda.

== See also ==
- Andrew Kaggwa
- Charles Lwanga
- Uganda Martyrs
