= Busega Martyrs Memorial =

Memorial in Uganda

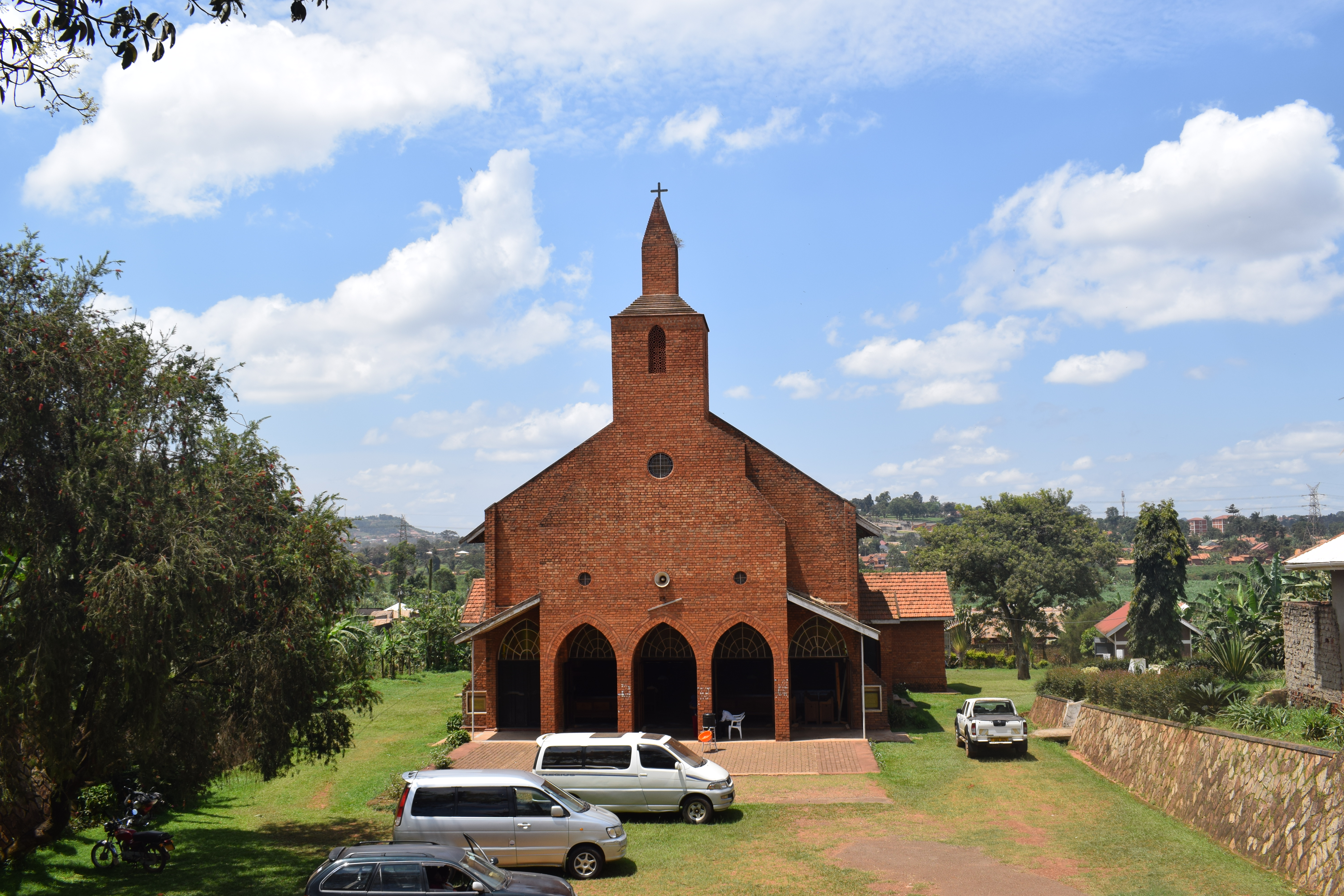
Busega Martyrs Memorial Church

The Busega Martyrs Memorial also known as Busega Martyrs Memorial Church is the site where the first three Ugandan Martyrs were killed in 1885.

The Uganda Martyrs were new Christian converts in Buganda kingdom who defied their new king Kabaka Mwanga and refused to denounce their newfound religion. As a result, the King ordered their killing and most of them were killed on another Martyrs' site called Namugongo.

Busega Martyrs memorial site is also known as Busega Mpimaerebera, Mpiima is a Luganda word for a cane made from hippopotamus skin.

The first Uganda Martyrs killed at this site were, Mark Kakumba who was aged 16, Noah Serwanga aged 19 and Yusuf Rugarama aged 12.

== History ==
The killing of the first Martyrs came about as a result of Alexander Murdoch Mackay's missionary activities which were detested by Kabaka Mwanga. On 25 January 1885, Mackay set out to go to Sukuma. Prime Minister Mukasa offered gifts of food for the journey. Mackay declined the king's offer of an escort, whom the king intended to act as spies. Instead he was guided by some boys who were then to return. The king decreed that anyone escorting the missionaries needed his permission. They were intercepted by the king's soldiers led by Kapalaga Mujaasi and accused of treason and later executed at Busega where the memorial stands today.

Years later, Bishop Wilkinson of Northern and central Europe heard the story of these Uganda Martyrs and was touched thus sending a memorial cross to be erected at the location where the first 3 Uganda Martyrs were killed. On 14 July 1910, a commemoration service led by Rev. Alfred Tucker, Bishop of Uganda at the time was held to unveil the martyrs memorial cross.

A church was later built at the site by Canon James Lutaaya Ddungu and on 28th/1/1984, the Archbishop of Canterbury, the most Rev. Robert Runcie laid the foundation stone and officially opened the church at the Martyrs church.

== Location ==
The site is located in Natetete Archdeaconry Namirebe Diocese at Busega town in Kampala Uganda.
