= Antanansio Bazzekuketta =

Saint Antanansio Bazzekuketta
- Born: c. 1866; Kingdom of Buganda, Uganda
- Died: May 27, 1886; Nakivubo, Uganda
- Cause of death: Executed by spearing

Antanansio Bazzekuketta (c. 1860 – May 27, 1886) was a Ugandan Catholic martyr, recognized as one of the Uganda Martyrs. He was a lay catechist who was executed for his unwavering commitment to Christianity during the reign of King Mwanga II of the Buganda Kingdom. Bazzekuketta was canonized by Pope Paul VI in 1964.

== Early life ==
Antanansio Bazzekuketta was born in the Buganda Kingdom, part of what is now Uganda, in the mid-19th century. His family was part of a larger Christian conversion movement within the kingdom, which was influenced by missionary activities brought by both Catholic and Anglican missionaries in the 19th century. It is during this time that Bazzekuketta was introduced to Christianity and decided to join the Catholic faith, eventually becoming a catechist. His baptism and later confirmation marked a deep commitment to Christianity.

== Veneration ==
Bazzekuketta was both beatified and canonized on October 18, 1964, by Pope Paul VI.
