= Uganda Martyrs Museum =

Museum in Kampala, Uganda

Coordinates: 0°23′44.64″N 32°39′59.3″E

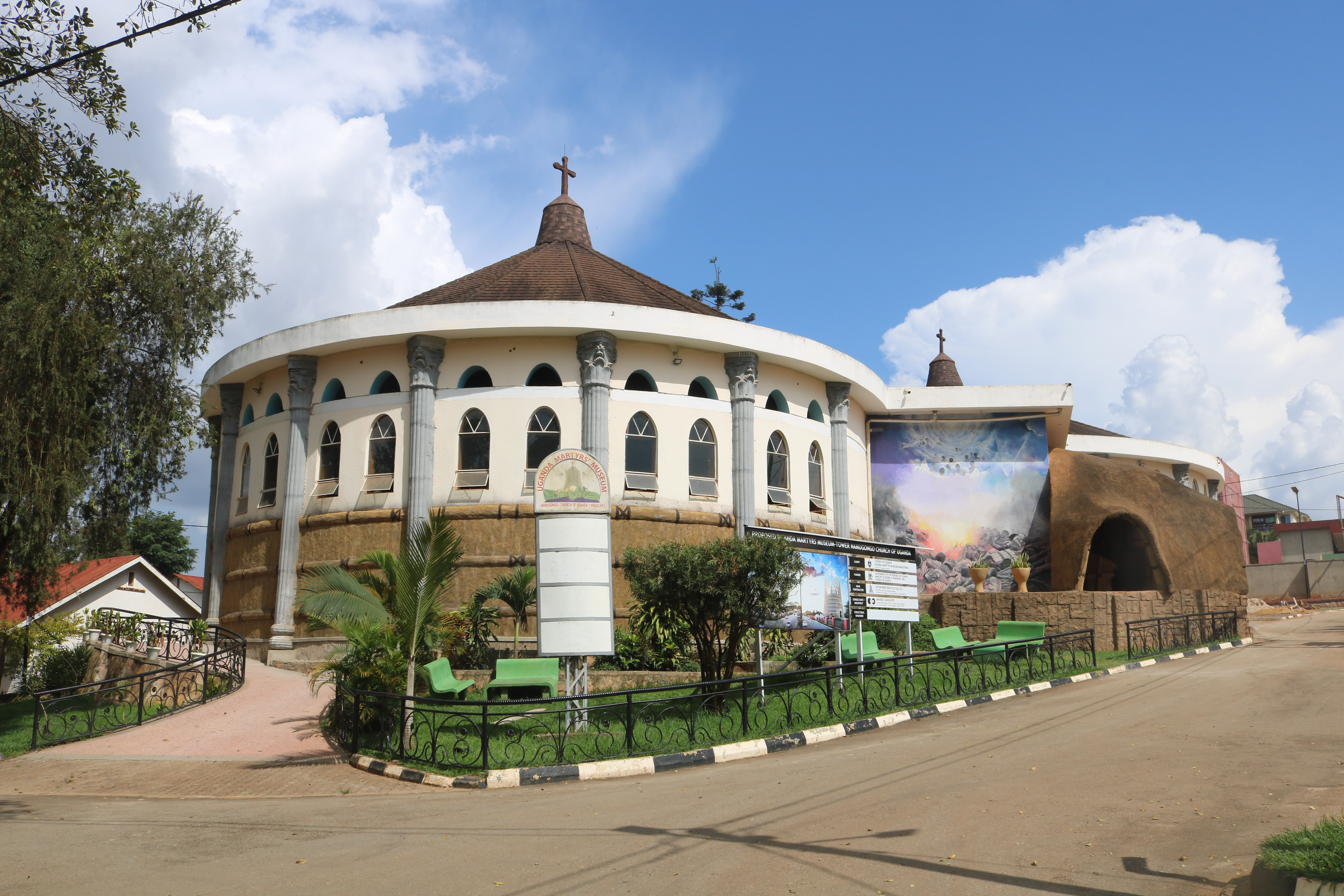

- Map of Kampala showing the location of Uganda Martyrs Museum
- Established: 2015
- Type: Historical

Uganda Martyrs Museum is a Ugandan museum located in Namugongo Kyaliwajjala Ward, in Kira Municipality, Wakiso District.

== History ==
The Uganda Martyrs Museum was established at the Church of Uganda grounds in Namugongo, conceived by Archbishop Livingstone Mpalanyi Nkoyoyo. It was opened by Pope Francis in November 2015. The museum was constructed under the guidance of the Catholic church and the Church of Uganda, in remembrance of the Uganda Martyr's, a group of 22 Catholic and 23 Anglican converts to Christianity who were executed between 1885 and 1887 on the orders of kabaka Mwanga II the king of Buganda. The museum is an important pilgrimage site and serves as center for documenting and preserving the history of christianity in Uganda.

== Galleries ==
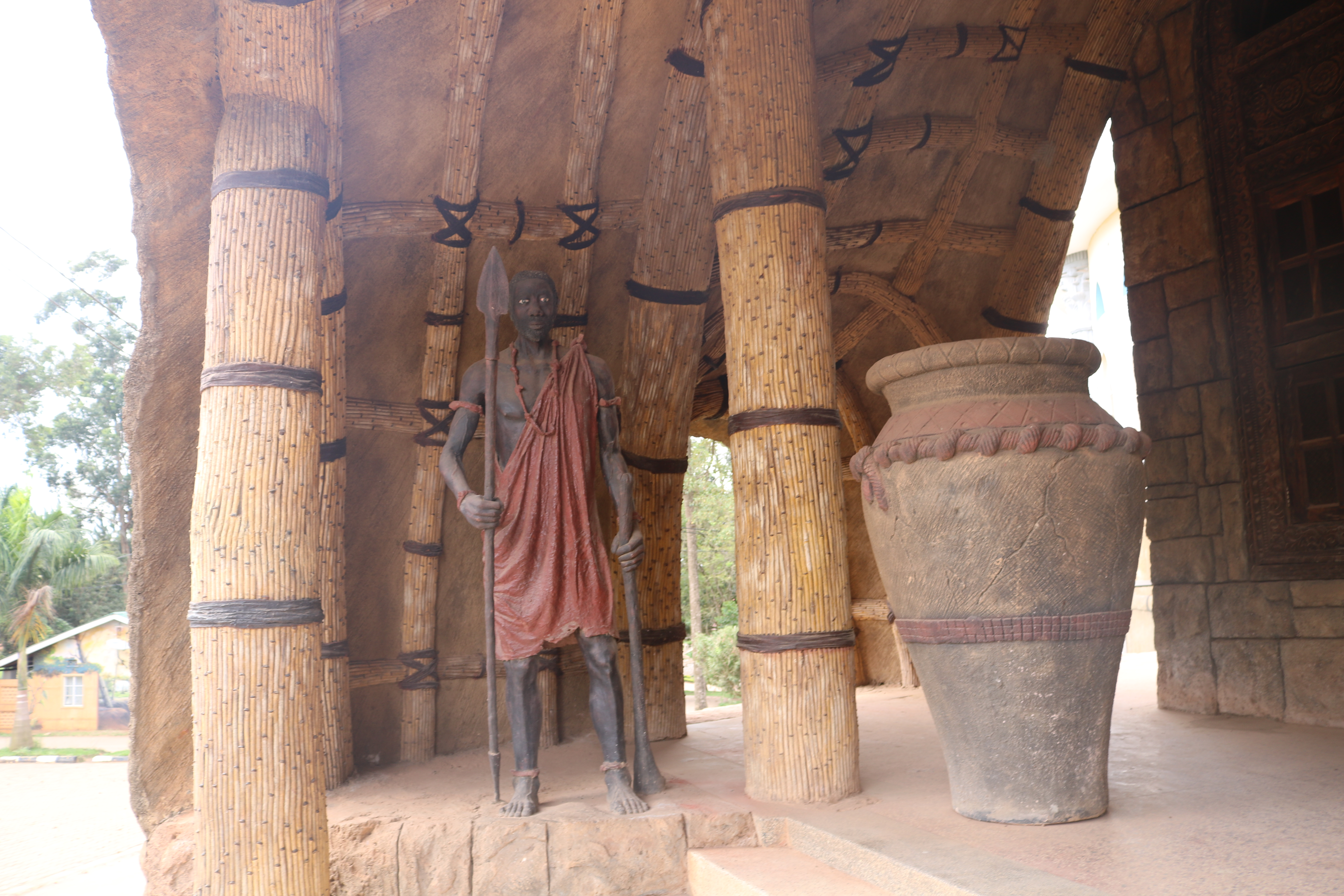

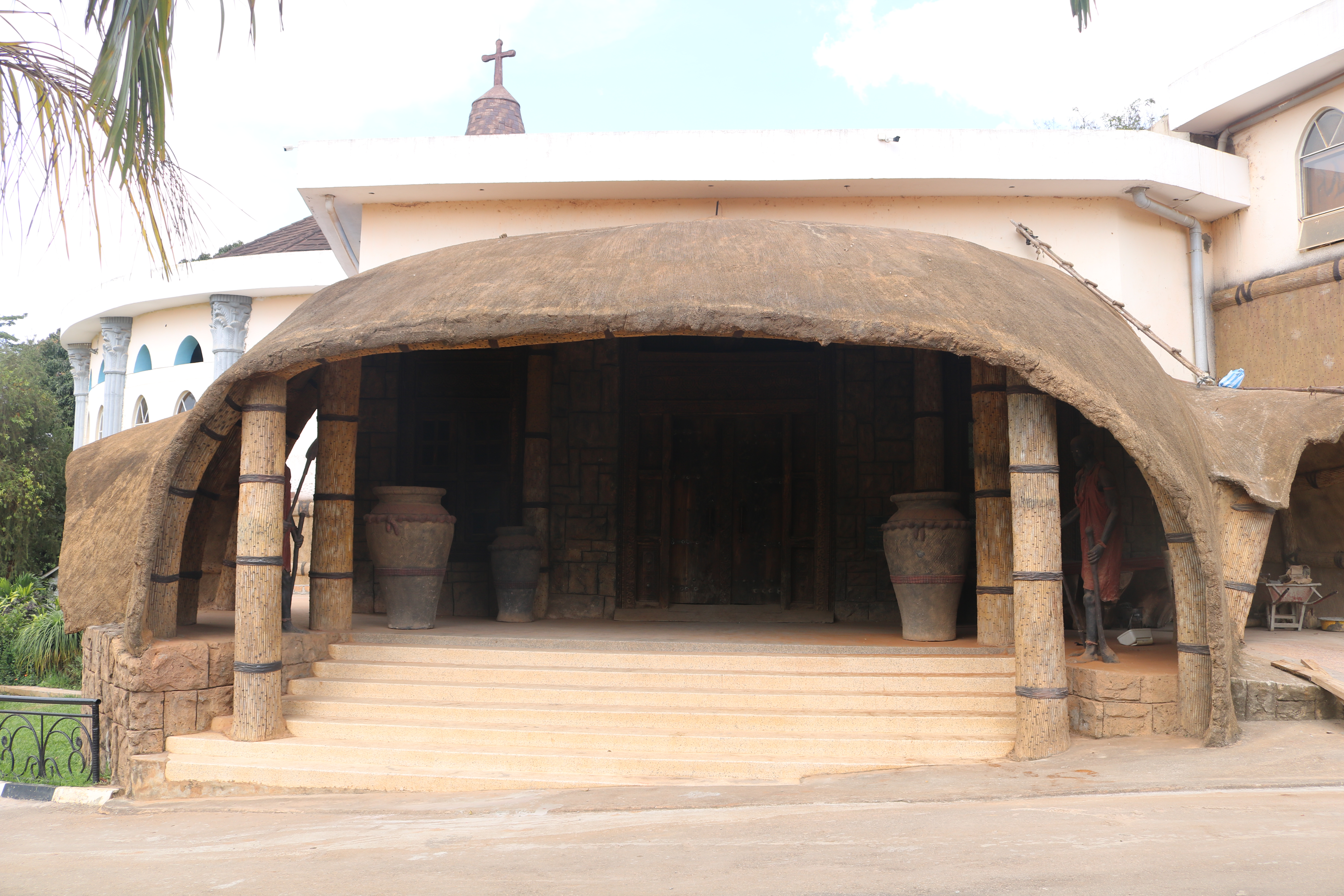

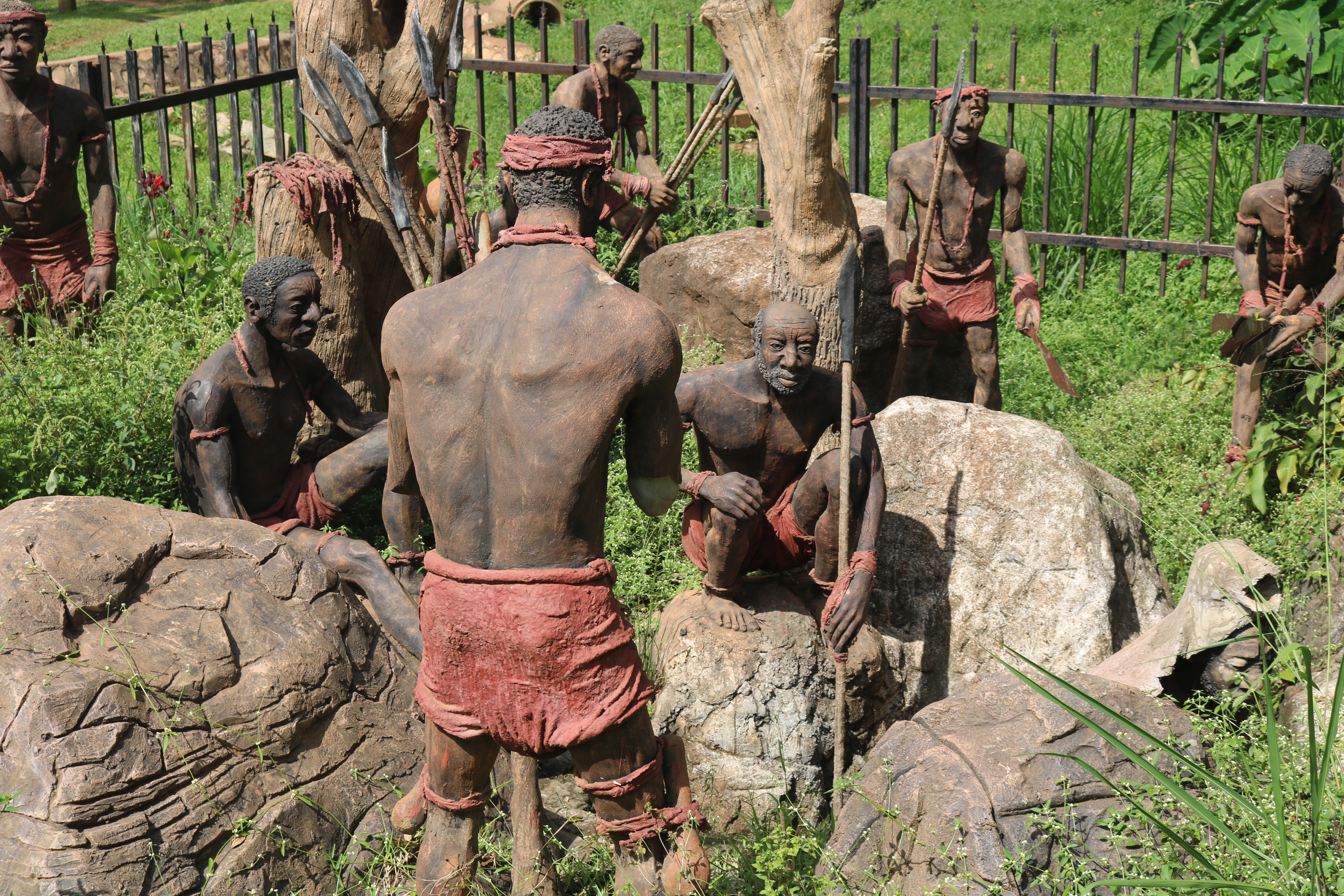

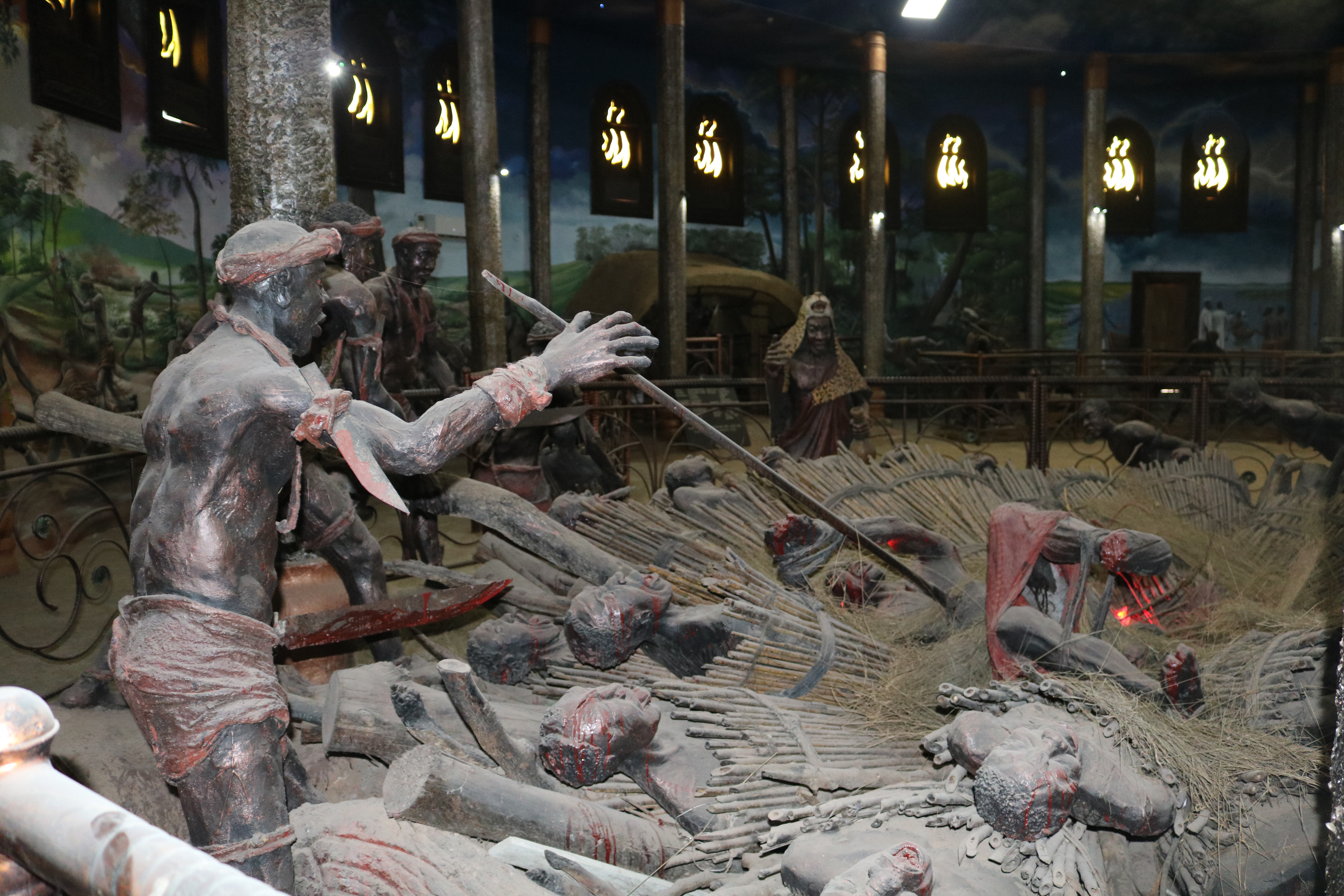

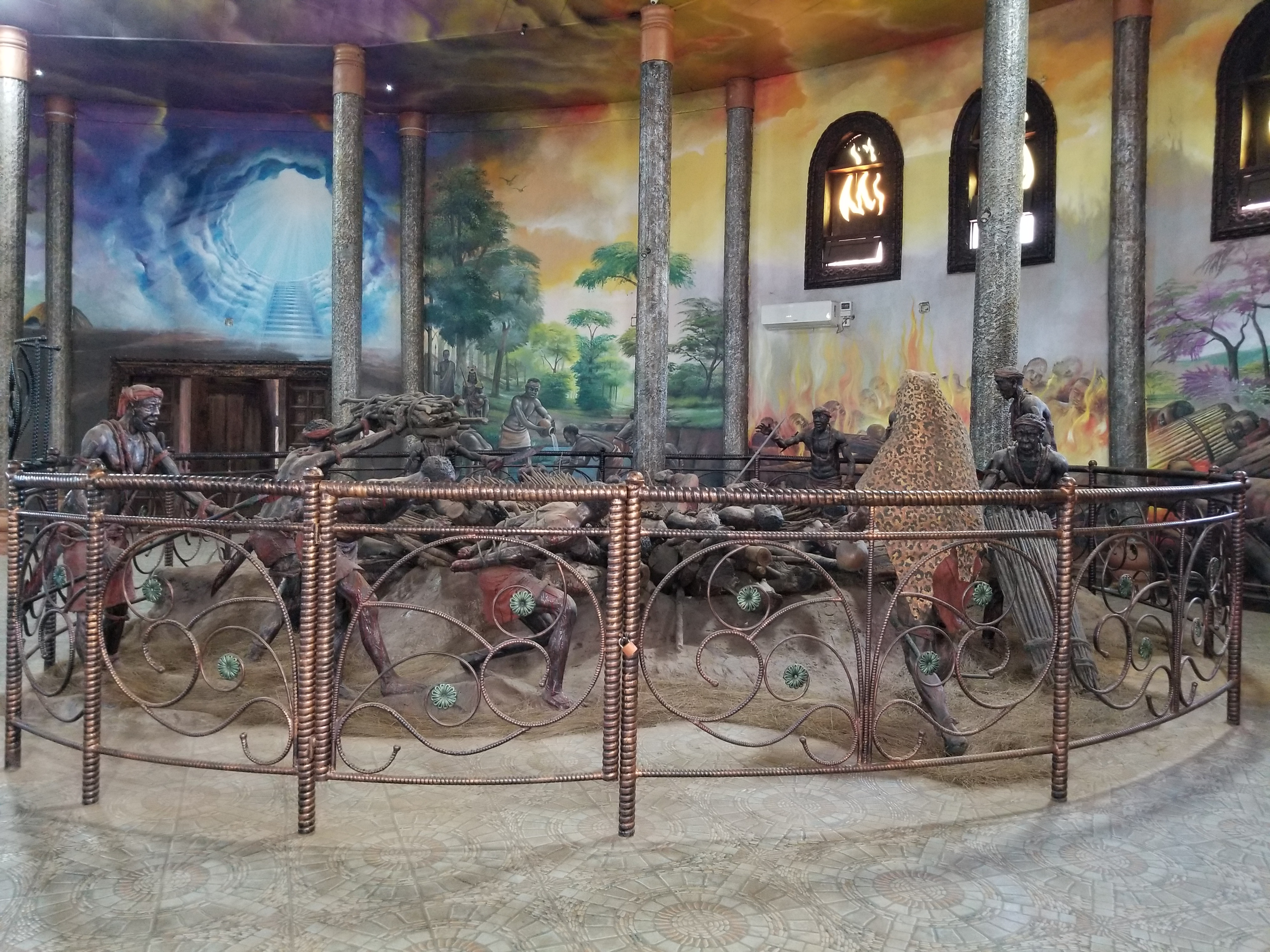

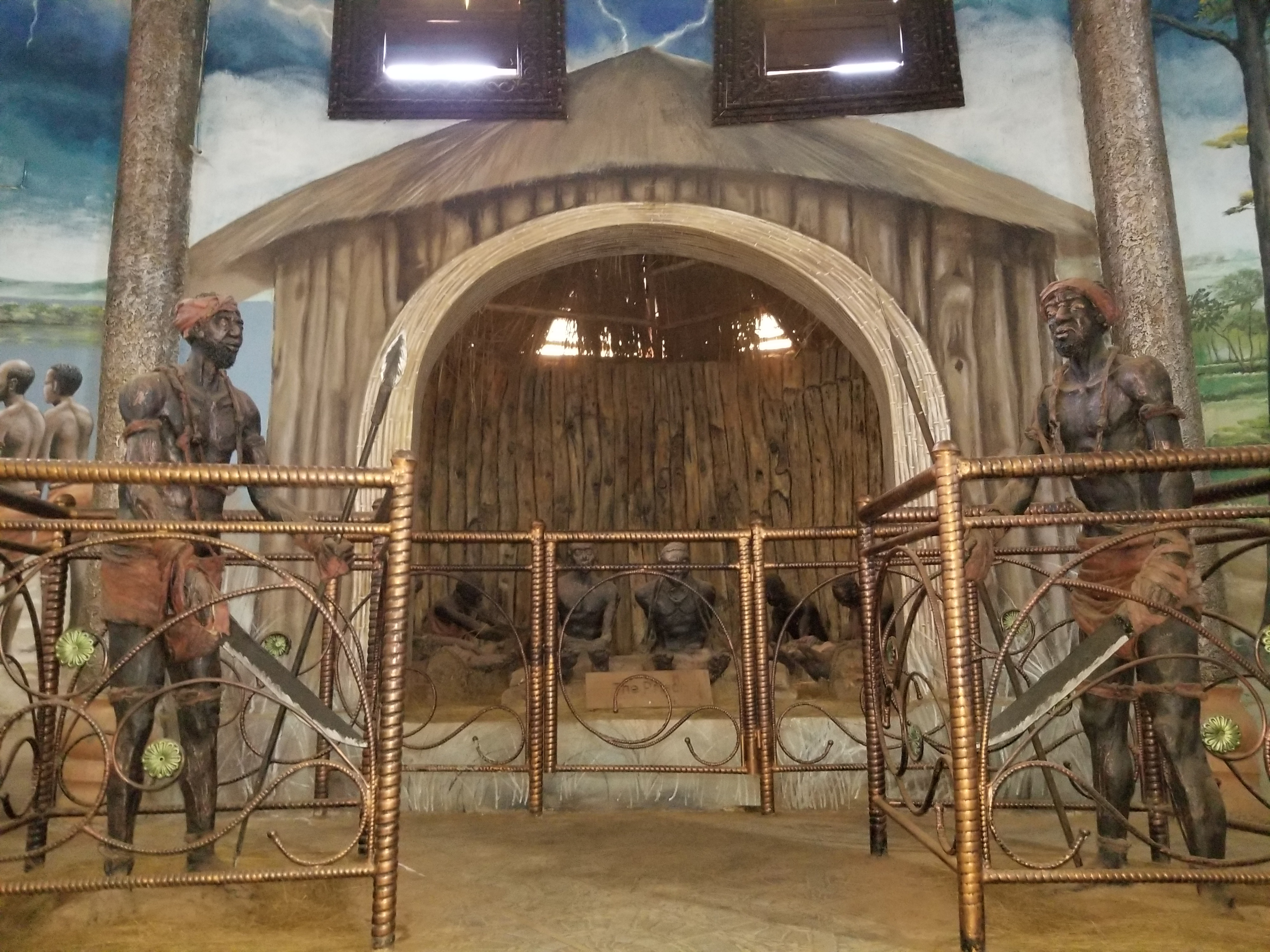

== Collection ==
The museum has artifacts, manuscripts, and religious relics related to the history of the martyrs and the introduction of christianity in Uganda. Exhibits include :

- Personal items of the martyrs
- traditional intrustments
- historical documents
- Artistic depictions of the martyrs` lives and sacrifice

== Architecture ==
The Uganda Martyrs Museum's architecture has both modern and traditional styles. It was built to honor the 45 Christian martyrs executed between 1885-1887, with its design reflecting the historical and spiritual significance of the site.

== See also ==
- Uganda Museum
- Ateker Cultural Centre
- St. Luke Community Museum
