= Aloysius Ngobya =

Ugandan Catholic archbishop (1953–2021)

- Monsignor (Deceased)
- Church: Catholic Church
- Archdiocese: Kampala

Orders
- Ordination: 1 June 1925

Personal details
- Born: 1896 Mulema Village, Kyannamukaaka Sub-county, Masaka District, Uganda
- Died: 9 January 1986 (aged 89–90) Rubaga Hospital, Uganda

Aloysius Ngobya (born 1896) was a Ugandan Catholic priest honored with a title of Monsignor.

== Background ==
Ngobya was born in 1896 in Mulema Village, Kyannamukaaka Sub-county, Masaka District, Uganda.

== Priesthood ==
Ngobya was ordained as a Catholic priest on 1 June 1925. He served as the parish priest of Bukulula and Kitovu Parish in the Masaka Diocese and after a long and dedicated service, he was granted the title Monsignor. He also authored four books: Olitutumuka, Nyoko Wuuno, Wewonye Puligatoli, and Nkuluze in addition to his pastoral work.

== Death ==
Ngobya died on 9 January 1986, at Rubaga Hospital in Kampala during Uganda’s internal conflict, rebel blockades prevented immediate burial. Cardinal Emmanuel Nsubuga ordered for preservation of his body however the attempts were unsuccessful. His body was transported for burial to Kitovu Cathedral in Masaka on 20 February, 1986, fulfilling his request to be buried beside the Blessed Virgin Mary’s Chapel.

== Sainthood ==
Following his death in 1986, Ngobya was declared as a Servant of God by Vatican 18 February 2013, under Pope Benedict XVI.

== Pilgrimages and devotion ==
Monsignor Aloysius Ngobya is honored at Kitovu Cathedral, where the Father Aloysius Ngobya Memorial attracts pilgrims seeking healing and inspiration. For example, Eddie Makumbi from Kyengera received a job interview after his prayers, attributing it to Ngobya’s help. John Lubira testified that his business improved significantly, while Gertrude Namwanje credited her exam success to prayers offered at the site.

Between 1944 and 1949, His spiritual authority is seen when he cursed a mango tree at Bukulula Parish, making its fruit bitter to stop children from playing and missing Sunday services.

== See also ==
- Joseph Kiwanuka
- Uganda Martyrs
- Roman Catholicism in Uganda
- Cyprian Kizito Lwanga
- James Kabuye
