= Cassien de Nantes =

Capuchin priest, missionary and martyr

Blessed Cassien of Nantes OFM Cap.
- Born: 14 January 1607; Nantes
- Died: August 7, 1638 (aged 31); Ethiopia
- Venerated in: Roman Catholicism
- Beatified: 1 January 1905 by Pope Pius X

Cassien of Nantes, OFM Cap. (born Gonzalve Vaz Lopez-Netto; 1607 – 1638) was a French Capuchin missionary priest in Africa during the 17th century. Born on 14 January 1607 in Nantes to parents of Portuguese ancestry, he traveled with fellow Capuchin Agathange of Vendome through Syria, Egypt and Ethiopia. Accused of preaching to the Copts, they were ordered by the King of Gondar to be killed with a blow to the head. They were martyred on 7 August 1638.
