= Sisters of the Poor, Palazzolo Institute =

Religious institution

The Sisters of the Poor, Palazzolo Institute (Italian: Suore delle Poverelle dell'Istituto Palazzolo; Latin: Institutum Sororum Paupercularum; abbreviation: S.d.P.I.P.) is a religious institute of pontifical right whose members profess public vows of chastity, poverty, and obedience and follow the evangelical way of life in common.

Their mission includes service to the poor, care of orphans and nursing.

This religious institute was founded in Bergamo, Italy, in 1869, by St. Luigi Maria Palazzolo, with the help of Maria Teresa Gabrieli. The institute received pontifical status in 1912.

In 1995, several sisters died from Ebola while serving as missionaries in Kitwit, DRC; in 2021 Pope Francis recognized three of them as 'Venerable'.

== 21st century ==
In 2021, there were almost 100 sisters in 103 communities. The sisters have houses in Brazil, Burkina Faso, Congo, Italy, Ivory Coast, Kenya, Malawi and Peru. The Generalate of the Congregation can be found in Bergamo, Italy.

In 2023, the head of the institute is Sister Clara Fiori.
