= Achilleus Kewanuka =

Ugandan Roman Catholic saint

Saint Achilleus Kiwanuka
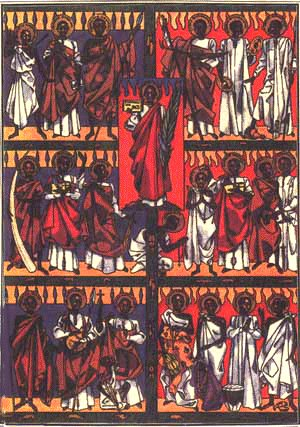
- Achilleus Kiwanuka and his companions

Martyr
- Born: 1869; Buganda, Uganda
- Died: June 3, 1886 (aged 16–17); Namugongo, Uganda
- Venerated in: Catholic Church
- Beatified: 1920 by Pope Benedict XV
- Canonized: October 18, 1964 by Pope Paul VI
- Major shrine: Basilica Church of the Uganda Martyrs, Namugongo
- Feast: June 3
- Patronage: Clerks, the press, journalists and writers

Achilleus Kiwanuka, also known as Achileo Kiwanuka or Achilles Kiwanuka or Achiles Kiwanuka (1869 – June 3, 1886), was a Ugandan Catholic martyr revered as a saint in the Catholic Church.

== Life ==
Kiwanuka was born at Lulagala in Ssingo County and was a member of the Lugave clan of the Baganda tribe. His father was an efficient deputy County Chief for a long time.

At the age of fifteen Kiwanuka was chosen to serve as a page and messenger at audience hall in the court of King Mwanga II of Buganda, and converted to the Christian faith under the missionary group known as the Missionaries of Africa. He was baptized by Pere Simeon Lourdel on the night of 16 November 1885, receiving the name Achilles.

King Muteesa I had welcomed the missionaries and had played off the Catholics, Anglicans, and the Moslem traders, seeming to favor first one, then another, for political gain. His son, Mwanga II succeeded his father in 1884 at the age of sixteen and came to view the Christians as a threat, as it was under their influence the royal pages resisted his advances. Recent German incursions on the coast also made him suspicious of outsiders. Furious that anyone would dare to oppose him, he expelled missionaries and ordered the death of Anglican bishop James Hannington.

Joseph Mukasa Balikuddembe was a court official and leader among the Christians, who spoke out against the killing of Hannington. The king saw this as insubordinate and ordered Balikuddembe killed. King Mwanga insisted that Christian converts abandon their new faith and executed many Anglicans and Catholics who did not.

Kiwanuka was seventeen years old when he was burned alive for his faith at Namugongo on June 3, 1886; he and his companions became known as the Martyrs of Uganda. They were canonized as saints in 1964 by Pope Paul VI. Kiwanuka's feast day is celebrated on June 3.
