= Bruno Sserunkuuma =

Ugandan Catholic martyr and saint (died 1885)

Saint Bruno Sserunkuuma
- Died: 1885
- Honored in: Catholic Church
- Feast: 3 June

Bruno Sserunkuuma was a Ugandan Catholic martyr and soldier who served under King Mwanga II of Buganda, and was burned alive for converting to Catholicism on 18 November 1885.

His feast day is 3 June, which is shared with a series of other Ugandan Catholics who were executed for their faith. The group was canonized on 8 October 1964 by Pope Paul VI.
