= Missionary religious institutes and societies =

Catholic associations for proselytism

A missionary order is a Catholic religious order devoted to active missionary work. No Catholic religious order was founded for that purpose, but all the mendicant orders have been active in this field and others too, in particular the Jesuits, whose members include outstanding missionaries such as Saint Francis Xavier and Matteo Ricci. Even monastic orders have engaged and still engage in missionary endeavours, as did, for instance, the Benedictines whom Pope Gregory the Great sent to evangelize the Angles.

A missionary congregation is a religious congregation devoted to active missionary work. Some, as that of the Marist Fathers, have that field of work as the purpose for which they were founded. It has also been suggested that all congregations, at their foundation, are missionary focussed. The largest Catholic missionary congregation is the Society of the Divine Word.

A Catholic missionary society is a society of apostolic life devoted to active missionary work. Orders and congregations are classes of religious institutes, but societies of apostolic life, while similar, are of distinct character in that their members do not take religious vows. Missionary societies include the Paris Foreign Missions Society, the Pontifical Institute for Foreign Missions, the Missionaries of the Precious Blood, the Missionary Society of St. Columban, and the Catholic Foreign Mission Society of America.

== See also ==
- Ad gentes
- Congregation for the Evangelization of Peoples
- Jesuit China missions
- Society for the Propagation of the Faith
