= Matiya Mulumba =

Ugandan martyr venerated by the Roman Catholic church

Saint Matiya Mulumba Sebastian
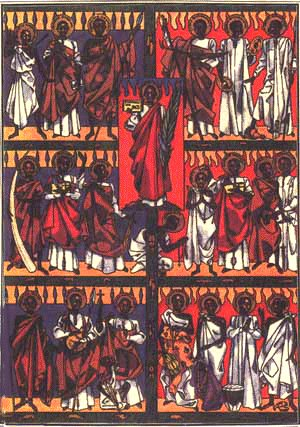
- Matiya Mulumba and his companions

Martyr
- Born: 1836; Busoga, Uganda
- Died: 30 May 1886; Old Kampala, Uganda
- Venerated in: Roman Catholic Church
- Beatified: 1920 by Pope Benedict XV
- Canonized: 18 October 1964 by Pope Paul VI
- Major shrine: Basilica Church of the Uganda Martyrs, Namugongo
- Feast: 30 May
- Patronage: of Uganda,Chiefs and families

Matiya Mulumba, also known as Matthias Murumba Kalemba (1836 – 30 May 1886), was a Ugandan Catholic and one of the Martyrs of Uganda. He was killed on or around 30 May 1886 in his 50s. He, among the other martyrs, underwent the most excruciating suffering, as he was skinned alive and left to die.

In 1920, Pope Benedict XV beatified Mulumba, and on 18 October 1964, he was canonized by Pope Paul VI.

== Early life and conversion to Catholicism ==
Matiya was born in Bunya county in Busoga. He was adopted by Fr. Magatto, and after Magatto's death, he stayed with Magatto's brother, Buzibwa. He first converted to Islam but later became a Catholic catechumen on the 31 May 1880. He was baptized by Pere Ludovic Girault at his home in Mityana.

While building Kabaka Mwanga's palace, which had been destroyed by fire on 22 February 1886, Mulumba, together with Charles Lwanga, Lukka Baanabakintu and Mukwenda, was arrested, imprisoned and condemned to death by Mukasa, the Prime Minister (Katikiro) of Buganda by then. Mulumba was taken to Old Kampala, where he was burnt alive. while Lwanga was taken to Namugongo.
