= Uganda Martyrs =

19th-century group of Christian martyrs

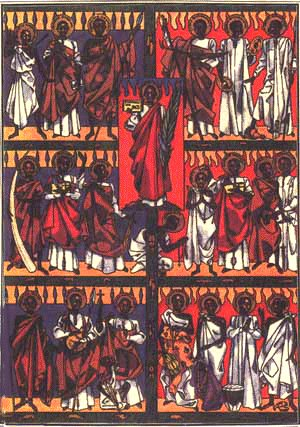
- 1962 illustration by Albert Wider.
- Died: 1885–87, Uganda
- Martyred by: Mwanga II
- Venerated in: Catholic Church; Anglican Communion; Lutheranism
- Feast: 3 June
- Notable martyrs: Charles Lwanga; Kizito; Andrew Kaggwa

The Uganda Martyrs (Luganda: Abajulizi ba Uganda) were a group of 22 Catholic and 23 Anglican converts to Christianity in the kingdom of Buganda, now part of Uganda, who were executed between 31 January 1885 and 27 January 1887.

They were killed on orders of Mwanga II, the Kabaka (King) of Buganda. The deaths took place at a time when there was a three-way religious struggle for political influence at the Buganda royal court. The episode also occurred against the backdrop of the Scramble for Africa – the invasion, occupation, division, colonization and annexation of African territory by European powers. A few years after, the English Church Missionary Society used the deaths to enlist wider public support for the British acquisition of Uganda for the Empire. The 22 Catholic martyrs were beatified by the Catholic Church in 1920 and canonized in 1964 by Pope Paul VI at St. Peter's Basilica in Rome. In 2024, the remains of two Catholic martyrs, Charles Lwanga and Mathias Mulumba, were returned to Uganda.

== Context ==
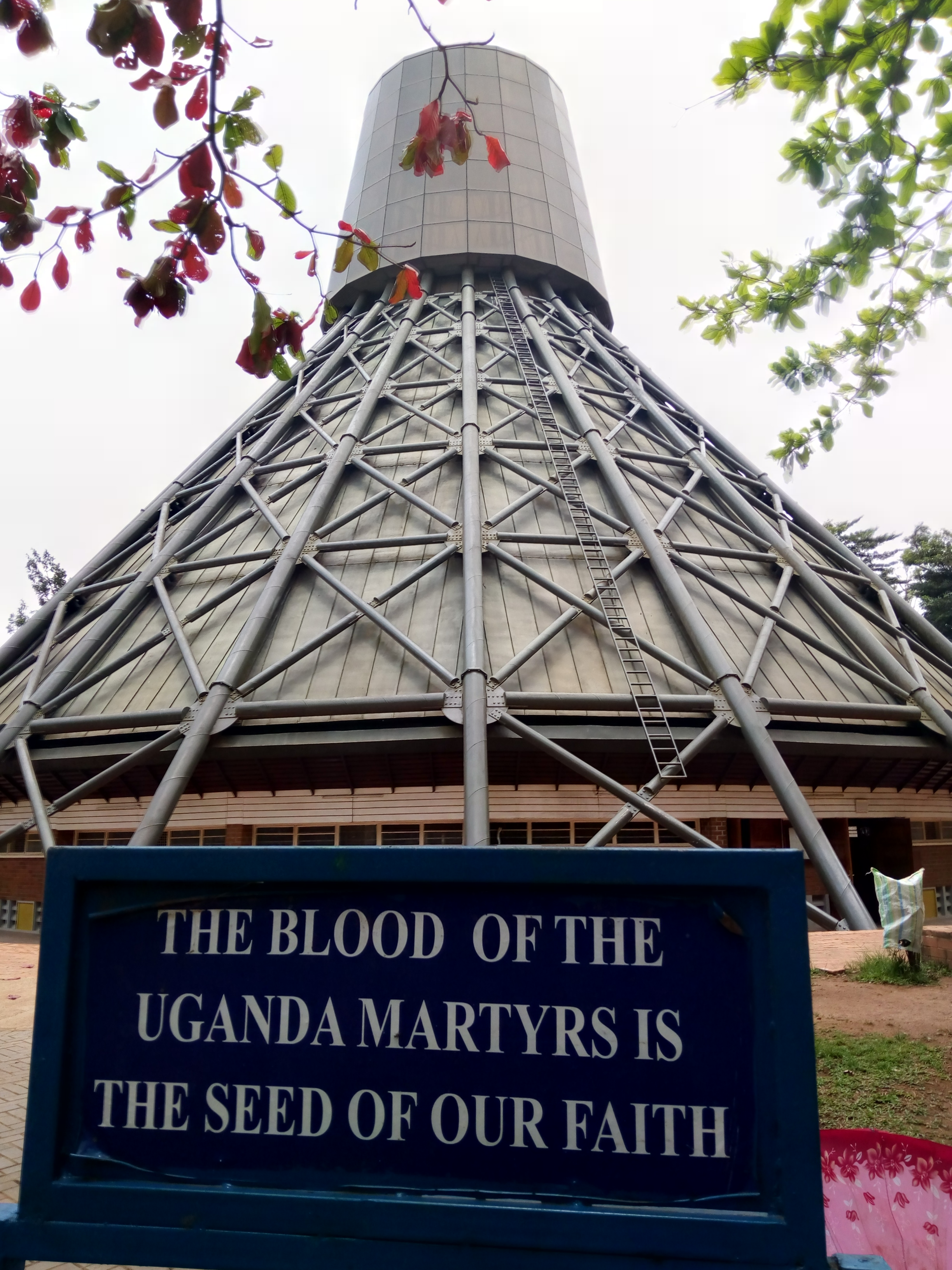
Basilica of the Uganda Martyrs, Namugongo

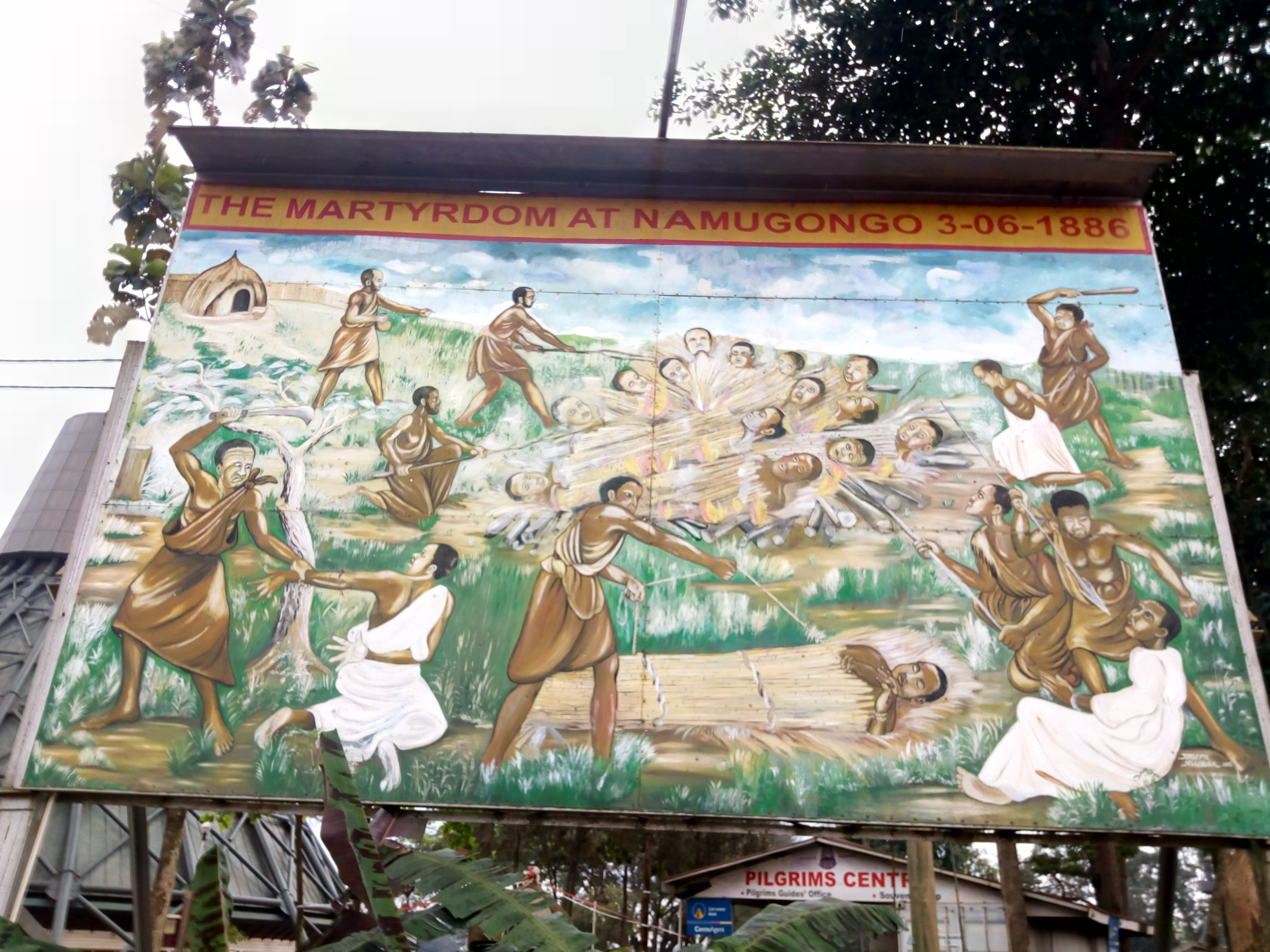
Depiction of how the Ugandan Martyrs were tortured

Publication in Britain of an 1875 letter purporting to be an invitation from Kabaka Muteesa I, to send missionaries, resulted in the arrival of Alexander Mackay of the Anglican Church Missionary Society to Buganda in 1877. A group of French Catholic White Fathers, led by Père Simon Lourdel (Fr. Mapera) appeared two years later. Arab traders from Zanzibar had introduced Islam into the kingdom. This effectively led to a three-way religious struggle for political influence at the Buganda royal court. By the mid-1880s, many had been converted by each of the three groups, and some of the converts held important posts at the king's court. Muteesa himself sympathized with Islam, but many prominent chiefs had become Christians.

Kabaka Mwanga II succeeded to the throne in 1884. He was concerned at the growing influence of Christianity and the rise of a new class of officials, distinct from the traditional territorial chiefs, who were educated, had a religious orientation, and wished to reform the Ganda society. The German annexation of what is now Tanzania sparked further alarm. A year after becoming king, he ordered the execution of Yusufu Rugarama, Makko Kakumba, and Nuwa/Noah Serwanga, who had converted to Christianity. Encouraged by his prime minister, on 29 October 1885, he had the incoming Anglican bishop James Hannington assassinated on the eastern border of his kingdom. This may have been deliberately intended to send a message to the British that he did not wish for them to make inroads in Uganda. It is also alleged that the murder of Bishop James Hannington was due to a myth at the time that enemies that would destroy the Kingdom would come from the East, the direction which the Bishop was coming from. Thus the Kabaka had chief Luba of Busoga Chiefdom in the East execute the Bishop. Mwanga did, however, subsequently appoint several Christians to important military positions.

== Executions in 1885–86 ==
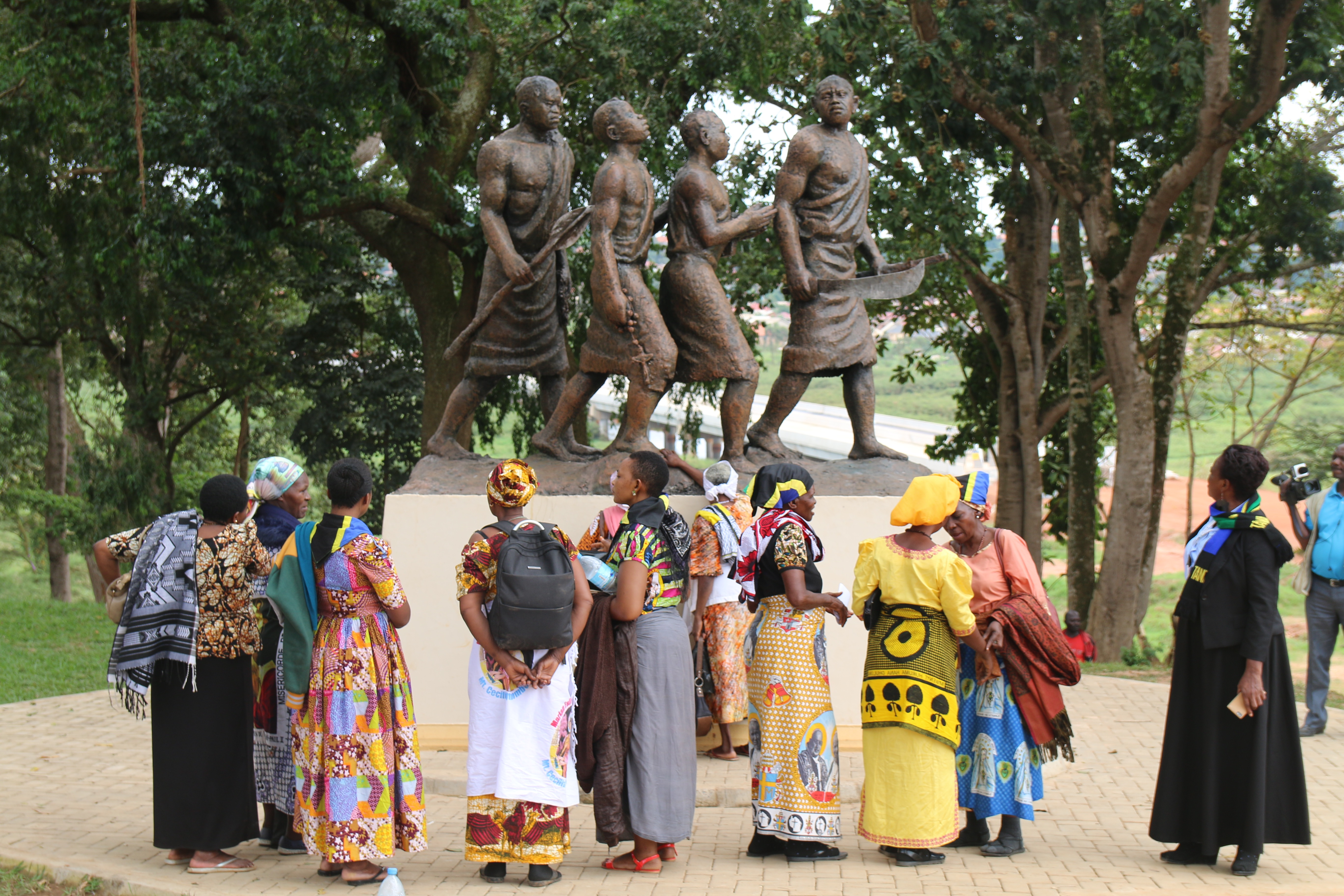
A monument at the Munyonyo Martyrs Shrine marking the spot from where future martyrs walked to their deaths

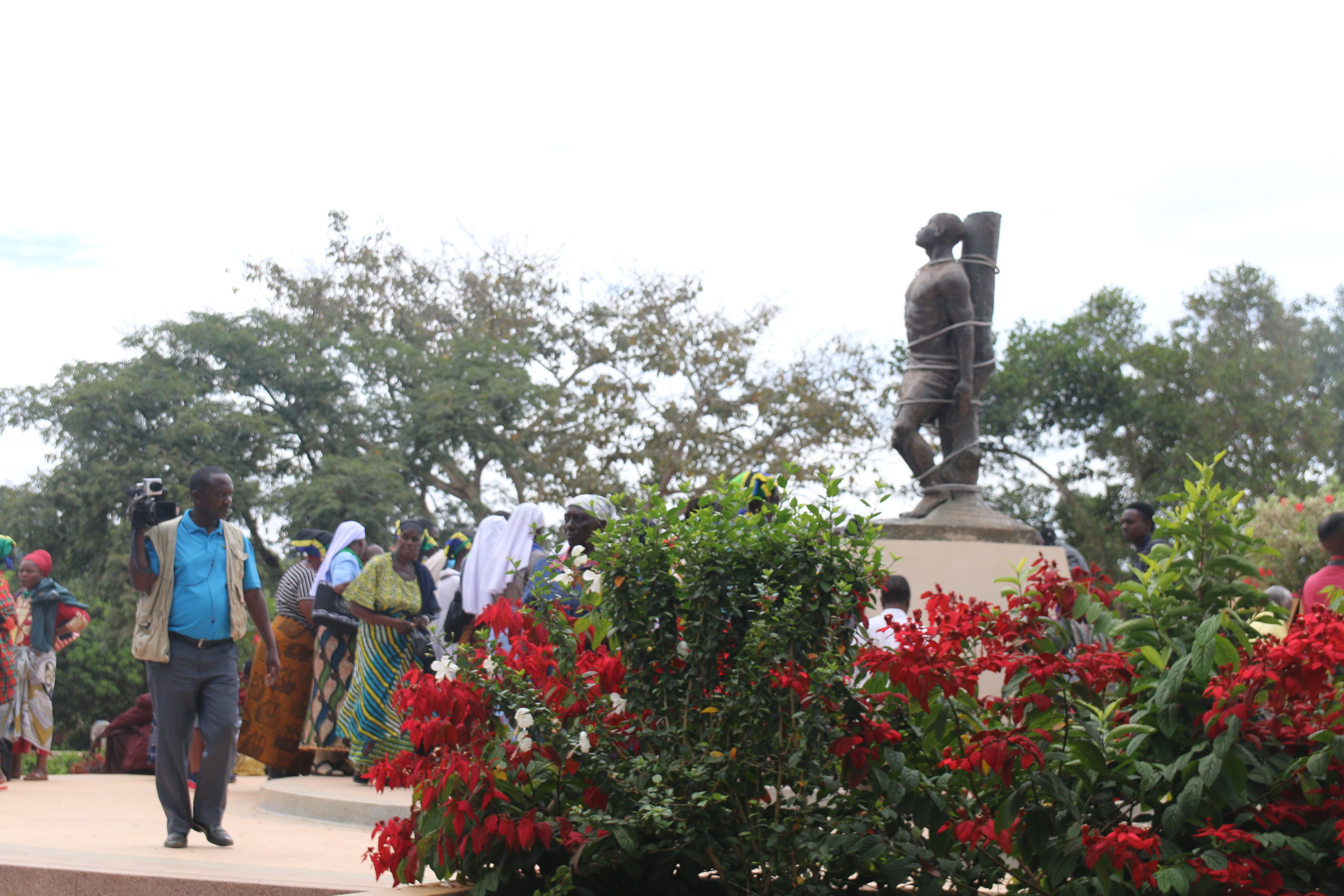
Martyrdom of Andrew Kaggwa

In 1886, Mwanga ordered the executions of many members of the royal court for refusing to yield to his religious demands, which he saw as insubordination. Heike Behrend says they were both Christian and Muslim converts; other sources speak only of Anglican and Catholic victims, and mention the killing of Muslims as having occurred ten years earlier at the hands of Mwanga's father Muteesa. Joseph Mukasa, a convert to Christianity who had deplored the assassination of Hannington, and had tried to protect the court pages, was the first to be executed on 15 November 1885: this was at the instigation of the Katikkiro (prime minister) Mukasa, whose successor Joseph Mukasa was tipped to become king. Then, between 25 May and 3 June 1886, a wider series of executions were carried out. Mwanga instructed the killing of all the young men who disobeyed him – partly to satisfy the demands of the older chiefs. Twenty-two of the men, who had converted to Catholicism, were burned alive at Namugongo in 1886.

"The reasons behind the persecution are still heavily debated", Behrend states. Political factors certainly also played a part. Those killed included minor chiefs, some of whom, such as Joseph Mukasa, were "the victims of particular grudges by their seniors ... jealous that these up and coming young men would soon be ousting them from power". Ward has argued that the motivation was the perception that "these Christians were rebels against the Kabaka, unwitting tools of foreign imperialism".

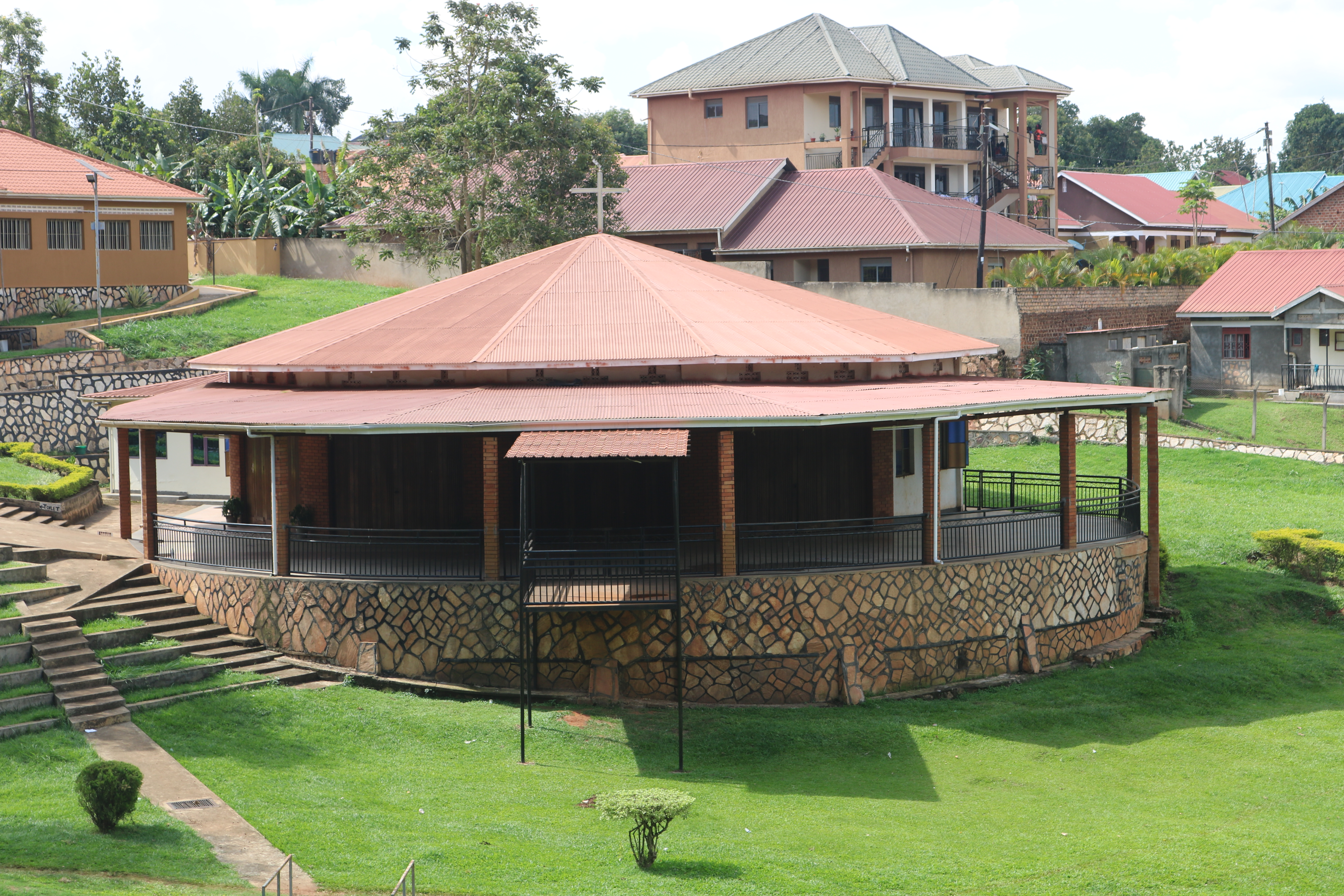
Uganda Martyrs Church Namugongo in Uganda

A witness to the event, the French missionary priest Lourdel, considered that the principal cause was Mwanga's feeling of being despised by the literate Christians who claimed a superior knowledge of religion. Lourdel gave as a secondary cause of Mwanga's action the refusal of the pages to meet the traditional royal demands of sexual submission. The king, who by tradition had the power of life and death over his subjects, was angered by this refusal to obey his wishes to have sex with him.

Marie de Kiewet-Hemphill concludes that the immediate pretext, if not the whole cause, was therefore the refusal of the pages to offer themselves to Mwanga Roland Oliver rejects resentment against Christianity as a sufficient reason, since it does not explain why Mwanga took action against these young men and not against prominent chiefs and women among the converts. Sylvia Antonia Nannyonga-Tamusuza draws attention to the same point. J. P. Thoonen in his book on the question agrees with Kiewet-Hemphill's analysis, while recognising the existence of other political factors. Particularly as some of those that renounced their faith were spared death."

In the week leading to the executions, the Christian Matthias Gayinga rejected the sexual demands of Mwanga's close friend, the Muslim Lutaya, to whom the king had sent him for that purpose. For this he was severely punished, though not killed. His stance was described as a "splendid refusal" by the English missionary A. P. Ashe, who later said it set the spark for later events. His action was followed by the refusal of another convert, Anatole Kirrigwajjo, to accept nomination to a high post "which he could only exercise at the peril of his soul".

While many of the Christian pages often arranged to be missing when Mwanga demanded them, or refused his sexual solicitation outright, one page Muwafi did comply. Mwanga is said to have caught another page teaching Christianity to Muwafi. Mwanga saw this as an attempt "to rob him of his favourite and so far always compliant toy, by teaching him the religion which made them prefer death to submission". Mwanga summoned the pages and asked those who prayed to stand to one side. These, most of whom were between 15 and 30 years old, were then taken on a long journey to execution by being burnt alive. By displaying the courage their Christianity demanded, they weakened the resistance of traditional Ugandan culture, which emphasized the ideals of heroism, to the new religion.

== Political aftermath ==
The converts, at least the Catholics, had been taught they risked martyrdom. The secular press of the time described them as martyrs. The same description appeared also, of course, in religious publications, both Protestant, such as the journal of the missionary Mackay published in the Intellegencer of 1886, and Catholic, such as the accounts of the missionaries Lourdel, Denoit, and Delmas published in Enquête relative au martyre des chrétiens: Ste Marie de Rubaga, Buganda 1888 and Les Missions Catholiques 18 (1886).

News of Mwanga's actions provoked contradictory reactions in Britain. Some saw it as a sign of the futility of missionary efforts in Buganda, others as a call to renewed efforts. The Times of 30 October 1886, quoting the dictum, "the blood of martyrs is the seed of the Church", stated: "On the success of the Uganda experiment, with its alternation of favourable and adverse circumstances, depends the happiness of the interior of the vast continent for generations." This sentiment developed into a campaign for British intervention in the region.

In September 1888, Mwanga planned to get rid of remaining Christian and Muslim leaders by leaving them to starve on an island in crocodile-infested Lake Victoria. Word of his plan leaked out and a rebellion by Christians and Muslims together brought Mwanga's brother Kiweewa to the throne. In October 1888, the Muslims seized power, expelled the Christian leaders and, when Kiweewa refused to be circumcised, deposed and killed him, replacing him with another brother, Kalema. In December 1888, Mwanga won support from Christians and in April 1889 advanced against the Buganda capital. He was defeated, but the Christian forces, led by the Protestant chief Apollo Kaggwa, retook the capital, enabling Mwanga to enter it triumphantly on 11 October 1889. The Muslims took refuge in the neighbouring kingdom of Bunyoro, which helped them to return victoriously in November 1889, but they suffered a decisive defeat in February 1890 and withdrew again to Bunyoro.

In 1888, British authorities authorized the Imperial British East Africa Company (IBEAC) to administer the East African territory assigned to Britain in its 1886 treaty with Germany. In November 1889, Mwanga asked the company's agent Frederick Jackson for help. Jackson hesitated to accept the request, because he had been given orders not to enter Buganda. Carl Peters, an agent of the corresponding German company, learning of Mwanga's appeal, decided to respond to it. He arrived at Mengo, Mwanga's new capital, a fortnight after the February 1890 defeat of the Muslims. Since these still presented a threat, Mwanga accepted his offer of a treaty. Jackson then arrived and offered a treaty, which Mwanga rejected, since even the English missionaries considered its terms too onerous.

The agreement that Peters made with Mwanga was nullified by the Heligoland–Zanzibar Treaty between Britain and Germany, which extended inland the line of division between their areas of influence in East Africa, leaving Buganda in the British sphere and moving the centre of interest from the coast to the hinterland. The IBEAC sent Frederick Lugard, its military administrator, to Mengo, where in December 1890 he got Mwanga to accept for a period of two years an agreement with the company. This agreement was advantageous for Mwanga when the Muslims in Bunyoro made another attempt to recover power. Friction between the Catholic and the Protestant parties led to fighting in January 1892 in Mengo. Lugard supported the Protestants against the stronger Catholic side in the fighting, forcing Mwanga and the Catholics to flee. Lugard managed to persuade Mwanga to return from German territory, where he had taken refuge, to Mengo on 30 March 1892 and to make a new treaty. This treaty assigned separate areas to Protestants (the largest area), Catholics, and (only a small area) Muslims; Mwanga himself nominally became a Protestant.

With the aid of the Church Missionary Society, which used the deaths of their martyrs to win broad public support in Britain for acquiring Uganda, Lugard then successfully dissuaded Prime Minister William Ewart Gladstone and his cabinet from abandoning Uganda. The powers of the IBEAC were transferred to the British Crown on 1 April 1893 and on 27 August 1894 Mwanga accepted Buganda being made a British protectorate. However, on 6 July 1897 he declared war on Britain. Defeated on 20 July in Buddu (in today's Masaka District), an area assigned to Catholics in the 1892 treaty, he again fled to German East Africa. He was declared deposed on 9 August. After a failed attempt to recover his kingdom, he was exiled in 1899 to the Seychelles, where he was received into the Anglican Church. He died in 1903, aged 35.

== Catholic Church veneration ==
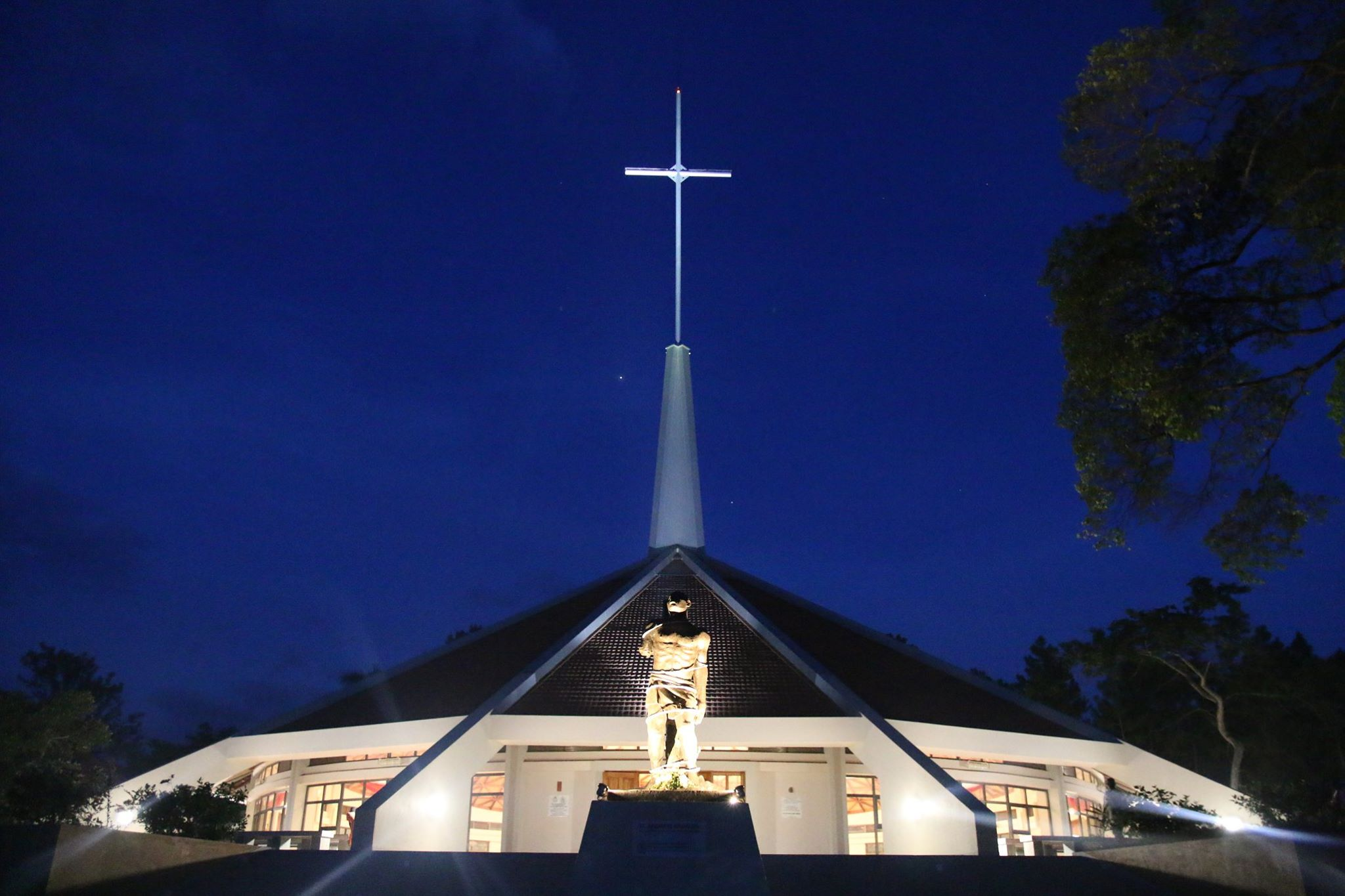
Shrine in Munyonyo constructed as thanksgiving for the canonization of Uganda Martyrs

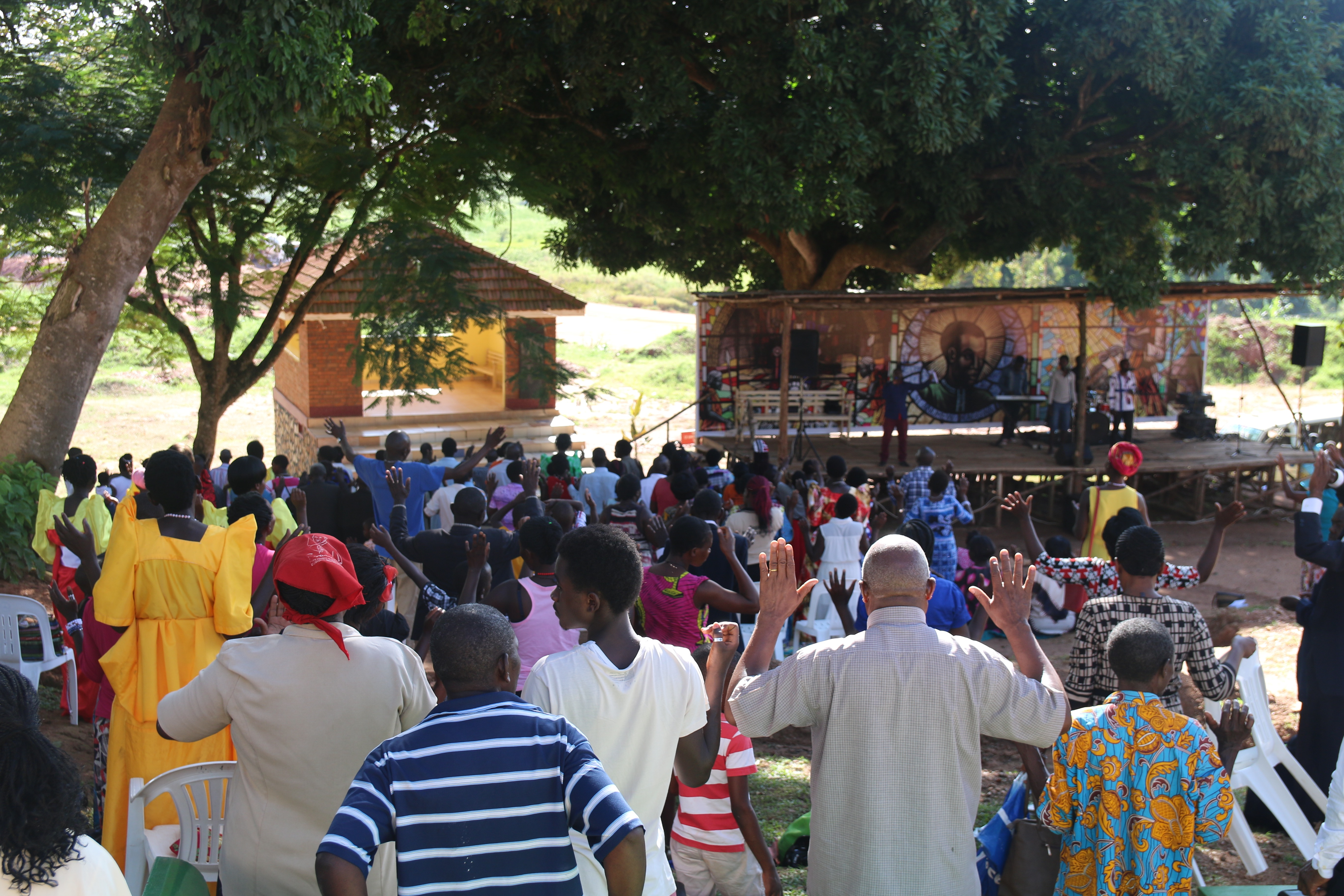
Open amphitheatre build on the tomb of St. Andrew at Munyonyo

According to Heike Behrend, following the deaths, the Catholic Church used the episode to make the victims the focus of a "cult of martyrs".In 1897 Archbishop Henri Streicher founded in Uganda the Uganda Martyrs Guild to participate in evangelization. Some chapters of the Guild became politicized in the 1950s. Under the influence of the Charismatic Movement, it later developed into an important anti-witchcraft movement in Tooro.

The honour paid to the Uganda martyrs elsewhere in Africa serves to Africanize Catholicism, as for instance in Senegal, where a church built in 1890 contains their relics and where there are several churches dedicated to Kizito, the youngest of their number.

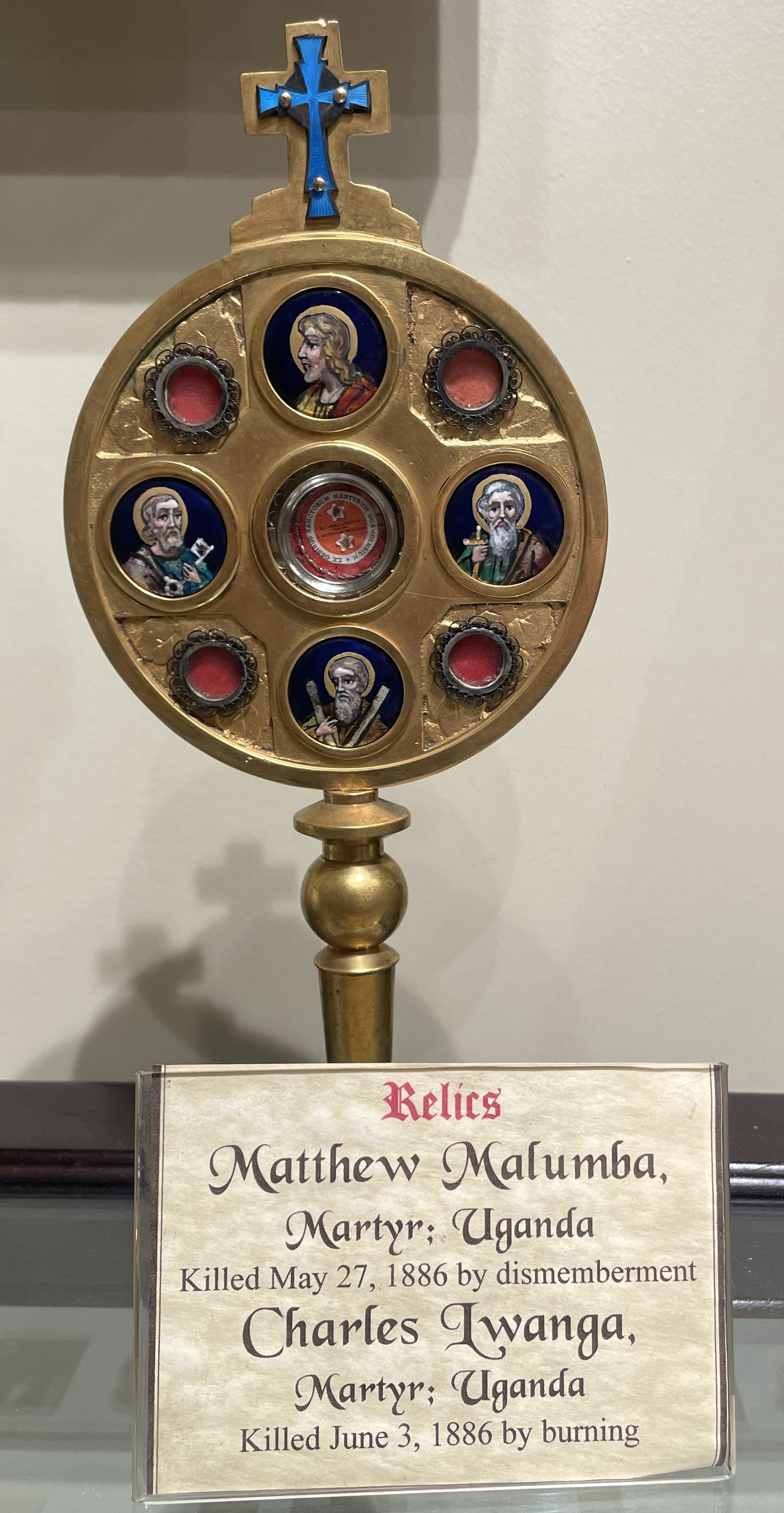
Reliquary holding relics of Charles Lwanga and other Ugandan Martyrs.

Pope Benedict XV beatified Charles Lwanga, Matiya Mulumba, and their twenty companions on 6 June 1920, and Pope Paul VI canonized them on 18 October 1964. In the ceremony of canonization of the Catholic martyrs, Pope Paul mentioned also the Anglicans, saying: "Nor, indeed, do we wish to forget the others who, belonging to the Anglican confession, confronted death in the name of Christ." The Papal Mass canonizing them is notable as the last time such was celebrated in the Tridentine form at St. Peter's Basilica. A set of postage stamps was issued in the following year by Vatican City for commemorating the canonization. A 3 June feast day of Charles Lwanga and the twelve others who died on 3 June 1886 is included in the General Roman Calendar, while the nine remaining martyrs are commemorated in the Roman Martyrology on their respective dates of death.

The Basilica of the Uganda Martyrs at Namugongo was built in 1968. Since the 1980s it has become the venue of massive pilgrimages, and plans for large-scale expansion were announced in 2014.

Santi Martiri dell'Uganda a Poggio Ameno, a church in Rome dedicated to the Ugandan Martyrs, was dedicated in 1980 and became a titular church in 1988.

In 1993, the Uganda Episcopal Conference established a university named after the Uganda Martyrs, which received its civil charter in 2005.

In 2014, Uganda celebrated 50 years since the Uganda Martyrs were canonized and elevated to sainthood by Pope Paul VI on 18 October 1964. The Munyonyo Martyrs Shrine is a thanksgiving monument for their canonization. Official groundbreaking was on 3 May 2015 by the Papal Nuncio to Uganda, Archbishop Michael A. Blume, and Cardinal Emmanuel Wamala. Re-development included construction of a new church shrine, museum, offices, and martyrdom spots of the saints.

=== List of the 22 Catholic martyrs ===
#	Name	Date of death	Age at death	Patron saint of	Killed by
1.	Achilleus Kewanuka	3 June 1886	17 years	journalists, press writers, printers and artist.	Fire (burnt)
2.	Adolphus Ludigo-Mukasa	3 June 1886	24 years	farmers and herdsmen	Fire (burnt)
3.	Ambrose Kibuuka Katekamu (Kateka Mulundaggana)	3 June 1886	18 years	societies and youth movements such as scouts, YCW, Xaverians etc.	Fire (burnt)
4.	Anatoli Kirigwajjo	3 June 1886		hunters and herdsmen	Fire (burnt)
5.	Andrew Kaggwa Kaahwa	26 May 1886	about 30 years	teachers, catechists and families	Panga and a knife
6.	Athanasius Bazzekuketa Kizza	27 May 1886	20 years	those in charge of finance, treasury and banks.	Spear
7.	Bruno Sserunkuuma	3 June 1886		alcoholic, the violent, those with lust of flesh and improper marriage.	Fire (burnt)
8.	Charles Lwanga	3 June 1886	25 years	African youth and Catholic action	Fire (burnt)
9.	Denis Ssebuggwawo Wasswa	25 May 1886	16 years	singers, musicians and choirs	hacked to death
10.	Gonzaga Gonza Nghonzabato	27 May 1886	24 years	prisoners, travellers, ill-treated and those in trouble.	Spear
11.	Gyavira Mayanja Musoke	3 June 1886	17 years	traffic communications and those troubled by witchcrafts	Fire (burnt)
12.	James Buuzabalyawo Kalumba Ssebayigga	3 June 1886	26 years	merchants and co-operatives	Fire (burnt)
13.	John Mary Kiwanuka Muzeeyi	27 January 1887		Panga	
14.	Joseph Mukasa Balikuddembe	15 November 1885	20 years	politicians and chiefs	Panga and fire
15.	Kizito	3 June 1886	13-14	young children particularly those below the age of 15	Fire (burnt)
16.	Luke (Lukka) Baanabakintu	3 June 1886	30 years	fishermen, sailors, mechanics, students and black-smiths.	Fire (burnt)
17.	Mathias Kalemba Mulumba Wante	30 May 1886	50 years	Chiefs and Families	Knife and Pangas
18.	Mbaaga Tuzinde	3 June 1886	17 years	vocations mainly of the seminarians, aspirants, postulants and novices	Stick and Fire
19.	Mugagga Lubowa	3 June 1886	16 years	clubs, community development, culture and home craft	Fire (burnt)
20.	Mukasa Kiriwawanvu	3 June 1886		hotels bars and restaurants	Fire (burnt)
21.	Noa Mawaggali	31 May 1886		the poor, technicians and the artists	Tied on the tree and dogs bit and then thrown on the road
22.	Ponsiano Ngondwe	26 May 1886	30 years	soldiers, policemen and militia	Spear

==== Two martyrs of Paimol ====
Blessed Daudi Okelo and Jildo Irwa
- Born: c.1900 (Daudi); 1906 (Jildo)
- Died: 18 October 1918, Paimol, Uganda
- Means of martyrdom: pierced with spears
- Venerated in: Catholic Church
- Beatified: 20 October 2002, by Pope John Paul II
- Feast: September 18

There were also two Ugandan martyrs of a later period, who died at Paimol in 1918 and were beatified in 2002. These have not yet been canonized.

The martyrs Daudi Okelo and Jildo Irwa were two young catechists from Uganda. They belonged to the Acholi tribe, a subdivision of the large Luo group. They lived and were martyred in the years immediately following the founding of the mission of Kitgum by the Comboni Missionaries in 1915.

== Anglicanism ==
The 23 Martyrs of Uganda are remembered in the Church of England with a commemoration on 3 June. When commemorating the martyrs of Uganda, the Church of England includes Archbishop Janani Luwum, who was murdered in 1977 by Idi Amin's henchmen; they also commemorate Luwum separately on 16 February.

List of the 23 Anglican martyrs
#	Name	Date of death and age	Killed using
1.	Makko Kakumba	31 January 1885	hacked and burnt
2.	Yusuf Rugalama	31 January 1885	hacked and burnt
3.	Mukasa Musa	25 May 1886	speared
4.	Mbwa Eriya	27 May 1886	castrated
5.	Muddu Aguma	2 May 1886	castrated
6.	Daudi Muwanga	1886	castrated
7.	Muwanga	31 May 1886	castrated
8.	Kayizzi Kibuuka	31 May 1886	castrated
9.	Mayanja Kitoogo	31 May 1886	castrated
10.	Nuwa Walukagga	3 June 1886	burnt
11.	Alexander Kadoko	3 June 1886	burnt
12.	Frederick Kizza	3 June 1886	burnt
13.	Robert Munyagabyangu	3 June 1886	burnt
14.	Danieri Nakabandwa	3 June 1886	burnt
15.	Kiwanuka Giyaza	3 June 1886	burnt
16.	Mukasa Lwakisiga	3 June 1886	burnt
17.	Charles Lwanga (Catholic but honoured in Anglicanism)	3 June 1886 at 25 years	burnt
18.	Mubi Azaalwa	3 June 1886	burnt
19.	Wasswa	25 May 1886	spear and knife
20.	Kwabafu	3 June 1886	burnt
21.	Kifamunnyanja	3 June 1886	burnt
22.	Muwanga Njigiya	3 June 1886	burnt
23.	Nuwa Sserwanga	31 January 1885	hacked and burnt

== Catholic hymns about the Uganda Martyrs ==
During Uganda Martyrs canonization day on 18 October 1964, a Ugandan choir of nearly 100 people, led by Joseph Kyagambiddwa, sang hymns about the Uganda Martyrs and their journey of faith. Joseph Kyagambiddwa wrote and composed 22 hymns about the Uganda marytrs.

The hymns and songs include;

- "Karoli Lwanga Wuuno Omulwanyi" (loosely translated as Lwanga, the invincible religious warrior).
- "Kizito Omuto ye wange" which is loosely translated as "Young Kizito is my own".
- "Abagalagala b'embuuza" which is loosely translated as "Where are the royal guards"
- "Mulinnya lya Patri" which is loosely translated as "In the name of the father"
- 1975 Marytrs anthem by Yusufu Byangwa.
- Mukulike Abazira by Godfrey Lubuulwa
- Bayuguuma Ekibuga by Pastor Simeon Kayiwa.
- Abajulizi by Kato Ssekandi.
- Abalamazi by Gabriel Bulindwa.
- Babalangaki by Gerald Kiweewa.
- Bakikola by John Ntale.
- Omulanga gwa Mapeera by Emmanuel Ssekidde.

== In popular culture ==
The Ugandan Martyrs were featured in one episode of the film Millions. In the DVD of the film it is mentioned that one of the actors who played the martyrs claimed to be a descendant of one of the martyrs. In 2015 Posta Uganda released a postage stamp set on the occasion of the 50th anniversary in 2014 of the canonization of the Uganda Martyrs.

== June 2025 Ugandan rebel suicide bombing ==
On 3 June 2025, two Ugandan rebels were killed when a female suicide bomber detonated her explosives near the Munyonyo Martyrs' Shrine just outside Kampala. The attack was during a celebration of Martyr's Day. The two rebels were the only individuals killed.

== Shrines ==
Uganda martyrs shrines in Uganda include:

- Basilica of the Uganda Martyrs, Namugongo
- Saint Andrew Kaggwa (Kahawa) shrine in Hoima District.
- Saint Anatole Kiriggwajjo shrine in Hoima District.
- Katoosa Martyrs Shrine in Kyenjojo District.
- Busega Martyrs Memorial
- Munyonyo Martyrs' Shrine

== See also ==
- The White Fathers Mission in Uganda
- Nabulagala Mapeera Church
- Rubaga Cathedral
- Katoosa Martyrs Shrine
- Namugongo
