= Joseph Mukasa Balikuddembe =

Ugandan Roman Catholic martyr

Saint Mukasa Balikuddembe
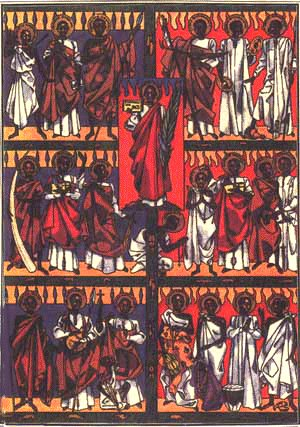
- Joseph Mukasa and his companions

Martyr
- Born: 1860; Buganda, Uganda
- Died: 15 November 1885; Nakivubo, Uganda
- Venerated in: Catholic Church
- Beatified: 1920 by Pope Benedict XV
- Canonized: 18 October 1964 by Pope Paul VI
- Major shrine: Basilica Church of the Uganda Martyrs, Namugongo
- Feast: 3 June
- Patronage: Chiefs, politicians

Joseph Mukasa Balikuddembe (1860 – 15 November 1885) was a Ugandan Catholic martyr and the majordomo at the court of Mwanga II of Buganda, recognized as a saint by the Catholic Church.

The Missionaries of Africa came to Uganda in 1879. Balikuddembe was enrolled as a catechumen in the following year and along with Andrew Kaggwa, was baptized by Père Simon Lourdel M.Afr. (Fr. Mapeera) on 30 April 1882. Balikuddembe took the baptismal name of "Joseph".

From November 1882 to July 1885 the Catholic missionaries, for reasons of security, abandoned the Ugandan mission and re-located temporarily to the southern end of Lake Victoria. In the absence of the missionaries, Balikuddembe was elected as the leader of the Christians.

King Mutesa was succeeded by his eighteen-year-old son, Danieri Mwanga II. Early in his reign, the new king began to crack down on Christian missionaries and converts in his country, and executed the British Anglican bishop James Hannington and his companions on October 29, 1885, ignoring Balikuddembe's pleas to spare the bishop. Godfrey Muwonge attributes this to the influence of Mwanga's Katikkiro (Prime Minister) Mukasa, who sought to control the spread of Christianity in Buganda by eliminating its teachers.

As catechumens, the recent converts could no longer engage in activities which they saw as unchristian. Mwanga saw this as insubordination.

As Mwanga's senior adviser, Balikuddembe spoke against the killing of the bishop. Mwanga viewed this a disrespectful. After a night-long interview the king condemned Balikuddembe to death. Muwonge says that the Katikkiro Musaka saw to it that the order was carried out before the king could change his mind. On 15 November 1885 Balikuddembe was taken to a place near the Nakivubo river where he was beheaded and his body thrown onto a pile of burning firewood. His duties were assumed by the young catechist Charles Lwanga.

== Veneration ==
Balikuddembe is remembered as first of the Martyrs of Uganda and is the patron of politicians and chiefs.

St. Joseph Mukasa Balikuddembe Parish is located in Kisoga.

== His family ==
Balikuddembe's father was Matia Mulumba from Jinja and his mother was a Mutoro.
