= Kizito (name) =

Name list

Kizito is a given name and surname. Notable people with the name include:

== Given name ==
- Saint Kizito (1872–1886), Ugandan martyr
- Kizito Maria Kasule (born 1967), Ugandan artist
- Kizito Keziron (born 1997), Ugandan footballer
- Kizito Mihigo (1981–2020), Rwandan singer
- Kizito Musampa, birth name of Kiki Musampa (born 1977), Congolese footballer

== Surname ==
- Fabian Kizito (born 1990), Ugandan footballer
- Gavin Kizito (born 2002), Ugandan footballer
- Geoffrey Kizito (born 1993), Ugandan footballer
- John Ssebaana Kizito (1934–2017), Ugandan politician
- Joseph Kizito, multiple people
- Kwame Kizito (born 1996), Ghanaian footballer
- Luwagga Kizito (born 1993), Ugandan footballer
- Manfred Kizito (born 1980), Ugandan footballer
- Muhamed Kizito (born 1974), Ugandan boxer
- Oliver Kizito (born 1988), Kenyan rugby player

== See also ==
- Renato Kizito Sesana (born 1943), Italian missionary also known as Father Kizito
- St. Kizito massacre
