= St. Denis Ssebugwawo Secondary School =

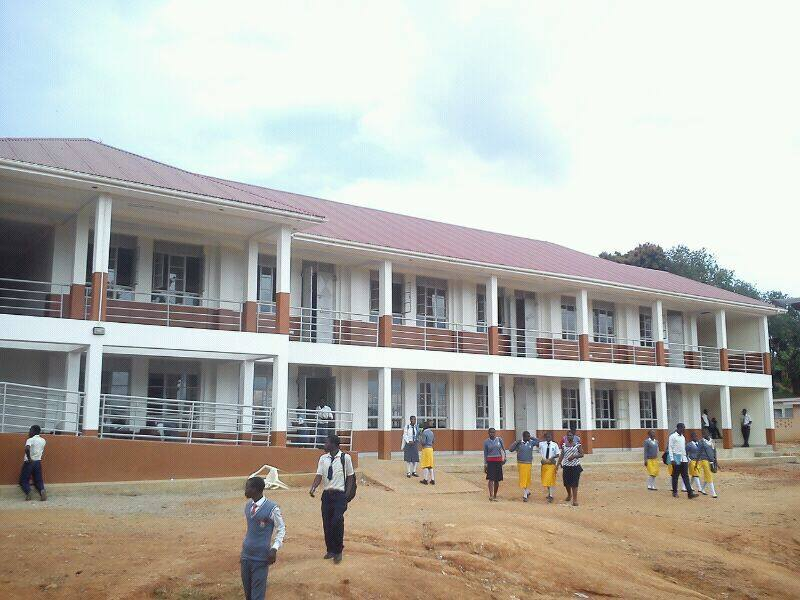

Location
- Ggaba, Kampala District; Uganda
- Coordinates: 0.2589°N 32.6280°E

Information
- Type: Government-aided day and boarding high school
- Motto: Harvest What You Sow
- Religious affiliation: Catholic Church
- Patron saint: Named for St. Denis Ssebugwawo
- Established: 1984 (42 years ago)
- Principal: Nassiwa Teddy Ddamulira
- Gender: Co-educational
- Enrollment: 1200
- Athletics: Major sports: athletics, basketball, chess, netball, soccer, volleyball

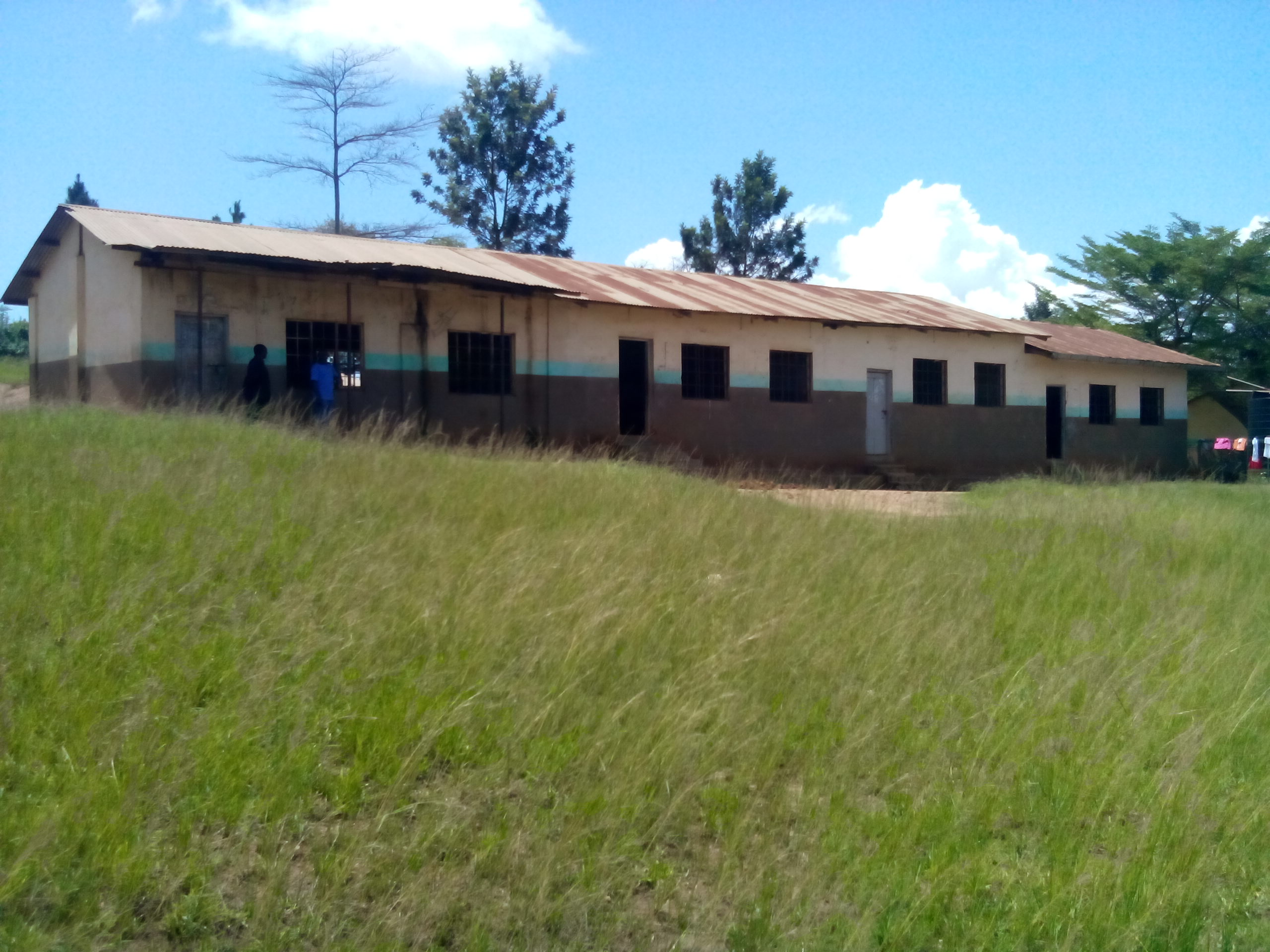
The building at Ggaba Demonstration Primary School where the school started.

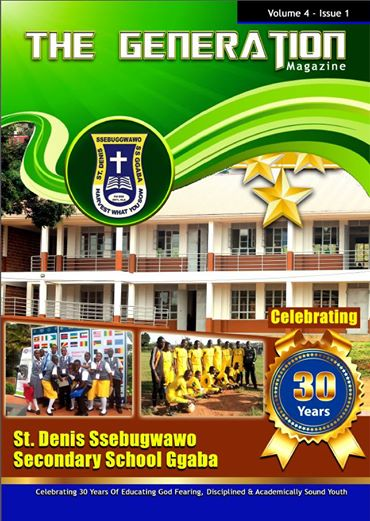
Celebration of the school's 30th anniversary

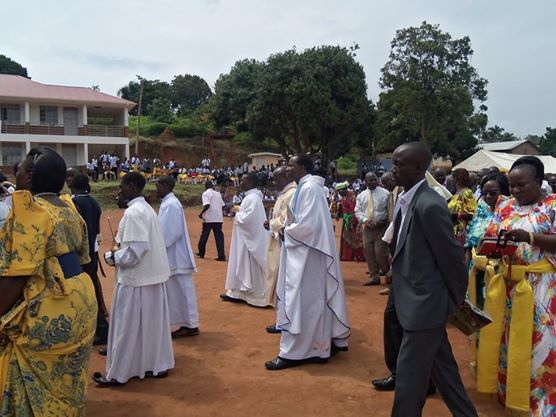
The school's teachers, parents and the Fathers

St. Denis Ssebugwawo Secondary School is a Ugandan mixed day and boarding school, located in Ggaba, Kampala District.

The school covers senior one to senior six classes. It is a Universal Secondary Education (U.S.E.) school, funded by the government and the Catholic Church.

The school is named after St. Denis Ssebugwawo, one of the Uganda Martyrs.

== Location ==
The school is located in Ggaba, approximately 7 miles (11 kilometres) south of Kampala, Uganda's capital and largest city. The school grounds cover an area of 8 acres (0.032 km^{2}) on the main road to Ggaba opposite the junction to Munyonyo. The school is located one kilometer from the Ggaba landing site.

== History ==
The school was started in 1984, at the same time as other schools including Kitebi S.S., Kalinabiri S.S., Luzira S.S. and Kawempe Muslim S.S.

Until 1991, the school was located at Ggaba Demonstration Primary School. The school shifted to its present site when St. Karoli Lwanga Catholic Church Ggaba offered seven acres of land to the school.

== Curriculum ==
The school follows the curriculum provided by the Ministry of Education and Sports through the National Curriculum Development Centre (NCDC). It provides both Ordinary Level and Advanced Level teaching.

The subjects taught at O-Level include:

- Biology
- Chemistry
- Physics
- Mathematics
- Geography
- History
- Christian religious education (C.R.E.)
- Agriculture
- English language
- Commerce
- Literature
- Fine art
- Luganda
- Islamic Religious Education
- Music
- Computer studies
- Kiswahili
- Physical education

The subjects taught at A-Level include:

- Geography
- History
- Divinity
- Entrepreneurship
- Economics
- Luganda
- Literature
- Fine art
- General paper
- Functional computing
- Biology
- Physics
- Mathematics
- Agriculture
- Subsidiary mathematics

At A-level, students can choose a maximum of three subjects as a combination.

== See also ==
- Education in Uganda
- List of boarding schools
- List of schools in Uganda
- Roman Catholicism in Uganda
