= Renato Kizito Sesana =

Italian missionary

Renato "Kizito" Sesana (born 1943) is an Italian Comboni missionary, journalist and humanitarian worker. He is well known for his work to rescue the street children of Nairobi.

== Early life ==
Renato Sesana was born in Lecco, Italy in 1943. In 1962, he graduated with a junior degree in mechanical engineering, and went to work at the famous Moto Guzzi factory in nearby Mandello del Lario.

Sesana entered the novitiate of the Comboni Missionaries in Gozzano, Italy, in 1964. He later studied theology for four years at Venegono Superiore and was ordained a Catholic priest in 1970. He assumed the name 'Kizito', after Saint Kizito (the youngest of the Uganda Martyrs, who was canonized by Pope Paul VI in 1964).

In the early 1970s, Sesana worked for Nigrizia, a prestigious Comboni magazine, of which he was the youngest editor ever, in more than a hundred years history of the magazine. He was appointed its editor between 1973 and 1975, during which period he began to travel around Africa, writing and taking pictures.

In 1975, Sesana studied English in the United States, living at the Holy Cross Parish in Los Angeles, California. He returned to Italy the following year and in 1977 graduated in political science from the University of Padua, Italy. His thesis focused on African Americans in the Catholic Church.

== Missionary and Humanitarian Work in Africa ==
Father Kizito’s missionary work in Africa started when he was assigned to Zambia in 1977. He served in a rural parish for three years before moving to the capital, Lusaka. Assigned to a poor slum area called Bauleni, Father Kizito worked especially with the youth and started a lay community called Koinonia. In this period, in collaboration with the theologian Valentino Salvoldi, he wrote a book calling for an African Synod, “Africa: the Gospel Belong to Us” which was later published also in Italian and Portuguese.

In February 1988, he was sent by his congregation to Nairobi, Kenya, to set up the New People, a Comboni magazine for Anglophone African countries. The first issue of the magazine was published in July 1989, and Father Kizito was its editor up to 1995. It is still one of the most widely spread Catholic magazines in Anglophone Africa.

Once in Nairobi, he started a lay community in Kenya, also called Koinonia, with a group of young men whose inspiration was the life of the early biblical Christians as recorded in the Acts of the Apostles. The Community members were from different professions and backgrounds, and they lived together sharing their dreams, successes and failures. Today, the Koinonia Community has about forty members in Nairobi, and ten in Lusaka.

Koinonia Kenya was registered as a corporate body in 1996, after which it established various social enterprises to help improve the local society within which it is based. Its activities and social projects give priority on the marginalized in society, such as children in difficult circumstances – especially street children – as well as women and young people from poor backgrounds.

Apart from the Nairobi and Lusaka projects, the Community has since spread to the Nuba Mountains of Sudan, where a sister community, Koinonia Nuba, used to run two primary schools and a teachers' training college. The present war has caused the closure of the project, but a secondary school in Yida refugee camp for the Nuba people in South Sudan is supported by Koinonia. However the Sudan Catholic Bishops' Conference disowned his work in Sudan. In a letter dated 31 August 1999 addressed “To whom it may concern”, Archbishop Paulino Lukudu Loro, the President of SCBC, wrote on behalf of the bishops: "It came to our knowledge that Father Kizito raises funds for the Nuba Mountains by presenting projects to church or church-related organisations. Father Kizito is not assigned to any of our dioceses. Consequently he has no authorisation whatsoever to raise funds in our name and/or in the name of our respective dioceses... We are also concerned that in the past Father Kizito has issued public statements about the situation in Sudan. We emphasise that he is not authorised by the Bishops to speak as the voice of Church..."

Beyond his missionary and humanitarian work, Father Kizito is an acclaimed writer and journalist. He has written several books and hundreds of articles for magazines and papers around the world. He wrote a weekly column called "Father Kizito's Notebook" from 1995 to 2001, in the Sunday edition of the Daily Nation, which is Kenya’s most widely read newspaper.

In 1999, the Episcopal Conference of Kenya instructed him to plan and set up Waumini Radio, a national Catholic FM station. The station began broadcasting in July 2003, and Father Kizito ran it until early 2006.

Father Kizito has also inspired and supported the establishment of Newsfromafrica.org, an electronic news bulletin that publishes articles written from the perspective of the African grassroots people in their struggle for freedom, dignity and justice.

Among other initiatives, he has helped set up Peacelink-Africa, a portal on African initiatives for peace, and The Big Issue The Big Issue Kenya, which was the country's first street newspaper, but which was forced to close for financial problems after three years of operation.

Currently, Father Kizito continues to actively support and promote the various Koinonia initiatives, especially the Community's street children rehabilitation projects in Nairobi and Lusaka, as well as the activities of SYDI (Sports for Youth Development Initiative) and NAREC (Nairobi Recyclers) two NGOs born out of Koinonia.

At the end of 2015 Koinonia manages in Nairobi seven children and youth homes, a secondary school, two higher education institutions, two community radio stations, and Shalom House, a centre for justice and peace with modern residential facilities. In Lusaka hosts in the same location a children and youth home, a secondary school, while a public library and an organic agricultural training centre are under construction.

He also continues to write widely. He has so far authored 14 books and, since January 2008 has a blog called A Life in Africa. He also writes for the Italian web magazine The Post Internazionale. .

== Sexual abuse allegations ==
He has been accused of sexually abusing of young African males. He strongly denied them, saying the properties of the Koinonia Community were the real targets of the people behind the accusations. On December 1, 2010 Kenya Attorney General declared that there was no sufficient evidence to prosecute him. All the key witnesses have so far retracted their statements and admitted of having been given money to accuse him.

In June 2010, Father Kizito filed three cases for defamation, against three Kenyan mass media for biased reporting.

== Awards ==
1997: Raul Follereau Award
2002: Vita Nova Prize
2002: Altropallone Award He has been awarded for his commitment in the sponsorship of clean, fair and liable sport activities. He promoted the manufacturing of fair-trade footballs by Nairobi's Amani Yassets Sports Club and intended to bring back soccer and other sports as a mean of joy and fellowship.
2011: City of Sasso Marconi Journalism Award
2012: Regione Lombardia Peace Prize
2015: Ethical Award awarded by Associazione Culturale Plana to him and the film director Ermanno Olmi e the Uruguay president José "Pepe" Mujica
