= Yida =

Yida may refer to:

- Yida, South Sudan, a settlement and refugee camp
- Yida Group, a Chinese real-estate developer (Chinese: 亿达)
- Yida Huang, a Singaporean singer and songwriter (simplified Chinese: 义达; traditional Chinese: 義達)
- Yuan Yida, a Chinese scientist (Chinese: 义达)
