= Lwanga =

Lwanga is a surname. Notable people with the surname include:

- Anthony Lwanga (born 1972), Kenyan footballer
- Charles Lwanga (1860–1886), Ugandan convert to the Catholic Church
- Cyprian Kizito Lwanga (1953–2021), Ugandan prelate
- Elizabeth Lwanga, Ugandan activist
- Jonah Lwanga (1945–2021), Ugandan prelate
- Jimmy Lwanga, Ugandan politician
- Taddeo Lwanga (born 1994), Ugandan footballer
