= Koinonia (disambiguation) =

Koinonia may refer to:

- Koinonia, a Greek word
- Koinonia (monasteries), a network of Christian monasteries in Upper Egypt founded by Pachomius the Great during the 4th century A.D.
- Koinonia (band), a Christian jazz band
- Koinonia Christian Fellowship, a church in Bloomingdale, Ontario
- Koinonia Partners, an intentional community in Sumter County, Georgia
- Koinonia Community, a humanitarian organization in Africa
- Airdrie Koinonia Christian School, in Airdrie, Alberta
