= Munyonyo =

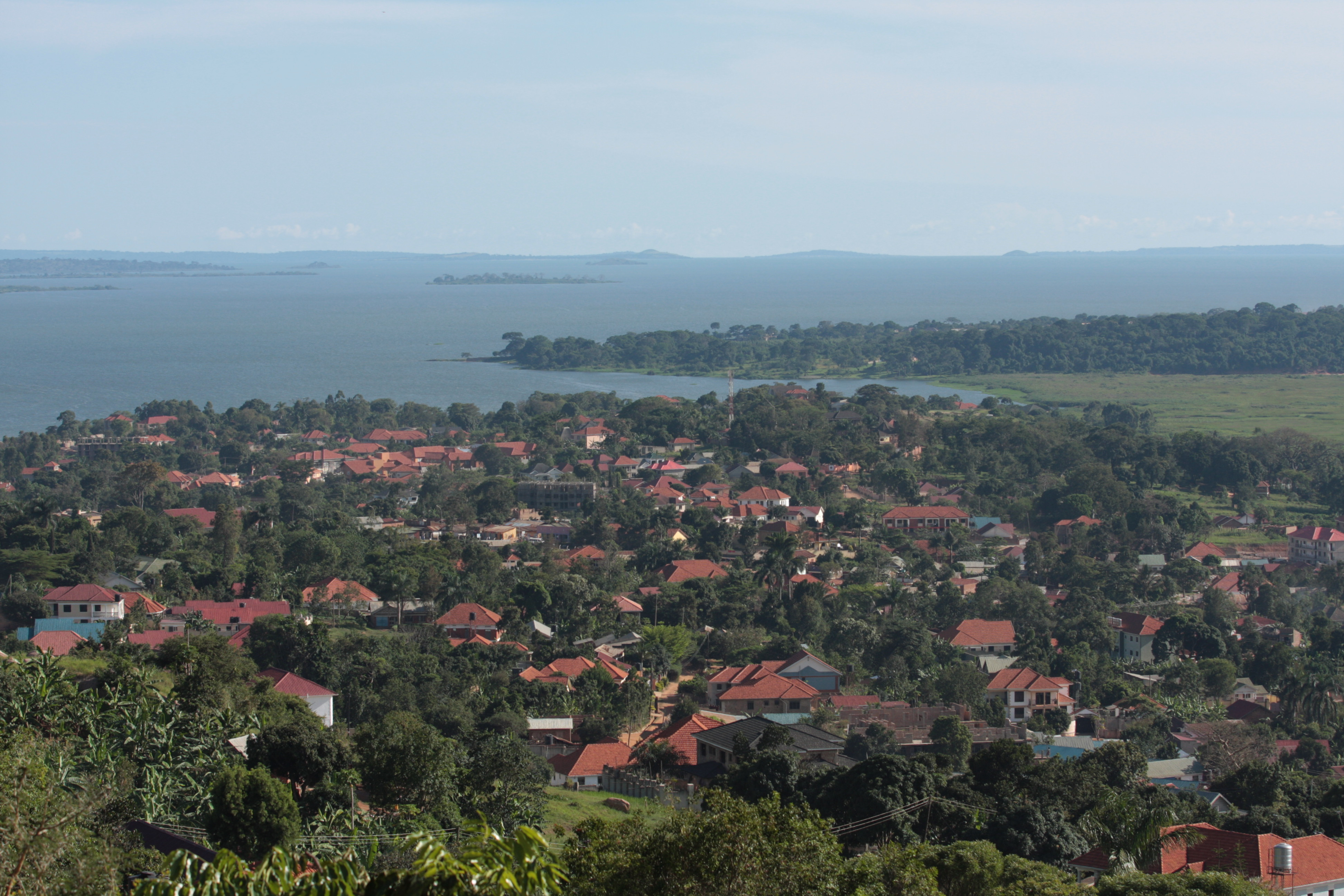
- Munyonyo

- Location within Uganda
- Coordinates: 00°14′32″N 32°37′29″E
- Country: Uganda
- Region: Central Region of Uganda
- District: Kampala Capital City Authority
- Division: Makindye Division
- Elevation: 1,160 m (3,810 ft)
- Time zone: UTC+3 (EAT)

Munyonyo is an area on the northern shores of Lake Victoria and part of the metropolitan area of Kampala, in Makindye Division.

== Location ==
Munyonyo is bordered by Lake Victoria to the south, Bulingugwe Island to the southeast, Ggaba to the east, Salaama to the northeast, Buziga to the north, Makindye to the northwest, and Lubowa to the west. Munyonyo is approximately 13 kilometres (8.1 mi), by road, southeast of Kampala's central business district. The coordinates of Munyonyo are 0°14'32.0"N 32°37'29.0"E (Latitude:0.242225; Longitude:32.624725).

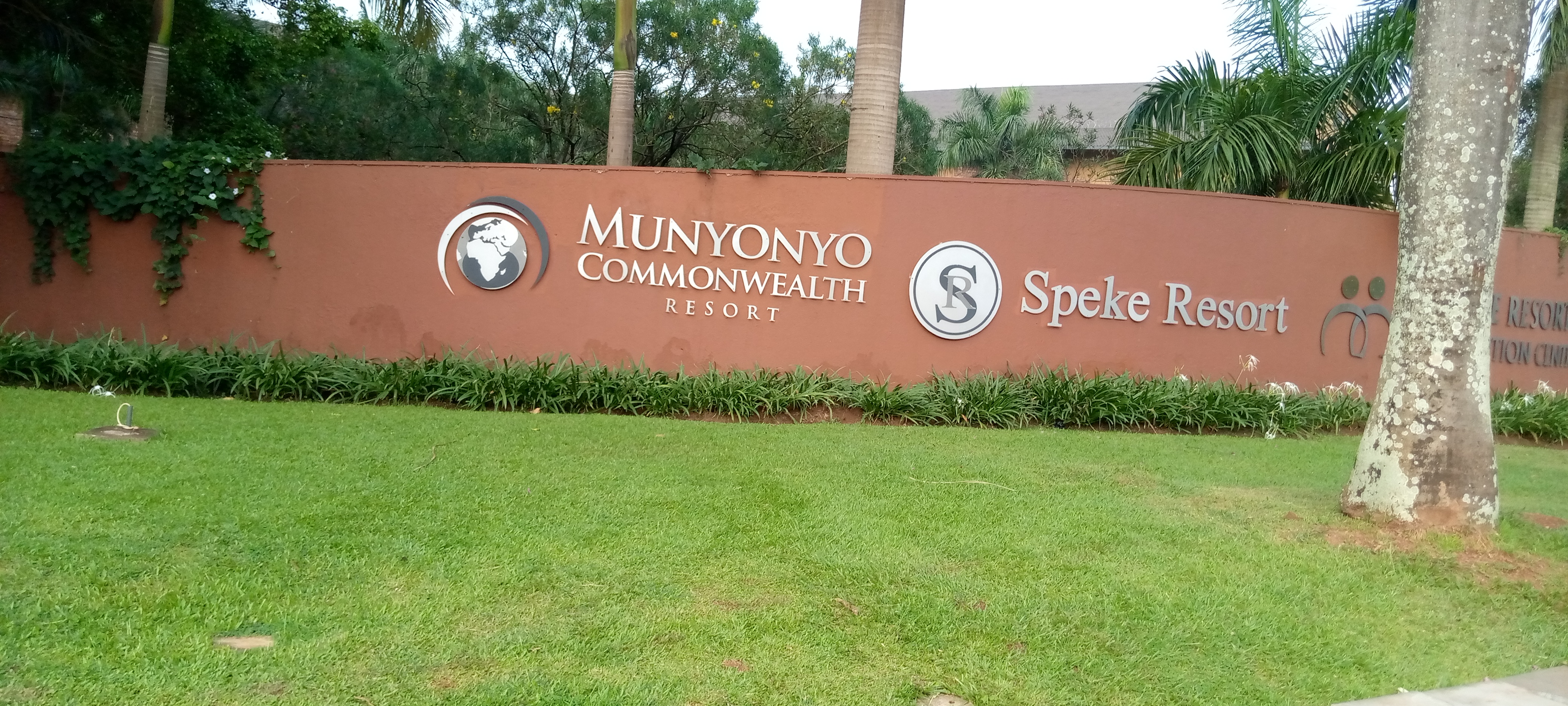
Speke Resort Munyonyo

== Overview ==
Munyonyo is one of the most upscale residential neighborhoods in the city of Kampala. It is the location of two of Kampala's resorts: the Speke Resort and Conference Center and the Commonwealth Resort. The latter was the venue of the 2007 Commonwealth Heads of Government Meeting, also known as the Commonwealth Heads of Government Meeting 2007.

Munyonyo is also a martyrdom spot of the Uganda Martyrs. Catholic saints Andrew Kaggwa and Denis Ssebuggwawo Wasswa and Anglican Mukasa Musa were murdered on 25 and 26 May 1886 by King Mwanga II of Buganda. Other martyrs were imprisoned in Munyonyo and taken for execution in Namugongo. On the same day in Munyonyo, four catechumens: Kizito, Gyaviira Musoke, Mbaga Tuzinde, and Mugagga Lubowa were secretly baptized by Charles Lwanga, at that time the leader of Uganda's Christian community.

== Landmarks ==
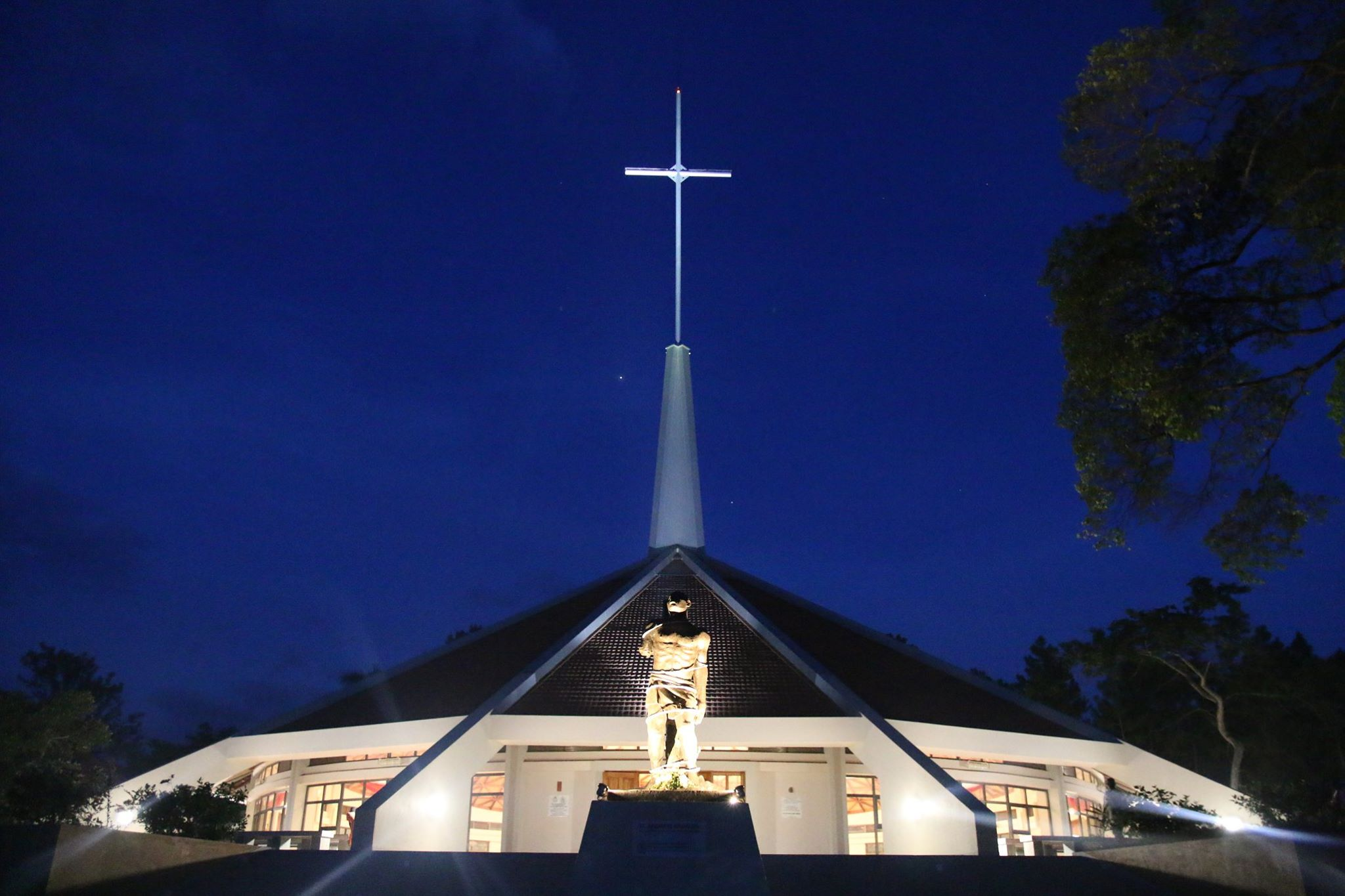
Basilica and Martyrdom spot of St. Andrew Kaggwa

Landmarks in or near Munyonyo include:

- Munyonyo Martyrs Shrine, a catholic basilica with the execution spot of Saint Denis Ssebuggwawo Wasswa and the tomb of Saint Andrew Kaggwa
- public health clinic administered by the Kampala Capital City Authority
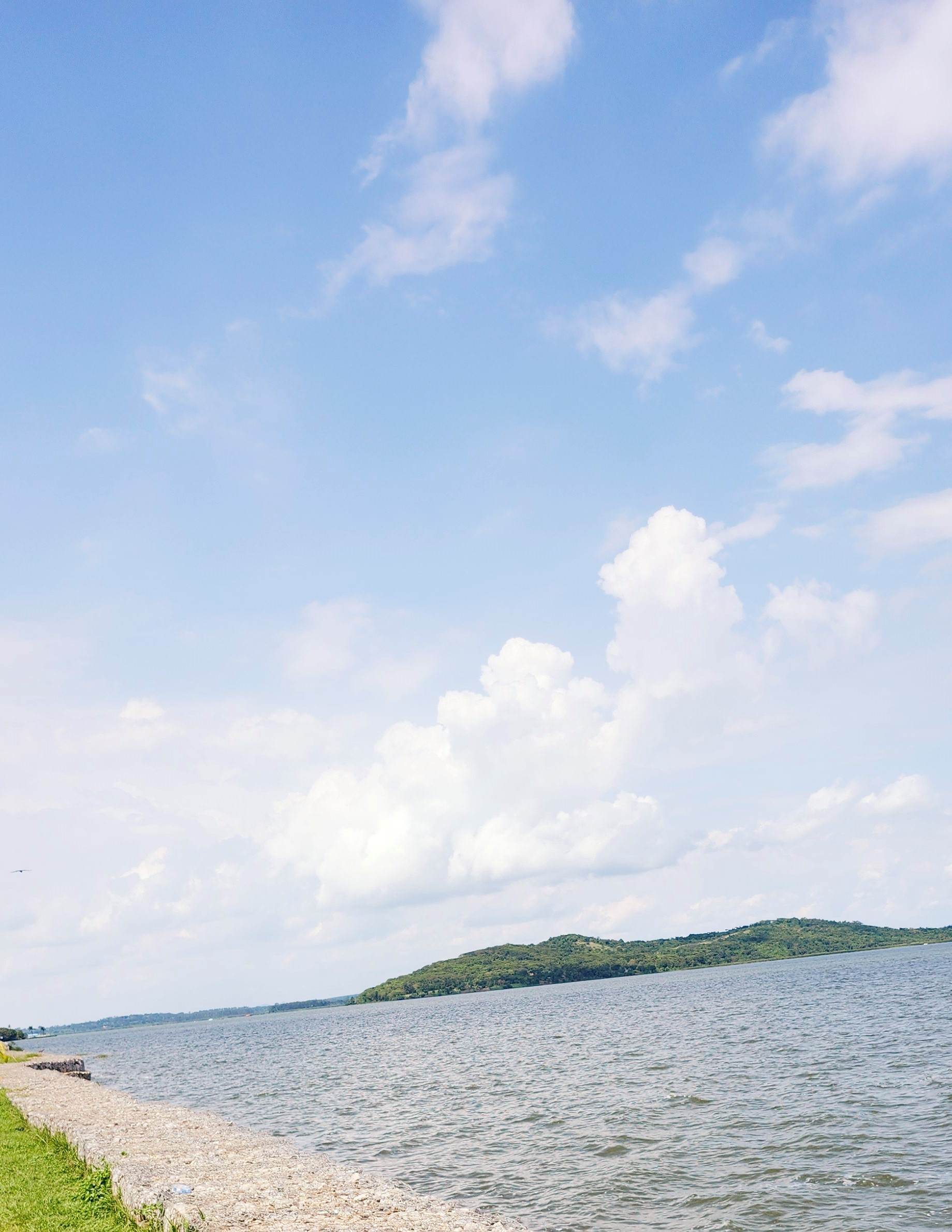
- Lake Victoria as seen from Munyonyo Speke Resort 2025
  Speke Resort Munyonyo

== See also ==
- Ggaba
- National Water and Sewerage Corporation
- Entebbe-Kampala Highway
