= Nuba Relief, Rehabilitation and Development Organisation =

Sudanese humanitarian organization

The Nuba Relief, Rehabilitation and Development Organisation (NRRDO) is a Sudanese humanitarian organization, which was focal in delivering aid to the Nuba people during the Second Sudanese Civil War and the Sudanese conflict in South Kordofan and Blue Nile.

NRRDO was first established in 1993 but became fully operational in 1995. The organization was originally named The Nuba Relief, Rehabilitation and Development Society (NRRDS) but was changed to the current name in the year 2000. Yousif Kuwa was heavily involved with the NRRDO which provides the people of the Nuba Mountains with food, cooking oil, clothing and education. On 26 of May, 2014 NRRDO headquarters were bombed by the government of Sudan damaging the compound. The NRRDO has its headquarters in Kauda and a liaison office in Nairobi. Current executive director for NRRDO is Ali Shamilla, Previous executive directors have been Najwa Musa Konda and el-Lazim Suleiman el-Basha.
