= Bulingugwe Island =

Island in Lake Victoria, Uganda

- Interactive map of Bulingugwe Island

Geography
- Location: Lake Victoria
- Coordinates: 00°13′25″N 32°37′48″E
- Length: 3.52 km (2.187 mi)

Administration
- Uganda
- Region: Central Region

Additional information
- Time zone: EAT (UTC+3)

Bulingugwe Island is a small island in northern Lake Victoria. It is about 6 miles (10 km) south of Kampala, Uganda.

After the Battle of Mengo Hill in which the Uganda Army raided the Lubiri Palace on 24 January 1892, the Kabaka (King) Mwanga II of Buganda fled to exile there briefly.

== Geography and setting ==
Bulingugwe Island lies at about 0°13′26″N, 32°37′49″E. GeoView lists a length of 3.52 kilometres. Mindat records alternate names in use, including “Bulinguge Island” and “Bulingugu Island”, and lists the local Köppen climate type as Af (tropical rainforest).

Munyonyo is described as bordering the island to the southeast in local geography descriptions of the area.

== History ==
During political and religious conflict in Buganda in 1892, Kabaka Mwanga II took refuge on Bulingugwe Island after fighting around Mengo. A contemporary mission account also refers to Mwanga staying on Bulingugwe during the period when assistance was sought from the Imperial British East Africa Company.

A Daily Monitor retrospective describes an attack on Bulingugwe Island on 30 January 1892 during the same conflict, reporting heavy loss of life and linking events to military activity based around Munyonyo on the mainland shore.

== Later use ==
A Daily Monitor feature links Bulingugwe Island to military demonstrations during Idi Amin’s presidency, including an account describing a 1975 demonstration staged for visiting delegates during the Organisation of African Unity summit in Kampala. The same report describes a reinforced concrete “escape boat” built for Amin on the island around 1977–1978, which reportedly sank during launch.

== Access ==
A Daily Monitor report describes Bulingugwe Island as roughly 30 minutes by boat from Cape Villa in Munyonyo, a lakeshore area in Kampala.

== See also ==
- Lake Victoria
- Munyonyo
- Buganda Kingdom
