= Ggaba =

- Map of Kampala showing the location of Ggaba.
- Coordinates: 00°15′23″N 32°38′10″E
- Country: Uganda
- Region: Central Uganda
- District: Kampala Capital City Authority
- Division: Makindye Division
- Elevation: 1,140 m (3,740 ft)
- Time zone: UTC+3 (EAT)

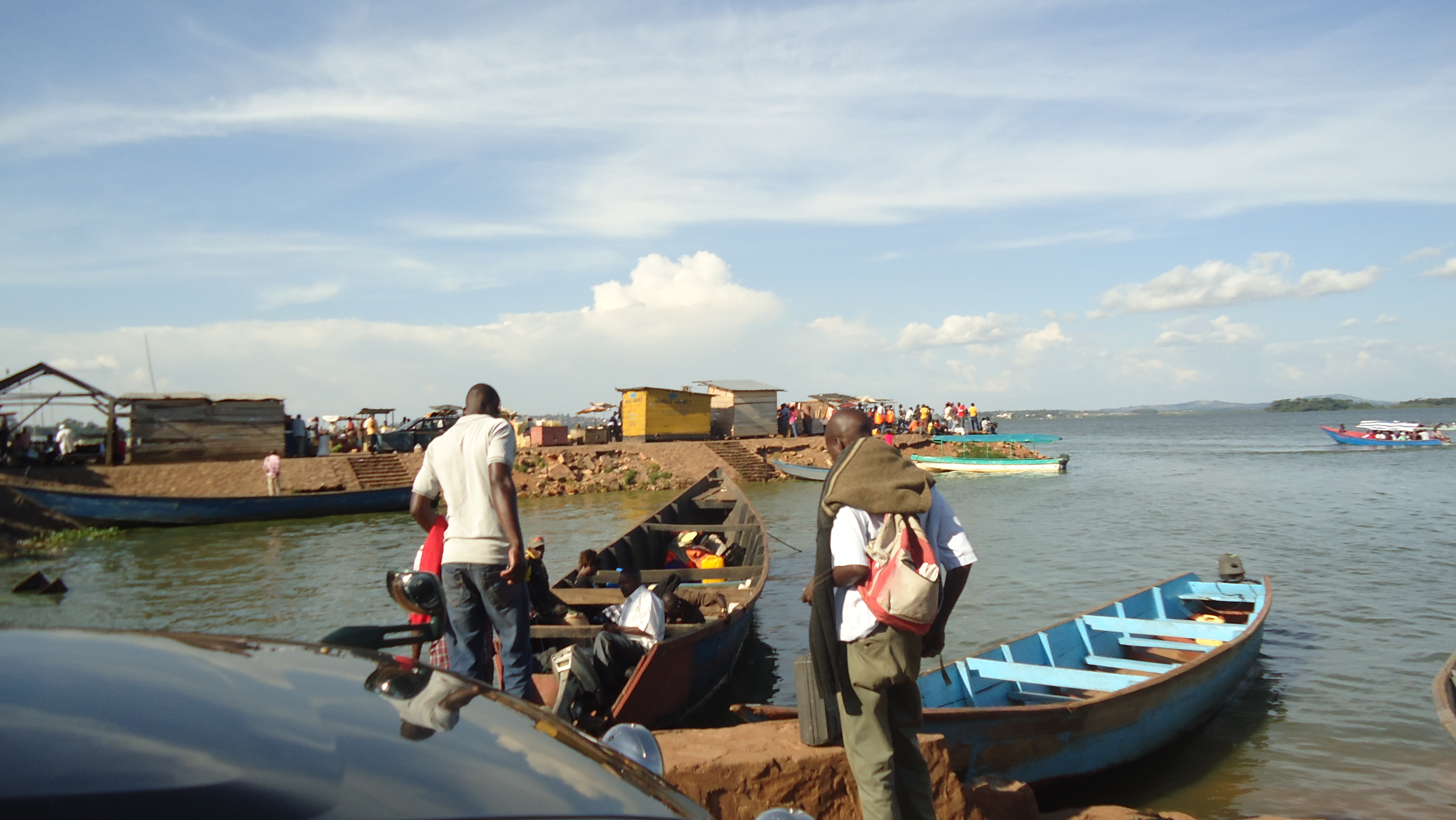
Ggaba landing site.

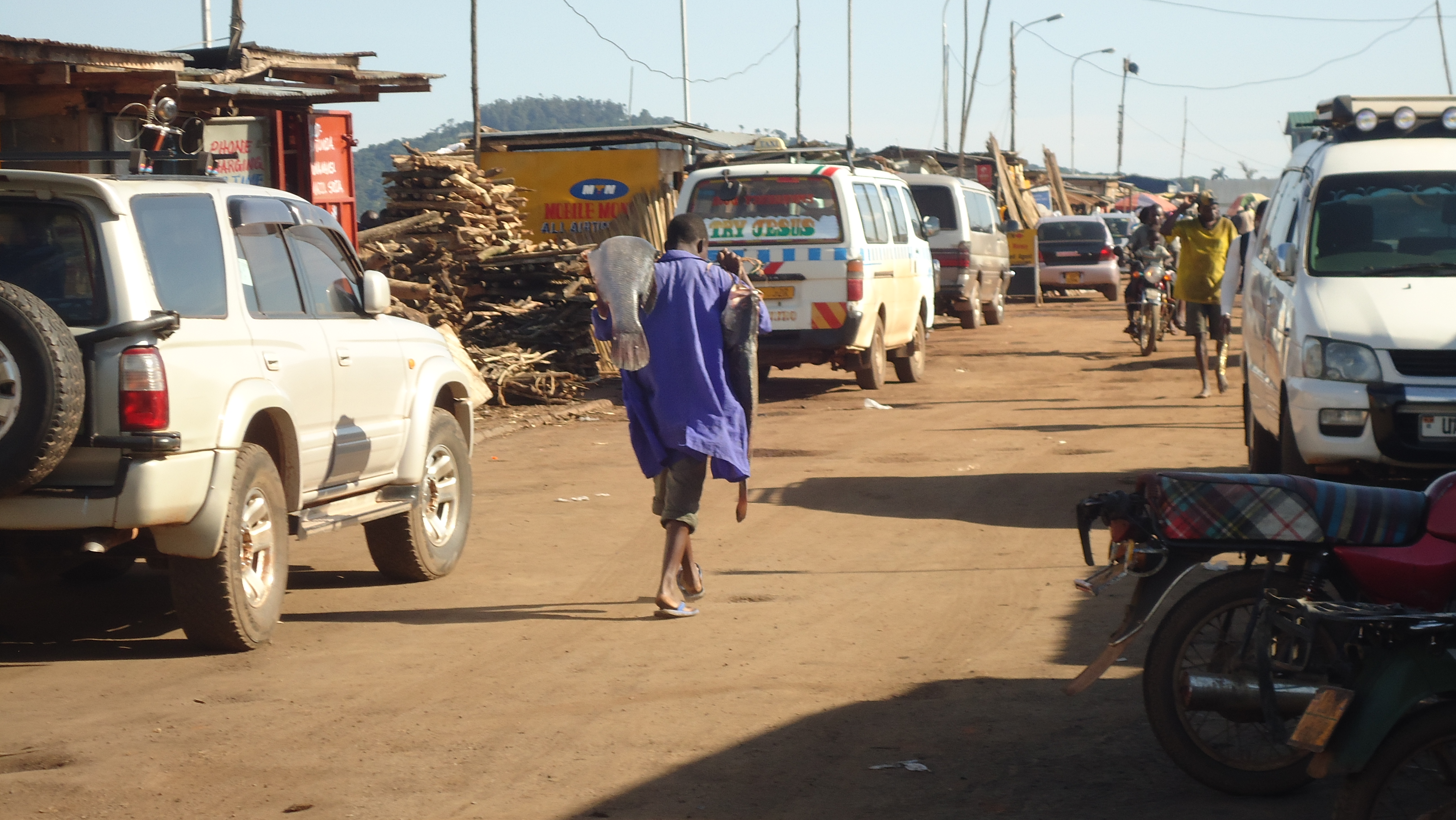
Fisherman with nile perch at Gaba landing site.

Ggaba is a neighborhood within the city of Kampala in the Central Region of Uganda.

== Location ==
Ggaba is located on the northern shores of Lake Victoria, at the southern tip of the city of Kampala. Ggaba is generally a low topography area, It is bordered by Murchison Bay in Lake Victoria to the south and east, the village of Kawuku to the northeast, Bbunga to the north, Buziga to the northwest and Munyonyo to the southwest. It lies in Makindye Division, one of the five administrative burroughs of the city.

The road distance between Ggaba and Kampala's central business district is approximately 11 kilometres (7 mi). The coordinates of Ggaba are:0°15'23.0"N, 32°38'10.0"E (Latitude:0.256390; Longitude:32.636113).

== Overview ==
Ggaba can be divided into the following major areas:

=== Lake shore ===
This is the southeastern part of Ggaba and includes: (1) A small beach (2) A landing dock for fishing boats (3) A fish market (4) A shopping center (5) A commercial resort with a private beach (6) Several bars and night spots.

=== Ggaba Water Works ===
This is located in the southwestern part of the area and contains: (1) The pumping stations (I, II and III) of National Water and Sewerage Corporation (NWSC). The intake pumps that supply water to Kampala, Kira Municipality and Mukono are located here. (2) The Main Water Treatment Plant of NWSC (3) Houses for the blue-collar workers of NWSC (4) Ggaba Police Station.

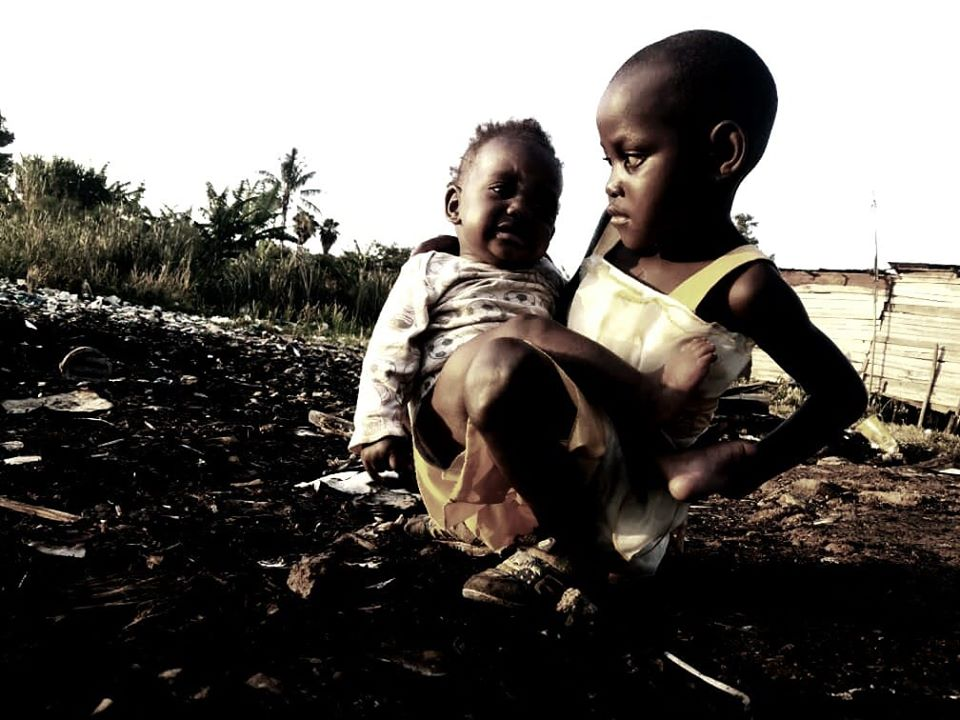
Little girl taking care of her young sister in a slum.

=== Educational community ===
This area is mainly located in the northern part of the neighborhood. The institutions include: (1) The main campus of Kampala University (2) Ggaba National Seminary (Catholic) (3) Ggaba Teachers Training Institute (4) St. Denis Ssebugwawo Secondary School (5) The Bunga campus of King Cesar University (6) Bbunga Primary School (7) Bbunga Islamic School.

=== Residential areas ===
Interspersed between the schools, universities and teaching institutions are the residential areas. The areas in the southern and western parts of Ggaba are generally of low income housing while those further north and east are upscale because they offer a better view of the lake.

=== Medical institutions ===
(1) Jacky Medical Centre, is located at the northern tip of Ggaba (2) Wentz Medical Centre, is located in the northeastern part of Ggaba, close to Kampala University. (3) Martyrs Family Clinic, is located in the southern part of Ggaba, close to the NWSC Staff Houses. (4) Ggaba Community Health Centre, is located in the southern part of Ggaba, inside the low income residential area close to the NWSC Water Treatment Plant.

== Kansanga-Ggaba Road ==
In 2013 the Uganda Police informed the public that according to police's observation, about one in every ten vehicles travelling on that road at that time, was operated by a person who was under the influence of alcohol.

== See also ==
- St.Denis Ssebugwawo Secondary School
- Kampala
- Munyonyo
- Kabalagala
- Kansanga
- Makindye Division
- Kampala University
