= Yousif Kuwa =

Sudanese politician

Yousif Kawa Mekki
- یوسف كوة مكي
- Born: 1945; Jabal Miri, British Sudan
- Died: 31 March 2001 (aged 55–56); Norwich, United Kingdom
- Spouse(s): Fatuma; Hannan; Ummasar
- Children: 14
- Military career
- Allegiance: SPLA
- Conflicts: Second Sudanese War

Yousif Kuwa Mekki (Arabic: یوسف كوة مكي; 1945 – 2001) was a Sudanese revolutionary, rebel commander and politician.

== Early life ==
Yousif Kuwa was born in 1945 at Jebel Miri, a locality in the Nuba Mountains of Central Sudan. A member of the Miri sub-tribe, he was named Kuwa after his father and Mekki after his grandfather. As with most rural Sudanese, his exact birthday is not recorded. Kuwa’s father was a soldier, and the family moved around the country, resulting in Kuwa growing up with little knowledge of his ethnic Nuba heritage. He was raised as a Muslim.

== Early political activism ==
Kuwa was raised a Muslim, and actually grew up believing he was an Arab. Although a brilliant student, Kuwa's Arab secondary school headmaster made a comment that changed the course of his life, saying, while justifying the unnecessity of education for Nuba children: "What is the use of teaching Nuba, who are going to work as servants in houses?" This racist comment made Kuwa aware of his identity as a marginalized Nuba, and inspired revolutionary ideas in him when he later studied political science at Khartoum University.

At the University, Kuwa was strongly influenced by the ideas of Tanzania's first president Julius Nyerere, the African history of Sudan and about the Nuba cultures. Together with other Nuba students he formed “Komolo”, a Youth movement to strengthen cultural and political awareness among the Nuba, in 1975. He then found work as a teacher after graduation, teaching in Darfur and in the Nuba Mountains, before being elected to the Southern Kordofan regional assembly in 1981.

Working amongst his people, Kuwa began to understand the real nature of the conflict in Sudan. Although a country with a multi-racial, multi-religious and multi-language society, he judged that the politics of Sudan upheld a dichotomy between marginalized and the privileged. Branded a firebrand by the Khartoum government and unable to agitate for the rights of the suppressed Nuba people as a democratically elected representative, Kuwa joined the rebel Sudan People's Liberation Army (SPLM/A) insurgency led by Dr. John Garang after reading the SPLA manifesto in 1984, as Sudan slipped into civil war.

== SPLA commander and Nuba leader ==
Between 1985 and 1986, Kuwa was sent for military training in Ethiopia. He was then appointed to join the SPLM/SPLA Political-Military High Command, and was sent to Cuba for advanced political and military training.

Upon return, he became a commander in the SPLA, 10th in rank after John Garang, Kerubino Kuanyin Bol, William Nyuon Bany, Salva Kiir, Arok Thon Arok, Nyaciluk Nyachigak, John Kulang, Riek Machar and Lam Akol. Others in the SPLA High Command included James Wani Igga, Daniel Awet Akot, and Kuol Manyang Juuk.

When the SPLA-Nasir split from the SPLA in 1991, Kuwa rose in rank because he was one of those who stood with Garang's dominant faction.

Kuwa returned to Sudan in 1987, and was assigned, with a battalion of about 1,000 SPLA guerilla fighters, to penetrate the Nuba Mountains.

Under Kuwa’s command, the SPLA forces overran most of the Nuba Mountains in 1989. The locals received him enthusiastically as he traversed the region, explaining the SPLA’s cause and asking for their co-operation.

Soldiers abusing civilians risked the firing squad, and in 1990, Kuwa, now the SPLA-appointed governor of the Nuba Mountains, introduced self-government, where the Nuba elected their village leaders, district representatives and county administrators. Kuwa became very popular among the Nuba, who did not fear him, but revered him for his charisma and wisdom.

Unable to defeat the SPLA in direct confrontations, the Khartoum military directed its violence against the civilian population and sealed off the Nuba Mountains. For 16 years, the Nuba suffered relentless attacks from government forces. Warplanes bombed the area sporadically, hundreds of villages were shelled or burned, thousands were killed and tens of thousands subjected to famine.

Faced with the despair of the Nuba people, Kuwa in 1992 convened an Advisory Council forum, asking the representatives to choose whether to continue with the liberation war or surrender to the government. After two days of heated debates the Council voted to carry on with the armed struggle. In 1994, Kuwa's political star within the SPLM/A rose when he organized and chaired a National Liberation Council of the rebel movement, which voted to establish civil administrations, similar to the one he had introduced in the Nuba Mountains, throughout the areas under the SPLA’s control.

The isolation of the Nuba continued to be one of Kuwa’s main concerns, and he struggled to bring United Nations humanitarian aid to the Nuba people. In 1994 the first plane landed clandestinely in the SPLA controlled part of to the Nuba Mountains. Journalists and human rights activists started to reveal the atrocities committed against the Nuba population. Meanwhile, Kuwa helped form the Nuba Relief, Rehabilitation and Development Organization (NRRDO), a Nuba humanitarian organization. Several international NGOs agreed to support it, but the amount of relief the NRRDO managed to mobilize never matched the enormous needs of the Nuba.

== Death ==
Yousif Kuwa was diagnosed with prostate cancer in 1998 and died on 31 March 2001 while undergoing treatment in Norwich, England. He died before witnessing the signing of a Comprehensive Peace Agreement that finally ended the South Sudan conflict.

Although the SPLM/A was predominantly Christian, Kuwa remained a Muslim all his life. The Yousif Kuwa Teachers Training Institute (YKTTI), which was established in the Nuba Mountains with the support of the Koinonia Community, is named after him.

Yousif Kuwa was survived by his wives Fatuma, Hannan and Ummasar.
