= Andrew Kaggwa =

Ugandan Catholic martyr and saint (1856–1886)

Saint Andrew Kaggwa
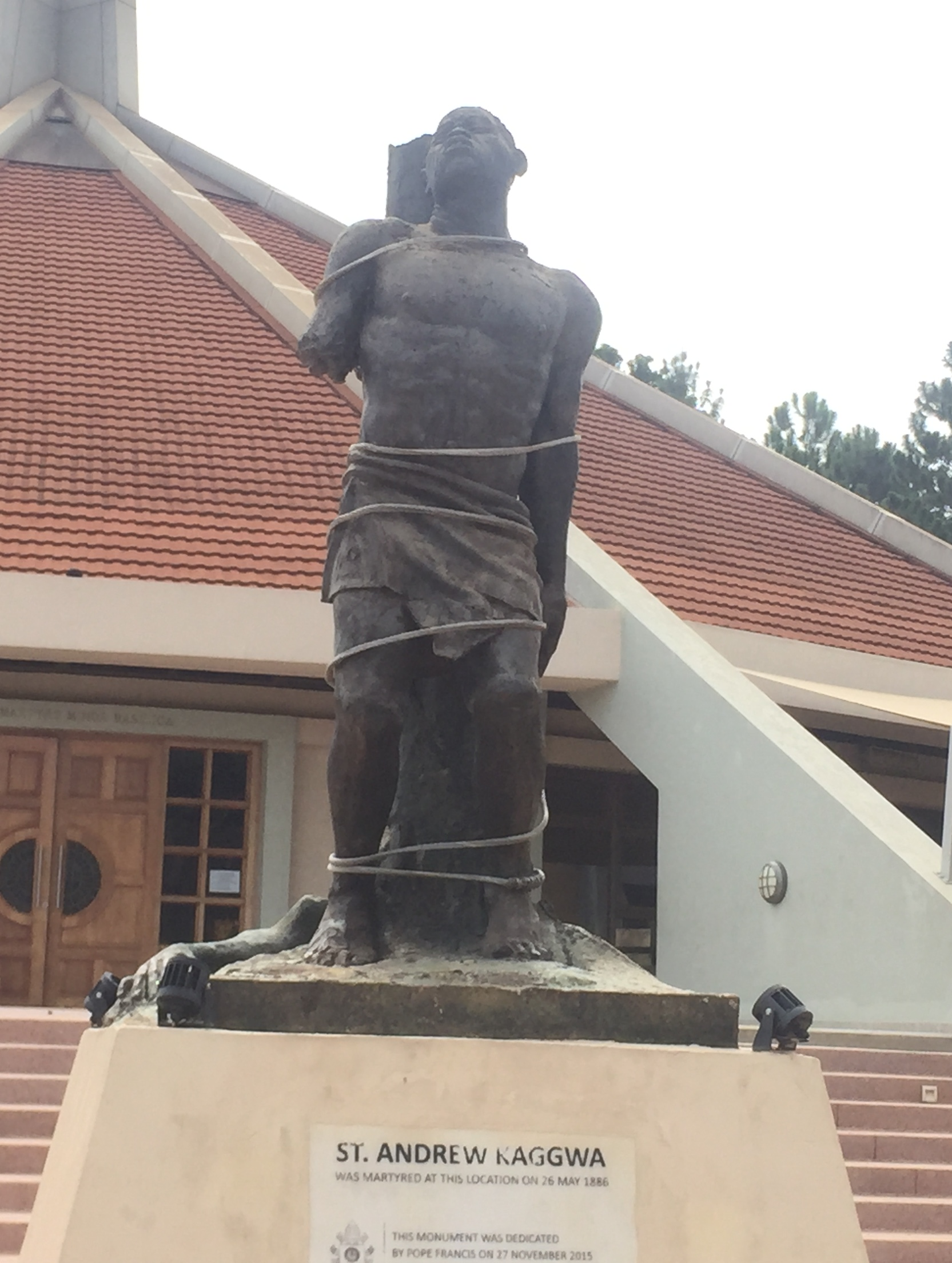
- Monument of Kaggwa

Martyr
- Born: 1856; Kibaale, Uganda
- Died: 26 May 1886 (aged 29–30); Munyonyo, Uganda
- Cause of death: Execution by decapitation
- Venerated in: Catholic Church
- Beatified: 1920 by Pope Benedict XV
- Canonized: 18 October 1964 by Pope Paul VI
- Major shrine: Munyonyo Martyrs Shrine
- Feast: 3 June
- Patronage: Catechists; families; teachers

Andrew Kaggwa (Note: Also Andrea Kaahwa.) (1856 – 26 May 1886) was a Ugandan Catholic martyr killed for his faith. He was one of many Christians put to death by King Mwanga II between 1885 and 1887. He was the king Mwanga's bandmaster-General, the Mugowa.

He was baptized on 30 April 1882 by Père Simon Lourdel M.Afr. (known as Fr. Mapera) at Nabulagala.

The day he died, he was arrested at his home and taken to the Chancellor, who ordered the executioners to cut off his arm. Kaggwa's arm was first cut off and taken to Mukasa before he was beheaded and hacked to pieces at Munyonyo. He died in the afternoon of Wednesday 26 May 1886.

Kaggwa is the patron of catechists, teachers and families. He is remembered as one of the Martyrs of Uganda's feast day.

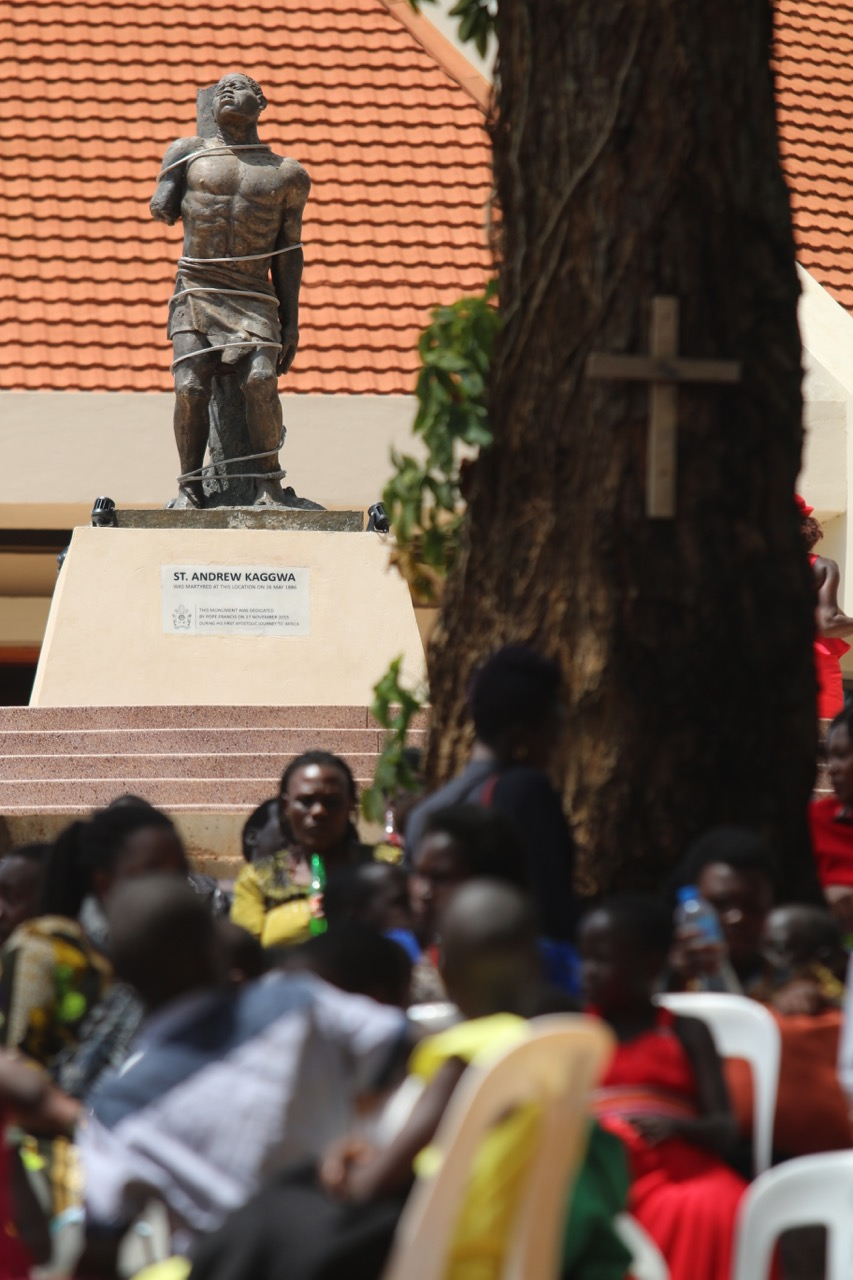
Statue erected at the spot of martyrdom of Andrew Kaggwa at Munyonyo Martyrs Shrine

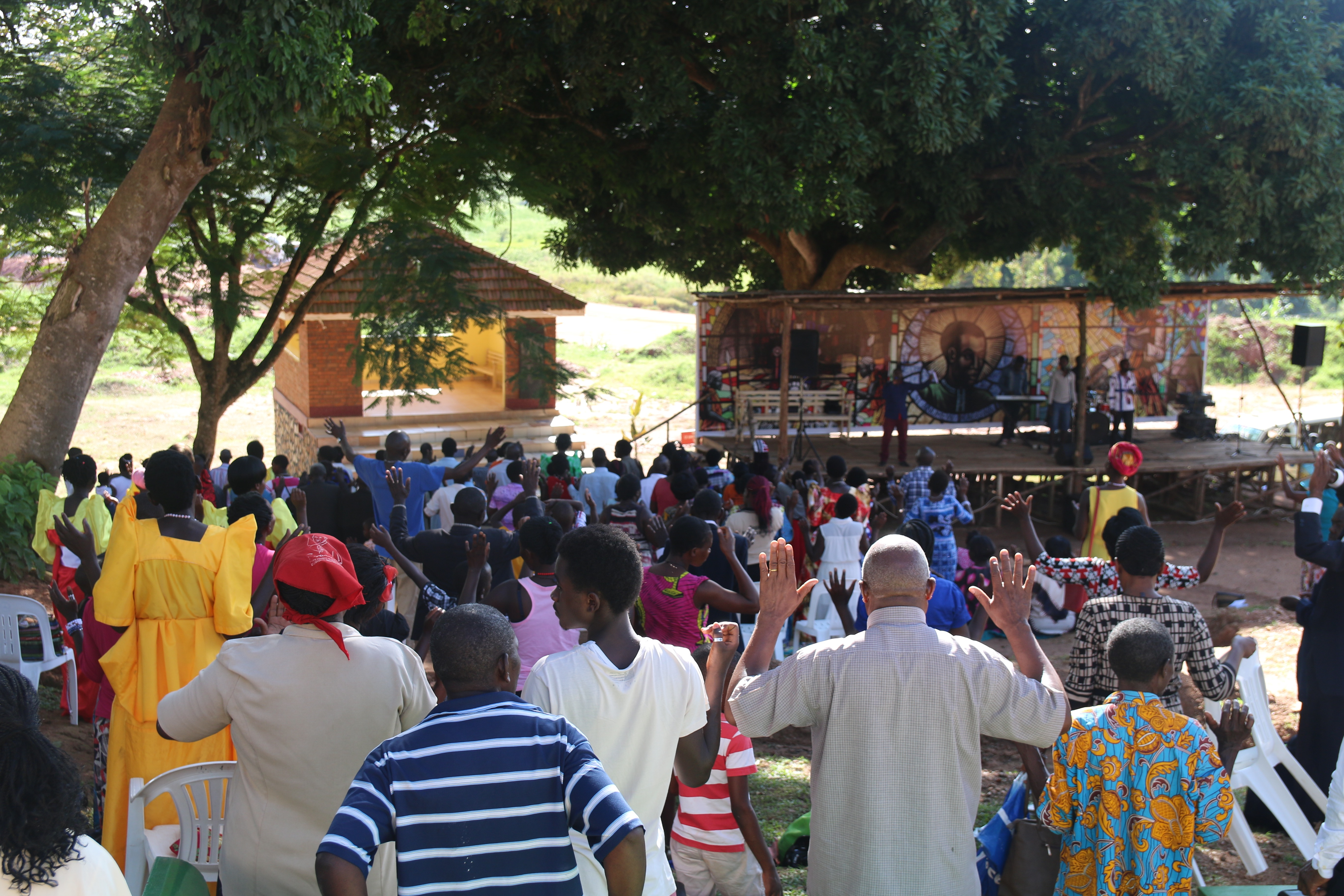
Open amphitheatre built on the tomb of St. Andrew
