= Munyonyo Martyrs' Shrine =

Roman Catholic shrine and Minor Basilica in Munyonyo, Uganda

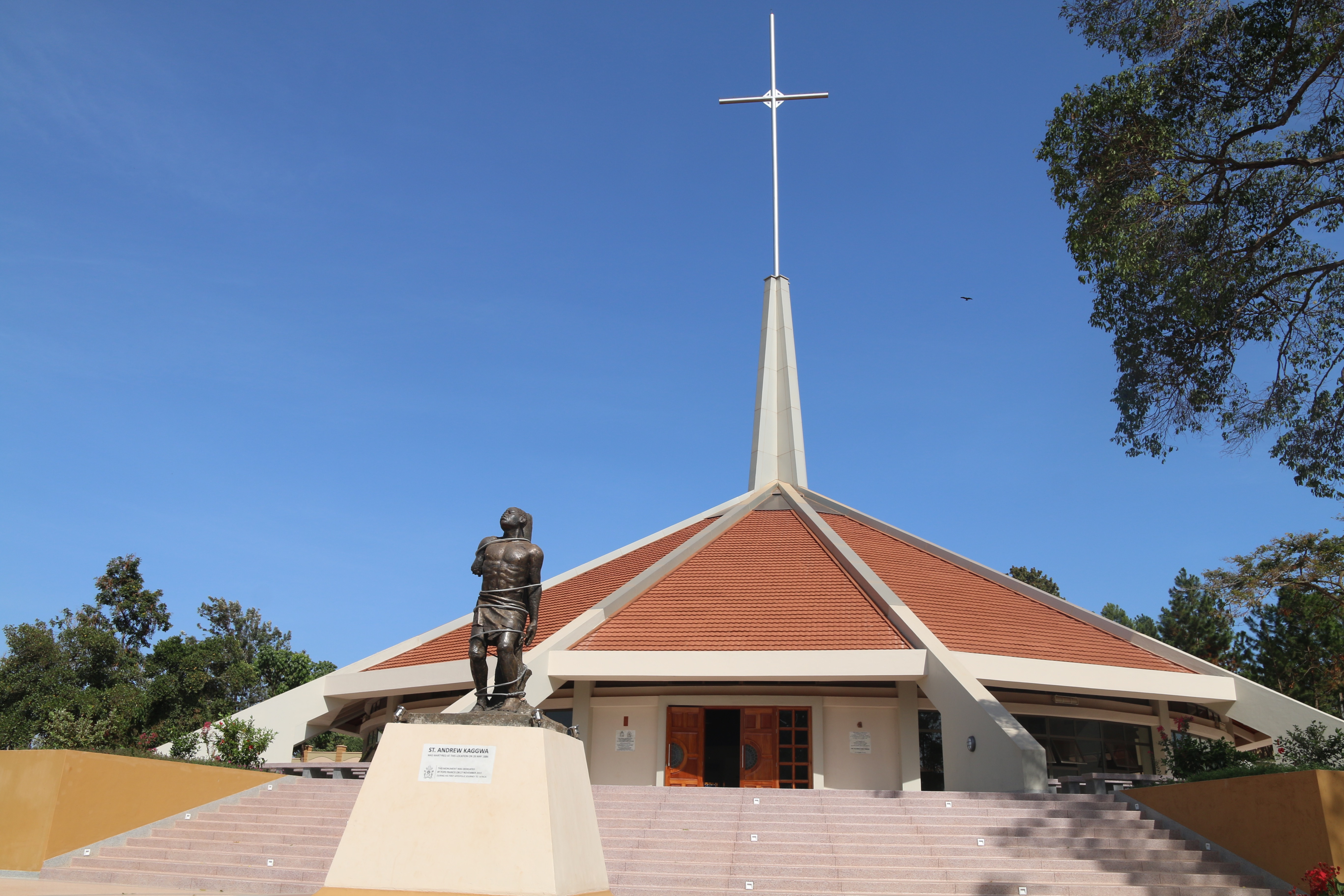
- Basilica and martyrdom spot.

Religion
- Affiliation: Roman Catholic
- Diocese: Archdiocese of Kampala
- Ecclesiastical or organisational status: Minor Basilica, Shrine
- Leadership: Greyfriars
- Year consecrated: 2017

Location
- Location: Munyonyo, Kampala, Uganda
- Interactive map of Munyonyo Martyrs' Shrine

Architecture
- Architect: Robert Sseremba
- Groundbreaking: 2015
- Completed: 2016

Specifications
- Capacity: 1600
- Height (max): 47 m.

Website
- Homepage

The Munyonyo Martyrs’ Shrine is a Roman Catholic shrine and Minor Basilica dedicated to the Ugandan Martyrs.

== Location ==
The church is located at Munyonyo, Kampala, in Central Uganda. Munyonyo is located approximately 13 kilometres (8.1 mi), by road, south of the central business district of Kampala, Uganda's capital and largest city.

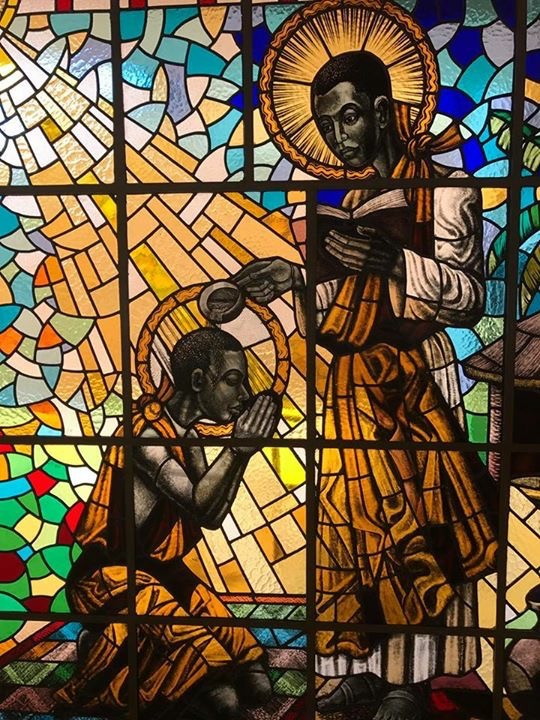
St. Kizito being baptised by St. Charles Lwanga at Munyonyo.

== Overview ==
Munyonyo Martyrs' Shrine is the martyrdom place of leaders in Royal enclave; St. Andrew Kaggwa and St. Denis Ssebugwawo - Uganda Martyrs killed by King Mwanga II on 26 May 1886 canonized by Pope Paul VI in 1964. It is also a place where in 1886 Saint Charles Lwanga - leader of Christian community in Uganda baptized St. Kizito, St. Mbaga, St. Gyavira and St. Muggaga.

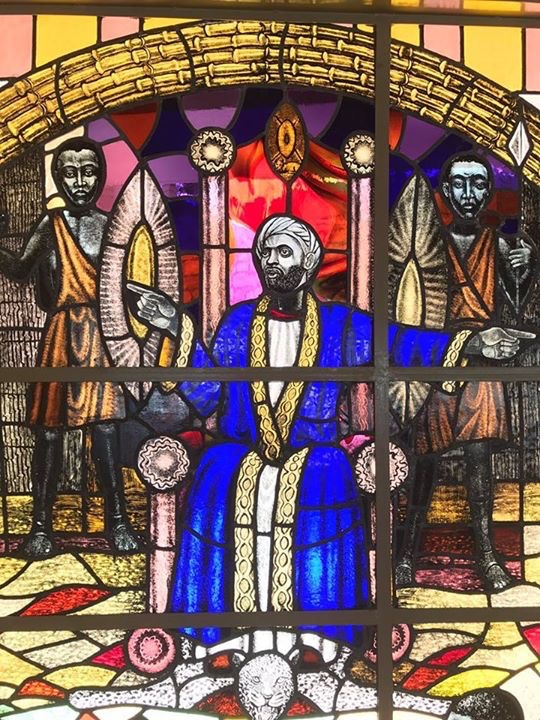
King Mwanga on stained glass at Munyonyo

== History ==
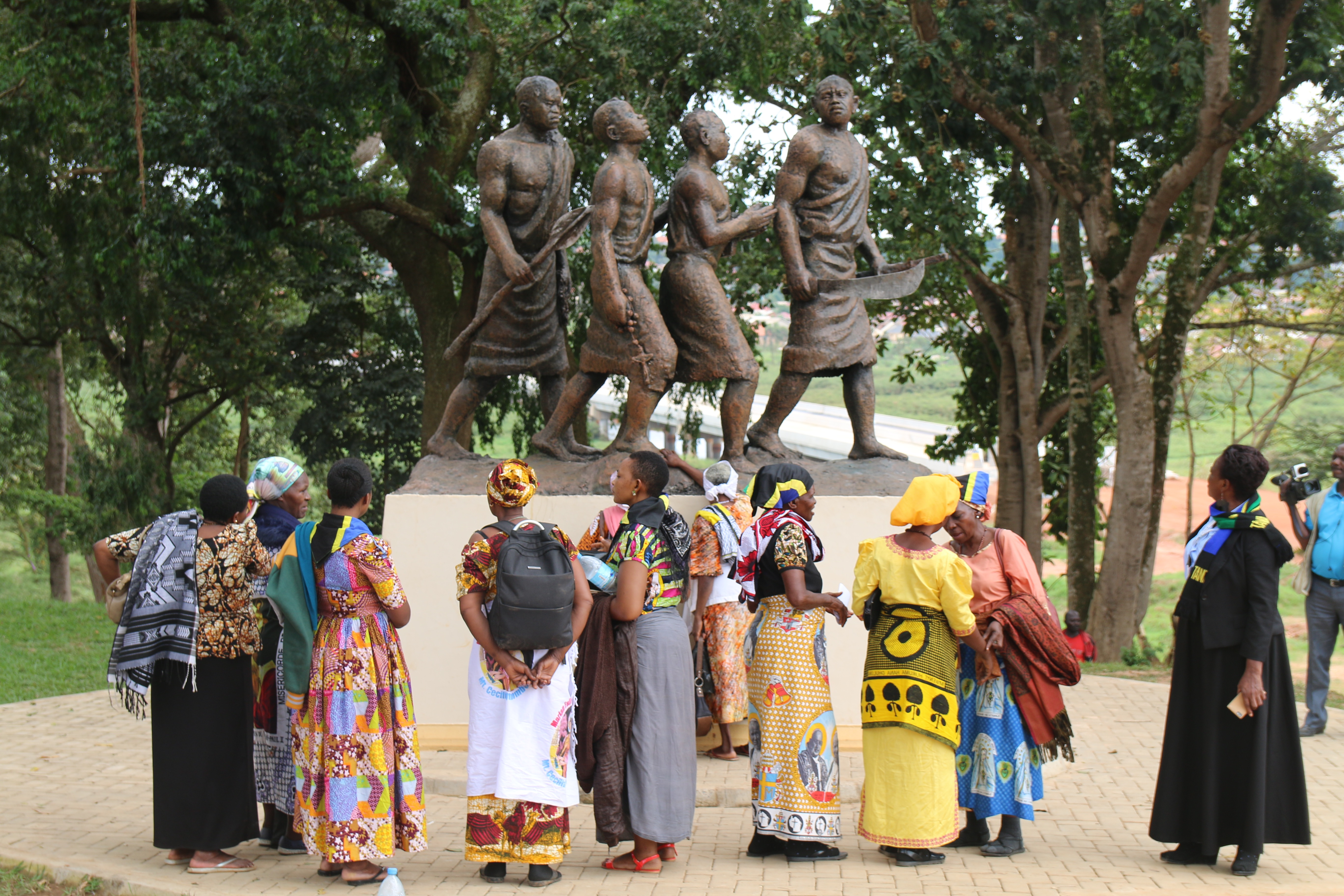
Monument at Munyonyo marking the spot from where future martyrs walked for death

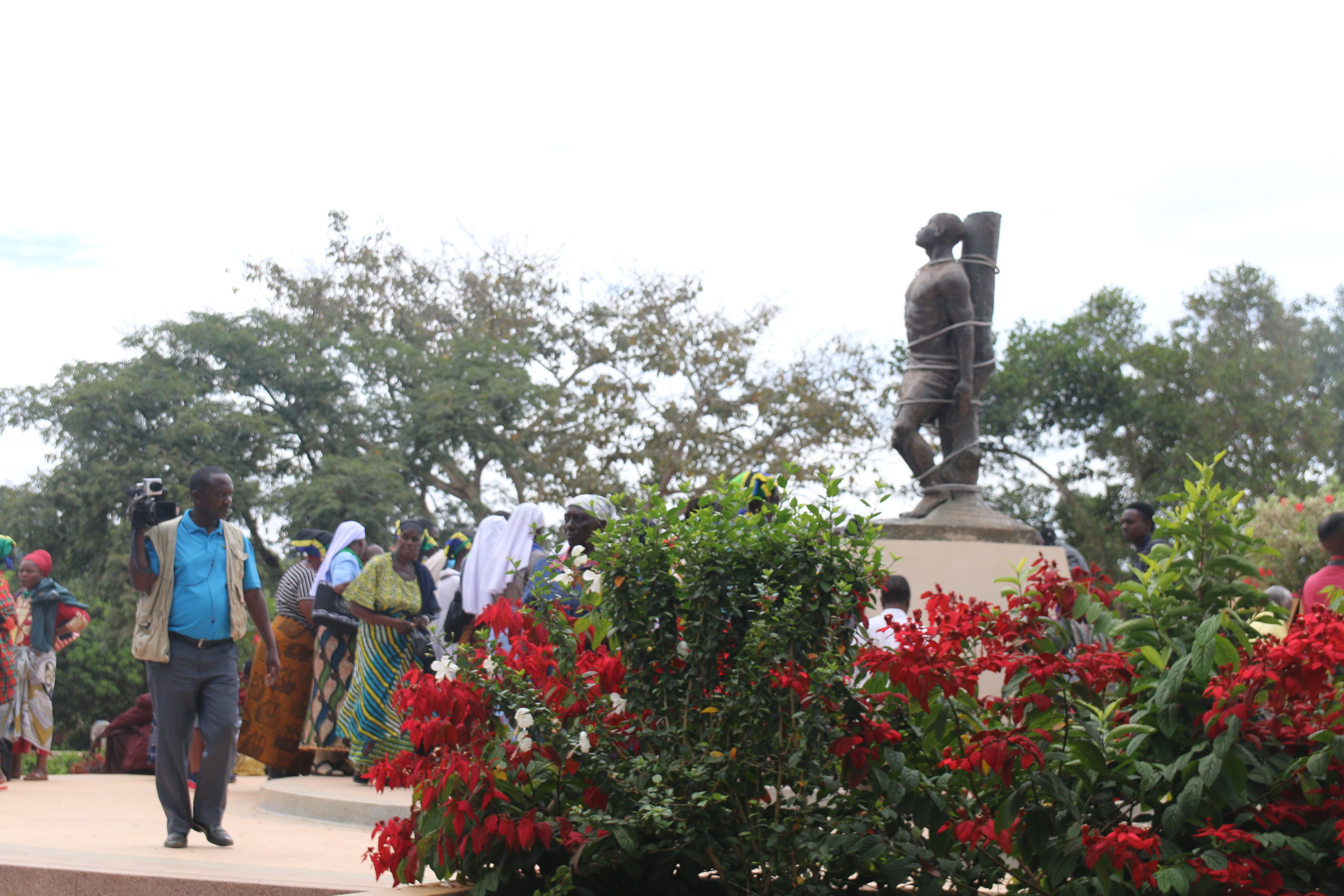
Martyrdom of Andrew Kaggwa

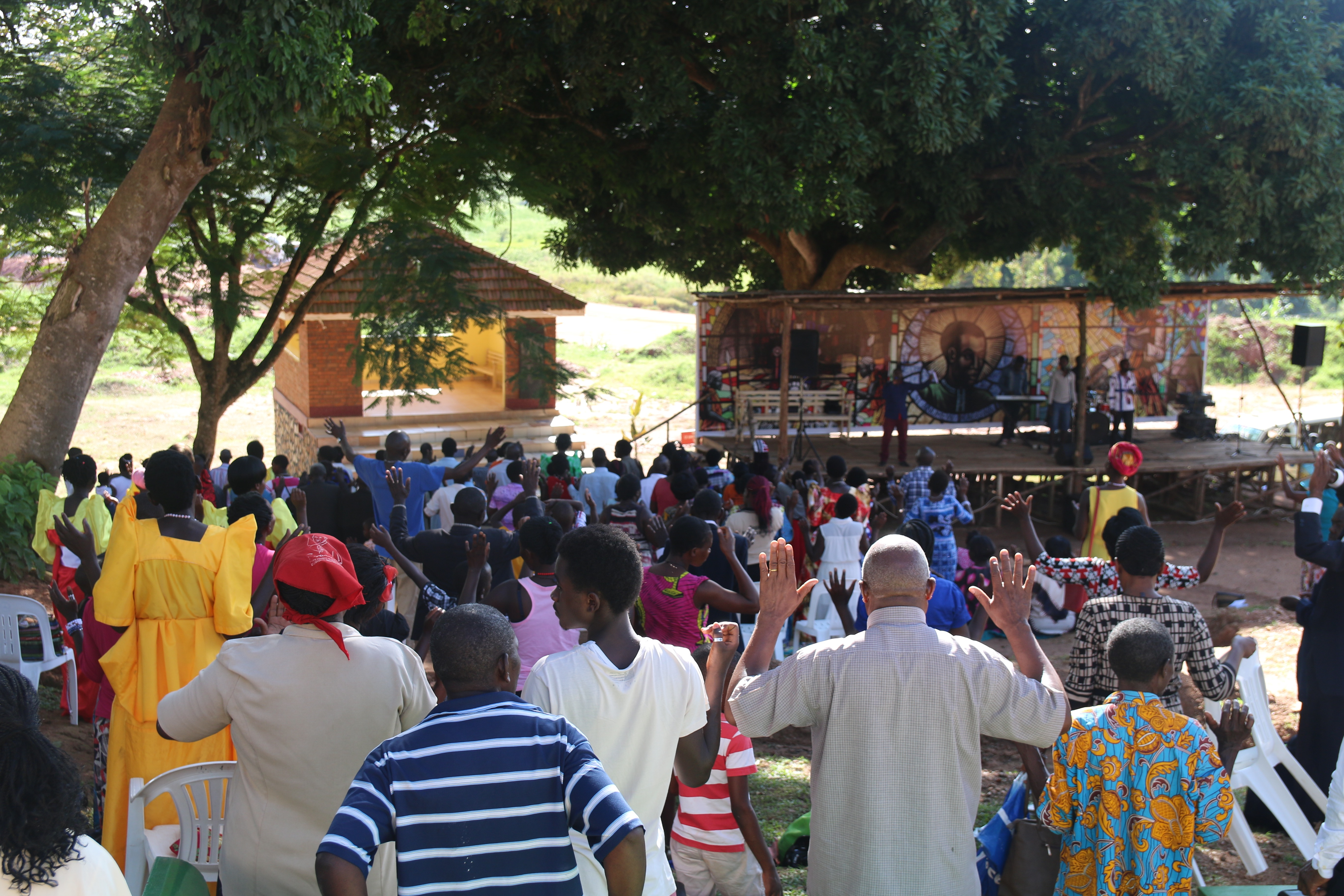
Open amphitheatre built on the tomb of the martyr

It was at Munyonyo where King Mwanga took the fateful decision to begin putting Christians to death. The blood of Ugandan's martyrs was shed on the soil around Munyonyo. The first three Christians to render their lives for Christ's sake after the King's decision did so on 26 May 1886 – they were: St. Denis Ssebugwawo, St. Andrew Kaggwa and St. Pontiano Ngondwe.

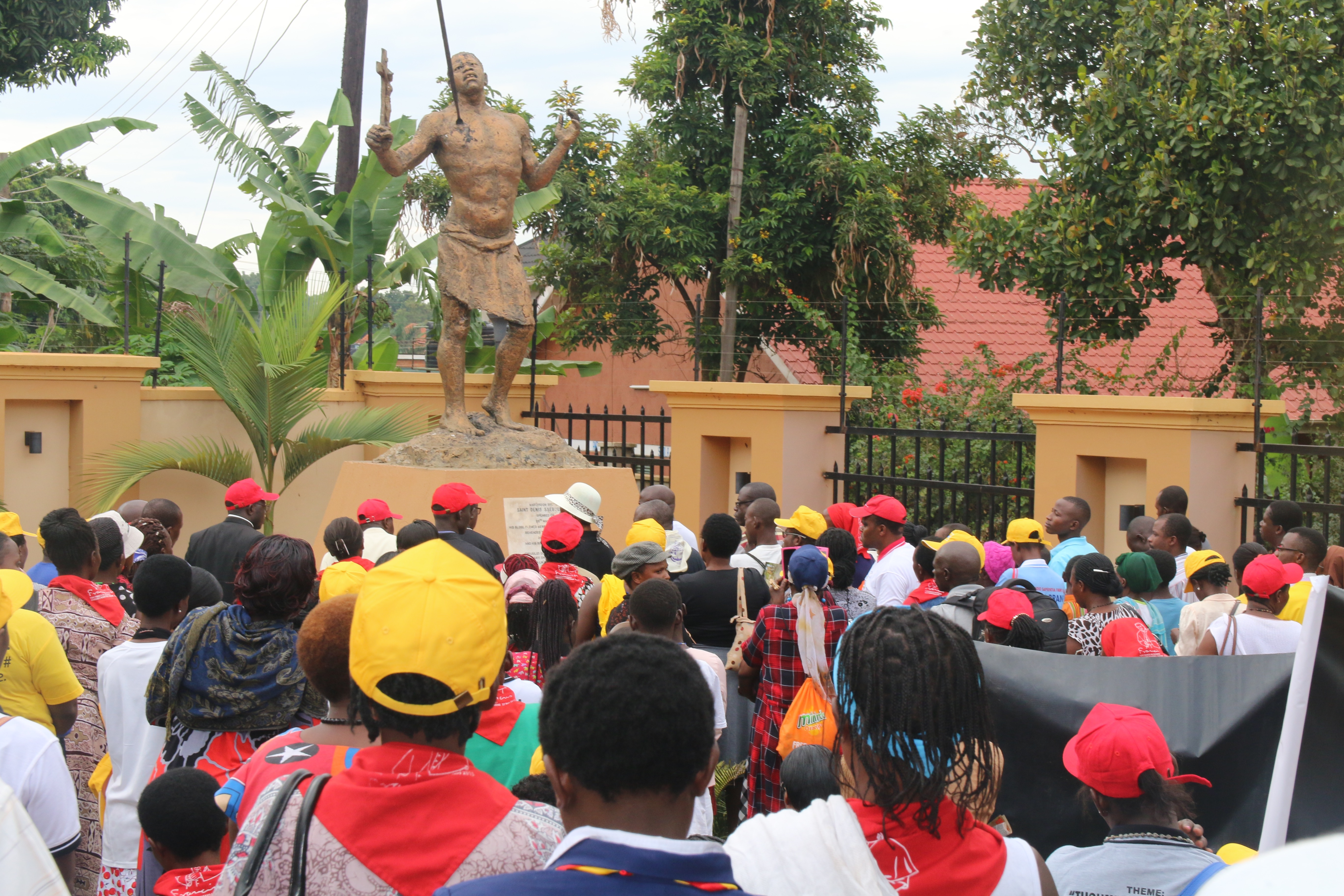
Place where St. Danis was speared

In Munyonyo, all of the King's Christian pageboys were captured and sentenced to death at Namugongo (the Kingdom's designated place for execution). The prisoners were grievously bound to each other, and were made to walk their life's final journey escorted by merciless soldiers; theirs was a brutal and soul-inspiring last pilgrimage. On the way to Namugongo, at a lonely spot by the side of a road in Kyamula, Pontiano was martyred – he was the third Ugandan whose love of Christ outshone his desire for life itself. That same day in Munyonyo, servant of God, Fr. Symeon Lourdel (Mapeera) was desperately seeking an audience with the King Mwanga in order to intervene for condemned Christians. However, he was not permitted to see King.

Having intuited the grave and imminent danger which was about to befall Uganda's Christian community, as night fell on 25 May 1886, Charles Lwanga (the leader of Uganda's Christian community) secretly baptised four catechumens at Munyonyo: St. Kizito, St. Mbaga, St. Gyavira and St. Muggaga The very morning, King Mwanga brought his whole court before him and separated the Christians from the rest saying, "those who do not pray stand by me, those who do pray stand over there". He proceeded to ask the fifteen boys and young men standing apart whether they were Christian and, if they were, whether they intended to remain so. When they answered "Yes" with strength and courage, Mwanga condemned them all to death. After a short imprisonment, the future martyrs subsequently walked, staggered and were often dragged over a number of days until they finally reached the martyrdom site in Namugongo (3 June 1886).

== Shrine re-development ==
In 2014, Uganda celebrated 50 years since the Uganda Martyrs were canonized and elevated to Sainthood by Pope Paul VI on 18 October 1964. Uganda Martyrs Shrine in Munyonyo is a thanksgiving monument for their canonization. Official groundbreaking was on 3 May 2015 by Papal Nuncio to Uganda; Archbishop Michael A. Blume and Cardinal Emmanuel Wamala. Redevelopment includes construction of new church shrine, museum, offices and martyrdom spots of the saints.

Since October 2013, the shrine has been administered by a Franciscan religious order of Greyfriars - Conventual Franciscans.

Pope Francis visited and blessed the cornerstone of the Shrine on 27 November 2015 during his journey to Africa. The construction of the new church was completed in 2016 and the shrine was consecrated on 28 October 2017 by Cardinal Fernando Filoni.

On 19 July 2019, The Holy See granted the church the title and dignity of a Minor Basilica. The decree was signed by Cardinal Robert Sarah, Prefect of the Congregation for Divine Worship and the Discipline of the Sacraments on behalf of Pope Francis.

On 3 June 2025, two Ugandan rebels were killed when a female suicide bomber detonated her explosives near the church during a celebration of Martyr's Day. The two rebels were the only individuals killed.

== See also ==
- Uganda Martyrs
- Namugongo
- Lubaga
- Roman Catholicism in Uganda
- Roman Catholic Archdiocese of Kampala
