= Najwa Musa Konda =

Sudanese activist (born 1976)

- Born: 1976 (age 49–50); Kambara
- Citizenship: Sudan
- Education: Ahfad University for Women; Swansea University
- Occupation: Activist
- Employer: UNICEF
- Organization: Nuba women's association.
- Known for: Women-led self-protection in Sudan
- Notable work: Nuba Relief, Rehabilitation and Development Organisation
- Father: Musa Konda Kuka

Najwa Musa Konda (alternative spellings: Nagwa, Mousa, Kinda, Kunda) (born 1976) is a Sudanese women's rights activist and civil society leader for the Two Areas (South Kordofan and Blue Nile).

== Life ==
Najwa Musa Konda was born in 1976 in the village of Kambara, near the small town of Kauda. Her father, Musa Konda Kuka, had taken literacy classes late in life, and ensured all his nine children attended school. Despite experiencing some prejudice against both her dark skin and her Christianity, Najwa Musa Konda won a scholarship to Ahfad University for Women in Omdurman. After graduation she studied for a Master's degree at Swansea University in Wales.

Najwa Musa's education enabled her to get jobs in the humanitarian sector. In 2005, she was a representative of the Nuba women's association. In 2006, as a UNICEF representative, she was helping to provide schooling at the camp for displaced people near Kauda in South Kordofan.

She started working for the Nuba Relief, Rehabilitation and Development Organisation (NRRDO), and eventually became executive director. As head of NRRDO, Najwa Musa presciently warned in May 2011 that the Nuba Mountains might be brought into the conflict and become "a new Darfur. In May 2012, she was among 150 signatories of a joint letter by civil society leaders imploring US and China to help solve Sudan/South Sudan conflict. In February 2014, the SPLM-N named her as one of seven national experts to join their delegation to peace talks with the government. In September 2014 she warned of the humanitarian situation in South Kordofan.

In 2016, Malik Agar appointed her to a committee charged with implementing a UN action plan to end SPLM-N's recruitment of child soldiers. Speaking on International Women's Day in March 2017, Musa highlighted the high rate of maternal mortality, domestic violence against women, child marriage and female genital mutilation in the Two Areas. On March 31 or April 1 2026 Nagwa Musa Konda was taken prisoner by SPLA-N forces and was refused access to lawyer, visitation and kept in a cell without light or ventillation.

== Works ==
- (with Leila Karim, Tima Kodi and Nils Castensen) 'Women-led self-protection in Sudan', Forced Migration Review, October 2016.
