= Jimmy Lwanga =

Ugandan politician

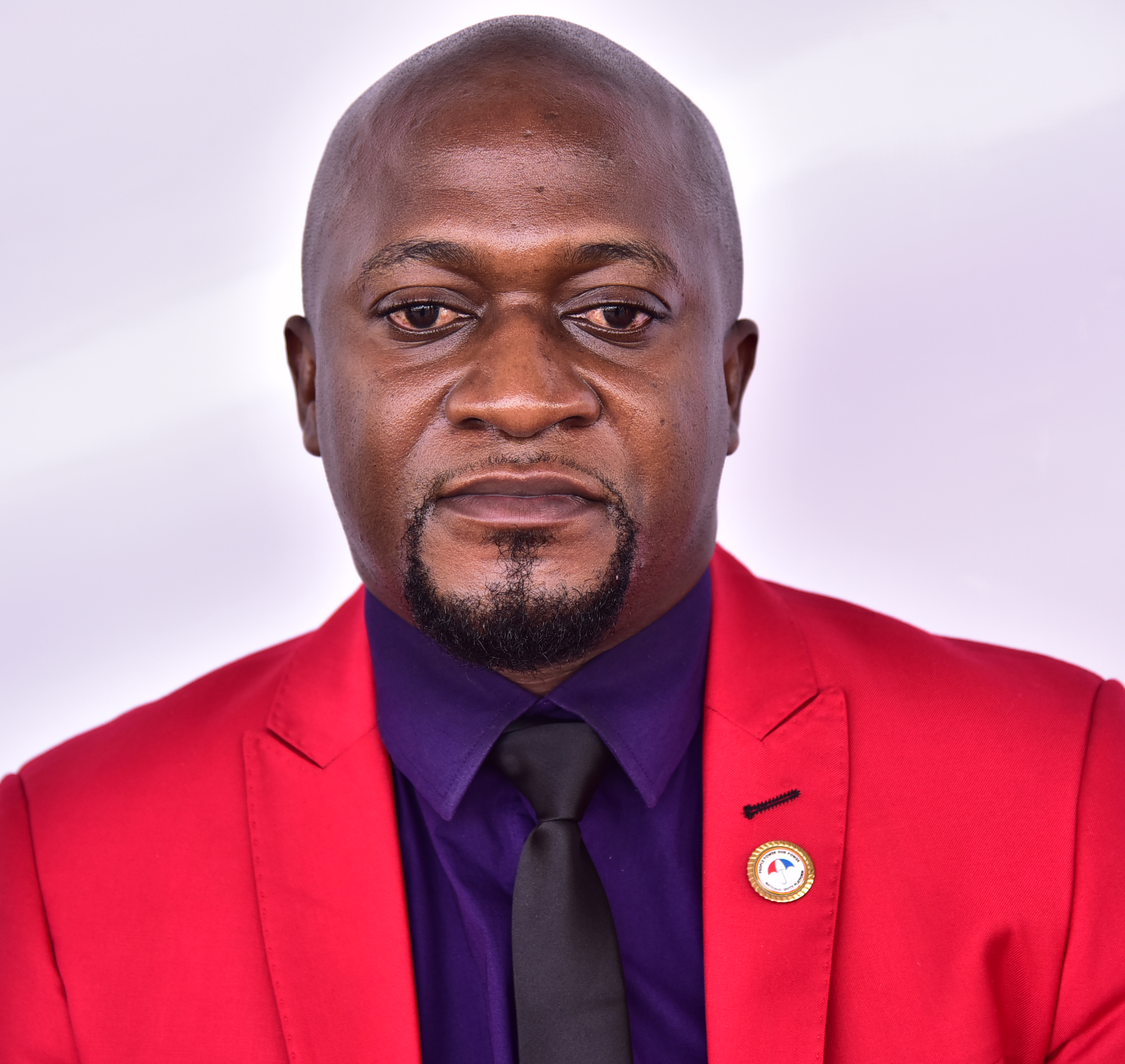

Member of Parliament
- Incumbent
- Assumed office 2021
- Constituency: Njeru Municipality

Personal details
- Born: Buikwe District, Uganda
- Party: Patriotic League of Uganda (2023–present)
- Other political affiliations: National Unity Platform (until 2023)
- Occupation: Politician
- Committees: Public Service and Local Government Committee

Jimmy Lwanga is a Ugandan politician and member of parliament. He was elected in office as a member of the parliament for Njeru Municipality in Buikwe District during the 2021 Uganda general elections.

He was a member of the National Unity Platform political party but opted to join the Patriotic League of Uganda, a political party led by Muhozi Kainerugaba in 2023.

Lwanga serves on the Public Service and Local Government Committee of the eleventh parliament.

== See also ==
- List of members of the eleventh Parliament of Uganda
- National Unity Platform
- Wakiso District
- Member of Parliament
- Parliament of Uganda.
