= St. Kizito massacre =

1991 boarding school massacre in Kenya

- Location: 0.3599°N 37.58°E; Meru County, Kenya
- Date: 13 July 1991
- Attack type: murder, gang rape
- Deaths: 19
- Injuries: 71 girls raped
- Victim: Girl students
- Perpetrator: Boy students

The St. Kizito massacre was a high-profile rape and massacre of girls on 13 July 1991 at the coeducational boarding secondary school St. Kizito in Meru County, Kenya, named after Saint Kizito. 71 girls were raped and 19 killed by their male classmates. The school closed as a result.

== Background ==
The school was established as an all-boys school in 1968 and began admitting girls in 1975.

By 1991 the school had 577 students between the ages of 14 and 18 – 306 boys and 271 girls.

== Mass rapes and murders ==
=== Events ===
On 13 July 1991, 71 girls were raped and 19 killed at St. Kizito school. After supposedly declining to participate in a strike organized by the boys at the school, the girls' dormitory was invaded by male students and the chaos began.

=== Response ===
Initial reports included a statement from the deputy principal, Joyce Kithira, who said, "The boys never meant any harm against the girls. They just wanted to rape." Kithira was dismissed from her position for her "failure to maintain discipline" at the school but was almost immediately reinstated. School principal James Laiboni commented that rape was a common occurrence at the school. The view was echoed by Francis Machira Apollos, a local probation officer.

The school was closed immediately after the massacre as international outrage erupted on the treatment of women in Kenya and other African nations. 39 boys were arrested in connection with the incident.

== See also ==
- Education in Kenya
- List of schools in Kenya
- List of attacks related to secondary schools
