= Koinonia Community =

Humanitarian organization in Africa

Koinonia is a lay Christian community with social and humanitarian projects in Kenya, Zambia and the Nuba Mountains of Sudan.

== Origin and Community ==
The Koinonia Community was initially founded in 1988 by Father Renato Kizito Sesana, a Comboni Priest, and a group of young men from different professions and backgrounds. Members of the community live as one family, sharing dreams, successes and failures, with their inspiration being the life of the early biblical Christians as recorded in the Acts of the Apostles. Today, the community has about thirty members, all of whom are financially independent.

Koinonia Community members are committed to the growth of the local society within which Koinonia is based. In line with their calling, the members strive to counteract the economic and social evils bred by individualism and abject poverty.

The members try, in their daily lives, to integrate African tradition and Gospel values into a commitment to belong to the modern world. To achieve this aspiration, the Community gives special attention to modern means of social communication and their role in fostering a sense of unity and belonging within the society.

== Activities and Social Enterprises ==
Since its registration as a corporate body in 1996, Koinonia Kenya has undertaken a host of activities and social enterprises in the societies within which the community is based. The activities and projects give priority to the marginalized members of the society, such as children in difficult circumstances – especially street children – as well as women and young people from poor backgrounds.

The community runs the following activities and projects:

Kivuli Centre, a rehabilitation center for children rescued from the streets. The centre houses 60 boys and provides a variety of activities for the resident children as well as the youth of the surrounding area. Located along Kabiria Road, in Nairobi’s Dagoretti Division, the centre has a dispensary, a computer school, micro credit programmes and a number of income generating initiatives.

Anita’s Home, a rehabilitation and formation home for former female street children. The home is situated at Ngong Town, 20 kilometers south of Nairobi, and holds 60 girls.

Ndugu Mdogo, a rehabilitation home that offers a hospitable environment for vulnerable children from the streets of the expansive Kibera slum. The home is located at Kerarapon, between Nairobi’s affluent Karen suburb and Ngong town. It has 30 resident children, whom it provides with basic needs, medical services and a family lifestyle.

Ndugu Mdogo Drop-In Centre, an initiative at the expansive Kibera slum, where Koinonia social workers initiate the rehabilitation process through activities targeting children living on the streets. The Drop-In centre also provides shelter for children in emergency situations such as sickness, abuse by adults or any other immediate danger.

Tone la Maji, a children’s rehabilitation centre with a special focus on pedagogical activities and research. Located at Ongata Rongai in the Rift Valley Province of Kenya, the centre is a partnership with La Goccia, an Italian association based in Senago – Milano, Italy. It holds 60 resident children.

Domus Mariae, a modern secondary school that affords academically outstanding children from unfortunate backgrounds access to quality education, in line with the Millennium Development Goals.

Paolo’s Home, A rehabilitation centre that provides physiotherapy services to physically disabled children in Nairobi's Kibera slum. It is named after Paolo, a talented, courageous, physically handicapped Italian man who died in 2005.

Koinonia House (also called The Mother House), a premises in Riruta Satellite, Nairobi, which hosts Koinonia Community members and students from the Nuba Mountains of Central Sudan, who have scholarships to study in Nairobi. The house also hosts several Koinonia initiatives, including Kivuli Ndogo, a programme which allows street boys from the surrounding areas to visits on Saturdays and Wednesday to wash, attend informal classes, and share a meal.

== Affiliated Initiatives ==
Various Koinonia Kenya initiatives have grown to obtain an identity of their own. These include the following;

NAREC (Nairobi Recyclers), a community based environmental conservation initiative which engages street children in the collection, recycling and reselling of plastic and glass waste. NAREC currently generates income for about 25 street boys.

White Gazelle tours, a non-profit travel agent that specializes in social tourism and reinvests its earnings in other Koinonia Community projects.

Shalom House, a building complex with accommodation, dining and workshop facilities. Shalom house also houses a documentation centre on peace and reconciliation in Africa, as well as the offices of various organizations and associations. Located on St. Daniel Comboni road, off Ngong Road in Nairobi, Shalom House also serves as the Koinonia Kenya Headquarters.

Koinonia Advisory Research and Development Services (KARDS), a Community Development consultancy with special focus on organizational capacity building and training of community based staff. KARDS undertakes projects in Eastern and Central Africa, the Great Lakes Region and the Horn of Africa.

Shalom IT Centre, an Information Technology training institute that aims to provide professional standards to talented youth, who are then empowered to contribute their skills towards the economic, social and human growth of Kenya.

NewsFromAfrica.org, an electronic news bulletin that publishes news, features, press reviews and editorials. All published material is written from the perspective of the African grassroots people in their struggle for freedom, dignity and justice.

Africa Peace Link, a non profit coalition of volunteer persons and corporate bodies that offer their skills to help integrate Information and Communication Technology development into the growth of the African people. Africa PeaceLink lays its underlying emphasis on the promotion of peace, justice, human rights, environment awareness and freedom of expression in Africa. All volunteers offer their services absolutely free of charge.

Nafsi Afrika Acrobats, a registered community-based organization that sources and nurtures artistic talent.

== Koinonia in Africa ==
The Koinonia Community has spread to the Nuba Mountains of Sudan, where a sister community, Koinonia Nuba, runs two primary schools and the Yousif Kuwa Teachers Training Institute (YKTTI), which is named after Yousif Kuwa, a legendary commander in the Sudan People's Liberation Army and longtime leader of the Nuba people.

Another sister community is in Zambia (Koinonia Zambia). It runs a children’s home and a large farm in the outskirts of the capital, Lusaka.

== Trivia ==
The term “Koinonia” is an ancient Greek word that roughly means “deep fellowship.” It is used often in the New Testament of the Bible to denote the broad concept of communion through intimate participation, as exhibited by the relationship between the apostles in the early Christian church.

== See also ==
Koinonia
