= Joseph Kizito =

Joseph Kizito may refer to:

- Joseph Kizito (footballer), Ugandan footballer
- Joseph Kizito (priest), Ugandan-born Roman Catholic priest and bishop in South Africa
