= Denis Ssebuggwawo Wasswa =

Ugandan Roman Catholic martyr

Saint Denis Sebugwawo
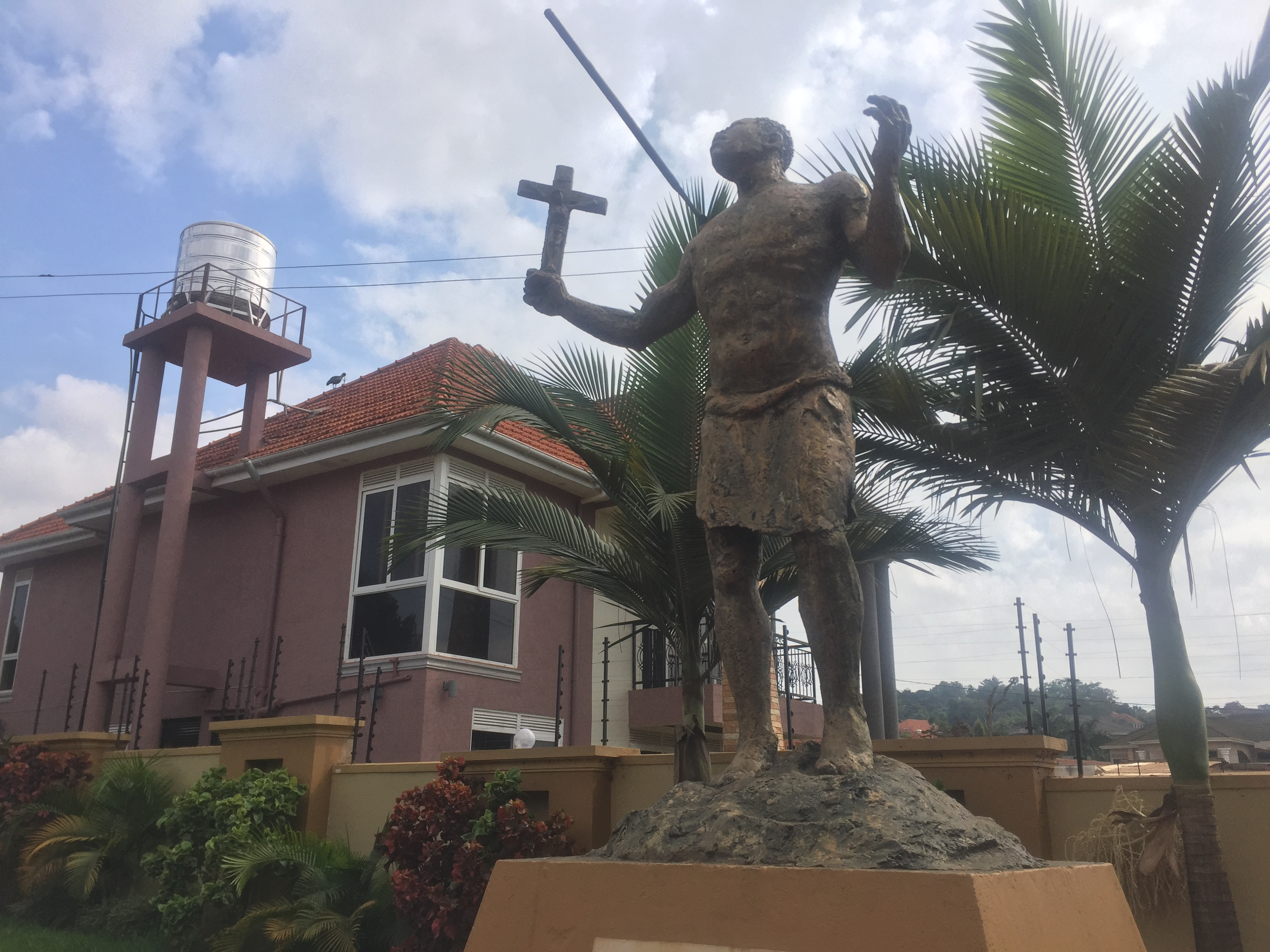
- Place of Martydom

Martyr
- Born: Wasswa Ssebuggwawo; 1870; Kigoloba, Bulemeezi, Uganda
- Died: May 25, 1886 (aged 15–16); Munyonyo, Uganda
- Venerated in: Catholic Church
- Beatified: 6 June 1920 by Pope Benedict XV
- Canonized: 18 October 1964 by Pope Paul VI
- Major shrine: Munyonyo Martyrs Shrine
- Feast: 3 June
- Patronage: Musicians

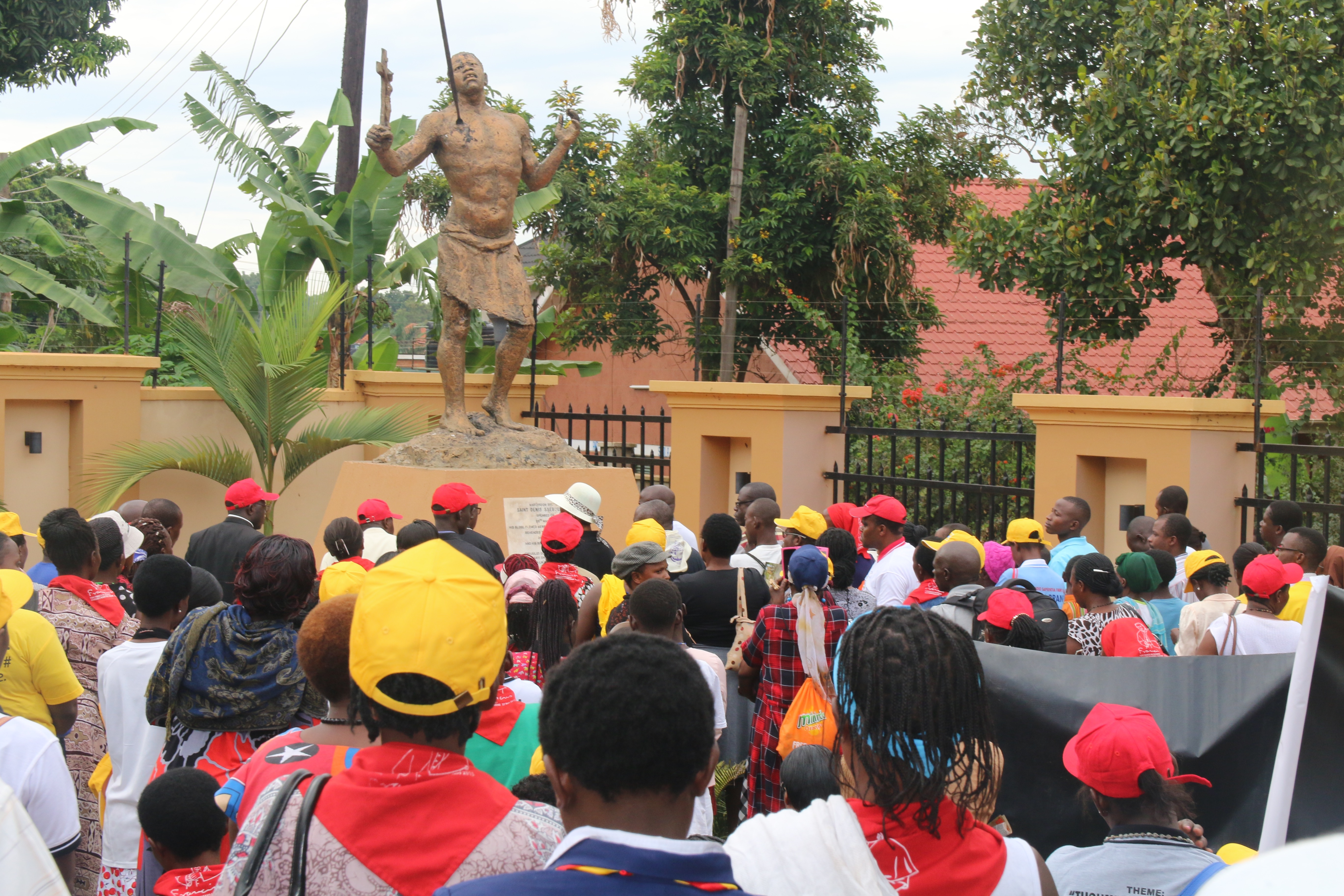
Munyonyo Martyrs Shrine

Denis Ssebuggwawo (1870-25 May 1886) is a Ugandan Catholic martyr and saint. He was born at Kigoloba in Bulemeezi County. His father was Kajansi and mother was Nsonga of Musoga. Shortly after his birth, his grandfather was put to death and his father moved his family to their family estate at Bunono in Busiro County. Ssebuggwawo belonged to the Musu Clan.

Ssebuggwawo and his twin brother Kato became catechumens and were instructed by Saint Joseph Mukasa Balikuddembe. He was baptized on 16 November 1885 by Père Simon Lourdel, M.Afr., also known as Fr. Mapera, and he took the name Denis as his Christian name.

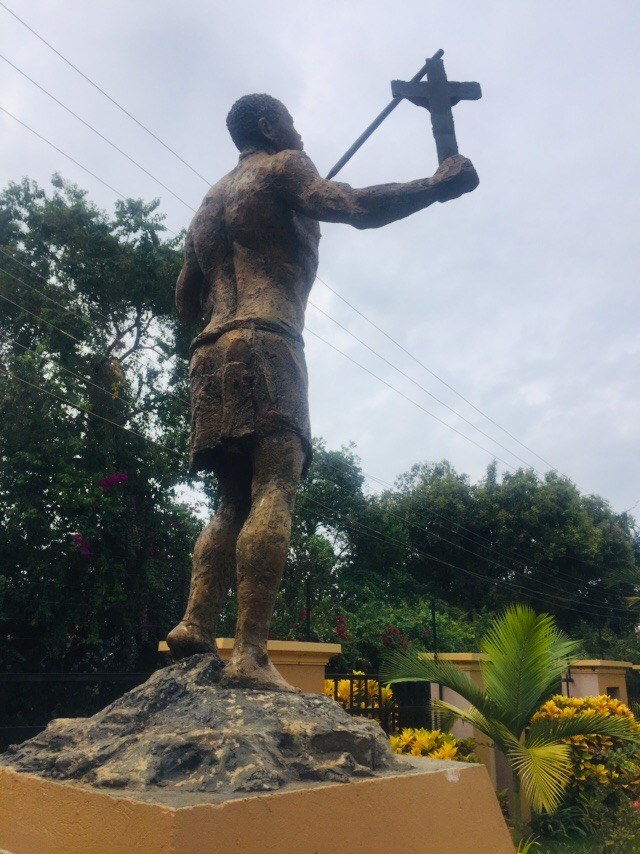
Denis Ssebugwawo Monument with the symbol of his faith and the instrument of his martydom

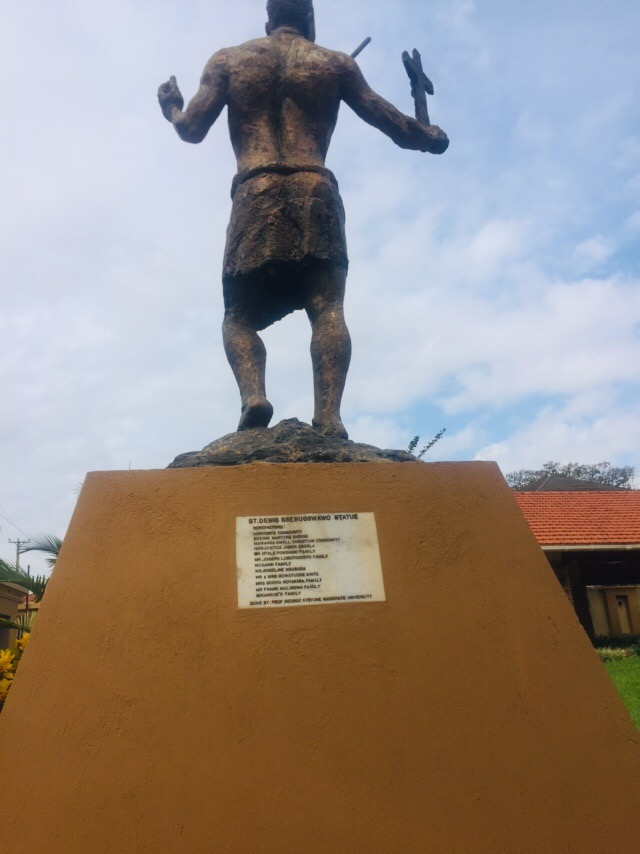
Plaque designated the donors and other responsible parties

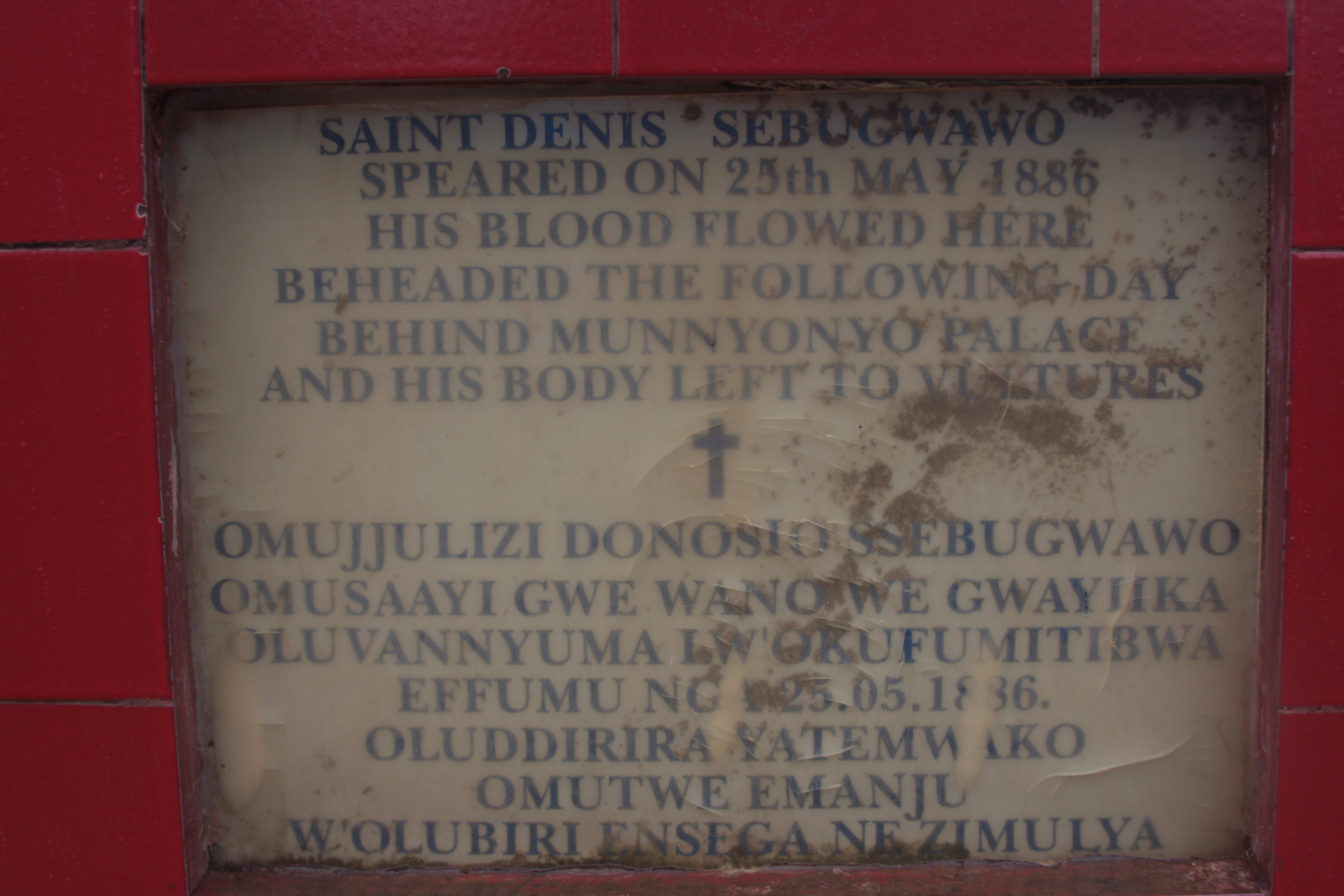
Denis Sebugwawo place of martydom

He was a page of Kabaka Muteesa I of Buganda and a page in personal attendance of Kabaka Mwanga II of Buganda. He was tortured and speared by King Mwanga II, for teaching his faith to Mwafu, the chancellor's son, before handing him over to executioner Mpinga Kaloke on the evening of 25 May 1886. On the morning of 26 May 1886, Mpinga ordered his two men, Matembe and Mulyowa, to hack the body of the boy into pieces. Ssebuggwawo was first beheaded before he was hacked into pieces at Munyonyo. He is remembered as the first of the Martyrs of Uganda.
