= Saint Kizito =

Roman Catholic martyr from Uganda

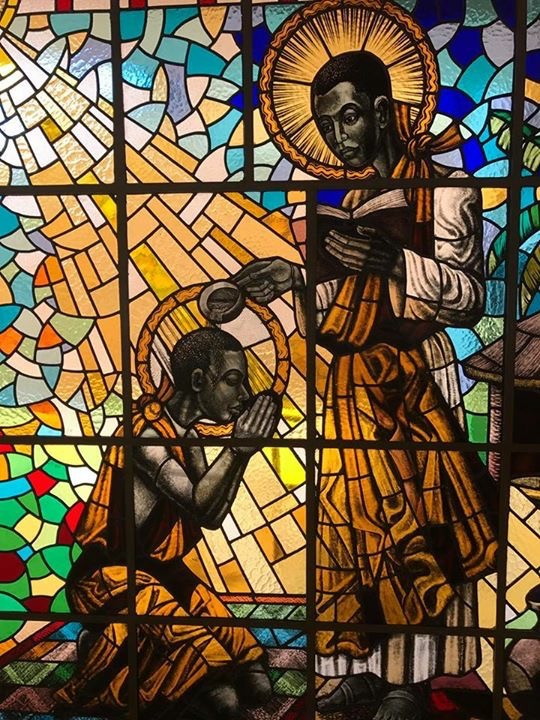
- St. Kizito being baptised by St. Charles Lwanga at Munyonyo – Stained glass at Munyonyo Martyrs Shrine

Martyr
- Born: 1872; Buganda, Uganda
- Died: June 3, 1886 (aged 13–14); Namugongo, Uganda
- Venerated in: Catholic Church
- Beatified: 1920 by Pope Benedict XV
- Canonized: October 18, 1964 by Pope Paul VI
- Major shrine: Basilica Church of the Uganda Martyrs, Namugongo, Munyonyo Martyrs Shrine
- Feast: June 3
- Patronage: children; primary schools

Saint Kizito (1872 – June 3, 1886), who was also known as Kizito Omuto, was one of

the Martyrs of Uganda and the youngest martyr executed by the King Mwanga II of Buganda. He was baptized on May 25/26, 1886, by Charles Lwanga, the leader of Uganda's Christian community at the time, at Munyonyo, and was burned alive on June 3, 1886, in Namugongo. He was canonized on October 18, 1964, by Pope Paul VI in Rome. His feast day is on June 3. He is regarded as the patron saint of children and primary schools.

== See also ==
- St. Kizito, a mixed secondary school in Kenya
- St Kizito Catholic School in Botswana
- Friends of St. Kiizito Rubuguri Primary School in Uganda
