= Yida, South Sudan =

Yida
- Interactive map of Yida
- Coordinates: 10.10448977437887°N 30.09041418028792°E
- Country: South Sudan
- State: Ruweng Administrative Area

Population (2012)
  - Total: 50,000

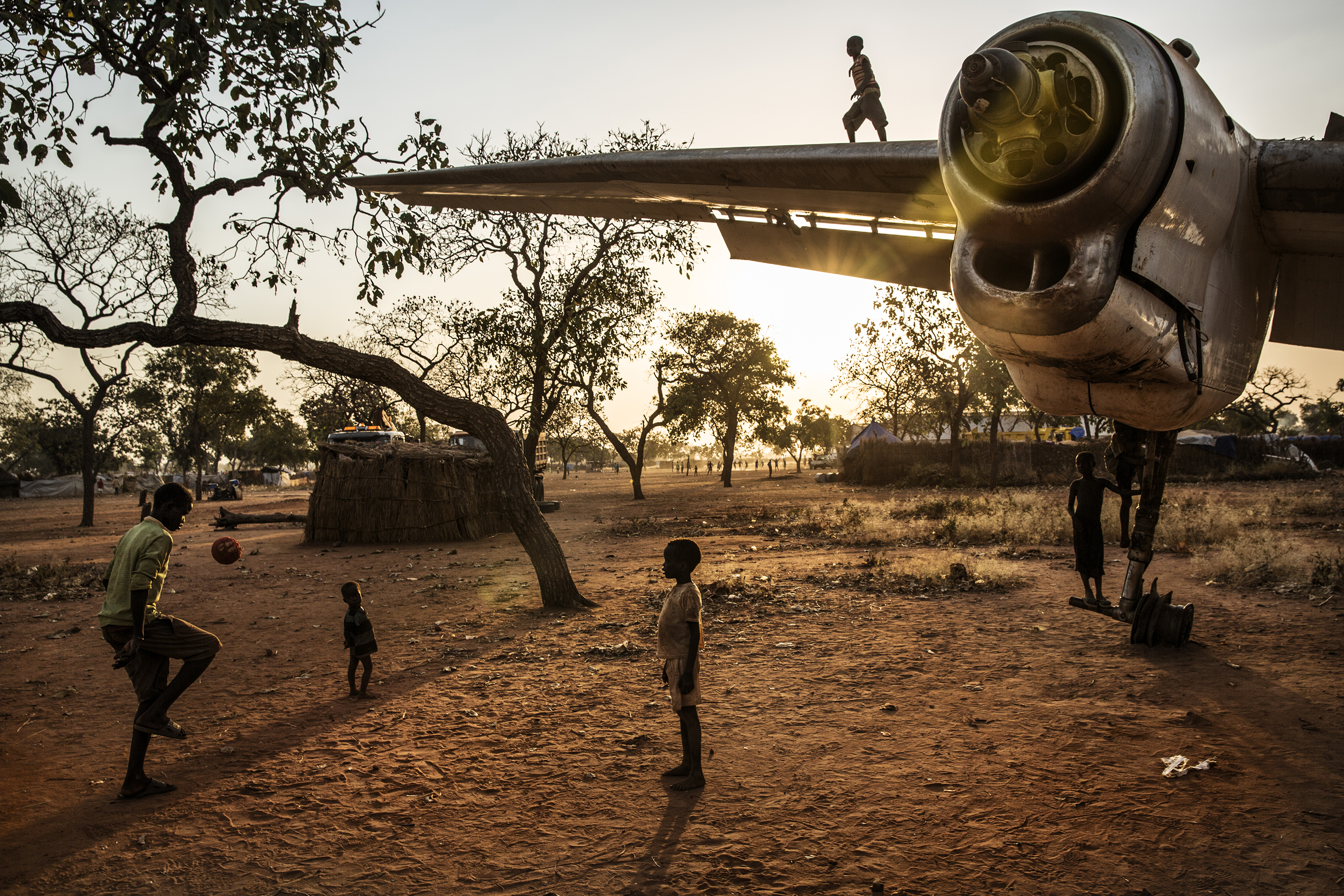
Children playing in Yida refugee camp

Yida is a settlement and refugee camp in Ruweng Administrative Area, South Sudan. In 2011 it had 20,000 people. As of June 2012, it has over 50,000. Yida is located in wetland, 12 km from border with Sudan. In the rainy season it is "virtually an island".

Yida was part of Unity state until the creation of Ruweng state in 2015 (later reorganized into an administrative area).

Since 2016, and in line with The Government of South Sudan's policy, UNHCR and partners have been actively engaged in relocating refugees from Yida to Jamjang camps, where refugees can receive multisectoral assistance
