= Charles Lwanga =

19th-century Ugandan catechist and martyr

Saint Charles Lwanga
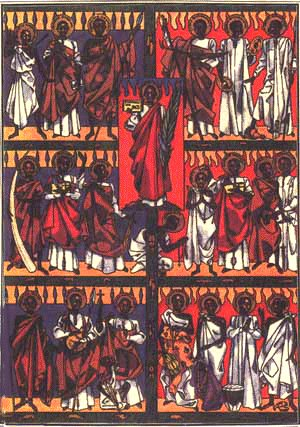
- St. Charles Lwanga and his companions

Martyr
- Born: 1 January 1860; Kingdom of Buganda
- Died: 3 June 1886 (aged 26); Namugongo, Kingdom of Buganda
- Venerated in: Catholic Church; Anglican Communion; Lutheranism
- Beatified: 1920, Rome, Kingdom of Italy, by Pope Benedict XV
- Canonized: 18 October 1964, St. Peter's Basilica, Vatican City by Pope Paul VI
- Major shrine: Basilica of the Uganda Martyrs, Munyonyo Martyrs Shrine
- Feast: 3 June
- Patronage: African Catholic Youth Action, converts, torture victims

Charles Lwanga (Luganda: Kaloli Lwanga; 1 January 1860 – 3 June 1886) was a Ugandan convert to the Catholic Church who was martyred with his companions and is revered as a saint by both the Catholic Church and the Anglican Communion.

A member of the Baganda tribe, Lwanga was born in the Kingdom of Buganda, the central and southern part of modern Uganda, and served as chief of the royal pages and later majordomo in the court of King Mwanga II of Buganda. Lwanga was baptised by Father Giraud on 15 November 1885.

In fear of losing the overbearing power he had on his subjects to a Christian worldview, King Mwanga II insisted that Christian converts abandon their new faith and executed many Anglicans and Catholics between 1885 and 1887, including Lwanga and other officials in the royal court or otherwise close to him.

== Martyrdom ==
The persecution started after Mwanga ordered a massacre of Anglican missionaries, including Bishop James Hannington who was the leader of the Anglican community. Joseph Mukasa Balikuddembe, the Catholic servant of the court and a lay catechist, reproached the king for the killings, against which he had counseled him. Mwanga had Balikuddembe beheaded and arrested all of his followers on 15 November 1885. The king then ordered that Lwanga, who was chief page at that time, take up Balikuddembe's duties. That same day, Lwanga and other pages under his protection sought baptism as Catholics by a missionary priest of the White Fathers; some hundred catechumens were baptized. Lwanga often protected boys in his charge from the king's sexual advances.

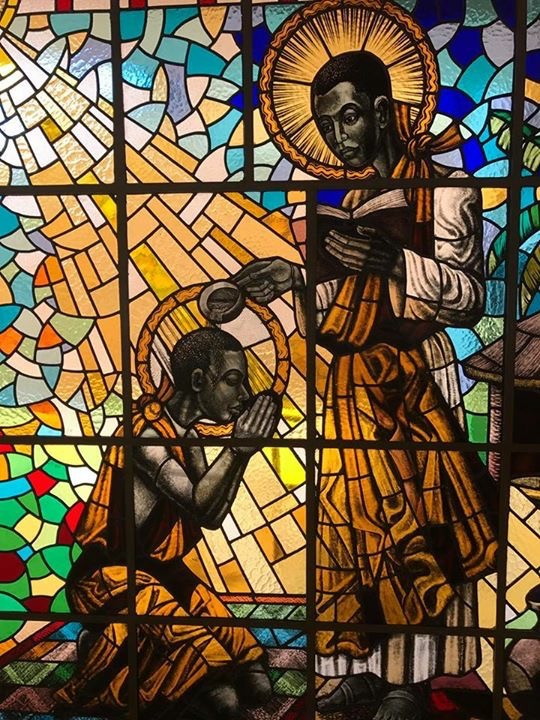
Saint Kizito being baptised by St. Charles Lwanga at Munyonyo – stained glass at Munyonyo Martyrs Shrine

On 25 May 1886, Mwanga ordered a general assembly of the court while they were settled at Munyonyo, where he condemned two of the pages to death. The following morning, Lwanga secretly baptized those of his charges who were still only catechumens. Later that day, the king called a court assembly in which he interrogated all present to see if any would renounce Christianity. Led by Lwanga, the royal pages declared their fidelity to their religion, upon which the king condemned them to death, directing that they be marched to the traditional place of execution. Three of the prisoners, Pontian Ngondwe, Athanasius Bazzekuketta, and Gonzaga Gonza, were murdered on the march there.

When preparations were completed and the day had come for the execution on 3 June 1886, Lwanga was separated from the others by the Guardian of the Sacred Flame for private execution, in keeping with custom. As he was being burnt, Lwanga said to the Guardian, "It is as if you are pouring water on me. Please repent and become a Christian like me."

Twelve Catholic boys and men and nine Anglicans were then burnt alive. Another Catholic, Mbaga Tuzinde, was clubbed to death for refusing to renounce Christianity, and his body was thrown into the furnace to be burned along with those of Lwanga and the others. The fury of the king was particularly inflamed against the Christians because they adamantly refused to participate in sexual acts with him. As previously mentioned, Lwanga, in particular, had protected the pages. The executions were also motivated by Mwanga's broader efforts to avoid foreign threats to his power. According to Assa Okoth, Mwanga's overriding preoccupation was for the "integrity of his kingdom", and perceived that men such as Lwanga were working with foreigners in "poisoning the very roots of his kingdom". Not to have taken any action could have led to suggestions that he was a weak sovereign.

== Veneration ==
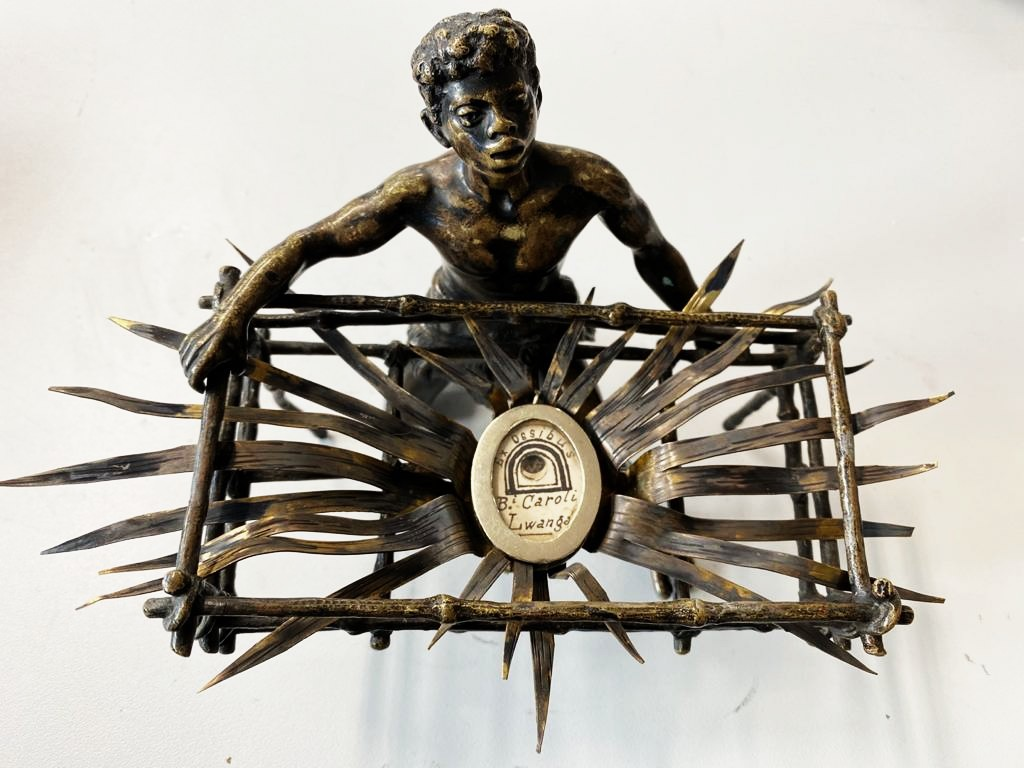
Private reliquary of Saint Charles Lwanga

Lwanga senior and the other Catholics who accompanied him in death were canonized on 18 October 1964 by Pope Paul VI during the Second Vatican Council. "To honor these African saints, Paul VI became the first reigning pope to visit the sub-Saharan Africa when he toured Uganda in July 1969, a visit that included a pilgrimage to the site of the martyrdom at Namugongo."

The Basilica of the Uganda Martyrs was built at the site of the executions and serves as their shrine. The Brothers of St. Charles Lwanga Senior (Luganda: Bannakaroli Brothers) were founded in 1927 as an indigenous religious congregation of Ugandan men committed to providing education to the disadvantaged youth of their country.

In the United States, Lwanga is honored by St. Charles Anglican Cathedral in the Diocese of Cascadia. In 2013, St. Cecilia Parish in Detroit, Michigan merged with St. Leo Parish and was renamed as St. Charles Lwanga Parish to represent the African American community in the inner-city of Detroit and continue Lwanga's legacy.

== See also ==
- Catholic Church in Uganda
- Saint Charles Lwanga, patron saint archive
