= Rinkeby Swedish =

Variety of Swedish

Rinkeby Swedish (Swedish: Rinkebysvenska [ˈrɪ̂ŋːkɛbyːˌsvɛnska]) is any of a number of varieties of Swedish spoken mainly in urban districts with a high proportion of immigrant residents which emerged as a linguistic phenomenon in the 1980s. Rinkeby in Stockholm is one such suburb, but the term Rinkeby Swedish may sometimes be used for similar varieties in other Swedish cities as well. A similar term is Rosengårdssvenska ("Rosengård Swedish") after the Rosengård district in Malmö. The one magazine in Sweden published in these varieties, Gringo, proposes miljonsvenska ("Million Swedish") based on the Million Programme.

Different varieties of Rinkeby Swedish exist which are based on the regional dialects, especially in the major urban centers of Stockholm (Svealand dialects), Malmö (Scanian) and Gothenburg (western Götaland dialects).

== Classification ==
Opinions among linguists differ on whether to regard Rinkeby Swedish as a sociolect, dialect, ethnolect, or maybe a "multiethnolect". Since the number of influencing languages involved is rather large, and extremely few speakers are likely to be fluent in more than a few of these, the definition of pidgin language may appear more accurate than that of mixed language. The varieties may also be characterized as a register for informal communication between peers, since the speakers often use them only in specific social contexts and switch to other varieties where appropriate.

== Use ==
Professor Ulla-Britt Kotsinas, a scholar frequently cited on Rinkeby Swedish, argues that these varieties primarily are spoken by teenagers from suburbs where immigrants and immigrant descendants are concentrated, and can be interpreted as expressions of youth culture: The language is a marker of belonging to a certain subculture and at the same time opposition to a perceived mainstream non-immigrant culture that seems not to value the immigrant descendants.

Rinkeby Swedish and similar varieties thus express belonging to the rather large group of youths with roots in other countries that have grown up in immigrant neighborhoods in a post-industrial society and with a disproportionately high unemployment rate for youths with immigrant background. Except for the fact that the linguistic distance is greater, Kotsinas sees in principle no difference from the suburban and urban working class varieties that followed Industrial Revolution and urbanization a century ago.

Many words from Rinkeby Swedish have now been incorporated into all kinds of other Swedish youth slang and are used by many young people without immigrant heritage as a marker of group solidarity and identity.

== Distinctive traits ==
Variants of Rinkeby Swedish are reported from suburbs of Stockholm, Uppsala, Malmö, and Gothenburg with a predominantly immigrant population. These variants tend to be based on the local town accents, or on the variety of Standard Swedish taught in school. These varieties can be described as having a somewhat simplified version of the Swedish grammar and a richness of loanwords from the languages of the countries the speakers' parents or grandparents originated in: mainly Turkish, with traces of Kurdish, Arabic, Greek, Persian, Serbo-Croatian, Syriac, and to some extent Latin American Spanish. Many English words and some English grammar are also used, due to a fairly widespread identification with African Americans and the appreciation of rap and hip hop music and culture.

Among younger speakers, the different varieties show a considerable variation in vocabulary and to some extent in grammar and syntax. However, they all share some grammatical similarities, such as discarding the Verb-second word order of Standard Swedish, instead using subject–verb–object word order after an adverb or adverbial phrase (as in English, compare Idag jag tog bussen ("Today I took the bus") to Standard Swedish Idag tog jag bussen ("Today took I the bus").

== Sample vocabulary ==
| Phrase | Translation | Origin |
|---|---|---|
| aina | police (singular and plural) | Turkish aynasız (meaning mirrorless). Turkish undercover police cars used to not have side mirrors and could be identified that way. |
| axa | go, leave | Swedish accelerera, "to accelerate" |
| baxa | steal (Stockholm) | Possibly Swedish baxa, "to lug" |
| chilla (also softa) | (to) chill; take it easy; to be calm | both variants from English |
| fet (adjective) fett (adverb) | cool; nice; very | Literally Swedish for "fat", used to emphasize a subsequent word. (noun) |
| flos | money | Arabic |
| gitta | go; get going; run away | Turkish (gitmek) git (go, imperative) |
| guzz / guss | girl | Turkish kız |
| -ish/-isch | common word ending | |
| hajde | hurry; get moving | Turkish (haydi); also common in Balkan languages (hajde, ajde; often hajde bre) |
| jalla | hurry; get moving | Arabic (Swedish spelling of Arabic "yalla") |
| keff | bad, negative, broken and similar | Arabic (opposite meaning) |
| knatch | small piece of cannabis | possibly from dialectal Swedish knerts, "small piece (of matter)" |
| len | boy; bro; guy | Turkish lan < ulan < oğlan (meaning boy) |
| loco | crazy | Spanish |
| mannen | familiar addressing, "hey, man; my man; friend" | Swedish, possibly an English calque |
| para | money | Serbo-Croatian para or Turkish para |
| sho | greeting, can be used as "hello" or "goodbye" (means "what" in Arabic). | Arabic or Italian (cf. ciao), Swedish slang tjo pronounced "sho" |
| shuno, shunne, shurda | guy; dude; bloke | From the Swedish word person |
| soft (adj.) / softa (verb) | cool, good, nice (or calm down if used as a verb) | English |
| tagga | get away | synonymous with gitta |
| wallah | I swear to God | Arabic |

== Literary use ==
Novels written partially or completely in Rinkeby Swedish include

- Till vår ära by Alejandro Leiva Wenger; ("To our honour")
- Ett öga rött by Jonas Hassen Khemiri; ("One eye red")
- Shoo Bre by Douglas Foley
- Kalla det vad fan du vill by Marjaneh Bakhtiari. ("Call it whatever the hell you want")

== See also ==
- Multicultural London English
- Multicultural Toronto English
- Swedish hip hop
- Post-war Sweden
- Swedish dialects
- Kebabnorsk
- Perkerdansk
- Ebonics
