= Marjan =

Marjan may refer to:

== Places ==
=== Albania ===
- Marjan, Gorë, a village in Gorë Municipality, Korçë District
- Marjan, Lekas, a village in Lekas Municipality, Korçë District

=== Iran ===
- Marjan, Alborz, a village
- Marjan, Fars, a village
- Marjan, Isfahan, a village
- Marjan, Kerman, a village
- Marjan Babamorad, a village
- Marjan Gomar, a village
- Marjan Qeytul, a village

=== Elsewhere ===
- Marjan, Split, a hill on the peninsula of the city of Split, Croatia
- Al Marjan Island, a man-made archipelago of four islands in Al Jazirah Al Hamra, Ras al-Khaimah, United Arab Emirates

== Other uses ==
- Marjan (film), 1956 Iranian film
- Marjan (name), a given name (includes a list of people with the name)
- Marjan (singer), Iranian pre-revolutionary actress and singer
- Marjan (lion), who once lived in the Kabul Zoo

== See also ==
- Marjane (disambiguation)
- Marian (disambiguation)
- Maryan (disambiguation)
