= Joseph Namukangula =

- Born: 1937 (age 88–89); Narozari Village, Buwungu, Masaka District, Uganda
- Citizenship: Ugandan
- Education: Bukalasa Minor Seminary; Katigondo Major Seminary; College of Catholic Church Music and Music Pedagogy, Regensburg
- Occupations: Roman Catholic priest; composer; musicologist; music educator
- Known for: Catholic liturgical music
- Awards: Meritorious Award (2025)

Joseph Namukangula is a Ugandan Roman Catholic priest, composer, musicologist and music educator from the Masaka Diocese.

== Early life and education background ==
Namukangula was born in 1937 in Narozari Village, Buwungu, in Masaka District. He attended Narozari Primary School before joining Bukalasa Minor Seminary, where he developed his musical abilities through the brass band, choir, and organ music.

In 1961, he joined Katigondo Major Seminary, where he studied philosophy and theology while continuing to develop his musical skills. During his studies, he was introduced to European classical music, including the works of Palestrina and Mozart, as well as Gregorian music. After beginning his priestly ministry, he received a scholarship to pursue advanced studies in church music and music pedagogy at the College of Catholic Church Music and Music Pedagogy in Regensburg, Germany.

== Priesthood and career journey ==
Namukangula was ordained a Catholic priest on 10 December 1967 by Bishop Adrian Ddungu at Kimanya Parish. From 1968 to 1973, he served at Kitovu Cathedral, where Bishop Ddungu tasked him with strengthening church singing and establishing a strong choir. During his time there, Namukangula established the St. Cecilia Choir.

He was transferred to Makondo Parish, where he served as parish priest from 1973 to 1975. He later returned to Bukalasa Minor Seminary, where he taught music, Latin, and Luganda.

== Compositions ==
Namukangula is a Ugandan Catholic liturgical composer. His compositions include Omugaati Gwo Bulamu, Beteremu Gwe Namukisa, Magnificat, Mumpita Ani, Abasomi Mujje Tusome, Azze Omwagalwa Waffe, and Ugend'e Betelemu. He also composed the Masaka City anthem.

== Honours ==
In June 2025, the Music Committee of the Catholic Diocese of Masaka awarded Namukangula a Meritorious Award in recognition of his contribution to Catholic church music.

== See also ==
- Expedito Magembe
- James Kabuye
- Kivebulaya
