= Kebabnorsk =

Language variant of Norwegian

Kebab norsk (pronounced [ˈkêːbɑbˌnɔʂk]), also known as Kebab Norwegian or Norwegian multiethnolect, is a language variant of Norwegian that incorporates words and grammatical structures from languages spoken by immigrants to Norway such as Turkish, Kurdish, Arabic, Urdu, Pashto, Persian, Punjabi, Tamil, and Chilean Spanish, as well as English. The multiethnolect differs from an ethnolect because it is spoken not by one particular ethnic group, but by the many varying immigrant populations in Norway, drawing elements from each of their respective languages. The Norwegian multiethnolect emerged from immigrant youth communities, particularly those in eastern neighborhoods of Oslo, and has spread to broader youth populations through permeation of mainstream Norwegian media. The term sociolect is also useful when discussing this variant, because sociological factors such as age, neighborhood, ethnic identity, and gender play important roles in classifying and understanding Norwegian multiethnolect.

The Norwegian multiethnolect was first identified in the 1990s, and in 1995 the Norwegian scholar Stine Aasheim wrote her M.A. thesis on the subject titled: "Kebab-norsk: fremmedspråklig påvirkning på ungdomsspråket i Oslo." Kebab-norsk is the original name used to identify to the variant, with "kebab" referring to a popular Middle Eastern dish of the same name. This terminology is based on stereotypes of its users, and thus the name "Norwegian multiethnolect" is becoming increasingly more common. The first dictionary of Norwegian multiethnolect was published in 2005 by Andreas Eilert Østby, Kebabnorsk ordbok.

Since then, the variation has grown steadily more represented in the media, appearing first in literature, before making its way into music, film, and television. A number of large European cities have emerging multiethnolects, often prevalent in working class neighborhoods with high populations of immigrants, for example Kanak Sprak in Berlin, Perkerdansk in Copenhagen, Multicultural London English in London, Rinkeby Swedish in Stockholm, and Straattaal in Rotterdam.

== Immigration to Norway ==
=== Post-World War II immigration ===
After the end of World War II, western European countries that were a part of the NATO Alliance and the anti-communist bloc began receiving a large influx labor immigrants from less industrialized countries. Norway was largely unaffected during this post-war rush, although belonging to this bloc, the vast majority of laborers settling in France and Germany. Refugees, often those escaping from countries in the communist bloc such as Czechoslovakia and Hungary, but also Jewish populations, comprised a noteworthy immigrant demographic in the 1950s and 1960s. However, due to lower relative attraction when compared with other Western European nations, very few settled in Norway. Those who did were offered housing and jobs, yet many reflected that their "foreignness" led to their exclusion from Norwegian society, especially Jewish immigrants, who also dealt with Anti-Semitic attitudes. Norway's foreign-born population continued to decline through the census of 1950, and Norway did not become a net immigration country until 1968. In the year 1970, only 1.3 percent of the Norwegian population was foreign citizens, of which 46.7 percent came from Nordic countries. Only 5 percent of the immigrant population came from Asia, Latin America, Africa, and the Middle East.

=== Labor immigration of the 1970s ===
By the end of the 1960s, demands for labor were beginning to reach their saturation point in other Western nations and regulations around immigration began to increase. Norway began experiencing its first waves of immigration in the late 1960s and early 1970s when laborers came to meet the needs of Norway's still-growing industries. The largest group of immigrants were laborers from Pakistan, followed by Morocco and Turkey. They were known as fremmedarbeidere, or foreign workers, and increasingly concerns grew around this demographic being exploited for cheap labor due to a lack of understanding of Norwegian, and lack of education for their children. Due to concerns around Norway's ability to integrate new foreign populations, Norwegian authorities instituted a yearlong immigration stop on non-Nordic labor immigrants in July 1974. The conversation around immigration in Norway primarily became an issue of whether immigrants would be able to assimilate into Norwegian culture, or if they would maintain their own. The job market had room to accommodate new immigrants in blue-collar positions, but immigration restrictions and labor regulation steadily increased throughout the decade. Similar to the experience of earlier refugee populations, discrimination on the basis of nationality and ethnicity continued to serve as the largest obstacle many immigrants would face.

=== Asylum seekers ===
The next significant wave of immigrants came in the mid-1970s through the 1990s with refugees and asylum seekers from all around Europe, Asia, and Africa. The number of asylum seekers increased significantly in this decade, such that it surpassed the allotted quotas for refugee populations and the Norwegian government had little opportunity to plan for and anticipate these waves of immigrants. Following the Vietnam War, a significant number of Vietnamese asylum seekers found their way to Norway. Following the coup d'état in Chile in 1973 and subsequent Pinochet regime, a number of Chilean refugees made their way to Norway. Both of these demographics reported feeling loneliness and isolation from the greater Norwegian populace, largely due to linguistic differences. By 1987, Norway housed asylum seekers from 60 countries, with the largest numbers coming from Iran, Chile, Sri Lanka, and Yugoslavia. As Norway joined the Schengen area in the 1990s, immigration policy continued to become increasingly restrictive. The topic of illegal immigration became hotly debated across Europe, yet many refugees managed to stay in Norway even without the necessary documentation on humanitarian grounds.

=== Current immigration statistics ===
These waves of immigration marked the beginning of Norway, and more specifically Oslo, as an increasingly multicultural place with a great breadth of linguistic diversity. At the beginning of 2021, there were 800,000 immigrants in Norway. The largest share of immigrants in 2021 came from Poland, followed by Lithuania, Sweden, Syria, and Somalia. At the beginning of 2021, there were 197,900 Norwegians born to immigrant parents in Norway. In Oslo specifically, the population of immigrants and Norwegian-born with immigrant parents accounts for 33.1 percent of the city's population. The countries most strongly represented in Oslo are Pakistan, Poland, Somalia, and Sweden. The majority of these immigrants live in the neighborhoods of Stovner, Alna, and Søndre Nordstrand, where roughly half of the population has an immigrant background. The ever-growing diversity of ethnic groups within Oslo has led to the proliferation of the Norwegian multiethnolect, a variant which reflects the many languages from which it draws vocabulary and grammar.

== Neighborhoods of Oslo ==
The three neighborhoods of Oslo with the highest immigrant populations are Stovner, Alna, and Søndre Nordstrand, each with an immigrant population of over 50 percent, but other neighborhoods with significant immigrant populations are Bjerke, Grorud, Gamle Oslo, and Grünerløkka, each at about 35 percent. The largest immigrant population in Oslo comes from Pakistan, at roughly 22,000 people. Around 13,000–14,000 people come from Poland, with similar numbers coming from Sweden and Somalia. Districts of Oslo hold different immigrant demographics, with the majority of immigrants coming from Somalia, Pakistan and Sri Lanka living in the outer eastern districts, while immigrants coming from Poland and Sweden live in inner eastern districts. In Groruddalen and Søndre Nordstrand, Norwegian-born to immigrant parents makes up 16 percent of the population, which is greater than the 7 percent from all of Oslo and 2.5 percent from the total country.

From 2008 to 2014, the population of Oslo grew 14 percent. The population growth in Oslo of non-immigrant populations is 4 percent, while the population growth of immigrant populations is 40 percent. In Grünerløkka, the population with an immigrant background has grown by over 50 percent in six years, while the immigrant populations in Bjerke and Gamle Oslo increased by 40 percent, closer to Oslo's average. The neighborhoods Groruddalen and Søndre Nordstrand amount to 27 percent of Oslo's total population, while they account for 38 percent of the immigrant population and 60 percent of the population of those Norwegian-born to immigrant parents.

A study of language use in Grønland, a neighborhood in the Gamle Oslo district where the immigrant and Norwegian-born to immigrant population is roughly 35 percent of the population, showed that signage in the neighborhood appeared not just in Norwegian, but also in English, Urdu, a language popularly spoken in Pakistan and thus prevalent in neighborhoods with the most Pakistani immigrants, Tamil, Kurdish, and Arabic, among other languages. While a majority of signs were in Norwegian at 52.5 percent, signs intended only for immigrant viewers appeared oftentimes in neither Norwegian nor English. Things such as handwritten notes, posters, and parts of names of cafes and shops composed the 2.8 percent of signs in Urdu, and 1.1 percent of signs written in each Tamil, Kurdish, and Arabic.

== Linguistic interference ==
Language transfer, or interference, is the insertion of qualities from one's native language into a different language by bilingual and multilingual language speakers. The concept of interference is central to the study of the Norwegian multiethnolect. It can be observed in any ethnolect, although the concept becomes more complicated with multiple languages interacting. In the case of the Norwegian multiethnolect, features from an immigrant's native language influence their speech patterns when speaking Norwegian. However, the speakers of Norwegian multiethnolect may have a wide variety of native languages. In the case of Norwegian-born people with immigrant parents, Norwegian may be their first language. Therefore, Norwegian multiethnolect draws its vocabulary and influence from a large variety of languages, and speakers of Norwegian multiethnolect might use language that derives from a language which the speaker themselves does not know. Speakers of Norwegian multiethnolect speak in a way that reflects a large variety of languages because of the linguistic diversity of the community at large, rather than the linguistic background of an individual.

This emphasizes the sociolinguistic elements of the Norwegian multiethnolect: it is a sociolect along with a multiethnolect, because while any given individual may not belong to all of the ethnic and linguistic communities which contribute to the multiethnolect, their social environment still includes all of these people. This diverges from the conventional definition of interference; rather than interference occurring on an individual level, it occurs at the level of an entire community, and thus affects all community members. Some research suggests that this kind of interference can be understood as a shift away from the original ethnic or multiethnic association of a vernacular. Instead of the vernacular being associated with the language it comes from, it's associated with the new geographic and social framework of where the multiethnolect is spoken. This means that Norwegian multiethnolect is more closely associated with the neighborhoods where it's spoken in Oslo and the immigrant youth demographics that speak it than with the language or ethnicity of origin. Youth from neighborhoods and social groups that use Norwegian multiethnolect use it to strengthen a sense of belonging with their in-group, rather than because of genuine interference from their native tongue.

== Perception of Norwegian multiethnolect by standard Eastern Norwegian speakers ==
When Norwegian multiethnolect first emerged as a variant of Norwegian in the 1990s, it was associated with linguistic innovation, self-expression, and creativity. Many speakers of Norwegian multiethnolect proudly identified with "Kebabnorsk," but into the 2000s and early 2010s it became associated with "bad Norwegian". As this became the overwhelming perception of Norwegian multiethnolect, more speakers came to distance themselves from the term. Hip hop music has also long been associated with Norwegian multiethnolect, but even these artists in the 2000s began to prefer the terms gatenorsk (street Norwegian) and asfaltnorsk (asphalt Norwegian) to better represent their language. The progression of self-identification with Norwegian multiethnolect has shifted in response to the changing perception of this variation by standard Eastern Norwegian speakers.

In recent times, media has tended towards positive and sympathetic representation of Norwegian multiethnolect, but workplace discrimination and other forms of discrimination have not lessened. Researchers at the University of Oslo have acknowledged Norwegian multiethnolect as a legitimate variant of Norwegian and demonstrated that its usage is the result of intentional linguistic expression, not of mistakes or an inability to speak "proper Norwegian." Bente Ailin Svendsen, a language professor at the University of Oslo, has been one of the most vocal advocates for the legitimacy of Norwegian multiethnolect and in 2020 she published an article to the Norwegian publication Vårt Land in its support.

TV-series and media using Norwegian multiethnolect have also popularized the variant, especially among their target youth audiences. The actors of the shows 17 and 18 have expressed pride that their language is being used by young people around all of Norway. While the early 2000s constituted a period of much more debate surrounding Norwegian multiethnolect, the current era of language usage is much more normalized because of the amount of popular language featuring it. Bente Ailin Svendsen from the University of Oslo believes that because the series 17 and 18 and books like Tante Ulrikkes vei are so enjoyable, Norwegian youth are adapting to Norwegian multiethnolect. She states: "The series are popular. Things that are popular are often taken into usage by youth."

Recent racist backlash to Norwegian multiethnolect persists. In 2020, the consultant Hans Geelmuyden, founder of the PR agency Geelmuyden Kiese, said that Norwegian multiethnolect does not have a place in his firm. He stated that he supports diverse hiring practices, as long as the applicants don't speak in Norwegian multiethnolect. This reflects the existing stigma against Norwegian multiethnolect in professional spaces. While some media came to his defense, insisting that he had the right to set standards for his hiring practices and that hard-working immigrants who learned "proper Norwegian" still had the chance to be hired, the majority of the public's reaction to Geelmuyden's discriminatory hiring was negative. An article from 2009 in the Norwegian newspaper Dagsavisen showcases similar concerns, with the article revealing the unspoken consensus among Norwegian multiethnolect speakers and hiring managers alike that using Norwegian multiethnolect in job interviews and other professional settings will decrease odds of being hired. While linguists and researchers readily confirm that Norwegian multiethnolect is a legitimate form of Norwegian, young speakers looking to enter the job market are aware of their systemic disadvantage.

== Code switching ==
In Norway, the study of sociolects is difficult to separate from the much more documented conversation and research around ethnolects, particularly the Norwegian multiethnolect. Depending on what neighborhood an individual resides in, what ethnicity they are, what language their parents speak, whether they are an immigrant or Norwegian-born to immigrant parents, what generation they are a part of, and where they attend school or work are all important sociological factors that affect speech patterns of Norwegian multiethnolect users. Whether a speaker of Norwegian multiethnolect uses Norwegian multiethnolect or standard Eastern Norwegian depends on social context, thus making the term sociolect useful. In a study by Marte Bivand Erdal and Mette Strømsø, one participant stated: "Of course, I don't speak like this when I'm at work". This speaker was identified as a user of Norwegian multiethnolect who self-identifies as an utlending (foreigner) but still lives within the dominant Norwegian society and chooses to use standard Eastern Norwegian at work. This study and this example highlight the importance of social context when users of Norwegian multiethnolect determine how to speak. The study suggests that in the workplace, ethnically Norwegian coworkers and customers may not be tolerant of the language of a Norwegian multiethnolect speaker and discriminate against them for being unprofessional. Within the geographic landscape of Oslo, Norwegian multiethnolect speakers use their language differently in different settings, a term which is known as code-switching.

== Linguistic differences between Norwegian multiethnolect and standard Eastern Norwegian ==
Norwegian multiethnolect varies from standard Eastern Norwegian in ways that are lexical, syntactical, and morphological. The most easily identifiable aspect of the Norwegian multiethnolect is the large vocabulary of words which are drawn from other languages. While many of these terms are standard to Norwegian multiethnolect, their spellings are not. A wide variety of spellings are common and accepted in Norwegian multiethnolect. Some common terms include:

Common terms in Norwegian multiethnolect
| Term | Origin | Norwegian Translation | English Translation |
|---|---|---|---|
| Avor | | å gå | to go |
| Broshan | Cf. Swedish "brushan" | bror | brother |
| Digge | English, cf. Swedish "digga" | å like | to like, to dig |
| Kæze | | å banke | to fight |
| Khoya | Arabic | bror | brother |
| Sahbi/Saheb | Arabic | kompis | friend |
| Flus | Arabic | penger | money |
| Lægs | | penger | money |
| Jalla | Arabic | kom igjen, skynd deg | come on, hurry up |
| Jette | English | å stikke | to leave |
| Kæbe | Urdu | tøs | slut |
| Mæbe | | dame | lady |
| Pæze/pæse | English | å sende over noe | to pass (something) |
| Schpa | | digg | good, cool |
| Sjofe/schofa | Arabic | å se | to see |
| Tært | Urdu | fin | attractive |
| Schmø | | fin | fine |
| Tæsje | | å lure/stjele | to steal |
| Wallah/Wollah/Walla/Wolla | Arabic | jeg sverger | I swear |

In addition to lexical traits, there are a number of syntactical markers of Norwegian multiethnolect. For the most part, this consists of variations to standard sentence structure. For example, Norwegian multiethnolect often ignores V2 word order, and will emit the standard Norwegian inversion after the first clause in a sentence or adverb usage. Another example of changed sentence structure is that in Norwegian, the negative marker ikke typically follows the verb, yet in Norwegian multiethnolect ikke can appear before or after the verb in embedded clauses. The frequent addition of adverbs leads to some changes in traditional word order. The frequent usage of the word sånn is a marker of Norwegian multiethnolect, and similar trends have been observed in both Swedish and German multiethnolects. The preposition "på" is often overused in Norwegian multiethnolect as compared to standard Eastern Norwegian as well, as it is one of the most common prepositions and this particular trend is popular among many speakers of Norwegian as a second language, extending beyond the parameters of Norwegian multiethnolect.

Lastly, there are also morphological indicators of Norwegian multiethnolect. Similar to multiethnolects in other Germanic languages, Norwegian multiethnolect demonstrates an over usage of the masculine gender, rather than the female or neuter genders that also exist in Norwegian. While the masculine gender is the most common gender for nouns in the Norwegian language, in Norwegian multiethnolect the masculine gender is often applied to words that are otherwise neuter or female. Additionally, the plural definitive ending for nouns in standard Norwegian is typically "-ene." However, in Norwegian multiethnolect the ending "-a" for plural definitive nouns is very common. The "-a" ending is also common for verbs in the past tense.

== In popular culture ==
The first piece of literature written using Norwegian multiethnolect was a translation of the Swedish novel Ett öga rött (One Red Eye) by Jonas Hassen Khemiri, a novel about immigrants in Sweden speaking a Swedish multiethnolect called Rinkebysvenska. The translation was done by Andreas Eilert Østby, who also published the first Norwegian multiethnolect dictionary. In 2007, a hip hop production of Romeo and Juliet was staged in Norwegian multiethnolect in Oslo. In 2008, Norwegian multiethnolect was showcased in the film 99% Ærlig (99% Honest), a movie about youth in East Oslo. In 2015, Maria Navarro Skaranger published the novel Alle utlendinger har lukka gardiner (All the foreigners have closed their curtains), showcasing Norwegian multiethnolect and capturing the life of a young girl and her immigrant family in Oslo. It was later made into a film. In 2017 Zeshan Shakar published the novel Tante Ulrikkes vei (Tante Ulrikke's Road) using Norwegian multiethnolect in order to give a realistic picture of the upbringing of two young boys in an immigrant neighborhood in Oslo in the early 2000s. The fourth season of the popular Norwegian television show Skam (Shame), which was released in 2017, focused on a teenaged Muslim girl as the main character and introduced several new characters that use Norwegian multiethnolect. In September 2018, the Norwegian TV show 17 premiered, following the life of a young immigrant boy in east Oslo as he copes with family, friends, and school. The series heavily uses Norwegian multiethnolect. The following seasons were titled 18, 16, and 19, respectively. Premiering in 2019, the TV series Førstgangstjenesten (First Time Service) portrays the mandatory military service period of several young Norwegians, including a Norwegian multiethnolect speaker from eastern Oslo. In 2020, Zeshan Shakar published a second novel using Norwegian multiethnolect titled Gul Bok (Yellow Book) about a young professional in Oslo who seeks to understand both his immigrant and professional identities.

Many rappers and Norwegian hip hop musicians use Norwegian multiethnolect, such as Karpe, Hkeem, Isah, and Unge Ferrari. Oftentimes their music discusses themes of feeling othered by Norwegian popular culture, celebrating their heritage and backgrounds, and facing discrimination due to having an immigrant background. In 2019, the hip hop duo Karpe released the album Sas Plus/Sas Pussy to critical acclaim, a 30-minute long song which used not only Norwegian multiethnolect, but also a wide variety of languages and soundscapes which reflect the lives and backgrounds of immigrants to Oslo. This song exemplifies the ways that the usage of Norwegian multiethnolect in music allows for more nuanced reflection on the subject matter of being raised in an immigrant family and neighborhood in Norway.

== See also ==
- Multiethnolect
- Ethnolect
- Norwegian dialects
- Kiezdeutsch
- Rinkeby Swedish
- Perkerdansk
