= Marian =

Marian may refer to:

== People ==
- Marian (given name), a list of people with the given name
- Marian (surname), a list of people so named

== Places ==
- Marian, Iran (disambiguation)
- Marian, Queensland, a town in Australia
- Marian, a village in toe commune of Hîrtop, Transnistria, Moldova
- Lake Marian, New Zealand
- Marian Cove, King George Island, South Shetland Islands
- Mt Marian, Tasmania, a mountain in Australia
- Marian, Albania, a village near Lekas, Korçë County

== Christianity ==
- Marian, an adjective for things relating to the Blessed Virgin Mary (Roman Catholic), specifically Marian devotions
- Congregation of Marian Fathers, also known as Marians of the Immaculate Conception, a Roman Catholic male clerical congregation

== Schools ==
- Marian Academy, a Roman Catholic private school in Georgetown, Guyana
- Marian College (disambiguation)
- Marian High School (disambiguation)
- Marian University (Indiana)
- Marian University (Wisconsin)
- The Marian School, a Catholic private school in Currajong, Queensland, Australia

== Music ==
- "Marian", a song by the British gothic rock band The Sisters of Mercy
- Marian Records, a record label

== Other uses ==
- Maid Marian, legendary companion of Robin Hood
- Marian, an adjective for things relating to Gaius Marius
- Marian, an adjective for things relating to the Mari people of Russia
- Marian, a student of Mount St Mary's School (New Delhi), India
- Marian, a student of Saint Mary's University of Bayombong, Nueva Vizcaya, Philippines
- Marian Apartments (disambiguation), two places on the US National Register of Historic Places
- Marian Party, those Scots who remained loyal to Mary, Queen of Scots in the disputes following her deposition
- UCD Marian, an Irish basketball club

== See also ==
- Mariana (disambiguation)
- Marianne (disambiguation) - for the French spelling
- Marion (disambiguation)
- Merian (disambiguation)
- Marjan (disambiguation)
- Maryan (disambiguation)
