= Marian, Iran =

Marian or Mareyan (Persian: ماريان) in Iran may refer to:

- Marian, Fars
- Marian, Kerman
- Marian, Razavi Khorasan
