= Tante Ulrikkes Vei =

Norwegian novel

First edition

Tante Ulrikkes Vei is a Norwegian novel written by Zeshan Shakar. It was published by Gyldendal Norsk Forlag in 2017.

The novel describes the story of the upbringing of two young boys in the block street, Tante Ulrikkes vei in Stovner, which is a low-income neighbourhood in Oslo, Norway. The readers are being introduced to these young boys and their livelihoods along with their challenges and struggles through the surveys conducted by NOVA (Norwegian Research Institute for Upbringing, Welfare, and Aging).

Tante Ulrikkes Vei has gained enormous praise for the tackling of various social and political issues found in Norwegian cities. Shakar received two prestigious Norwegian awards for this novel, namely Tarjei Vesaas' debutantpris and Bokbloggerprisen (annual awards for literature in Norway). Norwegian newspapers such as VG, Aftenposten, and Klassekampen, have all applauded this novel with top scores, and the novel has sold over 150 000 copies. In addition, in the year of the publication, this novel was listed as one of the best sellers in Norway. This book has also been made into a theatre play after its success.

== Plot ==
Through the survey questionnaires, the boys describes their life experiences. The readers are made familiar with the plot, where one of the boys named Mohammed, better known as, ‘Mo’ is raised in a loving home. While the other boy, Jamal, faces terrible living conditions with a father that disappeared from his life and his family. Jamal was then left alone with a mentally ill mother and a little brother he had to take care of, as the mother was not capable of such. Mo was excellent in school and managed to pursue higher education. Jamal dropped out of school, in order to work and support his home. He, therefore, took advantage of undeclared jobs. When Mo answers the surveys, his language is well written. Jamal on the other hand, talks with a slang-based language known as ‘kebabnorsk’, a multiethnolect that has loanwords from languages spoken by non-western countries. Kebabnorsk is looked down upon and is negatively charged by the Norwegian society.

== Thematic ==
- Political issues – in relevance to integration.
- Social issues – in relevance to discrimination many can face inside the job market, airport, and everyday life. Especially if one comes from Stovner and other similar neighbourhoods. Also minorities specially those of non-western background.
- Gentrification
- Childhood/Adulthood
- Friendship
- Love – Romantic and platonic
- Individual challenges – such as, the need for belonging

The author touches upon a lot of elements such as social issues communities from the Stovner area can relate to. Being a low-income area, where several people face harsh living conditions, the author wanted to show a representation from the inside of these communities.

The general association the Norwegian society has towards Stovner is through media. The media has portrayed Stovner and its ‘people’ with a negative image and narrative, connected them to criminals, and labelled the people as careless in relevance to integration. Accordingly, the author wanted the story of Stovner and its people to be displayed from internal individuals, and not based on assumptions and prejudice from external actors. The author has also ensured that the readers gain an understanding that not all people from one area are ‘the same’, by illustrating Mo and Jamal – two different characters with different goals and ambitions. Also, by emphasizing on the fact that living conditions during one’s childhood and teenage life can play a crucial part in the outcome of someone’s adult life. Mo managed to pursue higher education, but he came from an economically stable and loving home. Shakar defends the stereotypical people from Stovner such as Jamal, by explaining that the use of kebabnorsk and failure to achieve higher education is linked to the hard realities and circumstances faced by many. Coming from such conditions, makes it difficult to find and achieve other opportunities in order to escape the ‘bad circle’.

After some years, Mo began University, grew a new circle of friends, and found an ethnic Norwegian girlfriend. Mo still felt as an outsider after these changes, and never attained belonging to the major Norwegian society. He held more the connection towards being a ‘Stovner-boy’ as people would assume and judge him regardless based on the place he came from, his ethnicity, and general background. The novel showcases the realities of the Norwegian society when it comes to integration, and Shakar managed well to address these problems between the major Norwegian community vs. the minority community.

== The author ==
Zeshan Shakar is a second-generation immigrant in Norway with Pakistani origin. Alongside being an author, he is also a Political Scientist and has in addition attained a degree in Economy from BI (Norwegian Business School). Currently, he is working in the Oslo Town Hall.

Shakar was born and raised in Stovner himself. Through several interviews, we learn how both the characters of Mo and Jamal with a mixture, reflects Shakar. Shakar was similar to Mo good in school and wanted to achieve something great in life. However, similarly to Jamal, Shakar always felt the proudness of coming from Stovner, the “hood”.

From the novel, there is one scene where Jamal expresses a dissatisfaction when the blocks of Tante Ulrikkes Vei are being renovated. He says (translated from Norwegian), “It was like, you come out the metro, and the station was really ghetto.... big graffities everywhere....and when you go out, you see the TUV (Tante Ulrikkes vei) blocks that are very ghetto also, and actually it was so cool, you get it? Because like, to be ghetto is our thing, and then I can be like, we are one of the bad ass ghetto places of Oslo, but now, it is not possible to say it so much. Now, the blocks are completely white, and looks so new and stuff, almost like other places in Oslo. Don't like this. Like, they just come and draw on my entire life and don't give a fuck, you get it? And also it will cost a bit more to live here now because the paint and other stuff arrived. Don't understand what those people in charge are trying to do tho...”

This scene mirrors an important societal issue, where some neighbourhoods are being flourished in order to attract new buyers. This issue is controversial. One can debate that it may contribute to ease the integration of “ghetto” neighbourhoods alongside removing discriminatory problems in such areas, but on the other hand, when new buyers arrive, the cost of living rises. As a result, many “former residents” cannot afford to live there anymore, therefore, many encounter eviction. The author can relate to the debate about gentrification from Jamal’s perspective.
