= Marjane =

Marjane may refer to:

== People ==
=== Given name ===
- Marjaneh Bakhtiari (born 1980), Iranian-Swedish author
- Marjaneh Golchin (born 1969), Iranian actress
- Marjane Satrapi (1969–2026), French and Iranian author and film maker

=== Surname ===
- Léo Marjane (1912–2016), French singer

== Other uses ==
- Marjan hill, in Split, Croatia
  - "Marjane, Marjane", a 1930s folk song
- Marjane (business), a Moroccan hypermarket chain (formed 1990)

== See also ==
- Marjan (disambiguation)
