= Multiethnolect =

Type of variety in sociolinguistics

A multiethnolect is a language variety, typically formed in youth communities in working-class, immigrant neighborhoods of urban areas, that contains influences from a variety of different languages. Unlike a singular ethnolect, which associates one language variety with one particular ethnic group, speakers of a multiethnolect often come from varied ethnic backgrounds, and their language usage can be more closely attributed to the neighborhood in which they live than to their nationality or to that of their parents. The term "multiethnolect" was coined by Clyne (2000) and Quist (2000). Research of multiethnolects has thus far focused primarily on urban areas in northwestern Europe, such as in Scandinavia, the Netherlands, Belgium, Germany, and Great Britain, but the phenomenon is far more widespread. Researchers Jacomine Nortier and Margreet Dorleijn call multiethnolects “a phenomenon of all times, that was only waiting for linguists to give it a name". Recent researchers often explore multiethnolects as a form of contact language: a language used for communication between two speakers who don't share a native tongue.

Multiethnolects appear to be less homogeneous than either dialects or sociolects and are assumed to be context-bound and transient, to the extent that they are "youth languages". Aasheim (1995) first coined the term kebabnorsk, referring to the Norwegian multiethnolect spoken primarily by immigrant youth in neighborhoods of eastern Oslo. Wiese (2006) uses the German term Kiezdeutsch, meaning "neighbourhood German", to refer to multiethnic youth-language in Germany. Cheshire et al. (2011) claim that the term Jafaican, which refers to youth language in multiethnic parts of London (the name has close associations with hip-hop), is a type of multiethnolect; many older people claim that young people in London today sound as if they are "talking black". Kotsinas (1988) uses the term rinkebysvenska (named after the district of Rinkeby) to refer to the Swedish characteristics of multiethnolects spoken in districts of Stockholm. Multiethnolects are considered to be a type of Labovian "vernacular".

The reasons for the emergence of European multiethnolects at this point in history is presumably linked to specific types of community formation in urban areas which have seen very large-scale immigration from developing countries. People of different language backgrounds have settled in already quite underprivileged neighbourhoods, and economic deprivation has led to the maintenance of close kin and neighbourhood ties. Castells (2000) writes of prosperous metropolises containing communities such as these: ‘It is this distinctive feature of being globally connected and locally disconnected, physically and socially, that makes mega-cities a new urban form’.

Cheshire, Nortier, and Adger state that "a defining characteristic is that [multiethnolects] are used by (usually monolingual) young people from non-immigrant backgrounds as well as by their bilingual peers".

== Examples of multiethnolects ==
=== Citétaal ===
In Belgium, the multiethnolect that has emerged among young immigrant populations is called Citétaal, or “City language.” It flourishes and is most documented in mining areas of Belgium that were formerly ghettoized, and incorporates influences from the older immigrant populations, such as Italians, and more recent populations, such as Moroccans. The native language in the eastern Belgian regions where Citétaal is most spoken is Flemish, and as a Germanic language, this multiethnolect shares common patterns with other multiethnolects in other Germanic languages. For example, similar to Scandinavian and Dutch multiethnolects, Citétaal speakers are likely to overuse the common gender, rather than the neuter gender. This is one of many instances of morphological overgeneralization that characterizes this multiethnolect, along with others like it. Speakers of Citétaal are primarily young Flemish speakers with an immigrant background, for whom “Citétaal is not used in order to be tough and cool but just for fun and to create a sense of togetherness." Once again, this demonstrates the role of communities and social groups rather than individual families in creating a multiethnolect.

=== German multiethnolect ===
In Germany, several different recently emerging multiethnolects have been documented, each with slight variation in their main demographic of speakers, and with the primary linguistic influences involved in each ethnolect varying slightly. However, in each of these multiethnolects, the Turkish language has played the most significant role in the language variant's formation. One name for the multiethnolect which is based primarily upon Turkish influences is Türkendeutsch, although this term proves far less popular than the somewhat controversial Kanaksprak. The very name of Kanaksprak reclaims a derogatory slur, kanak, which Germans used towards immigrants, especially those of Turkish descent. Another term used by researchers is Kiezdeutsch, meaning neighborhood German. A unique phenomenon which researchers have noted in regard to the German multiethnolect is that young male speakers use it far more than their female counterparts. In the attempts of young women to celebrate their ethnic and linguistic backgrounds in the face of sexist cultural norms, the sociological elements of multiethnolect formation once again reveal their importance.

=== Kebabnorsk ===
Kebabnorsk (from Kebab, a popular Middle Eastern dish) is one of the most famous examples of a multiethnolect, spoken in urban regions of Oslo with a large immigrant population. The languages most influential on Kebabnorsk are Kurdish, Turkish, Arabic, Persian, Pashto, Punjabi, Urdu, Tamil, Polish, and Chilean Spanish, as well as numerous other languages. The dialect began to develop in the 1970s when immigrants from Turkey, Morocco, and Pakistan started moving to Oslo, followed in the 1980s by refugees from countries including Iran, Chile, Sri Lanka, and Yugoslavia. Kebabnorsk may also be considered a sociolect, and is spoken more than ever now in Oslo.

== See also ==
- Kanaksprak
- Rinkebysvenska
- Perkerdansk
- Multicultural London English
- Multicultural Toronto English
- Madras Bashai
- Creole language
- Ethnolect
- Sociolinguistics

== Sources ==
- Cheshire, Jenny, Nortier, Jacomine, and Adger, David. 2015. Emerging Multiethnolects in Europe. Queen Mary's Occasional Papers in Advancing Linguistics. 33: 1-27.
- Cheshire, Jenny, Kerswill, Paul, Fox, Sue, and Torgersen, Eivind. 2011. Contact, the feature pool and the speech community: The emergence of Multicultural London English. Journal of Sociolinguistics 15: 151–196.
- Clyne, Michael. 2000. Lingua franca and ethnolects in Europe and beyond. Sociolinguistica 14: 83–89.
- Freywald, Ulrike, Mayr, Katharina, Özçelik, Tiner, Wiese, Heike. Kiezdeutsch as a multiethnolect. In Kern, Friederike & Selting, Margret (eds.). Panethnic Styles of Speaking in European Metropolitan Cities.
- Quist, Pia (2000). Ny københavnsk 'multietnolekt'. Om sprogbrug blandt unge i sprogligt og kulturelt heterogene miljøer. [New Copenhagen Multiethnolect. Language Use among Young Young Speakers in linguistically and culturally heterogeneous neighborhoods]. Danske Talesprog, (1), 143–211.
- Quist, Pia (2008). Sociolinguistic approaches to multiethnolect: language variety and stylistic practice. International Journal of Bilingualism, 12(1–2), 43–61.
- Wiese, Heike. 2006. “Ich mach dich Messer”: Grammatische Produktivität in Kiez-Sprache. Linguistische Berichte 207. 245–273.
- Wiese, Heike. 2009. Grammatical innovation in multiethnic urban Europe: New linguistic practices among adolescents. Lingua 119: 782–806.
