= Marian Apartments =

Marian Apartments may refer to:

- Marian Apartments (Griffin, Georgia), listed on the National Register of Historic Places (NRHP) in Spalding County, Georgia
- Marian Apartments (Lafayette, Indiana), also NRHP-listed
