= Perkerdansk =

Variety of Danish

Perkerdansk, Immigrant Danish or Gadedansk is a multi-ethnolect spoken in Denmark, a variety of Danish associated primarily with youth of Middle Eastern ethnic background. It is a contact variety that includes features of Danish as well as Arabic, Turkish, English and other immigrant languages. Particularly common in urban areas with high densities of immigrant populations, its features have also spread to general youth language in Denmark.

The term perkerdansk may be perceived as offensive, just as perker may be offensive slang for immigrants and descendants of primarily Middle-eastern origin. However, it may also be used as an endonym.

The following is an example of Danish spoken by two youth in Copenhagen. Speaker A speaks Berber as a first language and speaker B's first language is Kurdish. Nonetheless, their Danish includes elements of Arabic (wallah 'I swear') and Turkish (kız 'girl', para 'money'), and English (I got 'I have', -s plural ending on the Turkish word para).

A: wallah jeg siger min storebror han skylder mig 700 kroner jeg skal have 350 i dag og 350 om to uger. I got paras. Skal du til den der fest på fredag.

"I swear, I’m telling you, my older brother owes me 700 crowns. I am getting 350 today and 350 in two weeks. I have money. Are you going to that party on Friday?"

B: mm..

mm..

A: wallah man jeg siger dig efter den der tur jeg tænker bare på fest og kız.

"I swear, man! I’m telling you after that trip I think only about party and girls"

Other non-standard features are grammatical, such as the simplification of grammatical gender system, and syntactical, such as lack of word order inversion in subordinate clauses ("når man er i puberteten, man tænker mere") and after initial sentence adverb ("normalt man går på ungdomsskolen"); Standard Danish is a V2 language, with an exception for subordinate clauses. Phonetic features include the loss of stød in some words and an isochronic shift from being stress-timed to syllable-timed.

The Danish poet Yahya Hassan made creative use of elements of immigrant Danish in his work.

== See also ==
- Kebabnorsk
- Rinkeby Swedish

== Bibliography ==
- Quist, P. (2012). Skandinavisk i kontakt med indvandrersprog. Sprog i Norden, 43(1).
- Nortier, J., & Dorleijn, M. (2013). Multi-ethnolects: Kebabnorsk, Perkerdansk, Verlan, Kanakensprache, Straattaal, etc. in Bakker, P., & Matras, Y. (Eds.). (2013). Contact languages: a comprehensive guide (Vol. 6). Walter de Gruyter.
- Jørgensen, J. N. (2000). Perkerdansk-lovende perspektiver for det danske sprog. Dansk pædagogisk tidsskrift, (3), 8–15.
- Quist, P. (2006). Perkerdansk og Rinkebysvensk. Kronik i Information 3. marts 2006.
- Cheshire, J., Nortier, J., & Adger, D. (2015). Emerging multiethnolects in Europe.
- Quist, Pia 2008 Sociolinguistic approaches to multiethnolect: Language variety and stylistic practice. International Journal of Bilingualism 12, 1-2: 43–62.
- Quist, Pia and Janus Møller 2003 Research on youth language in Denmark. International Journal of the Sociology of Language 159: 45–55.
- Quist, Pia 2000: Ny københavnsk 'multietnolekt'. Om sprogbrug blandt unge i sprogligt og kulturelt heterogene miljøer. Danske Talesprog. Bind 1. Institut for Dansk Dialektforskning. København: C.A. Reitzels Forlag. 143-212
- Christensen, Mette Vedsgaard 2004: Arabiske ord i dansk hos unge i multietniske områder i Århus. I Dabelsteen & Arnfast (red.): Taler de dansk? Aktuel forskning i dansk som andetsprog. Københavnerstudier i tosprogethed, bind 37. Københavns Universitet.
- Barding, Antonia, Kristina Maria Danielsen Eliasen, Marlene Kjærgaard Bjørn, Anja Falkner Matthiassen, Signe Elvstrøm, and Nathalia Barat. 2015, "Yahya Hassan-ironi og multietnolekt." BA thesis, Roskilde University Center .
