= Maryan =

Maryan may refer to:

- Maryan (film), a 2013 Tamil film
  - Maryan (soundtrack), the soundtrack for the 2013 Tamil film
- Maryan, Bulgaria, a village in Elena Municipality, Veliko Tarnovo Province, Bulgaria
- Maryan, Iran (disambiguation)
- M. Maryan, pseudonym of French novelist (1847-1927)
- Maryan S. Maryan, pseudonym of Israeli-American artist Pinchas Burstein

== See also ==
- Mariya, female given name
- Marian (disambiguation)
- Marjan (disambiguation)
- Maryam (disambiguation)
