= Marian University =

Marian University may refer to:

- Marian University (Indiana)
- Marian University (Wisconsin)

== See also ==
- Marian (disambiguation)
