= Marian College =

Marian College may refer to:

== In Australia ==
- Marian College (Ararat), Victoria, Australia
- Marian College (Sunshine West), Victoria, Australia
- Marian Catholic College (Kenthurst), New South Wales, Australia; see List of schools in Greater Western Sydney

== In Ireland ==
- Marian College (Dublin), Dublin, Ireland

== In New Zealand ==
- Marian College (Christchurch), New Zealand

== In the United States ==
- Marian University (Indiana), United States
- Marian University (Wisconsin), United States
- Marist College, New York, United States, named Marian College from 1946 to 1960

== See also ==
- Marian (disambiguation)
- Marian University (disambiguation)
