= James Kabuye =

- Born: 14 January 1934; Ttanda, Mityana District, Uganda
- Died: 16 September 2026 (aged 92); St. Francis Hospital Nsambya, Kampala, Uganda
- Education: Bukalasa Minor Seminary; Katigondo National Major Seminary; Marian College
- Occupations: Roman Catholic priest; composer; music educator
- Years active: 1962–2026
- Employer: St. Mary's National Seminary Ggaba
- Known for: Catholic liturgical music

James Kabuye (14 January 1934 – 16 September 2026) was a Ugandan Roman Catholic priest, composer and music educator.

== Early life and education ==
Kabuye was born on 14 January 1934 to Yakobo Baziwandiika, a catechist and Pia Alibayagadde, in Ttanda Mityana District, Uganda. He began his education at Naluggi Primary School before joining Bukalasa Minor Seminary. He later studied philosophy and theology at Katigondo National Major Seminary. While at the seminary, he developed an interest in music and began composing religious songs.

From 1986 to 1988, he studied at Marian College in Indianapolis, United States, and also received musical training in Switzerland.

== Career ==
Kabuye was ordained a Roman Catholic priest at Rubaga Cathedral in 1962. In 1964, he participated in preparations for the canonization of the Uganda Martyrs. He worked alongside composer Joseph Kyagambiddwa and was a member of an African choir that performed at St. Peter's Basilica in Vatican City during the canonization celebrations.

After returning to Uganda in 1967, Kabuye was posted to Rubaga Cathedral where he became involved in adapting Catholic liturgical music to Ugandan languages and musical traditions. His work developed during a period when the Catholic Church was increasingly incorporating vernacular languages and local cultural forms into worship following the Second Vatican Council.

Kabuye taught pastoral theology and music at St. Mary's National Seminary Ggaba from 1972 to 1977 and served as parish priest of Nazigo from 1977 to 1978. He later served in Kiyinda-Mityana where he held the positions of Episcopal Vicar for the Mityana Zone and Bishop's Delegate of the Diocese of Kiyinda-Mityana.

He later served at Mubende Minor Seminary as a teacher and vice-rector before becoming rector. He also served as the parish priest of Mirembe Maria Parish.

== Compositions ==
Kabuye composed Catholic liturgical music in Luganda, English, Latin and German. His compositions incorporated elements of Kiganda musical traditions and were performed by Catholic choirs in Uganda. Among his compositions are "Ye Ggwe Katonda Wa Bajjajjaffe, Ye Ggwe Lwazi" which was performed during the visit of Pope John Paul II to Uganda in 1993 at the Namugongo Martyrs Shrine, Alifuga Ensi Yonna, Natendanga Omukama, Tukuwa Mukama, Ayi Mukama Katonda Waffe and Missa Tukwebaza.

In 2015, he composed "You Will Be My Witnesses", one of the songs associated with Pope Francis's visit to Uganda and also composed "Ekinyegenyege" for the occasion. Kabuye's compositions were published in Catholic hymn collections, including Mujje Tutendereze Omukama. He also wrote a book titled Kiganda Music.

== Death ==
Kabuye died on 16 September 2026 at St. Francis Hospital Nsambya in Kampala and his death was announced by the Roman Catholic Diocese of Kiyinda-Mityana where he was residing at the Kiyinda-Mityana Catechetical Centre before his death.

== See also ==
- Joseph Namukangula
