= Black Canadians in the Greater Toronto Area =

Black Canadians as percent of population by census subdivision

Black Canadians make up a sizable group within the Greater Toronto Area (GTA). The majority of Black Canadians are of Caribbean origin, although the population also consists of African American immigrants and their descendants (including Black Nova Scotians), as well as many African immigrants (particularly Somalis, Ethiopians, Ghanaians and Nigerians).

== History ==
Toronto's early Black community settled largely in an area called St. John's Ward, which no longer stands. In the 1850s, the city of Toronto had 1000 Black residents, Oakville had 400, the former city of York had 225, Etobicoke had 80, and Peel Region had 60. Toronto's Black population declined from 1,000 in the 1850s to 500 by the 1870s, due to significant out-migration to the United States. The population remained relatively low until the 1950s when the city's Black population grew to 10,000. Most of the early residents were born in Toronto or other areas in Southwestern Ontario, and could trace their roots to migration from the trans-Atlantic slave trade and the Underground Railroad.

In the 1960s, approximately 40,000 Black people lived in Toronto. Within this population there were over 600 teachers, 500 nurses, and 75 doctors. The population consisted of three main groups: Ontario-born Black Canadians, Caribbean immigrants, and Black Nova Scotians. Black Nova Scotians settled largely in Alexandra Park. Having moved to the city with low levels of education and without many marketable skills, the Nova Scotian group faced high unemployment rates. Earlier waves of Caribbean immigrants came largely from Trinidad and Tobago and Barbados, although Jamaica would later outgrow these two nations as a source country.

In 1967, leaders of the Ontario-born Black Canadians merged their celebration of Emancipation Day with traditions of Trinidad and Tobago Carnival to establish Caribana.

The 1980s and 1990s saw a large influx of East Africans move to the city from Somalia, Ethiopia and Eritrea. More recent black immigrants to the GTA have come largely from West Africa, with Nigeria becoming one of the top sources of immigration to Canada in 2019.

As of 2016, 442,020 Black Canadians resided in Toronto's Census Metropolitan Area, which contains a large portion of the GTA.

In Toronto, many Blacks settled in St. John's Ward, a district which was located in the city's core. Others preferred to live in York Township, on the outskirts of the city. By 1850, there were more than a dozen Black businesses along King Street; the modern-day equivalent is Little Jamaica along Eglinton Avenue, which contains one of the largest concentrations of Black businesses in Canada. First Baptist Church, founded in 1826, is the oldest Black institution currently operating in the city.

Several neighbourhoods in Toronto, including Jane and Finch, Rexdale, Malvern, Weston, St. James Town, and Lawrence Heights are popularly associated with Black Canadians, although all are much more racially diverse than is commonly believed. The Toronto suburbs of Brampton and Ajax also have sizable Black populations, which have migrated outward from Toronto over the past decade. (Ajax has the highest percentage of Blacks of any municipality of 5,000 or more in Canada, with 16%.) The Greater Toronto Area is home to a highly educated middle to upper middle class Black population who continue to migrate out of the city limits, into surrounding suburbs.

There are large variations in the income and poverty levels of different Black sub-groups in the Toronto area. In 2000, among Blacks in the Toronto area, Barbadians had the highest median income at $31,800, while Somalis had the lowest median income at $13,400. At this time, the incidence of low-income among Barbadian families was 10.4%, while it was 72.2% for Somali families. The median income for all Torontonians, regardless of ethnicity, was $29,800 with 13.9% of families considered low-income.

== Culture ==
Media representation of Black people in Canada has increased significantly in recent years, with television series such as Drop the Beat, Lord Have Mercy! and Da Kink in My Hair focusing principally on Black characters and communities.

The films of Clement Virgo, Sudz Sutherland and Charles Officer have been among the most prominent depictions of Black Canadians on the big screen. Notable films have included Sutherland's Love, Sex and Eating the Bones, Officer's Nurse.Fighter.Boy and Virgo's Rude and Love Come Down.

In literature, the most prominent and famous Toronto-based Black Canadian writers have been George Elliott Clarke, Lawrence Hill and Dionne Brand, although numerous emerging writers have gained attention in the 1990s and 2000s.

Since the late 19th century, Black Canadians have made significant contributions to the culture of sports. In North America's four major professional sports leagues, several Black Canadians from the Toronto area have had successful careers, including Jamaal Magloire, Andrew Wiggins, P. K. Subban, and RJ Barrett. In athletics, Ben Johnson and Donovan Bailey were the Toronto area's most prominent Black sprinters in recent decades; the current generation is led by Andre De Grasse.

The largest and most famous cultural event is the Toronto Caribbean Carnival (also known as Caribana), an annual festival of Caribbean Canadian culture which typically attracts at least a million participants each year. The festival incorporates the diversities that exist among the Canadians of African and Caribbean descent.

Black Canadians have had a major influence on Canadian music, helping pioneer many genres including Canadian hip hop, Canadian blues, Canadian jazz, Canadian Afrobeat, R&B, Caribbean music, pop music and classical music. Some The A Toronto sound in rhythm and blues emerged in the 1960s, then a separate Toronto sound in hip hop starting in the 2000s. Black Canadian musicians have enjoyed mainstream worldwide appeal in various genres, such as Dan Hill, Glenn Lewis, Tamia, Deborah Cox, Keshia Chanté, Melanie Fiona, Kardinal Offishall, Drake, The Weeknd, PartyNextDoor, and Tory Lanez.

While African American culture is a significant influence on its Canadian counterpart, many African and Caribbean Canadians reject the suggestion that their own culture is not distinctive. In his first major hit single "BaKardi Slang", rapper Kardinal Offishall (who is of Jamaican heritage) performed a lyric about Toronto's distinctive Black Canadian slang:

We don't say 'you know what I'm sayin', T dot says 'ya dun know'
We don't say 'hey that's the breaks', we say 'yo, a so it go'
We don't say 'you get one chance', We say 'you better rip the show'...
Y'all talking about 'cuttin and hittin skins', We talkin bout 'beat dat face'...
You cats is steady saying 'word', My cats is steady yellin 'zeen'...
So when we singin about the girls we singin about the 'gyal dem'
Y'all talkin about 'say that one more time', We talkin about 'yo, come again'
Y'all talkin about 'that nigga's a punk', We talkin about 'that yout's a fosse'...
A shoe is called a 'crep', A big party is a 'fete'
Ya'll takin about 'watch where you goin!', We talkin about 'mind where you step!'

Because the visibility of distinctively Black Canadian cultural output is still a relatively recent phenomenon, academic, critical and sociological analysis of Black Canadian literature, music, television and film tends to focus on how cultural creators are actively engaging the process of creating a cultural space for themselves which is distinct from both mainstream Canadian culture and African American culture. For example, most of the Black-themed television series which have been produced in Canada to date have been ensemble cast comedy or drama series centred around the creation and/or expansion of a Black-oriented cultural or community institution.

Black activism also has a presence in Toronto; the Black Action Defence Committee was founded in the city in 1988, in response to the killings of several Black men by Toronto Police officers over the previous decade.

== See also ==
- List of black Canadians
- African diaspora
- African-Canadian Heritage Tour
- List of topics related to the African diaspora
- Slavery in Canada
- Demographics of Canada
- Indigenous Black Canadians
- Benjamin, Drew. The Refugee, or the Narratives of Fugitive Slaves in Canada, Related by Themselves, with an Account of the History and Condition of the Colored Population of Upper Canada. 1856.
- Hill, Daniel G (1992), The Freedom-Seekers, Blacks in Early Canada, Stoddart Publishing Co. Limited, ISBN 0-7737-5558-6
