= Expedito Magembe =

- Born: 24 November 1937; Lusozi-Kanabulemu, Nazareth Parish, Diocese of Masaka, Uganda
- Died: 9 May 2025 (aged 87); Nsambya Hospital, Kampala, Uganda
- Citizenship: Ugandan
- Education: St Mary's College Kisubi; St Thomas Aquinas National Major Seminary, Katigondo; St Mary's National Seminary Ggaba
- Occupations: Roman Catholic priest, composer, preacher and exorcist
- Known for: Founder and director of Mount Sion Prayer Centre
- Title: Monsignor
- Parent(s): Kosima Baziwe; Seforoza Nakimera

Expedito Magembe (24 November 1937 – 9 May 2025) was a Ugandan Roman Catholic priest, composer, preacher and exorcist. He was the founder and director of the Mount Sion Prayer Centre in Bukalango, Wakiso District, and served as the chief exorcist of the Archdiocese of Kampala.

== Early life and education ==
Magembe was born on 24 November 1937 in Lusozi-Kanabulemu in Nazareth Parish, in the Diocese of Masaka, to Kosima Baziwe and Seforoza Nakimera. He attended Kiteredde Primary School, where he completed Primary Six in 1957. He then joined the formation house of the Bannakaloori Brothers at Kiteredde, where he trained as a religious brother.

Between 1957 and 1960, Magembe went through the stages of postulancy and novitiate. In 1960, he took the religious vows of poverty, chastity and obedience and became a professed member of the Bannakaloori Brothers.

He later attended St Mary's College Kisubi, where he completed his senior four education. He subsequently studied at Busuubizi Teacher Training College, where he trained as a teacher. He later studied philosophy at St Thomas Aquinas National Major Seminary, Katigondo, in Masaka, beginning in 1968, and studied dogmatic theology at St Mary's National Seminary Ggaba.

== Ordination ==
On 10 December 1972, Magembe was ordained a deacon at Lubaga Cathedral by Cardinal Emmanuel Nsubuga and on 7 December 1973, he was ordained a Roman Catholic priest by Cardinal Emmanuel Nsubuga at Kasaala Catholic Parish Church in Luweero District.

== Teaching career ==
After becoming a professed brother, Magembe's superiors sent him to Busuubizi Teacher Training College for professional training. He completed the course and qualified as a Grade II teacher.

After completing his teacher training, he began working as a primary school teacher at Busuubizi Primary School, which was located near the teacher training college. He later taught at Nandere Primary School in Luweero.

== Music and compositions ==
Magembe became known for his work in Catholic liturgical music and composed hundreds of hymns, many of which were included in the Luganda Catholic hymnal Mujje Tutendereze Omukama.

His songs addressed themes such as Christian vocation, the Virgin Mary, faith, prayer, salvation and the Christian journey. Among the hymns attributed to him are Lugendo lunene, Bw'omwewa Omukama, Tetulabanga, Ggwe nnyaffe, Katonda Eyatutonda, Si Buli Agamba "Mukama", Singa Omukama Teyali Naffe, Kuuma Ebisuubizo, Empeera y'Abagoberera Kristu and Mukama Beera Nange.

== Mount Sion Prayer Centre ==
In 2001, Magembe founded the Mount Sion Prayer Centre in Bukalango, Wakiso District. The centre later became a catholic prayer and pilgrimage site, attracting worshippers for prayer, preaching and deliverance services. He also served as chief exorcist of the Archdiocese of Kampala.

== Monsignor ==
In 2012, Pope Benedict XVI appointed Magembe a monsignor. The title was formally conferred on him in 2013 by Archbishop Cyprian Kizito Lwanga at Rubaga Cathedral.

== Death ==
Magembe died at Nsambya Hospital in Kampala on 9 May 2025, aged 87. His death was confirmed by the Archdiocese of Kampala.

== Honours and legacy ==
In 2024, Magembe received the Cherubim Musical Honour in recognition of his contribution to sacred and Catholic liturgical music. Following his death, some people who had benefited from his support established the Msgr Magembe Foundation in his memory. The foundation became involved in activities commemorating his life and continuing aspects of the charitable work associated with his ministry.

== See also ==
- James Kabuye
- Paolino Tomaino
- John Baptist Odama
- Apolo Kivebulaya
