= Marjan Alirezavandi =

Marjan Qeytul مرجان قيطول
- Village
- Location within Iran
- Coordinates: 34°15′52″N 45°48′18″E
- Country: Iran
- Province: Kermanshah
- County: Gilan-e Gharb
- Bakhsh: Central
- Rural District: Howmeh

Population (2006)
  - Total: 322
- Time zone: UTC+3:30 (IRST)
  - Summer (DST): UTC+4:30 (IRDT)

Marjan Qeytul (Persian: مرجان قيطول, also Romanized as Marjān Qeyṭūl; also known as Marjān and Marjān-e ‘Alīreẕāvandī) is a village in Howmeh Rural District, in the Central District of Gilan-e Gharb County, Kermanshah Province, Iran. At the 2006 census, its population was 322, in 60 families.
