= Toronto slang =

Dialect of English spoken in the Canadian city

Multicultural Toronto English
- Toronto slang / Toronto accent
- Native to: Canada
- Region: Greater Toronto Area
- Ethnicity: Various (see Ethnic groups in Toronto)
- Language family: Indo-European: Germanic; West Germanic; North Sea Germanic; Anglo-Frisian; Anglic; North American English; Canadian English; Multicultural Toronto English
- Early forms: Old English: Middle English; Early Modern English
- Writing system: Latin (English alphabet)
- Sources: Jamaican Patois, Arabic, Canadian English, Somali and African-American Vernacular English

Language codes
- ISO 639-3: –

Multicultural Toronto English (MTE) is a multi-ethnic dialect of Canadian English used primarily in the Greater Toronto Area (GTA), particularly among young non-White (non-Anglo) working-class speakers. First studied in linguistics research of the late 2010s and early 2020s, the dialect is popularly recognized by its phonology and lexicon, commonly known as the Toronto accent and Toronto slang, respectively. It is a byproduct of the city's multiculturalism, generally associated with Millennial and Gen Z populations in ethnically diverse districts of Toronto. It is also spoken outside of the GTA, in cities such as Hamilton, Barrie, and Ottawa.

== History ==
External videos
- 1980s use of MTE
- Home Feeling Struggle For A Community

External videos
- 1990s use of MTE
- Cold Front Record Release Party - Much Music Rap City
- Maestro Fresh Wes interview
- Make Some Noise (1994)
- Ghetto Concept Interview
- Pelham Park Bloods 1
- Pelham Park Bloods 2
- Regent Park Focus on CBC

Linguists trace the origin of Toronto's slang and accent to Jamaican and Somali immigration to Toronto from the 1960s to the 1990s, positing that Toronto's multiethnolect formed as both immigrant groups coalesced into Black Canadian communities. Dialect linguists Laura Baxter and Jacqueline Peters put forward ethnic enclaves such as the Jane and Finch neighbourhood as centres of Black English usage in Toronto; they further argue that the number of loanwords from Jamaican Patois in the dialect demonstrates the linguistic "founder effect" of older and more populous Jamaican communities in these neighbourhoods influencing newer Black immigrants. The development of Toronto slang in Regent Park has been attributed by local journalists to cultural exchange between Jamaican, Somali, Guyanese, and Trinidadian immigrant communities.

Derek Denis, a linguist in the University of Toronto, posits that Somali has an outsized influence on MTE compared to other immigrant languages given the small proportion of Somali speakers in Toronto. He contends that Somali loanwords in MTE originated in Somali immigrant neighbourhoods in Rexdale, and diffused outward into broader Black communities in Toronto, including Jamaican communities. Linguists attribute the development of MTE to societal factors that isolated Black Canadians in Toronto from normative Canadian English, such as the division of Toronto into ethnic enclaves and barriers to socioeconomic mobility for Black Canadians. The popularity of local hip-hop in the GTA, as a counterpoint to the hegemonic influence of hip-hop from the United States, has also been put forward as a vehicle of MTE's diffusion within Black communities.

External videos
- 2000s use of MTE
- Eglinton West 2008 Documentary
- Firewar
- How Can I Be Down
- Beenie Man at Jane and Finch
- Inside Access: Sticky Green
- Lost in the Struggle - CBC Docuseries
- POINT BLANK - Behind the Scenes
- Point Blank in Regent Park - CityTV Docuseries
- YBK TV - NORTHSIDE JANE & FINCH
- EMPz 4 Life 2006 Documentary
- Toronto Murder Epidemic Documentary

The adoption of Toronto slang by non-Black communities in the GTA has been attributed to the influence, consumption, and perceived "coolness" of Black culture in Toronto through hip-hop and social media. Schools have been cited as the first sites where Toronto slang diffused between youth, with proposed mechanisms being frequent face-to-face interaction between peers in a multicultural environment, or exposure to slang terms from social media. In 2000, native Toronto rapper Kardinal Offishall released his Billboard-charting single "BaKardi Slang"; it showcased a variety of the city's slang throughout the lyrics and is considered to have popularized T-dot as a nickname for Toronto.

External videos
- 2010s use of MTE
- Sh*t Toronto People Say
- 6IX RISING Documentary
- Toronto Dictionary Pt 1
- Toronto Dictionary Pt 2
- T-Dot Goon Scrap 2
- Noisey Meets Smoke Dawg
- BizzLoc Interview
- K Money Interview
- WhyG Interview

Drake, who is deemed to have popularized the Toronto rap scene in the late 2000s and much of the 2010s, has been cited as the most "globally-visible and well-known representative" of multicultural Toronto speech. Somali rappers in Toronto such as Robin Banks of Driftwood, Top 5 of Lawrence Heights and Layla Hendryx have found local success by incorporating Toronto slang words of Somali origin into their lyrics. Non-mainstream media played a pivotal role in documenting the use and development of MTE, including the Instagram account 6ixBuzzTV and YouTube videos on Toronto slang. Furthermore, mainstream media outlets such as CP24 have featured and incorporated Toronto slang in their news reporting.

== Phonology ==
As in Standard Canadian English, this dialect features rhoticity, the Low Back Merger Shift, and GOOSE fronting (led by women speakers). Canadian raising also still exists, though possibly less so than among Standard Canadian speakers.

The distinct accent features of Multicultural Toronto English include the TRAP vowel before a nasal consonant being unraised or only slightly raised and the GOAT vowel being monophthongal, both of which are "distinctly non-normative" in 21st-century Standard Canadian English; these are led by men in the Toronto area. Th-stopping is a variable feature, likely adopted from Jamaican Patois, for instance with such words as youth, thing, and them colloquially spelled as yute, ting, and dem.

== Vocabulary ==
Here is a list of common vocabulary in Multicultural Toronto English:

=== Adjectives ===
- "A guy" (used to describe someone who is particularly dangerous or successful, similar to calling someone a "big shot"; not to be confused with "the guy" as both are distinct in their usage)
- "Amped/Gassed" (to be energetic or excited about something)
- "Babyfood" (used to describe something as easy)
- "Bare" (very/a lot/many) [originates from Jamaican Patois]
- "Beat" (something that looks ugly, can be used to describe an object or person)
- "Beg" (someone trying to get attention in a pitiful way, similar to being “extra”) [Often used in a playful manner]
- "Bent" (describes an individual who is upset)
- "Blem" (describes an individual who is high or intoxicated) [originates from Jamaican Patois]
- "Cheesed" (pissed, mad, angry)
- "Certi" (something or someone that is important or of high quality; short for "certified")
- "Dess" (short for desperate, can also describe something as pitiful)
- "Deezed" (describes an individual as muscular and strong)
- "Dutty" (dirty, bad, ugly) [originates from Jamaican Patois]
- "Dry" (uncool, lame, boring, uninteresting)
- "Fried" (describes an individual who is high or intoxicated)
- "Greezy" (something impressive or attractive in a fashionable use)
- "Likkle" (small, little) [originates from Jamaican Patois]
- "Live" (used to describe something as lively or exciting, usually an approval or endorsement of an event's atmosphere)
- "Marved" (hungry, starving)
- "Merked" (ugly, unattractive)
- "Miskeen" (pathetic, or poor - frequently used referring to someone who is "civilian" and "innocent," not involved in any crime) [originates from Arabic]
- "Mod" (crazy, originates from Jamaican Patois)
- "Moshup" (something that is ruined, messed up or botched, commonly used to indicate a situation has gone away) [originates from Jamaican Patois]
- "Neatly" (used to emphasize the quality or manner in which an action will be carried out)
- "Next" (describes something other than what is currently discussed, often emphasizing a disregard or need for an alternative)
- "Namebrand" (something that is important or of high quality, usually used to describe an individual)
- "Peng" (describes a person who is attractive) [originates from Jamaican Patois]
- "Pisst" (describes someone as angry, fired up, or moving with intense energy; distinct from "pissed" through pronunciation and usage)
- "Proper" (describes something as legitimate or done right)
- "Quick times" (for something to be done quickly)
- "Soft" (describes something that is permissible and does not require worry) [originates from Jamaican Patois]
- "Sick" (used to describe someone who is particularly dangerous or gangster)
- "Sweeterman/Sweeter-ting” (an attractive person)
- "Vexxed" (annoyed, upset or irritated) [originates from Jamaican Patois]
- "Wossy" (something crazy or unusual, usually describing the actions of a person) [originates from Jamaican Patois]
- "Waste" (describes something as undesirable or dissatisfying) [originates from Jamaican Patois]

=== Interjections ===
- "Abaay, Abaay" (an expression of surprise, similar to "oh my god") [originates from Somali]
- "Ahlie" (expression to agree with something or "am I lying?") [originates from Jamaican Patois]
- "Are you dumb?" (to describe someone who behaves stupidly and completely idiotically)
- "B" (short for "bro") [originates from Jamaican Patois]
- "Bless up!" (expression of greeting or farewell) [originates from Jamaican Patois]
- "Dun Know/dunno" (replaces "you already know," "of course," or "I know", and also used as a farewell) [originates from Jamaican Patois]
- "Eediat ting" (can refer to an event or action that was stupid or embarrassing to the point of disbelief) [originates from Jamaican Patois]
- "Fend that" (instructing someone to defend themselves, or respond to confrontation)
- "Fiyah/Fire" (used to refer to a homosexual individual or action) [originates from Jamaican Patois]
- "Haye, haye" (an adlib that directly translates to "okay, okay" or "alright, alright") [originates from Somali]
- "Holy!" (pronounced 'holay' and used as an expression of surprise)
- "Say honest?/say word?" (used to rhetorically emphasize honesty, truth or sincerity, similar to "You serious?" or "Really?")
- "Soobax" (directly translates to "come outside" or "lets go") [originates from Somali]
- "Swrong" (short for "what's wrong", typically used in phrases like "swrong with him?")
- "Gwan easy" (telling someone to "take it easy", or "calm down") [originates from Jamaican Patois]
- "Inshallah" ("If God wills it") [originates from Arabic]
- "Jheez" (used to express surprise, excitement or support)
- "Jokes!" ("that's jokes!", compliments something funny or hilarious)
- "Khallas" (signifies that something is finished, completed or done) [originates from Arabic]
- "Mashallah" (used to congratulate someone) [originates from Arabic]
- "Nyeah eh" ("yeah eh?" or "oh really?", used in a hostile tone)
- "More life" (used to wish someone good will, most commonly used to replace "happy birthday") [originates from Jamaican Patois]
- "Nize it/nize that" (to tell someone to shut up or stop talking)
- "Say less/say no more/don't say a word" (used to enthusiastically or supportively agree to a demand, request, or suggestion)
- "Seen/Zeen" (A way of saying “got it” or “understood”) [originates from Jamaican Patois]
- "Top left" (used to emphasize the truth or sincerity of a statement, similar to "I swear" or "I promise")
- "Wagwan" (an equivalent greeting to "what's up" or "what's going on?") [originates from Jamaican Patois]
- "Wallahi" ("I swear to God") [originates from Arabic]
- "Warya" (used to address a man directly, or get his attention) [originates from Somali]
- "What're you sayin?" ("what you up to?" used as an expression of greeting) [originates from Jamaican Patois]
- "Y-pree" (used to tell someone to mind their own business or asking them what they're up to) [originates from Jamaican Patois]

=== Pronouns ===
- "Mans" or sometimes "man-dem" (I/me/you/people; first-person singular is the most notable usage) [originates from Jamaican Patois]
  - Mans in 21st-century Toronto English has gained special attention in being applied as a variety of personal pronouns, including (most notably) as a first-person singular pronoun (like I or me), a second-person singular pronoun (like you), or an indefinite pronoun (similar to people or folks). A plural-conjugated verb is required with the use of mans; for example: "Mans are ready" can mean "I am ready", "you are ready", or "we are ready". "What are mans saying?" can mean "What am I saying?", "What are you saying?", or "What are we saying?". The similar usage of man as a pronoun is common in Multicultural London English (MLE), but mans as a singular pronoun is exclusively Torontonian; the two terms likely developed in parallel timeframes, but not with one dialect directly affecting the other. It is likely that both usages ultimately come from man with a Jamaican Patois or other Caribbean Creole origin, though no Creole uses mans in this exact way. The process of this pronoun emerging from the original noun, man(s), has been happening in Toronto since roughly 2005 to the present.
- "Them/dem-mans/man-dem" (them)
- "Us mans" (we)
- "You mans" (you, plural)
- "Fam" (Friend, or more broadly anyone considered 'family' in a communal sense; can be used in place of 'we' or 'us') [originates from Jamaican Patois]

=== Nouns ===
- "6ix" (Toronto, in reference to its six districts and both its area codes containing the number "6")
- "Abti/upti" (uncle) [originates from Somali]
- "Akhi" (directly translates to brother, but refers to one's close friend) [originates from Arabic]
- "Batty man" (a derogatory term used to refer to a homosexual individual) [originates from Jamaican Patois]
- "Beak" (a mouth, usually in reference to someone's loose lip)
- "Bid" (a gun, originates from the word "biir" which roughly translates to "steel") [originates from Somali]
- "Bin" (jail or Prison)
- "Bill" (a hundred dollars)
- "Boydem/Bwoydem" (refers to government or police) [originates from Jamaican Patois]
- "Bone/Bones" (a dollar/dollars)
- "Bucktee/bean" (someone who is an addict, homeless, or acts as such) [originates from Somali]
- "Bangout" (a large fight or brawl, usually one with an audience)
- "Canteen" (referring to jail or prison)
- "Chrome" (a gun or firearm)
- "Chune" (refers to a song or music) [originates from Jamaican Patois]
- "Cotch/on cotch" (to have something ready or prepared)
- "Crib" (someone's place of residence)
- "Cro/crodie" (crip version of 'bro/brodie' but usually refers to a friend, popularized among non-gang-affiliated individuals through local rap music)
- "Cronem" (group of "cros", crip version of "bronem", and refers to a group of friends)
- "Cyattie" (describes a female who is being loud and obnoxious) [originates from Jamaican Patois]
- "Cut" (to exit, get away from or leave) [originates from Jamaican Patois]
- "Cuzzo" (cousin)
- "Deafazz" (giving a hard physical slap or a punch to someone)
- "Dhillo" (a derogatory term used to refer to a promiscuous woman) [originates from Somali]
- "Dime piece" (an attractive woman)
- "DT" (abbreviation for downtown)
- "Dukes" (parents)
- "Duppy" (a ghost or spirit) [originates from Jamaican Patois]
- "Ends" (area, or neighbourhood) [originates from Jamaican Patois]
- "Fam" (short for "family" but generally used to refer to a "friend") [originates from Jamaican Patois]
- "Fenty" (short for fentanyl)
- "Fuckery" (bullshit) [originates from Jamaican Patois]
- "Gazza" (drama, gossip, conflict or theatrics) [originates from Jamaican Patois]
- "Geedo" (weed, marijuana, or cannabis) [originates from Somali]
- "Gerber" (A baby, with comparable connotation to the American slang "lil bro")
- "Govy" (abbreviated for someone's government name, legal name, or personal information)
- "Goof" (A foolish person, with a much stronger negative connotation than the dictionary definition)
- "Grains" (bullets)
- "Gyal" (girl) [originates from Jamaican Patois]
- "Gyallis" (a guy who can pick up ladies easily, or has a reputation for pursuing several women at a time) [originates from Jamaican Patois]
- "Gyaldem" (group of girls) [originates from Jamaican Patois]
- "Habbad/Haabid" (a gun or weapon) [originates from Somali]
- "Headtop" (a person's head, but can metaphorically represent mental state) [originates from Jamaican Patois]
- "Hoodman" (a young working-class person involved in crime and drugs, similar to the equivalent word "roadman" used in MLE)
- "Hooyo" (mom or mother) [originates from Somali]
- "Housey" (to be on house arrest)
- "Jake" (a police officer)
- "Jam" (a party or a function)
- "Khaniis" (a derogatory term used to refer to a homosexual individual) [originates from Somali]
- "Loud" (marijuana)
- "Machine" (firearm)
- "Mandem" (a group of males or male friends) [originates from Jamaican Patois]
- "Mission" (a challenging or tedious journey, typically involving a large distance)
- "Miyute" or "myyute" (a person who is childlike, insignificant, and not taken seriously) [originates from Jamaican Patois]
- "Mixup" (drama, gossip, conflict or theatrics) [originates from Jamaican Patois]
- "OT" (abbreviation for out of town)
- "Pokes" (synonymous with vagina)
- "Pollies" (slang for "politics", used in reference to street politics)
- "Range" (Used to reference a specific wing in jail or Prison)
- "Shorty" (girl)
- "Side ting" (sexual partner other than a girlfriend/wife)
- "Snake" (an untrustworthy person)
- "T-Dot" (abbreviation word for "Toronto")
- "Telly" (a hotel or a hotel room)
- "Ting" (a thing but usually refers to an attractive female) [originates from Jamaican Patois]
- "Unto" (originates from the word "cunto" which roughly translates to "food" which is slang for drugs) [originates from Somali]
- "Wasteman" (a worthless, garbage, insensible idiotic person who makes bad decisions with their life, both words being used interchangeably) [originates from Jamaican Patois]
- "Wasteyute" (used similarly to wasteman, but more specifically describes a childlike or naive individual) [originates from Jamaican Patois]
- "Wifey" (girlfriend, or wife)
- "Wozzles" (oral sex)
- "Yute" (synonymous with "youth", but used to directly address or refer to a young person) [originates from Jamaican Patois]

=== Verbs ===
- "Ball up" (smoking marijuana)
- "Bagged" (having acquired a significant other or sexual partner)
- "Buss" (to give/to send, to break, tired)
- "Chop" (to sell drugs)
- "Crunched/crushed" (to beat up or attack)
- "Cut" (to leave)
- "Duppied" (to turn to a ghost, usually referring to someone passing away or having been killed) [originates from Jamaican Patois]
- "Fawad" (to come or to go somewhere) [originates from Jamaican Patois]
- "Fend" (to defend against)
- "Flip" (to kill someone, usually to claim bounty or reward; derived from flipping)
- "Flied/Flyed" (someone being killed, in reference to funeral release doves)
- "Greased" (to describe having sexual intercourse, used similarly to "Pine")
- "Gurksed/murked" (to beat up or attack)
- "Jam" (to rob or steal from someone)
- "Kawal" (to scam, synonymous with finesse) [originates from Somali]
- "Keep Six" (to be on the lookout or to watch your back; derived from the layout of a clock)
- "Latched" (to be arrested or detained by law enforcement)
- "Link" (to meet up)
- "Lowe" (to allow, ignore, forget or not bother with) [originates from Jamaican Patois]
- "Moving" (describes someones behaviour, actions, or attitude)
- "Nyam" (to eat) [originates from Jamaican Patois]
- "Pree" (to see, look or pay close attention to) [originates from Jamaican Patois]
- "Pine" (to have sexual intercourse)
- "Rate" (to express approval or appreciation for something or someone)
- "Run" (to give something or to hand an item over, with "run me my..." being the common usage)
- "Reach/fly" (synonyms for "come by" or "attend", used similarly to "fawad")
- "Rinse" (to rob or steal from someone)
- "Send" (to hand over or pass an object)
- "Scoop" (to get a ride somewhere, get picked up)
- "Scrap" (to fight)
- "Slime" (to play, or act like a player, using others for sexual pleasure)
- "Stain" (to rob or steal from someone)
- "Toke/tump" (the action of smoking, often referring to marijuana)
- "Touch" (to go to, arrive at, or attend a place; e.g. "touch road") [originates from Jamaican Patois]
- "Wop" (to sell or deal drugs)
- "Yellowtape" (indicates that something or someone is completed or finished, in reference to crime scene tape)

=== Intensifiers ===
- "-azz" (a suffix used to amplify or emphasize the meaning of a word)
  - I heard his new track, its a hardazz.
- "-dem" (a pluralizing element that can emphasize the size of a group or relationships between members of said group) [originates from Jamaican Patois]
  - Tell the rest of the dawgsdem to come through.
- "one-two" (a pluralizing element that emphasizes quantity of an action, object, task, etc)
  - I already tried to call him one-two times, it goes straight to voicemail.

=== Discourse markers ===
- "More times" (“usually; more often than not,” used as a sentence adverb to preface generalizations) [originates from Jamaican Patois]
  - I like Eaton, but more times I'm at Yorkdale.
- "Styll" (pronounced “still”; means “I agree / that’s true,” typically at the end of a statement)
  - Nah, I'm done for the night, styll.
- "Two-twos" (used to preface a statement presented as true, often surprisingly so)

== Social perception ==
Stigma surrounds the usage of MTE, typically contrasting it to the prestige dialect of Standard Canadian English; MTE is cast as an inferior form of English exclusively spoken by residents of Toronto with low intelligence or poor education. Linguists Derek Denis and Vidhya Elango recorded local arguments that posited MTE as "inauthentic" compared to its Somali and Jamaican Patois origins, and linked the stigma around MTE to racial ideologies in North America, which attach linguistic features associated with Black masculinity to racial stereotypes of personality and social status.

There have been controversies regarding the development of MTE. Addressing the similarities between MTE and Multicultural London English, Canadian linguists have rejected the theory that MTE is descended from MLE, positing instead that shared immigration patterns are responsible. They argue that the historical presence of the Jamaican diaspora serves as a common point of origin for the pronominal use of "mans" and other linguistic features found in both MLE and MTE. Furthermore, social commentators have identified public attitudes that attribute the origin of MTE to celebrities such as Drake or PartyNextDoor. Bee Quammie, a Global News Radio host, criticized this perception, writing that Toronto's vernacular "was well represented by hip-hop artists like Michie Mee, Kardinal Offishall, Choclair, Dream Warriors, and many others" before Drake.

Cultural commentators have put forward the decontextualized usage of MTE as an example of cultural appropriation by non-Black residents of Toronto, comparing the appropriation of MTE to the commodification of African-American Vernacular English in hip-hop. In response to Lilly Singh's video on MTE in Vanity Fair and an article on MTE in The Globe and Mail, groups on Twitter criticized how MTE was described in mass media, stating that the coverage dissociated the dialect from its Black origins. Linguist Ryan Persadie, in a critical analysis of Drake's identification with MTE, states that Drake's non-attributive usage of MTE in his music uproots the language from its Caribbean origins. Bee Quammie defends Drake's linguistic strategy, positing that Drake uses MTE to embody and represent his local culture on a highly visible public platform.

== In popular culture ==
- From 2016 to 2019, Toronto-based comedy group 4YE in collaboration with Bell Media released a multi-part series featuring "Tyco" and "Judge Tyco," caricatures of the stereotypical Toronto mans, set in the early 2000s.
- In 2017, Drake was featured in a Toronto-based comedy skit "T-Dot Goon Scrap DVD 2" produced by 4YE, in which he satirizes Toronto's slang and accent. In 2025 and 2026, Judge Tyco was a main character in a special for the Canadian television comedy series The Office Movers.
- In a Vanity Fair YouTube video, Shawn Mendes, a popular Canadian singer and songwriter, was featured teaching the audience Canadian slang (primarily featuring Toronto slang vocabulary).
- In 2024, during his viral rap feud with Toronto-based rapper Drake, Kendrick Lamar parodied MTE on his diss track, "Euphoria."
- In 2024, Drake released a satirical parody-remix of Hey There Delilah titled "Wah Gwan Delilah" alongside local comedian Snowd4y; the song pokes fun at MTE and Toronto culture.

== See also ==
- Singlish
- Sociolect
