= Marjan Gomar =

Marjan Gomar مرجان گمار
- Village
- Location within Iran
- Coordinates: 34°14′01″N 45°49′47″E
- Country: Iran
- Province: Kermanshah
- County: Gilan-e Gharb
- Bakhsh: Central
- Rural District: Howmeh

Population (2006)
  - Total: 280
- Time zone: UTC+3:30 (IRST)
  - Summer (DST): UTC+4:30 (IRDT)

Marjan Gomar (Persian: مرجان گمار, also Romanized as Marjān Gomār and Marjān-e Gomār; also known as Gomār) is a village in Howmeh Rural District, in the Central District of Gilan-e Gharb County, Kermanshah Province, Iran. At the 2006 census, its population was 280, in 54 families.
