= Gastarbeiterdeutsch =

Pidgin language spoken in Germany

Gastarbeiterdeutsch (German: [ˈɡastʔaʁbaɪ̯tɐˌdɔɪ̯t͡ʃ]; literally "guest worker German") is a pidgin spoken in Germany which draws its vocabulary from the German language. The grammatical structure is simplified German but is also influenced by the structure of other component languages, for example Turkish one of the input languages.

Emerging in the 1960s, Gastarbeiterdeutsch was mainly spoken by the first generation of foreign workers from Southern Europe and North Africa, and later Turkey, who immigrated to Germany. They were called ‘Gastarbeiter’ (guest workers). Guest workers were to be a transitory workforce with short-term working agreements to meet the demand of the growing German economy. The integration of foreign workers was not planned. Following changes in immigration policies in the 1990s and in 2000, Germany now recognizes immigrants, including guest workers, as permanent residents and allows dual citizenship.

Similarly to other pidgins, Gastarbeiterdeutsch is stigmatized and is connected to the stereotyping of immigrants.

Gastarbeiterdeutsch is a workforce pidgin used by newcomers to communicate with their employers and German workers. Gastarbeiterdeutsch shows the typical attributes of a pidgin: the superstrate language is German, it lacks complexity, the grammatical structure is simplified, and morphological inflection is reduced while regularity is increased.

Here is an example of Gastarbeiterdeutsch disregarding the variety of sentence structure common in German simplifying it to SVO. In the following sentence the speaker applies the SVO (subject/verb/object) structure, instead of the correct SOV (subject/object/verb) structure, and the article in front of the noun is missing.

Gastarbeiterdeutsch: ‘Wenn Sie (subject) [missing article] brauchen (verb) Werkzeug (object), dann…’.

German: ‘Wenn Sie (subject) ein Werkzeug(object) brauchen(verb), dann…’.

English: ‘If you need [a] tool, then …’.

The use of Gastarbeiterdeutsch is limited to the first generation of immigrants as subsequent generations of immigrants attended the German public school systems, grew up bilingual, and learned their parent's mother tongue(s) as well as German. They are therefore usually fluent in German.

== Türkendeutsch ==
Türkendeutsch is an alteration of the superstrate German language where Turkish sounds and lexical features are mixed into the grammatical structure of German. Some Turks belonging to the second or third generation of ‘Gastarbeiter’ continue to deliberately mix Turkish and German. Here an example: ’Thomas ı şimdi bi vergessen et fuer ne zeitlang‘ = The sentence structure is German, in this case SVO, but the lexicon is mixed; the words in italic belong to the Turkish lexicon while the words in non-italic belong to the German lexicon. In English: ’Well, just forget Thomas for a while’.

This mixed language is only used in private settings to express the speaker's connection to both cultures.
