= Apolo Kivebulaya =

Ugandan priest

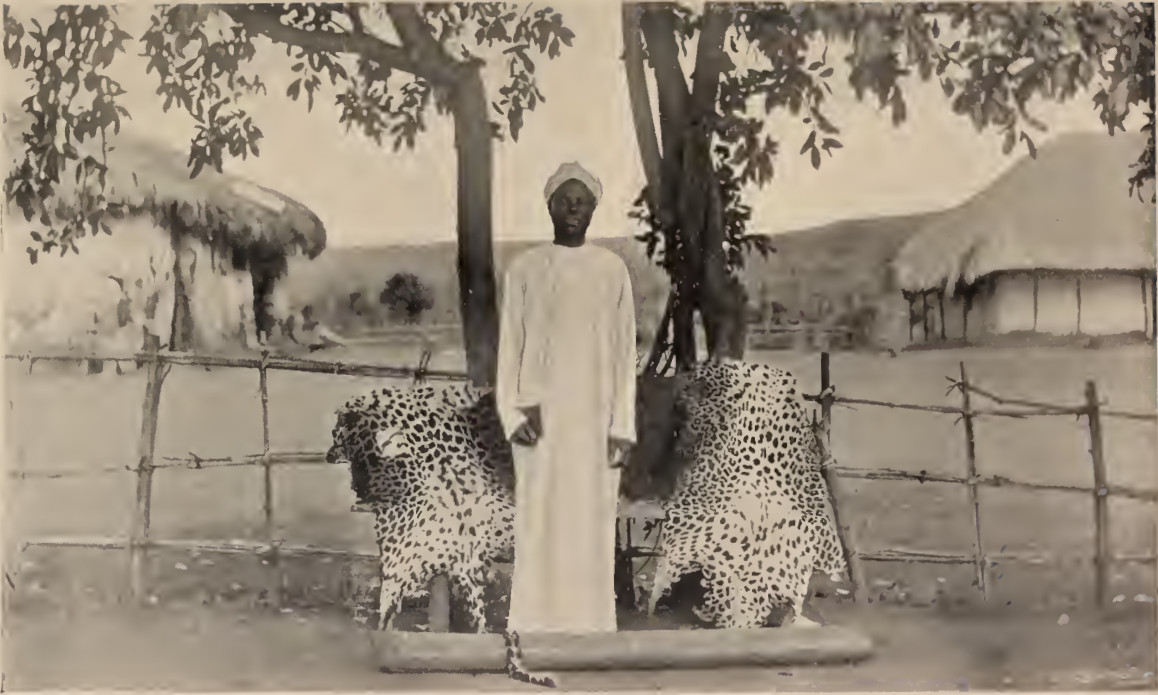
The Rev. Apolo Kivebulaya (c. 1864 - 30 May 1933)

Apolo Kivebulaya (c. 1864 - 30 May 1933) was a Ugandan Anglican priest and evangelist. He is sometimes referred to as the "apostle to the pygmies" for his work among the Bambuti people of the Ituri forest in eastern Congo. Apolo is considered the principal pioneer of the Anglican church in the Belgian Congo.

== Biography ==
He was born, along with a twin brother, in 1864 in Kiwanda, Uganda. His parents originally named him Waswa Munubi. Waswa grew up the son of peasants who apprenticed him to a witch doctor, but when he discovered the man tricking people out of their possessions, he left him to learn about Islam, which had been recently brought to the court of the Kabaka of Buganda, Muteesa, by Arab traders.

When Waswa turned 13, Henry Morton Stanley, who had discovered David Livingstone in 1872, paid a visit to Mutesa's court and persuaded the chief to begin "reading" in the Christian religion. The chief was probably more impressed with Stanley's guns than with his Bible, for Mutesa had already parted ways with the Arabs and now needed protection. But the chief's welcome opened the door for his people to embrace Christianity.

Stanley's expedition opened the way for other missionaries too, notably Alexander Murdoch Mackay, who arrived in 1878. Waswa credits MacKay with planting seeds of belief in his life. "When I looked at the European," he wrote, "his eyes sparkled with kindness." Mackay organized a church, and members of the chief's court began attending his classes.

He took the name Apolo at his baptism in 1895 after the Apollos of the Bible. He was given the name "Kivebulaya," meaning "from Europe," because he always wore a suit under his cassock.

Apolo is remembered in the Church of England with a commemoration on 30 May.

== Missionary Work ==
Apolo began his ministry by focusing on church planting. Under the leadership of the Church Missionary Society, he worked in the foothills of north-western Uganda. His evangelistic efforts led to numerous conversions and the establishment of many new congregations. Apolo accepted the call to evangelize tribes in the Belgian-controlled area that is now the Democratic Republic of the Congo. He traveled west, crossing the Rwenzori Mountains in winter. He recorded his apprehension about the prospect, stating: "I stood and looked far away to the Congo. The prospect terrified me." Despite this, he proceeded.

In this new cultural context, Apolo's preaching resulted in conversions. However, his insistence on a changed lifestyle alongside conversion encountered resistance. This led to a chief expelling him, and Apolo was escorted back to prison in Uganda. During his imprisonment, Apolo reported experiencing a vision in which Jesus appeared to him, instructing him to "Take heart, for I am with you." Apolo was subsequently released, but Belgian colonial authorities had closed the border. For the next twenty years, he remained in Uganda, continuing his work as a church planter. During this period, he traveled extensively on foot (he was known to not wear shoes) and by bicycle. He preached, focusing on Jesus and the cross, and instructed converts on consistent living according to their new faith. He encouraged the translation of the Bible into local languages and addressed social issues such as education and the care of infants and deserted women.

In 1903, Apolo was ordained a priest in the Anglican Church. He often acted as an intermediary between European missionaries and African congregations. In 1915, Apolo returned to Congo and began rebuilding the church he had previously established there. He continued his evangelistic efforts, and within a few years, he commenced missionary work among the Pygmy tribes of the deep forest. Despite cultural and linguistic differences, he established a network of small congregations across multiple tribes.

== See also ==
- Cyril Stuart
- Alfred Tucker
- John Willis (bishop)
- Expedito Magembe
