= Marian, Fars =

Marian ماريان
- Village
- Location within Iran
- Coordinates: 28°41′16″N 54°33′27″E
- Country: Iran
- Province: Fars
- County: Darab
- Bakhsh: Central
- Rural District: Hashivar

Population (2006)
  - Total: 1,091
- Time zone: UTC+3:30 (IRST)
  - Summer (DST): UTC+4:30 (IRDT)

Marian (Persian: ماريان, also Romanized as Mārīān and Māreyān) is a village in Hashivar Rural District, in the Central District of Darab County, Fars province, Iran. At the 2006 census, its population was 1,091, in 243 families.
