= Murjan, Fars =

Murjan مورجان
- Village
- Location within Iran
- Coordinates: 29°09′59″N 52°11′06″E
- Country: Iran
- Province: Fars
- County: Firuzabad
- Bakhsh: Meymand
- Rural District: Dadenjan

Population (2006)
  - Total: 323
- Time zone: UTC+3:30 (IRST)
  - Summer (DST): UTC+4:30 (IRDT)

Murjan (Persian: مورجان, also Romanized as Mūrjān; also known as Marjān, Morghūn, Murghun, and Musghūn) is a village in Dadenjan Rural District, Meymand District, Firuzabad County, Fars province, Iran. At the 2006 census, its population was 323, in 78 families.
