= Ethnolect =

Lect associated with a certain ethnic or cultural subgroup

An ethnolect is generally defined as a language variety that marks speakers as members of ethnic groups who originally used another language or distinctive variety. According to another definition, an ethnolect is any speech variety (language, dialect, subdialect) associated with a specific ethnic group. It may be a distinguishing mark of social identity, both within the group and for outsiders. The term combines the concepts of an ethnic group and dialect.

The term was first used to describe the monolingual English of descendants of European immigrants in Buffalo, New York. The term ethnolect in North American sociolinguistics has traditionally been used to describe the English of ethnic immigrant groups from non-English speaking locales. Linguistically, the ethnolect is marked by substrate influence from the immigrant language, a result of the transition from bilingualism to English monolingualism.

== Overview ==
The idea of an ethnolect relates to linguistic variation and to ethnic identity. According to Joshua Fishman, a sociologist of language, the processes of language standardization and nationalism in modern societies make links between language and ethnicity salient to users.

Ethnicity can affect linguistic variation in ways that reflect a social dimension of language usage. The way in which ethnic groups interact with one another shapes their usage of language. Ethnolects are characterized by salient features that distinguish them as different from the standard variety of the language spoken by native speakers of the particular language. These features can either be related to the ethnolect's lexical, syntactic, phonetic or prosodic features. Such linguistic difference may be important as social markers for a particular ethnic group.

== Types of ethnolects ==
Ethnolect varieties can be further subdivided into two types. One type is characteristic of a specific group, where a majority language currently used by speakers is influenced in terms of lexicon, grammar, phonology and prosody by a minority language associated with their ethnic group but is no longer in active use. Examples include Jewish American English, previous German Australian English and African American Vernacular English.

The other type, is called a multiethnolect, because several minority groups use it collectively to express their minority status and/or as a reaction to that status to upgrade it. In some cases, members of the dominant (ethnic) group, especially young people, share it with the ethnic minorities in a 'language crossing' situation to express a new kind of group identity. Examples include Kiezdeutsch, Multicultural London English and Singapore English.

== Purpose ==
=== Establishing identities ===
Using ethnolects allow speakers to define their social position, and helps them construct their identity. Subscribing to language features commonly associated with a particular ethnic group works to either affiliate or distance themselves from a particular ethnic group.

Establishing an ethnic identity through language is not necessarily singular. Studies have found speakers who have melded linguistic features of separate communities together in order to create a mixed ethnic identity. African Americans in rural western North Carolina have been found to adopt both local pronunciation and AAVE vocabulary in their speech. Second-generation Italian Canadians in Toronto have been recorded to participate in a vowel shift that resembles both Italian and Canadian pronunciations.

=== Facilitating communication ===
Ethnolects can also serve a communicative purpose in the intergenerational context. Common in new migrant families of non-English language background, ethnolects can be used by the younger generation to communicate with their elders. This usage of ethnolects may be concurrent or in replacement of the community language. Speakers have been found to believe that the use the ethnolect eases communication with the older generations.

The use of ethnolect may also address bilingual communication in the home, where there is a discontinuity in the language that parents and their children use. Children whose first languages are different may pick up terms from their parents' ethnolect. The two varieties in this case can symbolize a speaker's multiple identity.

== Examples ==
Listed below are a few examples of ethnolects, with several linguistic features they display highlighted. These distinguished linguistic features are present in areas such as phonetics, grammar, syntax and lexicon. They are usually brought about by influence of another language - the mother tongue of its speakers.

=== Chicano English (Mexican ethnolect) ===
Chicano English, or Mexican-American English, refers to the ethnolect spoken primarily by Mexican Americans. Chicano English developed as a result of immigration into the United States in the 20th century. Some features of Chicano English include:

- Lexical
  - Borrowing: Anglicised Spanish words

Your mother is planching.
Planching has been anglicised from the Spanish word planchando 'ironing'.

- Prosodic
  - Prosody that is similar to the syllable-timed Spanish

- Phonological
  - Vowel contraction: Chicano English is more monophthongal than American English, especially in monosyllabic words.

=== African American Vernacular English (African-American ethnolect) ===
African American Vernacular English (AAVE) is one of the most researched and salient ethnic varieties of English. It generally refers to the ethnolect primarily spoken by working or middle-class African-Americans in more informal conversations. Some prevalent features of AAVE include:

- Phonological
  - The de-voicing of word-final consonants /b/, /d/, /g/

cub may sound identical to cup

- Metathesis in lexical items

aks for ask
graps for grasp

- Syntactical
  - An optional tense system that differs from the tense-marking system in English

He been done workin 'he finished work a long time ago'
He done been workin 'until recently, he worked over a long period of time'

- Negative concord, also known as double negative or "double negation"

I didn't go nowhere 'I didn't go anywhere'
If the sentence is negative, all negatable forms are negated.

=== Greek Australian English (Greek ethnolect) ===
Greek Australian English refers to the English spoken by Greek immigrants in Australia. It is known and used by the Greek Australians during the last 170 years of settlement. Some salient features of Greek Australian English include:

- Phonological

- Vowel changes

- /ə/ advanced to [ε] in closed syllables, e.g. houses
- The diphthong in face has an open starting point, [e:i] e.g. day.
- Near has an open finish [ia] or with glide insertion, [ija], e.g. here.
- The final nucleus in comma is consistently open [back a], e.g. soccer, longer.

- Consonant changes

- Heavy aspiration of /k/, e.g. cold, soccer.
- Perceptual voicing of voiceless stops and fricatives

- /t/ in together, /t/ in Tuesday
- intervocalic /p/ in properly
- /s/ in baseball

- Frequency of /t/ tapping is higher than in comparable speakers from other backgrounds

- Syntactic

This is limited to in-group communication, especially with parents.
- Ellipsis

- Auxiliary deletion, for example:

How you know?

- Preposition deletion, for example:

We'll go movies.

- Quantifier deletion (some), for example:

Can I have money?

== Further manifestations ==
Ethnolects are typically employed by speakers to either decrease or increase social distance with others. Listed below are more atypical manifestations of using ethnolects in order to achieve certain social purposes.

=== Crossing ===
Crossing refers to the use of a language, or aspects of it, by speakers who are not accepted by members of the group associated with the language. In reference to ethnolects, crossing refers to speakers using ethnolects that do not formally belong to them. Considering the inherent connection between ethnolect and ethnicity, crossing is highly contentious as it involves a movement across ethnic boundaries. Speakers are required to negotiate their identity to perform crossing. Beyond being a linguistic phenomenon, crossing has social implications, and community members are generally aware of the sanctions against crossing.

=== Hypercorrection ===
Ethnolects may also be rejected by its speakers. This linguistic choice is apparent in ethnic hypercorrection. Ethnic hypercorrection is a subclass of linguistic hypercorrection, and refers to the over-application of certain linguistic markers common in the variety of another group. Speakers belonging to an ethnicity, often a minority group, hypercorrect to draw distance between themselves and their ethnic groups. Often, speakers hypercorrect due to the social prestige associated with the different language varieties. For example, second and third generation Italian and Jewish immigrants in New York were found to have stronger vowel sounds that are distinctive of the New York accent in their speech. (link 19) The vowels they spoke were opposite of what was expected from their Italian and Yiddish ethnicity.

== Criticism of the "ethnolect" approach ==
Some twenty-first century linguists object to broader application of the term ethnolect to describe linguistic differences that are believed to reflect ethnic group affiliation. According to these scholars, this may inaccurately posit ethnicity as the central explanation for linguistic difference, when in fact there may be other variables which are more influential to an individual's speech.

Some scholars also point out that the common use of ethnolect is used to compare the "ethnolects" of ethnic minorities with the "standard" speech of ethnic majorities, which is designated as the regional dialect instead of as a majority ethnolect. The ethnolinguistic repertoire approach is therefore proposed as a more effective model in linguistic research that could counteract the problems of the ethnolect approach as listed below.

=== Intra-group variation ===
The way one speaks can vary widely within any ethnic group on a continuum of styles that could be mixed across variants. Some may employ a few or none of the features in an ethnolect while others may use many. Therefore, it is difficult to draw the line between speakers and non-speakers of an ethnolect. Although qualifications and modifiers are established in definitions to enhance the fluidity of the concept, it is still unable to fully resolve the problem as variation exists in complex and intricate patterns that are unlikely to be fully accounted for in brief definitions.

=== Intra-speaker variation ===
Speakers of ethnolects tend to be aware of the differences in their speech compared to others to some extent. They may therefore temper their usage of salient features in their ethnolects when speaking to interlocutors who are not part of their ethnic group and may also be able to code-switch fluently between their ethnolectal variety and Standard English. Speakers who do that are considered to be "bidialectal". Yet, the selective use of elements from an ethnolect is not predictable, which then confounds the notion of code-switching.

=== Out-group use ===
Some speakers who are not part of a particular ethnic group may also make use of elements of the group's ethnolect, which can include behaviours like crossing or passing when people imitate an ethnic stereotype or assimilate to an ethnic group's behaviour to be included. This can be observed in phenomena such as "crossing" in multi-ethnic interactions. For example, elements of AAVE are used by people who have little association with African Americans because of the language's influence in hip-hop. Non-group members may also extensively employ features from an ethnic group's repertoire in their speech if they spend much of their time with the group members.

=== Delineating the ethnic group ===
It is difficult to define the ethnic group a person belongs to, especially in Western societies where ethnic groups are porous and fluid. Individuals often shift from one ethnic identity to another as they transition between life stages. Ethnic group membership is constructed not just on the basis of descent but also on the basis of symbolic practices, including language. Viewing ethnic identity as an inheritance that cannot be changed may pose problems. In addition, an increasing number of individuals consider themselves as part of two or more ethnic groups. It is thus difficult to define one's ethnicity by their parentage or physical features. Ethnic identification also generally involves self-identification of a shared understanding and belonging with culture or language, as well as affirmation from existing members of the existing ethnic group. The factors that determine ethnic identity are ambiguous.

=== Delineating the term ethnolect ===
The final problem lies in the conceptualisation of a given group's language as a separate ethnic variety like AAVE and Chicano English, or merely as ethnic variation from an abstract norm such as the phonological variation among people of a shared ethnicity. In the ethnolect approach, distinctions are drawn to categorize certain languages spoken as ethnolects (i.e. ethnic varieties) while others are considered as a repertoire of linguistic features associated with the ethnic group that are employed in ethnic variation.

== See also ==
- Sociolinguistics
- Sociolect
- Accent (sociolinguistics)
- Diglossia
- Multiethnolect
- National language
- Idiolect
- Creole language
