= Marian Apartments (Lafayette, Indiana) =

- U.S. National Register of Historic Places
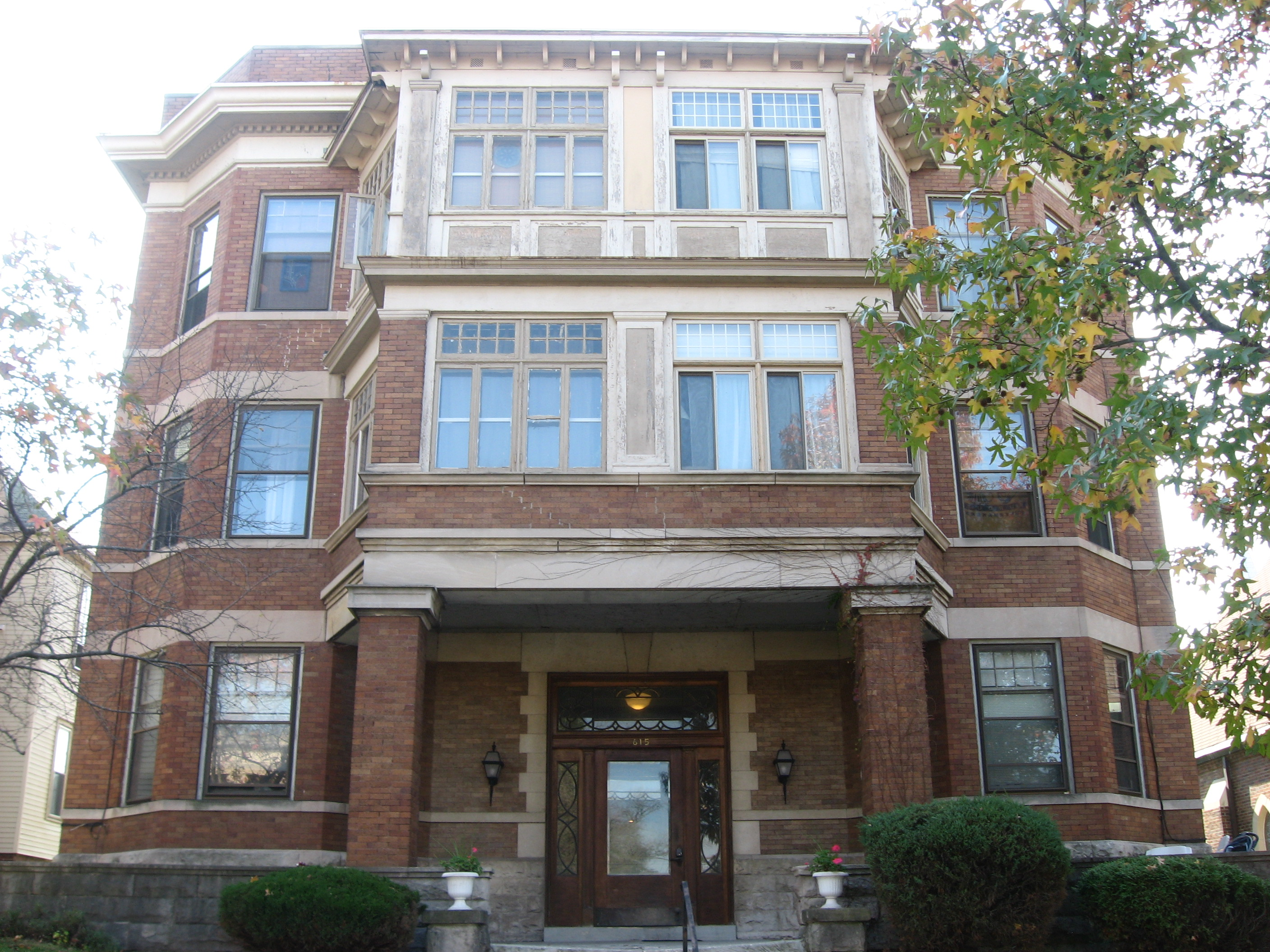
- Marian Apartments in 2009

- Location within Tippecanoe County, Indiana Location within Indiana Location within the United States
- Location: 615 North St., Lafayette, Indiana
- Coordinates: 40°25′15″N 86°53′23″W
- Area: less than one acre
- Built: 1907
- Architect: Oliver W. Pierce, Jr.
- NRHP reference No.: 83000150
- Added to NRHP: June 30, 1983

The Marian Apartments, also known as Marian Flats, is a historic apartment building located at Lafayette, Indiana. It was designed by Oliver W. Pierce, Jr. and built in 1907. It is a three-story, rectangular, brick building with limestone and wood trim. It features polygonal three-story projecting bays.

They were listed on the National Register of Historic Places in 1983.
