= Marjaneh Bakhtiari =

Swedish author (born 1980)

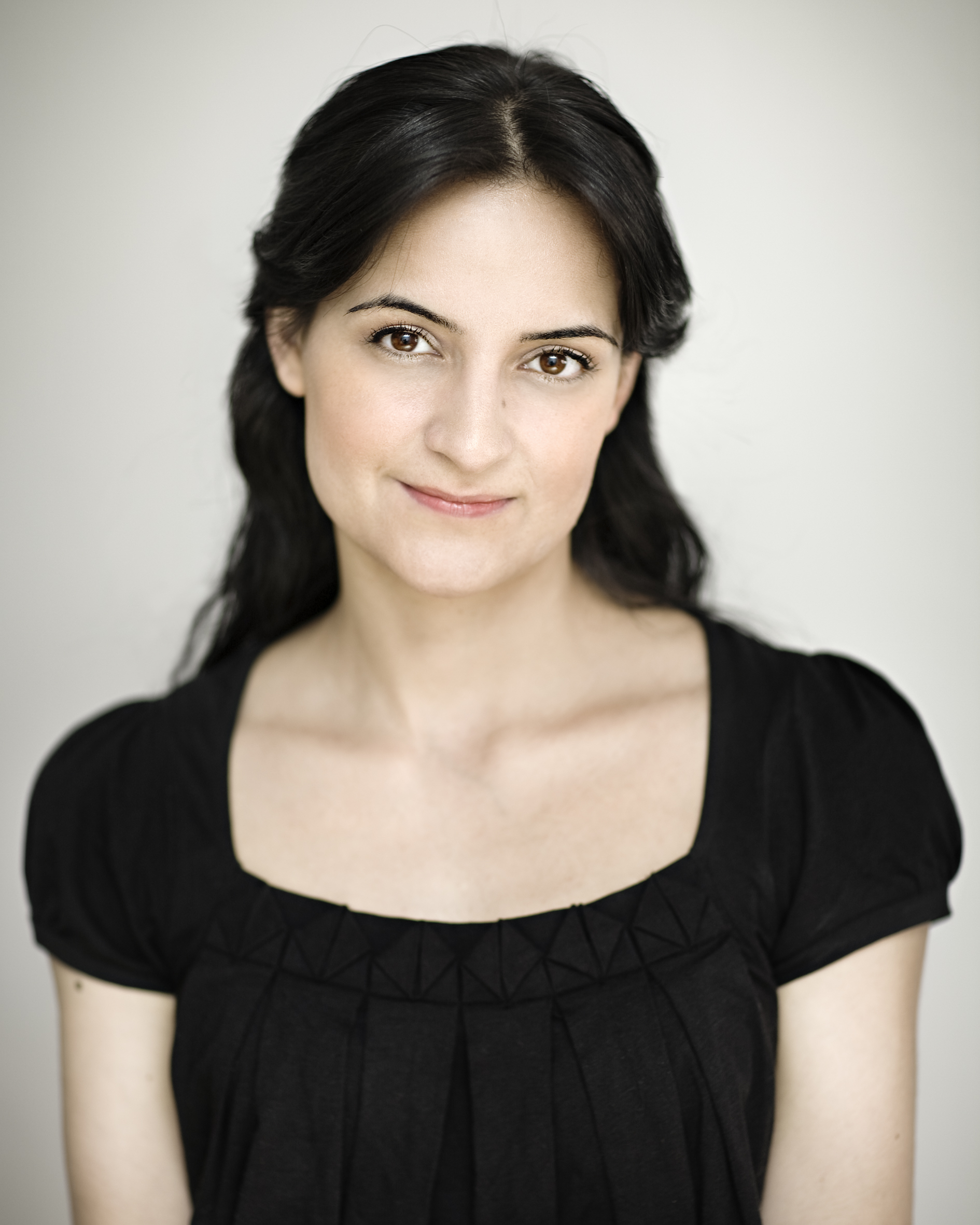
- Born: 23 March 1979 (age 47); Teheran, Iran

Marjaneh Bakhtiari (born 21 March 1980) is a Swedish author. She was born in Iran, but moved to Sweden with her parents when she was seven years old.

Her debut book Kalla det vad fan du vill was published in 2005.

== Bibliography ==
- 2005 – Kalla det vad fan du vill. Stockholm: Ordfront. Libris 9717994. ISBN 9170370826
- 2008 – Kan du säga schibbolet?. Stockholm: Ordfront. Libris 10735651. ISBN 9789170372872
- 2013 – Godnattsagor för barn som dricker. Stockholm: Ordfront. Libris 13585959. ISBN 9789170374951
- 2016 – Farväl till dem på land. Stockholm: Novellix. Libris 19534841. ISBN 9789175891552
- 2016 – Salongen. Stockholm: Sveriges Radio. Libris 088jp73px2z8j8rc
- 2017 – Ballongen. Stockholm: Sveriges Radio. Libris jstdnq0jggq8t81m
- 2017 – Godnattsagor för barn som dricker. Stockholm: Ordfront förlag. Libris 20023609. ISBN 9789174418910
- 2018 – Födelsedagen. Johanneshov: LL-förlaget. Libris mwp4xpn3k29c55q0. ISBN 9789188073730
- 2022 – Oändligt underbart. Stockholm: Ordfront. ISBN 9789177752127
