= Multicultural London English =

Sociolect of English in the United Kingdom

- Urban British English
- Native to: England
- Region: Multicultural parts of London; variants in other cities
- Ethnicity: Various (see Ethnic groups in London)
- Language family: Indo-European: Germanic; West Germanic; North Sea Germanic; Anglo-Frisian; Anglic; English; British English; Multicultural London English
- Early forms: Proto-Indo-European: Proto-Germanic; Old English; Middle English; Early Modern English
- Writing system: Latin (English alphabet)
- Sources: Various, including Caribbean English (in particular Jamaican Patois), African dialects of English, Punjabi, Urdu, Bengali, Hindi, Arabic, Somali and Cockney

Language codes
- ISO 639-3: –
- Glottolog: None

Multicultural London English (abbreviated MLE) is a sociolect of English that emerged in the late 20th century. It is spoken mainly by working-class people—or middle-class people mimicking working-class people—in multicultural parts of London.

Speakers of MLE come from a wide variety of ethnic and cultural backgrounds, and live in diverse neighbourhoods. As a result, it can be regarded as a multiethnolect. One study was unable "to isolate distinct (discrete) ethnic styles" in their data on phonetics and quotatives in Hackney and commented that the "differences between ethnicities, where they exist, are quantitative in nature". Linguists have suggested that diversity of friendship groups is a contributing factor to the development of MLE: the more ethnically diverse an adolescent's friendship networks are, the more likely it is that they will speak MLE.

Variants of MLE have emerged in diverse neighbourhoods of other cities in England, such as Birmingham and Manchester, which fuse elements of MLE with local influences. This has led to some linguists referring to an overarching variety of English known as Multicultural British English (MBE), also known as Multicultural Urban British English (MUBE) or Urban British English (UBE), which emerged from and is heavily influenced by MLE. With the worldwide growth of grime and UK drill from the mid-2010s onwards, elements of MLE began to spread internationally, with some words from MLE being used in Australian, Canadian, Dutch, and Irish English.

== History ==
MLE is rooted mostly in the widespread migration from the Caribbean to the UK following World War II, and to a lesser extent the migration from other areas such as South Asia and West Africa. Distinctive Black British English did not become widely visible until the 1970s. The popularity of Jamaican music in the UK, such as reggae and ska, led to the formation of a new dialect rooted in Jamaican patois being used in the UK, setting the foundation for what would later become known as MLE.

Research conducted in the early 1980s concluded that adolescents of Afro-Caribbean descent were "bidialectal", switching between Jamaican creole and London English; while white working class adolescents would occasionally use creole-inspired words, they retained their accents. In 1985, Smiley Culture, a British musician of Jamaican and Guyanese heritage, released "Cockney Translation", one of the first examples of British "white english" and British "black english" appearing side-by-side on a record (however, still distinct from each other). While Smiley Culture was commenting on how the two forms of language were very distinct from each other and lived side-by-side, more natural fusions would become common in later years. Some hip-hop artists from the late 1980s and early 1990s, such as London Posse, regularly infused both Cockney and patois influenced english in their music, showcasing how elements of both were becoming very much entwined and influencing each other, reflecting how younger, working-class Londoners were speaking. Such influences were not restricted to persons of a specific racial background. In 1987, Dick Hebdige, a British sociologist, commented that "In some parts of Britain, West Indian patois has become the public language of inner-city youths, irrespective of their racial origin".

By the late 1990s, London was becoming increasingly multilingual, and residential segregation was less common. Young people from various ethnic backgrounds intermixed and, in Hackney at least, Cockney was no longer the majority-spoken local dialect, resulting in children of various ethnic backgrounds adopting MLE. Linguist Tony Thorne noted that white working-class school kids were using "recreolised lexis". In the following decade, it would become ever more common, showcased prominently in music such as grime and British hip hop, and in films like Kidulthood.

As the media became more aware of MLE in the 2000s, a variety of names emerged to describe it such as "Nang slang", "Blinglish", "Tikkiny", or "Blockney". MLE is sometimes referred to as "Jafaican" (or "Jafaikan"), conveying the idea of "fake Jamaican", because of popular belief that it stems solely from immigrants of Jamaican and Caribbean descent. However, research suggests that the roots of MLE are more varied: two Economic and Social Research Council-funded research projects found that MLE has most likely developed as a result of language contact and group second language acquisition. Specifically, it can contain elements from "learners' varieties of English, Englishes from the Indian subcontinent and Africa, Caribbean creoles and Englishes along with their indigenised London versions, local London and south-eastern vernacular varieties of English, local and international youth slang, as well as more levelled and standard-like varieties from various sources."

According to research conducted at Lancaster University and Queen Mary University of London in 2010, "In much of the East End of London the Cockney dialect... will have disappeared within another generation.... it will be gone [from the East End] within 30 years.... It has been 'transplanted' to... Essex and Hertfordshire New towns."

Variants of MLE have emerged in diverse neighbourhoods of other cities in England, such as Birmingham and Manchester, which fuse elements of MLE with local influences. This has led to some linguists referring to an overarching variety of English known as Multicultural British English (MBE), also known as Multicultural Urban British English (MUBE) or Urban British English (UBE), which emerged from and is heavily influenced by MLE. The dropping of "urban" from the name is in part due to the spread of MBE beyond urban areas, but mainly due to the negative connotation of the word in its use as a euphemism for black or African American.

With the worldwide growth of grime and UK drill from the mid-2010s onwards, elements of MLE began to spread internationally along with the genres. Some Australian, Canadian, Dutch, and Irish musicians, such as Onefour, Drake, and 73 De Pijp, for example, have been noted for using words derivatives of MLE. Kate Burridge and Howard Manns, both Australian linguists, also noted that some MLE words (such as 'peng', meaning attractive or good) were being used generally by Australian youth. Similar influences have also been noted in Finnish teenagers. It has been noted that in other countries, such as Canada, Multicultural Toronto English has developed very strong similarities compared to MLE, which arose independently but with similar cultural influences and origin roots. A Canadian linguist, Derek Denis, has been noting MTE for some of the MLE phrases (such as "mans", meaning a group of guys, "wasteman", meaning someone's a waste of space or a loser, and "yute", a word of Jamaican origin for "youth", used to refer to a young adult or child), which were commonly used by Torontonian youths.

== Grammar ==
- Was/were variation: The past tense of the verb "to be" is regularised. Regularisation of was/were is something that is found across the English-speaking world. Many non-standard systems in Britain (and parts of the US Mid-Atlantic coast) use was variably for positive conjugations, and weren't for negative conjugations (system 1 below) to make the distinction between positive and negative contexts clearer (cf. will/won't and are/ain't). Most non-Standard varieties in the English-speaking world have a system where both positive and negative contexts have levelled to was (system 2 below). Speakers of MLE use any of the three systems, with choice correlating with ethnicity and gender. Cheshire and Fox (2008) found the use of non-standard was to be most common among Black Caribbean speakers, and least common among those of Bangladeshi descent. Bangladeshis were also found to use non-standard weren't the least, but this variable was used more by white British speakers than anyone else.

Standard English	Non-standard system 1	Non-standard system 2
I was, I wasn't	I was, I weren't	I was, I wasn't
You were, you weren't	You was, you weren't	You was, you wasn't
He/she/it was, he/she/it wasn't	He/she/it was, he/she/it weren't	He/she/it was, he/she/it wasn't
We were, we weren't	We was, we weren't	We was, we wasn't

- An innovative feature is the ability to form questions in "Why ... for?" compared to Standard English "Why ...?" or "What ... for?".
- The "traditional Southern" England phrasal preposition "off of" has "robust use", especially with "Anglo females".
- Man as a pronoun: 'Man' is widely used as a first person singular pronoun, which may be rendered "man's" when combined with certain verbs such as "to be" and "to have": "man got arrested", "man's getting emotional". "Man" can also be used to refer to the second-person or third-person singular: "Where's man going?" (Where are you/is he going?)

=== Discourse-pragmatic markers ===
==== Innit ====
Innit/init, a reduction of "isn't it", has a third discourse function in MLE, in addition to the widespread usage as a tag-question or a follow-up as in [1] and [2] below. In MLE, innit can also mark information structure overtly, to mark a topic or to foreground new information, as in the italicised example in [3].

1. they was getting jealous though innit
2. Hadiya: it weren't like it was an accident
  Bisa: innit
3. yeah I know. I'm a lot smaller than all of them man and who were like "whoa". I mean the sister innit she's about five times bigger than you innit Mark?

==== This is ====
This is as a quotative, to introduce direct reported speech at key points in dramatic narrative.

1. this is my mum's boyfriend "put that in your pocket now".

==== Still ====
Still has been observed to take on a new role as a sentence-final particle in MLE, related to its function in standard English as a discourse marker. The word is used as a modal particle, whereby it mediates epistemic modality, expressing both intersubjectivity and politeness.

1. Sue: and you’ve got brothers have you?
  Robert: yeah yeah. One of them died though still

As a sentence-final particle, it can be used both in isolation, or collocated with though as seen above.

== Phonology ==
While older speakers in London today display a vowel and consonant system that matches previously dominant accents such as Cockney, young speakers often display different qualities. The qualities are on the whole not the levelled ones noted in recent studies (such as Williams & Kerswill 1999 and Przedlacka 2002) of teenage speakers in South East England outside London: Milton Keynes, Reading, Luton, Essex, Slough and Ashford. From principles of levelling, it would be expected that younger speakers would show precisely the levelled qualities, with further developments reflecting the innovatory status of London as well as the passage of time. However, evidence, such as Cheshire et al. (2011) and Cheshire et al. (2013), contradicts that expectation.

=== Vowels ===
- Fronting of /ʊ/: the vowel in FOOT is "more front [...] in the outer-city borough of Havering than in Hackney"
- Lack of /oʊ/-fronting: fronting of the offset of /oʊ/ "absent in most inner-London speakers" of both sexes and all ethnicities but "present in outer-city girls".
- /aɪ/-lowering across region: it is seen as a reversal of the diphthong shift. However, the added fronting is greater in London than in the southeastern periphery, resulting in variants such as [aɪ] and monophthongised [aː]. Fronting and monophthongisation of /aɪ/ are correlated with ethnicity and strongest among Black, Asian, and minority ethnic (BAME) speakers. It seems to be a geographically directional and diachronically gradual process. The change (from approximately [ɔɪ]) involves lowering of the onset, and as such, it is a reversal of the diphthong shift. It can be interpreted as a London innovation with diffusion to the periphery.
- Raised onset of the vowel in words like FACE, which results in variants such as [eɪ]. Like /aɪ/, monophthongisation of /eɪ/ to [eː] is strongest among BAME. It is also seen as a reversal of the diphthong shift.
- /aʊ/ realised as [aː] and not "levelled" [aʊ]: In inner-city London, [aː] is the norm for /aʊ/. Additionally, [ɑʊ] is used by some BAME, especially girls, in the inner city.
- Advanced fronting of /uː/ results in realisations such as [ʏː]
- Backing of /æ/ can result in variants such as [a̠].
- Backing of /ʌ/ results in variants such as [ɑ] or [ʌ], rather than [ɐ].

=== Consonants ===
- Reversal of H-dropping: word-initial /h/ was commonly dropped in traditional Cockney in words like hair and hand. That is now much less common, with some MLE speakers not dropping /h/ at all.
- Backing of /k/ to [q]: /k/ is pronounced further back in the vocal tract and is realised as [q] when it occurs before non-high back vowels, such as in words like cousin and come.
- Th-fronting: /θ/ is fronted to [f] in words such as three and through (which become [fɹiː] and [fɹuː]), and /ð/ is fronted to [v] in words such as brother and another, which become bruver and anuver.
- Th-stopping: Syllable-initial voiceless "th" can be stopped (i.e., pronounced as "t"), so thing becomes ting. Syllable-initial voiced "th" can be stopped, i.e., pronounced as "d" (this, that and though, would be pronounced dis, dat/dah and doe respectively).
- Among speakers of Jamaican descent, London t-glottalization may additionally apply to [t] resulting from stopped /θ/, for example both of them [boʊʔ ə dɛm]. Hypercorrections like [fʊθ] for foot may also be heard among Jamaicans.
- Advanced articulation of the sibilants /s, z/: the sibilants /s, z/ are often realised as the post-dentals [s̪, z̪].
- Like most accents of England, Multicultural London English is non-rhotic.

== Vocabulary ==
Examples of vocabulary common in Multicultural London English include:

=== Adjectives ===
- "Bait" (obvious, or well known)
- "Balling" (rich)
- "Bare" (very/a lot/many)
- "Booky/Bookey/Bookie/Buki" (suspicious, strange)
- "Buff" (strong/attractive) (can be used in conjunction with "ting" meaning an attractive situation, or more commonly, an attractive woman)
- "Butters" (ugly, or disgusting)
- "Dead/bad" (boring, empty)
- "Deep" (very unfortunate/serious) (used to describe a situation)
- "Dutty" (dirty, bad, ugly)
- "Gassed" (overwhelmed, happy, excited, full of oneself)
- "Greezy" (bad)
- "Gully" (rough, cool)
- "Hench" (physically fit, strong)
- "Leng" (attractive, gun, something good)
- "Long" (laborious, tedious)
- "Moist" (soft / uncool, more extreme form of 'wet')
- "Peak" /piːk/ (a situation or thing that is awful, undesirable, disappointing, or embarrassing)
- "Peng" (attractive person, or something good)
- "Piff" (attractive person, something good)
- "Safe" (greetings, good)
- "Shook" (scared)
- "Wavey" (high or drunk)
- "Wet" (uncool, boring, soft)

=== Interjections ===
- "Dun know" ("of course" or "you already know", also an expression of approval. An abbreviated form of "You done know" as in "You done know how it goes".)
- "Alie/Ahlie!" ("Am I lying?", used as an expression of agreement, or as a question marker as in "Ahlie you sit there?")
- "Oh, my days!" /oʊ mɑː deɪz/ (a generalised exclamation, previously common in the 1940s and 1950s)
- "Safe" /seɪf/ (expression of approval, greeting, thanks, agreement, and also used as a parting phrase)
- "Rah!" /rɑː/ (exclamation, used to express bad, excitement, shocking, unbelievable, wow)
- "Big man ting" ("seriously", used after making a statement)
- "On a G ting" (almost the same as the above but less common and, unlike the above, used almost exclusively before making a statement)
- "Swear down!" ("swear it", "really?")
- "Wagwan" (What's going on?)

=== Pronouns ===
- "Man" (first or second-person singular)
- "You" (second-person singular)
- "My man" (third-person singular, masculine)
- "My guy" (close friend or acquaintance)
- "My G" (short for "my guy")
- "Them man" (they)
- "These man" (they)
- "Us man" (we)
- "You man" (you, plural)
- "You(s) lot" (you, plural)

=== Nouns ===
- "Akh" (a term of endearment, derived from the Arabic word for brother)
- "Blem" (a cigarette)
- "Blud" (an endearing term for a close friend; from "blood" implying family)
- "Boss(man)" (used to refer to an individual, often a service worker in a convenience store or chicken shop)
- "Bruv" (an endearing term used for a close friend or brother)
- "Boy" [bwɔːɛ] (a term of belittlement, to belittle someone)
- "Creps" (shoes, more typically trainers or sneakers)
- "Cuz" (short for "cousin"; can be used for anyone who is a friend or in family)
- "Ends" (neighbourhood)
- "Dinger" (car, often in a criminal context, referring to a stolen vehicle)
- "Fam" (short for "family", can also refer to "friend")
- "Feds" (police)
- "Gally" (girl(s))
- "Garms" (clothes, derived from garments)
- "Gyal" [ɡjæl] (girl)
- "Gyaldem" [ɡjældɛm] (group of girls)
- "Mandem" (group of men, male friends)
- "Paigon" (a modified spelling of English word "pagan", to refer to a fake friend/enemy)
- "Rambo" (knife)
- "Riddim" (instrumental/beat of a song)
- "Roadman" (a youth member that spends a lot of time on the streets and may sell and use drugs, or cause trouble)
- "Shank" (to stab, knife)
- "Side ting" (sexual partner other than a girlfriend/wife, as in the standard British phrase "a bit on the side")
- "Skeng" (gun, knife)
- "Sket" (a promiscuous woman)
- "Ting" (a thing or a situation, also an attractive woman)
- "Wasteman" (a worthless/useless person)
- "Upsuh" (out of town)
- "Wap" (gun)
- "Wifey" (girlfriend or wife)
- "Yard" (house or dwelling)

=== Verbs ===
- "Air" (to ignore somebody)
- "Allow (it/that)" (to urge someone else to exercise self-restraint)
- "Bang (out)" (to punch, to do a lot)
- "Beef" (argument, fight)
- "Beg" (please, a wannabe/try-hard)
- "Bun" (to smoke, to kill someone)
- "Buss" (to give/to send, to bust, or to ejaculate)
- "Chat breeze" (talk rubbish/lie)
- "Cheff" (stab, from a chef cutting with a knife)
- "Ching" (stab)
- "Chirpse" (to flirt with somebody)
- "Clap" (to punch/shoot/rob)
- "Cotch" (to hang out)
- "Crease" (to laugh hysterically)
- "Dash" (to throw)
- "Duss" [dʌs] (to make a run for it)
- "Gas" (to lie)
- "Jack" (to steal something)
- "Kweff" (to stab)
- "Link (up)" (to meet up, give someone something, pre-relationship status)
- "Lips" (to kiss, specifically on the mouth)
- "Merk" (to beat someone, finish someone off)
- "Packed (off)" (killed)
- "Par (off)" (to verbally abuse someone, or to make a mockery of someone)
- "Pattern" (to fix something/yourself up/get something/get something done)
- "Pree" (to stare at something or someone)
- "Set (me some/that)" (to ask for an item)
- "Shoobz" (to party)
- "Stain" (to rob)/
- "Touch yard" (to have reached home)
- "Twos" (to share something with somebody)

== In popular culture ==
- In The Real McCoy, one of the earliest seen forms of the language is widespread throughout this series.
- The Bhangra Muffin characters from Goodness Gracious Me use an early form of Multicultural London English.
- Characters of all ethnicities in the Channel 4 series PhoneShop use Multicultural London English continually.
- Characters in the film Kidulthood and its sequel Adulthood also use the dialect, as well as the parody film Anuvahood and its sequel Sumotherhood.
- The satirical character Ali G created by Sacha Baron Cohen parodies the speech patterns of Multicultural London English for comic effect.
- The gang protagonists of the film Attack the Block speak Multicultural London English.
- Several characters in the sitcom People Just Do Nothing speak Multicultural London English.
- Lauren Cooper (and her friends Lisa and Ryan) from The Catherine Tate Show often use Multicultural London English vocabulary.
- In the feature film Kingsman: The Secret Service, the protagonist Gary "Eggsy" Unwin uses MLE, but his mother and stepfather use regular Cockney.
- Lisa, the police officer in Little Miss Jocelyn, speaks Multicultural London English and interprets speech for colleagues.
- Armstrong & Miller has a series of World War II sketches with two RAF pilots who juxtapose the dialect's vocabulary and grammar with a 1940s RP accent for comedic effect.
- A BBC article about Adele mentioned her as being a speaker of Multicultural London English.
- The Chicken Connoisseur (Elijah Quashie), a YouTube user who rates the quality of takeaways selling chicken and chips, frequently uses Multicultural London English vocabulary.
- The TV show Chewing Gum uses Multicultural London English throughout.
- The song "Man's Not Hot" by comedian Michael Dapaah under the pseudonym Big Shaq, which satirises UK drill music, utilises MLE.
- Many of the characters in the show Top Boy use Multicultural London English.
- The Spider-Man: Across the Spider-Verse adaptation of Hobie Brown / Spider-Punk uses MLE heavily throughout the film. The character's voice actor, Daniel Kaluuya, is from London.
- In the Netflix series Supacell, many of the characters speak Multicultural London English.
- The TV series Man Like Mobeen prominently features Multicultural British English which incorporates influences from the local Birmingham dialect and accent, as well as Urdu.

== See also ==
- Cockney
- Estuary English
- Koiné language
- Multiethnolect
- African American Vernacular English
