= Edward Baxter =

Edward Baxter may refer to:

- Edward Felix Baxter (1885–1916), British Army soldier and recipient of the Victoria Cross
- Edward John Baxter (1853–1939), English medical missionary
