= Muteesa =

Muteesa (variably spelled Mutesa or Mutessa) may refer to:

- Muteesa I of Buganda, the 30th Kabaka of Buganda who reigned between 1856 and 1884.
- Muteesa II of Buganda, the 36th Kabaka of Buganda who reigned between 1939 and 1969. He also was the first President of Independent Uganda:1962 to 1966.
