= William Lytle Schurz =

American historian on Latin America

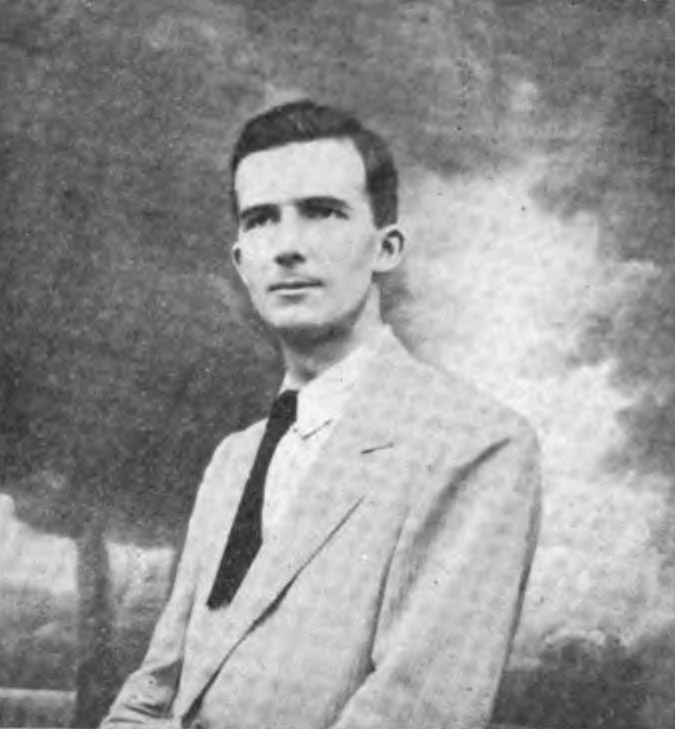
- Schurz c. 1916
- Occupation: Historian

Academic background
- Education: Ph.D., 1915
- Alma mater: University of California, Berkeley

Academic work
- Sub-discipline: Latin America specialist
- Institutions: American Institute for Foreign Trade

William Lytle Schurz (November 25, 1886 – July 26, 1962) was an American academic, government official, and businessperson who specialized in the history of Spanish conquests including Latin America. He was known for his research on the Manila galleon trade network.

== Early life ==
Schurz was born in South Lebanon, Ohio, on November 25, 1886. He attended the University of California, Berkeley and graduated with a Ph.D. in 1915. Studying under Herbert Eugene Bolton, he consulted the General Archive of the Indies in Seville for his research.

== Career ==
He taught Latin American history at the University of Michigan from 1915 to 1918 before he became an adviser to Edward M. House and started a career in public service.

Under the aegis of the United States Department of Commerce, Schurz served as commercial attaché to the U.S. embassy in Brazil from 1920 to 1926. He served on a 1923 commission to explore the possibility of U.S. rubber production and unsuccessfully lobbied Harvey S. Firestone of the eponymous tire company to invest in South America. The Ford Motor Company created the Fordlândia plantation as a result of these efforts.

He later advised the Republic of Cuba, worked with U.S. export companies, and returned to public service before joining the American Institute for Foreign Trade from 1946 until his death. Now the Thunderbird School of Global Management at Arizona State University, Schurz served as its president for a time and was fondly remembered. He died in Glendale, Arizona, on July 26, 1962.

== Scholarship ==
Schurz's 1939 book, The Manila Galleon, was the first study of trade links between Acapulco and Manila during the Spanish colonial era. It received high praise in The New York Times on publication and remains a foundational work.

He coined the term The Spanish Lake in 1922 to describe Spain's sixteenth-century dominance of the Pacific Ocean. Oskar Spate adopted this term for his three-volume work on the region, and the language continued to be interrogated within Pacific historiography into the 2020s.

In 1954, he published This New World: The Civilization of Latin America based on his courses at the American Institute for Foreign Trade.

Writing in The Hispanic American Historical Review, John A. Crow noted that Schurz had once traveled 25,000 miles along the Amazon Basin and had spent years training other specialists. In Crow's estimation, "Mr. Schurz rightly deserves the title of 'Dean of Latin Americanists'."

His 1961 Brazil: The Infinite Country again drew on extensive firsthand experience and background knowledge to educate Americans on what was still an understudied subject.

== Writings ==
=== Books ===
- The Manila Galleon
- This New World
