= Egyptian invasion of southern Somalia =

- Part of Egyptian expansion in East Africa
Date	October 1875 – January 1876
Location	Barawa and Kismayo, southern Somalia
Result	Egyptian military victory; Barawa and Kismayo occupied, Egyptian withdrawal in 1876

Belligerents
Khedivate of Egypt	Sultanate of Zanzibar; Somali forces allied with or serving the Zanzibar administration

Commanders and leaders
Henry McKillop Pasha; Charles Chaillé-Long	Hamed bin Abdulla (Kismayo); Local Zanzibar officials

Strength
About 350 troops deployed at Kismayo; larger expedition initially about 1,300	Several hundred Somali irregulars at Kismayo; Zanzibar garrisons at Barawa and Kismayo

Casualties and losses
Unknown	Unknown

The ‘’‘Egyptian expedition to the Somali coast of 1875’’’ was a military and naval operation organised by the Khedivate of Egypt under Khedive Isma’il Pasha. Led by McKillop Pasha, the expedition aimed to establish an Egyptian presence on the East African coast and secure an outlet to the Indian Ocean. It occupied Barawa and Kismayo, bringing Egypt into a dispute with the Sultanate of Zanzibar over territorial claims along the coast.

== Background ==
During the 1870s, Khedive Isma’il sought to expand Egyptian influence in East Africa. His government was interested in connecting its territories in the interior of the continent with the Indian Ocean, partly to improve communications and promote commerce. The Egyptian expansion in Somalia formed part of this wider strategy.

== Expedition ==
On 17 September 1875, Isma’il Pasha instructed General Charles George Gordon that a naval expedition should be sent to the mouth of the Jubba under McKillop Pasha. Long Bey (Miralai Chaille Long) was appointed commander of the land forces, while the overall operation was placed under Gordon’s authority.

In October 1875, Egyptian forces extended their occupation to the southern Somali coast, including the ports of Barawa and Kismayo. The intervention disrupted local trade and raised concerns among British officials in Zanzibar about Egyptian influence along the coast.

In October 1875, Egyptian forces extended their occupation to the southern Somali coast, including the ports of Barawa and Kismayo. The intervention disrupted local trade and raised concerns among British officials in Zanzibar about Egyptian influence along the coast.

== Capture of Barawa ==
In October 1875. The town was then under the authority of the Sultan of Zanzibar, whose coastal possessions Egypt sought to challenge.

The Egyptian expedition secured control of Barawa and the city surrendered without resistance.

Following the surrender, the Egyptians established a detachment in Barawa under an Egyptian commandant. Two Tunni chiefs from the town also offered to accompany McKillop's expedition towards Kismayo, where they would act as intermediaries between the Egyptian troops and the local population. The capture of Barawa thus provided the expedition with an important coastal foothold before its advance further south.

== Capture of Kismayo ==
The Egyptian expedition captured Kismayo on 16 October 1875. The town was claimed by Zanzibar, whose garrison was overpowered by the Egyptian force.

Kismayo already possessed a small fort near the mouth of the Jubba River. An Arab governor had been appointed there in 1870 and had constructed the fort by November 1874. This earlier fortification became a position occupied by the Egyptian expedition during its capture of the town.

== Withdrawal ==
Following diplomatic protests from Britain, McKillop was ordered to withdraw the Egyptian force from the Indian Ocean coast. Kismayo had been evacuated by on 22 January 1876. The expedition consequently failed to establish a permanent Egyptian base at the mouth of the Jubba.
