= Enayat Ahmad =

Indian geographer

- London, 1946
- Born: Enayat Ahmad; 1 August 1923; Harpur, Bihar, India
- Died: 10 December 1999 (aged 76); Ranchi, Jharkhand, India
- Education: Aligarh Muslim University; London School of Economics
- Occupation: Professor of Geography
- Known for: 'Ahmad's Theory' of the evolution of Himalayan drainage systems; Indian coastal geomorphology
- Notable work: Geography of the Himalayas, 1992; Geomorphology, 1985; Coastal Geomorphology of India, 1972.
- Relatives: Grand daughter Sameen Husain, Darakhshan Husain
- Awards: Bhoogol Ratna Award, 2016

Enayat Ahmad (1 August 1923 – 10 December 1999) was an Indian geographer known for his contribution to the study of the geography of India, especially his interpretation of the evolution of drainage systems in the Himalayas and his writings on tropical coastal geomorphology. He wrote books on geomorphology, geology, and the Himalayas in addition to papers in academic journals.

== Early life and education ==
Born in the village of Harpur near Siwan in Bihar, Ahmad received his education in Basti, Uttar Pradesh, and later at Aligarh Muslim University. While still a boy, he was fascinated by nature and rivers. He had an innate love for geography, and while playing on the white sandbanks of the Gandaki River in his village, he would spend hours drawing the map of India on the sands. He took a keen interest in gardening, sketching and was adept in the Persian language.

After completing his Master of Science degree from AMU, he was chosen as a state scholar to pursue his doctorate from the London School of Economics and Political Science and received a scholarship for the same His thesis was titled Settlements in the United Provinces of Agra and Oudh (1949) and described by Oskar Spate as "the best and most detailed" dissertation on settlements.

== Career ==
- 1945–1946: Lecturer at the Aligarh Muslim University
- 1946–1949: PhD from the London School of Economics and Political Science
- 1949–1955: Lecturer at Patna University
- 1955–1983: Head of the Department of Geography, Ranchi University
- 1983–1985: Professor Emeritus, Ranchi University
- 1985–1987: Vice-Chancellor, Magadh University
- 1987–1999: Professor Emeritus, Ranchi University

== Books ==
- Coastal Geomorphology of India, 1972, New Delhi, Orient Longman
- Soil Erosion in India, 1973, New Delhi, Asia Publishing House
- Bihar: A Physical, Economic and Regional Geography, 1965, Ranchi University
- Social and Geographical Aspects of Human Settlements, 1979, New Delhi, Classical Publications
- Geography of the Himalaya, 1992, New Delhi, Kalyani Publishers
- Regional Planning with Particular Reference to India, 1980, New Delhi, Oriental Publishers, and Distributors
- Some aspects of Indian geography, 1976, Allahabad, Central Book Depot
- Settlements in the United Provinces of Agra and Oudh (Ph.D. thesis)
- Physical Geography, 1982, New Delhi, Kalyani Publishers
- Geomorphology, 1985, New Delhi, Kalyani Publishers

He translated into Urdu two geography textbooks - F J Monkhouse's The Principles of Physical Geography and Paul Vidal de La Blache's The Principles of Human Geography.

== Research papers ==
Ahmad wrote research papers on various aspects of geology, geography, and geomorphology of India, many of which were published in the journal that was published from Ranchi University and some in the journal of Aligarh Muslim University. His initial publications on what developed into the Ahmad theory were first published in the Geographical Outlook and Geographer. One of his first published papers, based on his thesis work, was on human settlements in Uttar Pradesh. He wrote Five Cities of the Gangetic Plain: A Cross-Section of Indian Cultural History in 1950 with Oskar Spate, a geographer, and The Rural Population of Bihar in 1961, both of which were published in the Geographical Review.

== Contributions ==
The Ahmad theory of Evolution of Himalayan Drainage System

The fact that the Himalayan rivers seem to have a longer history as compared to the mountains themselves has been a subject of enduring curiosity. Himalayan rivers like the Indus, Sutlej, and the Brahmaputra have created deep gorges across the mountain range to reach the plains of northern India. They have first flowed parallel to the main axis of the mountain in longitudinal troughs, then they have taken sudden bends towards the south, carving the deep gorges. The gorges created by rivers such as the Indus, Sutlej, Alaknanda, Sarju (Kali), Gandaki River, Koshi River, Teesta, and the Brahmaputra suggest that they predate the Himalayan mountain range. The first known theory to explain the Himalayan drainage system came from Pascoe and also Pilgrim. According to their theory the Tibetan Plateau was drained to the west by the mighty Tsangpo-Indus-Oxus combined. Ahmad, on the contrary, had the view that the Tethys Ocean continued as a basin of sedimentation from the Cambrian to the Eocene periods, while most of the Himalayan region was filled by the Gondwana landmass. During the Himalayan upheaval in the Oligocene period, part of the Tethysian geosyncline and probably, part of the Gondwana Land, were uplifted. Most probably this marked the initiation of the Himalayan drainage. It had earlier been proposed that the Himalayan waters reached the plains through the agency of a single river called Indo- Brahma (Pascoe, 1919), or Siwalik (Pilgrim, 1919) and finally drained into the Arabian Sea. Ahmad (1971) argued that this explanation related only to a part of the period in which the evolution of the Himalayan drainage occurred and fails to explain the drainage within the Himalayas themselves. He writes that "the evolution of the Gangetic drainage, as seen at present, really starts with the Himalayan movement, which brought into existence the successive mountain ranges- the Great Himalayas, Lower Himalayan Range, and the Sivalik ranges- into their present shape and altitude. It is these movements and associated thrusts that caused the formation of the Indo-Gangetic depression which is the playground of the Gangetic streams. Again, it was these movements which caused block uplifts along the northern edge of the Central Indian Foreland (Dunn, 1942) sharpening the gradient of the southern tributaries of the Ganga and creating waterfalls along with their courses and gorges as they descend the northern edge of the Central Indian Foreland" (Ahmad, 1971). He, therefore, traced the evolution of the Himalayan drainage commensurate with the geological and tectonic history of the region relating to the upheavals and movements during the Oligocene, Miocene, and Pleistocene period. For this reason, his theory has become the more accepted theory of the Himalayan drainage system.

First Research Journal of Geography in Bihar

According to the National Association of Geographers, he published "more than 64 articles in reputed international and national journals. Under his editorship, the Geographical Outlook, the first research journal of Geography in Bihar, was started in 1956. He had the honour of being the first geographer of the country whose papers were published in Annals of the American Association of Geographers, and Geographical Review. This was indeed a great achievement."

Indian Coastal Geomorphology

Ahmad’s book Coastal Geomorphology of India, published in 1972, was the first book on the subject. "In 22 concise chapters…Ahmad virtually describes every feature along a vast coastline. For this, students of both Geomorphology and India will be most grateful". This pioneering work was created, in the absence of any previous literature on the subject, from large-scale maps. The author was assisted in this work by coastal geomorphologist E.C.E. Bird and A.T.A. Learmonth. Although this work has also been criticized by Schwartz for not being rigorous, geologically, the fact remains that all work on Indian coastal geomorphology is subsequent to and follows this original and fundamental work. This work him brought international recognition.

Ahmad also served as the Asian Contributor for Encyclopedia Britannica.

== Awards ==
Ahmad posthumously received the Bhoogol Ratna Award of 2016 from by the National Association of Geographers, India (NAGI), in the 38th Indian Geography Congress, held at the University of Mysore, Mysuru in recognition of his services to the field.
