= Charles P. Daly Medal =

American Geographical Society award

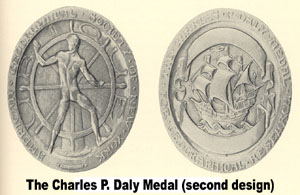
The Charles P. Daly Medal

The Charles P. Daly Medal is awarded to individuals by the American Geographical Society (AGS) "for valuable or distinguished geographical services or labors." The medal was established in 1902. This medal was originally designed by Victor D. Brenner, but the destruction of the dies caused the medal to be redesigned in 1924 by Brenda Putnam.

== History ==
Charles P. Daly was President of the AGS from 1864 until September 19, 1899. However, during this time he rose to prominence in New York State as a Judge on the Court of Common Pleas and became Chief Justice in 1871. In 1902, Daly’s willed funds were used to establish this medal.

== Recipients ==
Source: American Geographical Society

- 1902: Robert E. Peary
- 1906: Thorvald Thoroddsen
- 1908: George Davidson
- 1909: Charles Chaille-Long, William W. Rockhill
- 1910: Grove Karl Gilbert
- 1912: Roald Amundsen
- 1913: Alfred Hulse Brooks
- 1914: Albrecht Penck
- 1915: Paul Vidal de la Blache
- 1917: George G. Chisholm
- 1918: Vilhjalmur Stefansson
- 1920: George Otis Smith
- 1922: Adolphus Washington Greely, Ernest de K. Leffingwell, Sir Francis Younghusband
- 1924: Claude H. Birdseye, Knud Rasmussen
- 1925: Robert A. Bartlett, David L. Brainard
- 1927: Alois Musil
- 1929: Emile Felix Gautier, Filippo De Filippi
- 1930: Nelson H. Darton, Lauge Koch, Joseph B. Tyrrell
- 1931: Gunnar Isachsen
- 1935: Roy Chapman Andrews
- 1938: Alexander Forbes
- 1939: Herbert John Fleure
- 1940: Carl Ortwin Sauer
- 1941: Julio Garzon Nieto
- 1943: Sir Halford J. Mackinder
- 1948: Henri Baulig
- 1950: Laurence Dudley Stamp
- 1952: James Mann Wordie
- 1954: John Kirtland Wright
- 1956: Raoul Blanchard
- 1959: Richard Hartshorne
- 1961: Theodore Monod
- 1962: Osborn Maitland Miller
- 1963: Henry Clifford Darby
- 1964: Jean Gottmann
- 1965: William Skinner Cooper
- 1966: Torsten Hägerstrand
- 1967: Marston Bates
- 1968: O. H. K. Spate
- 1969: Paul B. Sears, William O. Field
- 1971: Gilbert F. White
- 1973: Walter Sullivan
- 1974: Walter A. Wood
- 1978: Roman Drazniowsky
- 1985: Wolfgang Meckelein
- 1986: Donald W. Meinig
- 1991: Robert P. Sharp
- 1999: John R. Mather
- 2011: Mary Lynne Bird
- 2016: Robert Kates
- 2024: John A. Agnew

== See also ==
- List of geography awards
