= Kalema of Buganda =

Ssekabaka Rashid Kalema Muguluma

Kabaka of Buganda
- Reign: 21 October 1888 – 5 October 1889
- Predecessor: Kiweewa of Buganda
- Successor: Mwanga II of Buganda
- Died: 1891; Bunyoro
- Burial: Mmende, Busiro
- Spouse: 1. Lady Nabikukuzi; 2. Lady Sofia Kabak'alongoosa; 3. Lady Nakibuuka I 4. Zefiria Nnampa Nakibuuka II; 5. Lady Nabibooge; 6. Lady Veneneka Nabiwemba; 7. Lady Njera Saabaddu
- Father: Muteesa I of Buganda
- Mother: Namasole Ndibuwakanyi

Rashid Kalema Muguluma was the 33rd Kabaka of the Kingdom of Buganda, within Uganda, from 21 October 1888 until 5 October 1889.

== Claim to the throne ==
Kalema Muguluma was the son of Kabaka Mukaabya Walugembe Muteesa I, Kabaka of Buganda, who reigned between 1856 and 1884. His mother was Ndibuwakanyi, of the Mamba clan. He was declared Kabaka by the Muslim forces that deposed his elder brother Kabaka Kiweewa Mutebi on 21 October 1888. He maintained his capital at Mengo Hill.

== Married life ==
He is recorded to have married the following wives:

1. Nabikukuzi, daughter of Jjumba, of the Nkima clan
2. Sofia Kabakalongoosa, daughter of Kinyolo, of the Nkima clan
3. Nakibuuka, daughter of Mugema, of the Nkima clan
4. Zefiria Nnampa Nakibuuka, daughter of Bakkabulindi of the Ngeye clan
5. Nabibooge, daughter of Kibaya, of the Nsenene clan
6. Veneneka Nabiwemba, daughter of Wakooli, a Musoga, of the Ngabi clan
7. Njera Saabaddu, daughter of Gabunga, of the Mamba clan

== Issue ==
His recorded children include:

1. Prince (Omulangira) Kiweewa Zzimbe, whose mother was Nabikukuzi
2. Prince (Omulangira) Edmond Alamanzaani Ndawula, whose mother was Zefiria Nnampa. He died on July 1, 1916
3. Prince (Omulangira) Yozefu Musanje Walugembe, MBE. He was born on 31 August 1889. His mother was Nabibooge. He was educated at Namilyango College. In October 1914, he was commissioned as a 2nd Lieutenant in the African Native Medical Corps. In 1915, he was promoted to lieutenant. He served in the First World War from 1915 until 1919. He was decorated with the Member of the Order of the British Empire (MBE), the 1915 Star and the British War and Allied Victory medals. On 18 November 1907, he married Sala Kiire, daughter of Chevalier Stanislas Mugwaanya, OBE, GCSG, at the White Fathers' Mission, Nsambya. Prince Musanje fathered four sons and two daughters: (a) Prince (Omulangira) Joseph Mukaabya (b) Prince (Omulangira) Daudi Kimera (c) Prince (Omulangira) Lodoviko Kamanya (d) Prince (omulangila) Emilio Nakibinge and (a) Princess (Omumbejja) Tereza Namukaabya (b) Princess (Omumbejja) Mary Kamuwanda.
4. Princess (Omumbejja) Yuniya Maliamu Kamuwanda, whose mother was Veneneka Nabiwemba. Princess Kamuwanda was installed as Naalinnya to Kabaka Daudi Chwa II on August 14, 1897. She received the Silver Jubilee medal in 1935, the Coronation Medal in 1937 and the Papal medal "Pro Ecclesia et Pontifice" in 1951. She died on May 30, 1951.
5. Princess (Omumbejja) Besemerese Hana Dimbwe. She was born in Kampala in 1887. Her mother was Sofia Kabak'alongoosa. In September 1905, she married, at Mbale, as his third wife, Semei Lwakirenzi Kakungulu, then Kabaka of Bukedi.

== His reign ==
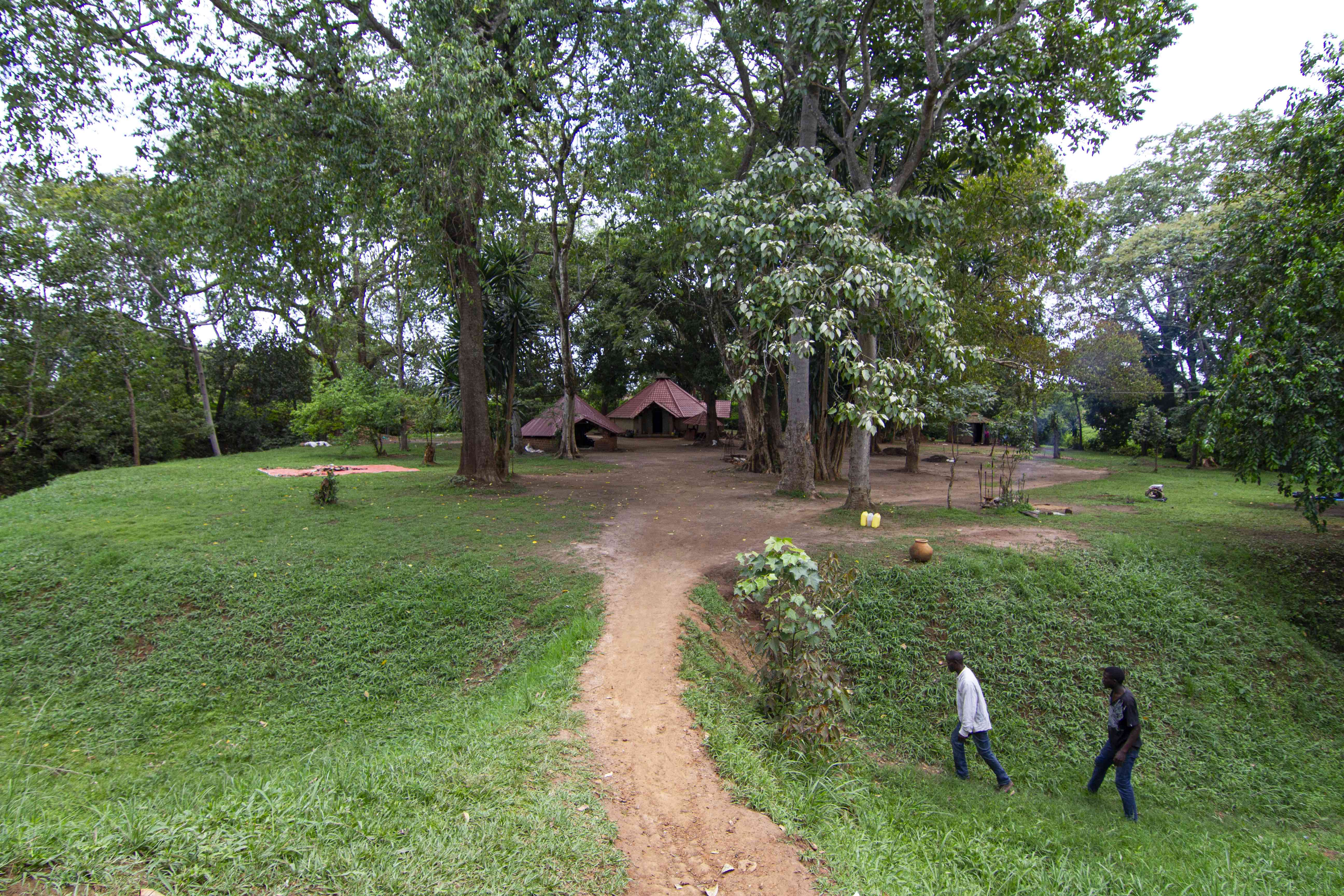
Kalema's prison ditch

The period from 1884 through 1897 witnessed tremendous strife in Buganda. Sufficient Baganda had converted to one of the three major religions in the kingdom; Catholicism, Protestantism or Islam. As the ruling class in the kingdom attempted to adjust to the loss of absolute authority over their subjects' lives to these new religions; the kingdom was thrown into turmoil, rebellion, counter-rebellion and religious persecution.

Within a period of thirteen years from 1884 until 1897, Buganda witnessed the change of leadership at Mengo, six times, which was unprecedented in the kingdom. Various Kabaka's took sides with one religion or the other, only to be deposed by the supporters of the religions they did not choose. And the cycle repeated itself.

In October 1888, the Muslim faction was dominant in Buganda. All Christian missionaries were expelled, and Kabaka Kiweewa Mutebi Nnyonyintono was deposed. Kabaka Kalema Muguluma, who had converted to Islam and taken on the name Rashid, was installed on the throne by Kiweewa's Katikiro, Muguluma. However, only one year later, he was forced to step down by the British imperial forces. He was offered an ultimatum by the British: either convert to Christianity and retain the throne, or remain Muslim and lose the throne. He evidently chose Islam and was deposed.

Two months into his reign, Kalema sent gifts of ivory to the Sultan of Zanzibar and an accompanying letter. In the letter, Kalema proclaimed himself Sultan of Buganda, and declared his plan to turn it into a Muslim state. He made a request for Korans to teach the Muslims, as well as guns to protect his country from Christian invaders.

When the Christian refugees allied themselves with Mwanga, in an attempt to usurp Kalema's throne, Kalema sought to strengthen his position by purging all members of the royal family that could be lured to join the Christian cause. He decreed that all princes and princesses should be burnt alive. About thirty princes and princesses perished in this massacre, including Mwanga's infant sons Kyonya and Kagalo.

This mass killing of his relatives angered public opinion. The manner in which Kiweewa was killed - starved of food for several days, after which he was shot to death and his wives also put to death - was viewed as not fit for the treatment of a king, and a blemish on the institution of the Kabaka. Therefore the people were less willing to enlist for his army in the forthcoming war against the Christian forces. In the ensuing war, he was defeated and fled to Singo.

== The final years ==
After his removal from the throne by the British, Kabaka Kalema went into exile in Bunyoro. He died in exile from complications of smallpox in January 1891. At the time of his death, his age is estimated to have been in the mid-twenties. His remains were repatriated and buried at Mmende in Busiro.

== See also ==
- Kabaka of Buganda

Preceded by Kiweewa Nnyonyintono	King of Buganda; 1888–1889	Succeeded by Mwanga II Mukaabya
