= Gilbert F. White =

American geographer (1911–2006)

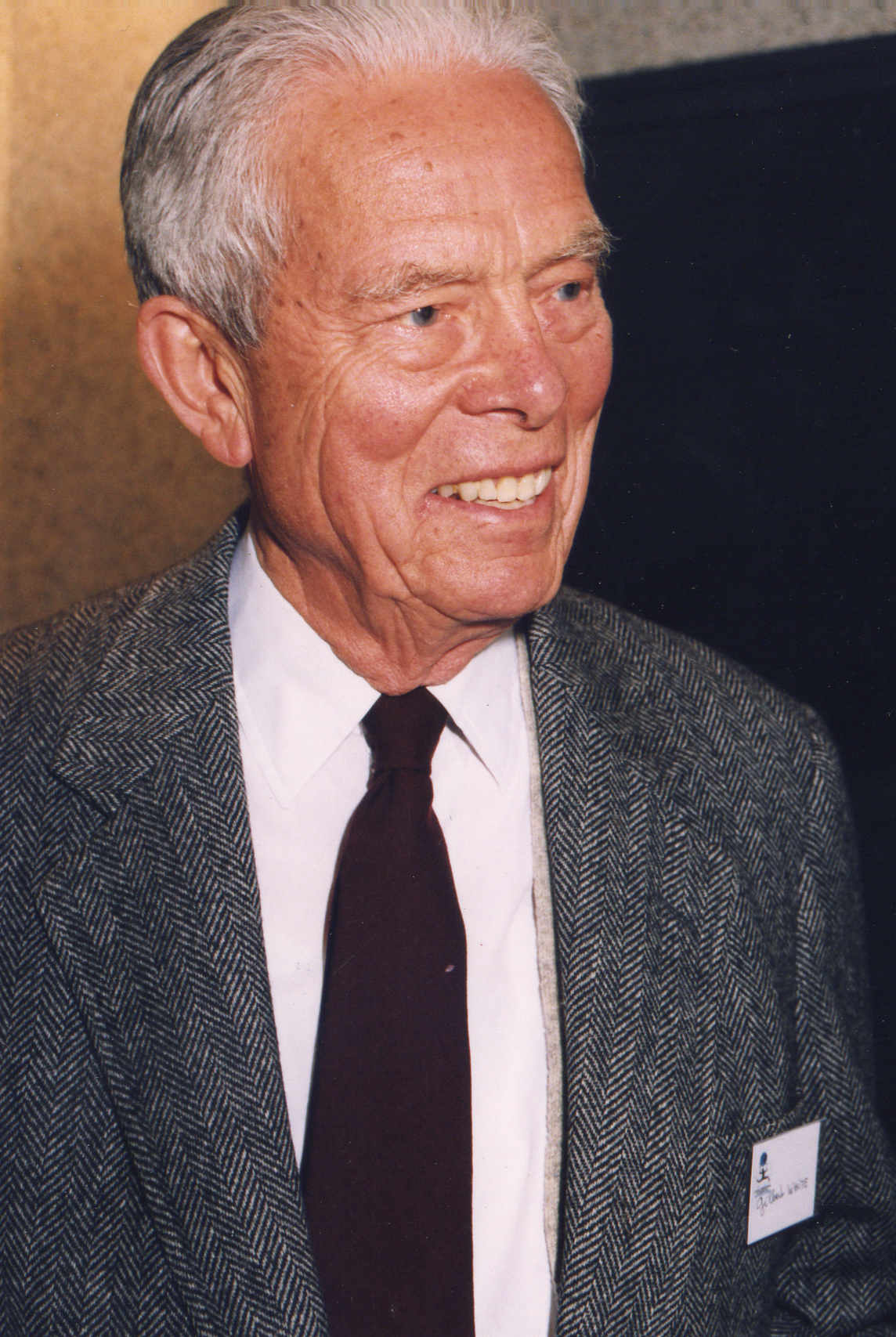
- Born: November 26, 1911; Chicago, Illinois, U.S.
- Died: October 5, 2006 (aged 94); Boulder, Colorado, U.S.
- Education: University of Chicago; University of Colorado
- Awards: Charles P. Daly Medal (1971); Tyler Prize for Environmental Achievement (1987); Volvo Environment Prize (1995)
- Scientific career
- Fields: Geography
- Workplaces: University of Chicago

Gilbert Fowler White (November 26, 1911 – October 5, 2006) was a prominent American geographer, sometimes termed the "father of floodplain management" and the "leading environmental geographer of the 20th century" (Wescoat, 2006). White is known predominantly for his work on natural hazards, particularly flooding, and the importance of sound water management in contemporary society.

== Background ==
White was raised in Chicago in the Hyde Park neighborhood, and spent summers in the Tongue River Valley of Wyoming, before studying at the University of Chicago, where he earned his B.S. in 1932 and his PhD in 1942 (published 1945). From 1946 to 1955 he was president of Haverford College. He then returned to Chicago as a professor of geography, where he was the central figure in the "Chicago school" of natural hazards research.

He received the Quantrell Award.

In 1970, he moved to the University of Colorado, before retiring after ten years there. Having published his first paper in 1935, he was still publishing into his 90s (Wescoat and White, 2003).

White was motivated by his Quaker faith to do research beneficial to humanity. As a conscientious objector to World War II, from 1942 to 1946 he served with the American Friends Service Committee aiding war refugees in France, and was briefly interned by the Nazis at Baden-Baden. He continued to serve as a leader in various Quaker service organizations for much of his life. He was also heavily involved in applying his research to reform flooding and water policy in the United States and the Middle East. He served on the President's Water Resources Policy Commission.

In 1944, White married Anne Underwood, with whom he had three children (Will, Mary, and Frances). Anne collaborated with Gilbert in his research until her death in 1989. Gilbert remarried in 2003 to Claire Sheridan.

== Scholarly contributions ==
White's main contributions to society and to scholarship have been classified by Kates (2011) as follows:

- How to bring safe water to all the world's people as a human right
- How to reduce significantly the global toll of hazard deaths and damages
- How to facilitate peace, through joint water development and management
- How to make geography (in particular) and science (in general) more useful to the world
- How to enable people to coexist with nature and develop sustainably.

In 1972, at the United Nations Conference on the Human Environment in Stockholm, Gilbert F. White and meteorologist Thomas Malone proposed the program of environmental monitoring. The ideas of environmental monitoring were announced in the brochure Environmental Monitoring: Physical and Chemical Measurements, where environmental monitoring was understood as a systematic observation of the environment and identification of possible changes, especially in connection with human activities. At the meeting participants proposed to build a system of controlling anthropogenic changes of the environment which would allow planning environmental management measures. In 1972, at the UN Conference on the Human Environment the program of environmental monitoring and establishing biosphere reserves was accepted.

Some of White's most notable work involved the identification and classification of adjustment mechanisms for flooding in the United States, perceptions of natural hazards, and choice of natural hazard adjustments (Hinshaw, 2006). White identified adjustments to flooding as being either structural or non-structural. He advocated, where feasible, adaptation to or accommodation of flood hazards rather than the "structural" solutions (dams, levees, and floodwalls, for example) that dominated policy in the early 20th century. Structural adjustments, developed by engineers, are designed to modify flooding hazards so that humans are protected and can continue to live in areas that are periodically subject to flooding (floodplains). White's non-structural adjustments consist of arrangements imposed by a governing body (local, regional, or national) to restrict the use of floodplains, or flexible human adjustments to flood risk that do not involve substantial investment in flood controls (Tobin and Montz, 1997).

In his influential dissertation entitled "Human adjustment to floods," published in 1945 by the University of Chicago Department of Geography, White argued that an overreliance on structural works in the United States had actually increased damage by flooding, rather than decreasing them. He argued famously in this work – deemed by several commentators to be the most important contribution made by a geographer in 20th-century North America (Hinshaw 2006, Kates 2007) – that "Floods are an act of God, but flood losses are largely an act of man". Public confidence in structural works increased occupance of, and building on floodplains. Design standards are sometimes inappropriate, and overconfidence develops, resulting in worse disasters if a flood breaches defenses. A recent and relevant example of the impacts of undue confidence in structural works can be seen in Hurricane Katrina's impact on New Orleans, during the summer of 2005. Historically, at least in the US, works were built to certain design specifications (for example, the 100-year flood, or 1% flood). In instances where the design specifications were exceeded (in the case of a 150-year flood, etc.), they failed, thus causing catastrophic loss in overdeveloped floodplains (White et al., 1958).

White worked under President Johnson in committees that advised the establishment of the National Flood Insurance Program – although he was not happy when his cautions were ignored and the NFIP was rolled out too quickly.

White also made major contributions to the human occupance of arid lands and the management problems of such settlements, campaigned on the dangers of nuclear weapons, and sat on many committees dealing with water management in developing countries. He oversaw informal brokering of water management conflicts in the Middle East.

Gilbert F. White, along with his former students and colleagues including Robert Kates and Ian Burton, have become some of the most influential scholars of natural and technological hazards.

== Recognition ==
White received numerous honours in his lifetime.

- Honorary Fellowship from the American Geographical Society in 1963, and its Daly Medal in 1971.
- In 2000 he was awarded the Public Welfare Medal from the National Academy of Sciences.
- White was elected to the National Academy of Sciences in 1973,
- Fellow, the American Academy of Arts and Sciences.
- Member of the American Philosophical Society (1993)
- Recipient of the United Nations Sasakawa International Environment Prize (1985)
- Laureat d'Honneur, International Geographical Union (1988)
- the Volvo Environment Prize (1995)
- the National Medal of Science from the NSF (2000).

White received honorary doctorates from the University of Colorado, Earlham College, Hamilton College, Haverford College, Michigan State University, Swarthmore College, Augustana College and the University of Arizona.

The Association of State Floodplain Managers makes several awards in his name.

- The Goddard-White Award honors the contributions made to floodplain management by Gilbert White and Jim Goddard (1906-1994)
- the Gilbert F. White National Flood Policy Forum and the ASFPM Flood Hazard Fellowship.
- Resources for the Future (RFF) runs the Gilbert F. White Postdoctoral Fellowship Program.
- There is a Gilbert White Award offered yearly by the Association of American Geographers Hazards Specialty Group.
- Gilbert F. White Doctoral Fellowship, Department of Geography, University of Colorado.
- In 2008, a Gilbert White Chair was inaugurated at Arizona State University, occupied by Billie Lee Turner II.
- In a move organized by John Thompson (Sussex Univ.) the Gilbert F. White Reference Room is archived at the U.S. Army Corps of Engineers, Institute for Water Resources, Fort Belvoir, Virginia.

== Publications ==
White has over 400 publications to his name.

Books

- White, G.F. 1945. Human Adjustment to Floods. Department of Geography Research Paper no. 29. Chicago: The University of Chicago. Download (PDF)
- White, G.F. and American Friends Service Committee. 1949. The United States and the Soviet Union. Yale University Press.
- White, G.F. With the committee. 1949. Task Force Report on Organization and Policy in the Field of Natural Resources. Executive Branch of the Government, Washington, DC: U.S. Government Printing Office.
- White, G.F. With the commission. 1950. A Water Policy for the American People. Report of the President's Water Policy Commission. Washington, DC: U.S. Government Printing Office.
- White, G.F. (ed.). 1956. The Future of Arid Lands. Washington, DC: American Association for the Advancement of Science. (In English and Russian.)
- White, G.F. With the committee. 1957. The Need for Basic Research with Respect to Renewable Natural Resources. Washington, DC: National Academy of Sciences/National Research Council.
- White, G.F. With the committee. 1958. Integrated River Basin Development. New York: U.N. Department of Economic and Social Affairs. (In English, French and Spanish.). Reprinted with new intro, 1970.
- White, G.F., W.C. Calef, J.W. Hudson, H.M. Mayer, J.R. Shaeffer, and D.J. Volk. 1958. Changes in Urban Occupance of Flood Plains in the United States. Department of Geography Research Papers, No. 57. Chicago: University of Chicago.
- White, G.F. 1960. Science and the Future of Arid Lands. Paris: United Nations Educational, Scientific and Cultural Organization. (In English, French and Spanish.)
- White, G.F. 1961. Papers on Flood Problems. Department of Geography Research Papers, No. 70. Chicago: University of Chicago.
- White, G.F. 1964. Choice of Adjustment to Floods. Department of Geography Research Papers, No. 93. Chicago: University of Chicago.
- White, G.F. With the committee. 1966. Alternatives in Water Management. Report of the Committee on Water, Division of Earth Sciences. Washington, DC: National Academy of Sciences.
- White, G.F. With the commission. Weather and Climate Modification Report of the Special Commission on Weather Modification. Washington, DC: National Science Foundation.
- White, G.F. With the committee. 1967. African and American Universities Program, 1958–1966: A Summary. University of Chicago.
- White, G.F. With the committee. 1968. Water and Choice in the Colorado Basin: An Example of Alternatives in Water Management. National Research Council Committee on Water. No. 1689. Washington, DC: National Academy of Sciences.
- White, G.F. 1969. Strategies of American Water Management. Ann Arbor: The University of Michigan Press. (In English and Russian.)
- White, G.F. (ed.). 1969. Water, Health and Society, Selected Papers by Abel Wolman. Bloomington: Indiana University Press.
- White, G.F., D.J. Bradley and A.U. White. 1972. Drawers of Water: Domestic Water Use in East Africa. Chicago: University of Chicago Press.
- White, G.F. With the committee. 1972. Man-made Lakes as Modified Ecosystems. SCOPE Report No. 2. Paris: International Council of Scientific Unions.
- White, G.F. With the committee. 1972. The Agnes Floods. Report for the Administrator of the National Oceanic and Atmospheric Administration by the National Advisory Committee on Oceans and Atmosphere. Washington, DC: U.S. Government Printing Office.
- White, G.F., W.C. Ackermann and E.B. Worthington (eds.). 1973. Man-made Lakes: Their Problems and Environmental Effects. Geophysical Monograph 17. Washington, DC: American Geophysical Union.
- White, G.F. (ed.). 1974. Natural Hazards: Local, National, Global. New York: Oxford University Press. (In Russian, 1978).
- White, G.F. and J.E. Haas. 1975. Assessment of Research on Natural Hazards. Cambridge, MA: MIT Press.
- Brinkmann, W.A.R., H.C. Cochrane, N.J. Ericksen and White, G.F. 1975. Flood Hazard in the United States: A Research Assessment. Boulder: University of Colorado, Institute of Behavioral Science.
- White, G.F. with the committee. 1976. Natural Hazard Management in Coastal Areas. Washington, DC: National Oceanic and Atmospheric Administration, Office of Coastal Zone Management.
- White, G.F. With the committee. 1976. Water for All. Statement of the International Institute for Environment and Development. Earthscan. (In English, Spanish, French and Arabic)
- White, G.F. (ed.). 1977. Environmental Effects of Complex River Development: International Experience. Boulder: Westview Press.
- Holdgate, M.W. and White, G.F.(eds.). 1977. Environmental Issues. SCOPE Report 10. Chichester: John Wiley.
- Burton I., RW. Kates and White, G.F. 1978. The Environment as Hazard. Oxford University Press (reissued with new intro, Guilford Press, 1993). Google Books
- White, G.F. (ed.). 1978. Environmental Effects of Arid Land Irrigation in Developing Countries. Paris: UNESCO.
- Holdgate, M.W., M. Kassas and White, G.F. (eds.). 1982. The World Environment, 1972–1982. Dublin: Tycooly International Publishing.
- London, J. and White, G.F. (eds.)1984. The Environmental Effects of Nuclear War. Boulder: Westview Press.
- Dotts, L. and a steering Committee including White. 1986. Planet Earth in Jeopardy: Environmental Consequence of Nuclear War. Colchester: John Wiley and Sons.
- Mather J.R. and G.V. Sdayuk. (eds.). 1991. Global Change: Geographical Approaches—A Joint USSR-USA Project under the Scientific Leadership of Vladimir M. Kotlyakov and Gilbert F. White. Tucson: University of Arizona Press( also in Russian). (input by White)
- White, G.F. and M.F. Myers (eds.). 1994. Coping with the Flood: The Next Phase. Special journal issue of Water Resources Update, 95(spring).
- White, G.F. with 14 others. 1995. Technical Bases for Yucca Mountain Standards. Washington, DC: National Academy Press. Download
- White, G.F. With the committee. 1999. Water for the Future: The West Bank and Gaza Strip, Israel and Jordan. Committee on Sustainable Water Supplies in the Middle East. Washington, DC: National Academy Press. Download
- Wescoat, J.L. Jr and G.F. White. 2003. Water for Life: Water Management and Environmental Policy. Cambridge University Press. Google preview

== See also ==
- Geographers on Film
