= Robert Kates =

American geographer and independent scholar

Robert W. Kates (January 31, 1929 – April 21, 2018) was an American geographer and independent scholar in Trenton, Maine, and University Professor (Emeritus) at Brown University.

== Background ==
Kates was born in Brooklyn, New York. Unusually for an academic, he never completed an undergraduate degree. He studied Economics at New York University from 1946-8, but dropped out. He married Ellie Hackman (d.2016) at the age of 19 and went to work in a steel mill in Indiana for 12 years, working with the labor union and other movements. He had a chance encounter with a naturalist in a state park in Indiana when on vacation with his family, and this meeting inspired him to train to become an elementary school teacher, a job he thought would free up summer vacations for the family. To realise this career he signed up for night school at Indiana University, Gary in 1957, when aged 28. One of his classes to become a teacher was in geography. Having found his calling and his discipline, he sought study advice from Gilbert F. White at the University of Chicago. White gave him some key texts to read, Kates returned to discuss them, White recognized his abilities and steered him through an MA and eventually a PhD in Geography (1962). Kates taught at the Graduate School of Geography, Clark University from 1962 until 1987. At Clark he founded CENTED (the Centre for Technology, Environment, and Development), now part of the Marsh Institute, where he remained a Distinguished Scientist. He worked in Africa with Clark colleagues, and also developed and directed a resource assessment centre at the University of Dar Es Salaam, Tanzania (from 1967–68).

Kates helped to establish the international Initiative for Science and Technology for Sustainability, was Executive Editor of Environment magazine for many years, and was a Senior Associate at Harvard University.

From 1986 to 1992 he was Professor and Director of the interdisciplinary World Hunger Program at Brown University. Kates retired relatively early, became an 'independent scholar' and moved to Trenton, Maine overlooking the Narrows in the early 1990s. Kates had three children, 6 grandchildren and 4 great-grandchildren. He remained professionally active until his mid 80s and in 2008 (at age 79), was appointed the inaugural Presidential Professor of Sustainability Science at the University of Maine, Orono.

== Contributions ==
Kates's research focused on long-term trends in environment, development, and population, and he is particularly known for his work on natural hazards mitigation, driven by a Quaker belief in relevance to human society. Kates defines his central question as "What is and ought to be the human use of the Earth?" This led him to address the human use of natural resources and human response to hazards. His approach was to set up "natural" experiments, and then to develop a set of comparative observations or analogs. This led to several studies of natural and technological hazards, rural resource and water development, and methodologies for studying people's perception of the environment, the assessment of risk, and the impacts of climate on society. Since retiring from Brown University he continued to work on:

- the sustainability transition
- long-term population dynamics
- global environmental change
- the prevalence and persistence of hunger
- sustainability science

Following the devastation of New Orleans after Hurricane Katrina, Kates returned to his earlier work on hazards and published a research perspective on the reconstruction of New Orleans (Kates et al., 2006).

== Honours ==
Among several honours:

- Recipient of the 1991 National Medal of Science (USA)
- MacArthur Fellow (1981–85)
- Member of the National Academy of Sciences, USA
- Member of the American Academy of Arts and Sciences
- Fellow of the American Association for the Advancement of Science
- Fellow of the Academia Europaea.
- Laureat d’Honneur, International Geographical Union
- Recipient of 2016 Charles P. Daly Medal from the American Geographical Society
- Stanley Brun Award for Creativity from the American Association of Geographers (AAG), *Lifetime Achievement Award from the Human Dimensions of Global Change section of the AAG.

Kates was awarded honorary DSc degrees from Clark University for his many contributions to hazards research (1993) and from the University of Maine (2004).

== Critique ==
Kates's work on hazards, and his 'human ecology' approach, some of it coauthored with Ian Burton (Burton and Kates 1978), attracted critique from scholars including Michael Watts (1983a, b) and former student Ben Wisner (1976, 2004). The insight of these critiques is that "natural" hazards are in fact exacerbated by political and economic forces, and they should be seen as "social", not "natural". To suggest that severe drought - or even the flooding of New Orleans - are "natural" underplays the ways that powerful political and economic interests make people more vulnerable. Humans cannot "adapt" or, in Kates's language, "adjust" successfully to hazards when a population is highly vulnerable or even exploited (Watts, 1983a). Mitigating natural hazards is therefore a social justice issue, not a case of adjustment. This has been much-debated in Wisner et al.'s At Risk (2004). Kates generally chose not to respond openly to his critics.

== Books ==
- Kates, R.W. 1962. Hazard and Choice Perception in Flood Plain Management. Department of Geography Research Paper no. 78, University of Chicago Press.
- Kates, R.W. 1965. Industrial Flood Losses: Damage estimation in the Lehigh Valley. University of Chicago Press.
- Kates, RW. and J. Wohlwill (eds). 1966. Man's Response to the Physical Environment. Journal of Social Issues, Vol. XXII, No. 4, October.
- Burton, I. and Kates, R.W. (Eds.). 1965. Readings in Resource Management and Conservation. University of Chicago Press.
- Burton, I, R W. Kates, J R. Mather and R E. Snead, The Shores of Megalopolis: Coastal Occupance and Human Adjustment to Flood Hazard Climatology, Vol. XVIII, No. 3, 1965, pp. 435–603
- Burton, I, R.W. Kates and R.E.Snead. 1969. The human ecology of coastal flood hazard in megalopolis. Dept. of Geography. Research paper no. 115. University of Chicago Press.
- Russell, C.S., Arey D.G and R.W. Kates. 1970. Drought and Water Supply: Implications of the Massachusetts Experience for Municipal Planning. RFF Press.
- Kates, R.W. (Ed.). 1977. Managing Technological Hazard: Research Needs and Opportunities. Boulder: Institute of Behavioral Science.
- Hass J.E, R.W. Kates and M.J. Bowden. 1977. Reconstruction Following Disaster. MIT Press.
- Kates, R.W. 1978. Risk Assessment of Environmental Hazards. SCOPE Report 8. John Wiley.
- Burton I and Kates R.W. 1978. The Environment as Hazard. Oxford University Press. Second edition with a new introduction: Guilford Press, 1993.
- Kasperson R.E. and R.W. Kates. 1980. Equity Issues in Radioactive Waste Management. Greenwood Press.
- Berry L. and R.W. Kates (Eds.). 1980. Making the Most of the Least: Alternative Ways to Development. New York and London: Holmes & Meier.
- Kates, R.W. 1984. Technological Hazards Management. Oelgeschlager Gunn & Hain.
- Kates, R. W., J. H. Ausubel, and M. Berberian (eds.), 1985. Climate Impact Assessment: Studies of the Interaction of Climate and Society, ICSU/SCOPE Report No. 27, John Wiley.
- Kates R.W., Hohenemser C. and J.X. Kasperson (Eds.). 1985. Perilous progress: Managing the hazards of technology. Westview Press.
- Kates, R.W. and I. Burton (Eds.). 1986. Geography, Resources and Environment, Volume 1: Selected Writings of Gilbert F. White. University of Chicago Press.
- Kates R.W. and I. Burton (Eds.). 1986. Geography, Resources and Environment, Volume 2: Themes from the Work of Gilbert F. White. University of Chicago Press.
- Kasperson, RE., JX. Kasperson, C Hohenemser, and RW. Kates. 1988. Corporate Management of Health and Safety Hazards: A Comparison of Current Practice. Boulder, Colorado: Westview Press.
- Newman L, (gen.eds. Kates, R.W. et al.) 1990. Hunger in History: Food Shortage, Poverty, and Deprivation. Blackwell.
- J.X. Kasperson and R.W. Kates, (eds.), 1990. Overcoming Hunger in the 1990s, a special issue of Food Policy, Vol.15, No. 4, pp. 273–368.
- Turner, B.L. II, Hyden G, and R.W. Kates (Eds.). 1993. Population Growth and Agricultural Change in Africa. University of Florida Press.
- Turner, B.L. II, W.C. Clark, R.W. Kates, J.F. Richards, J.T. Mathews, W.B. Meyer (Eds.). 1990. The Earth as Transformed by Human Action: Global and Regional Changes in the Biosphere over the Past 300 Years. Cambridge University Press.
- Chen, RS. and RW. Kates (eds.). 1994. Climate Change and World Food Security special issue of Global Environmental Change, Vol. 4 No.1, March, 1994, pp. 1–88.
- Burton, I. and Kates. R.W. (committee chairs). 1999. Our Common Journey: A Transition Toward Sustainability. National Academy of Sciences.
- Raskin, P, T. Banuri, G.Gallopín, P. Gutman, A. Hammond, R.W. Kates, and R. Swart. 2002. Great Transition: The Promise and Lure of the Times Ahead. Stockholm Environment Institute.
- Kates R.W. et al. 2003. Global Change in Local Places: Estimating, Understanding, and Reducing Greenhouse Gases. Cambridge University Press.
- Kates, R.W. with National Academies Committee on Facilitating Interdisciplinary Research, 2005. Facilitating Interdisciplinary Research, Washington DC: National Academy Press.
- 2010. With National Academies, Committee on America’s Climate Choices, Panel on Adapting to the Impacts of Climate Change. Adapting to the Impacts of Climate Change, Washington: National Academies Press.
- Kates R.W.(ed.) 2011. Readings in Sustainability Science and Technology. Centre for International Development, Harvard University. ("This Reader is one possible set of materials for advanced undergraduate and beginning graduate students of sustainability science. It consists of links to 93 articles or book chapters from which appropriate readings and internet sources can be chosen")
- Kates, R.W. 2011. Gilbert F. White, 1911-2006, A Biographical Memoir. Washington, DC: National Academy of Sciences.

== Recent Articles ==
- Kates, R.W., W.C. Clark, R. Corell, J.M. Hall, et al. 2001. Sustainability science, Science 292: 641-642.
- Parris, T.M. and R.W. Kates. 2003. Characterizing and Measuring Sustainable Development. Annual Review of Environment and Resources. 559-586.
- Leiserowitz, A.A., R.W. Kates and T.M. Parris. 2005. Do Global Attitudes and Behaviors Support Sustainable Development? Environment: Science and Policy for Sustainable Development 47(9): 22-38.
- Kates, R.W., T.M. Parris, and A.A. Leiserowitz. 2005. What is Sustainable Development? Goals, Indicators, Values, and Practice. Environment: Science and Policy for Sustainable Development 47(3): 8-21.
- Kates, R.W., C.E. Colten, S.Laska, and S.P. Leatherman. 2006. Reconstruction of New Orleans after Hurricane Katrina: A research perspective. Proceedings of the National Academy of Sciences. Special Feature. 103(40) (26 September): 14653-14660.
- Kates, R.W. 2007. Gilbert F. White, 1911-2006, Great Aspirations: Local Studies, National Comparisons, Global Challenges. First National Academy of Sciences Gilbert F. White Lecture in the Geographical Sciences. January 24, 2007. The National Academies Keck Center, Washington, D.C.
- Kates, R.W. and P. Dasgupta. 2007. African Poverty: A Grand Challenge for Sustainability Science. Proceedings of the National Academy of Sciences. 104(43): 16747-16750.
- Colten, C.E., R.W. Kates, and S.B. Laska. 2008. Three Years after Katrina: Lessons for Community Resilience. Environment: Science and Policy for Sustainable Development. 50(5): 36-47.
- Kates, R.W. and I. Burton, 2008. Gilbert F. White, 1911–2006: Local Legacies, National Achievements, and Global Visions. Annals of the Association of American Geographers. 98(2): 1-8.
- Wilbanks, T.J. and Kates, R.W. 2010. Beyond Adapting to Climate Change: Embedding Adaptation in Responses to Multiple Threats and Stresses. Annals of the Association of American Geographers. 100(4):719-728.
- Kates, R.W. 2011. What kind of a science is sustainability science? Proceedings of the National Academy of Sciences. 108(49): 19449-19450.
- Kates, R.W. (ed.). 2011. From the Unity of Nature to Sustainability Science: Ideas and Practice. CID Working Paper No. 218. Center for International Development, Harvard University.
- Kates, R.W., W.R. Travis and T.J. Wilbanks. 2012. Transformational adaptation when incremental adaptations to climate change are insufficient. Proceedings of the National Academy of Sciences. 109(19): 7156-7161.
- Kates, R.W. 2012. Natural Hazards, Climate Change, and Adaptation: Persistent Questions and Answers. South Australian Geographical Journal. 111: 43-55.
