= Muteesa I of Buganda =

Kabaka of Buganda (1837–1884)

Ssekabaka Muteesa I Mukaabya Walugembe Kayiira
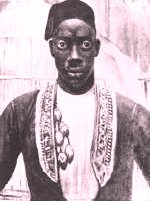
- Mutesa I

Kabaka of Buganda
- Reign: 1856–1884
- Predecessor: Suuna II of Buganda
- Successor: Mwanga II of Buganda
- Born: c. 1837; Mulago Hill, Kampala, Uganda
- Died: October 1884 (aged 47); Kasubi Nabulagala, Kampala, Uganda
- Burial: Kasubi Nabulagala
- Spouse: He married at least 85 wives
- House: Abalasangeye dynasty
- Father: Suuna II of Buganda
- Mother: Nnabakyala Muganzirwazza of Njovu Clan

Muteesa I Mukaabya Walugembe Kayiira (c. 1837–9 October 1884) was the 30th Kabaka of the Kingdom of Buganda, from 1856 until 1884. His name is also spelt as Mtesa, M'tesa (in old documents) and as Mutesa (in many English documents).

== Biography ==
He was born at the Batandabezaala Palace, at Mulago, in 1837. He was the son of Kabaka Ssuuna II Kalema Kasinjo, Kabaka of Buganda, who reigned between 1832 and 1856. His mother was Nabakyala Muganzirwazza, the Namasole, one of the 148 recorded wives of his father. He ascended the throne upon the death of his father in October 1856.

According to historian MSM Kiwanuka, Muteesa was "an insignificant obscure prince", compared to his brothers Prince Kajumba and Prince Kiyimba. Kajumba was his father's preferred heir, as Suuna frequently pointed out to his chiefs the heroic qualities of the prince. However, the chiefs, led by the Katikkiro Kayiira felt that Kajumba would be difficult to control. Muteesa, an unpopular choice, was chosen ahead of his brothers.

The country groaned and rumbled that Kayiira’s choice of Mukaabya, a young and weakling prince, was a deliberate manoeuvre to enable him to become the real ruler of the land.

— MSM Kiwanuka.

He was crowned at Nabulagala. He established his capital, first on Banda Hill. Later he abandoned that palace and established capitals at Nakatema, Nabbingo, Kabojja, and finally at Kasubi, Nabulagala. The capital at Kabojja got its name due to the numerous executions carried out while the king was resident there, as the name echoes something as deadly as a snake bite.

Following his ascension to the throne, Muteesa, with the help of Kayiira, had his rival princes imprisoned on Kisimi Island. Some notable chiefs hatched a plot to overthrow the new king and replace him with Prince Kiyimba. However, the plot was foiled and the conspirators, along with Prince Kiyimba and Prince Kajumba, were executed.

=== Reign ===
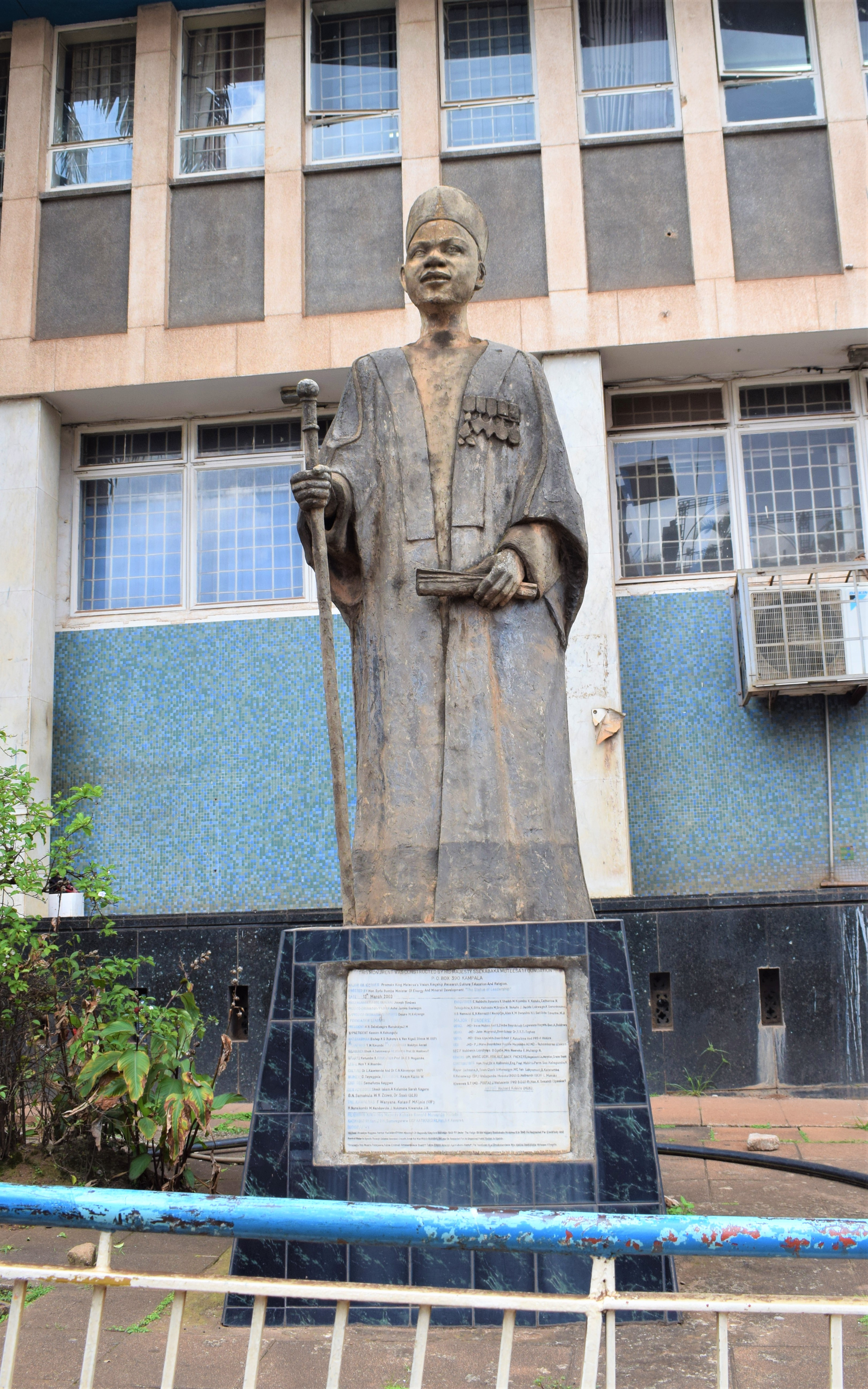
Muteesa I of Buganda monument

Like his forefathers, Muteesa fought several wars of conquest to expand Buganda's territory, to protect its trade routes and to defend it against external foes like Bunyoro Kitara, the Khedivate of Egypt, armed slave traders and Buvuma. These trade routes enabled Buganda to trade its Ivory, Barkcloth, Bananas, fish, and slaves for firearms, salt, cloth Textile, copper wire, Iron axes, hoes and knives from the East African coast, Zanzibar and neighboring Kingdoms. Control of the trade routes also allowed Muteesa and the Buganda Kingdom to control the goods (especially limiting fire arms and ammunition, Arab traders and eventually Europeans) that went into its rival Kingdom, Bunyoro.

Like his father Ssuuna II, Muteesa expanded Buganda's naval fleet to gain more influence and control over parts of Lake Nnalubaale especially Ssese Islands and Buvuma which would later become an important trade route for Buganda's Ivory.

Muslim Swahili and Arab traders from Zanzibar were increasingly established in Buganda since the 1840s to trade firearms, gunpowder, salt, and cloth in exchange for ivory and slaves. During Kabaka Muteesa I's reign, these contacts continued. Muteesa I eventually converted to Islam (but was never circumcised) probably due to the influence of his Arab traders like Khamis bin Abdullah. It is said that Katikkiro Mukasa dissuaded him from getting circumcised.

Muteesa intervened in Bunyoro's succession civil war after the death of the Omukama Kamurasi in order to gain influence over Bunyoro Kitara. Muteesa actively supported Ruyonga who was a bitter enemy and rival of Kamurasi and Kabalega. The support included the provision of troops from Buganda.

At the same time, contact was made with European visitors for the first time in 1862 when John Hanning Speke and James Augustus Grant arrived. Muteesa sent an invitation to Speke through his friend Rumanyika Orugundu I, King of Karagwe Kingdom in modern day Tanzania. The positive accounts of the Europeans attracted more visitors and Henry Morton Stanley arrived in 1875.

General Charles George Gordon Pasha governor of Equatoria province, the Khedivate of Egypt, sent several armed envoys to Buganda. One envoy was Charles Chaillé-Long in 1874 and another, in 1875, was Colonel M. Ernest Linant de Bellefonds, son of the renowned French engineer Louis Maurice Adolphe Linant de Bellefonds. Gordon wanted Muteesa I to stop selling Buganda's ivory to the Sultanate of Zanzibar and instead sell it to the Khedivate of Egypt. Sending the ivory to Gondokoro, Sudan would help solve the financial problems of Gordon's administration. And according to Charles Chaillé-Long, Muteesa was asked and signed an agreement that made Buganda Kingdom a vassal of the Khedivate of Egypt. The agreement and/or Muteesa's consent to it, are disputed by several other researchers and historians. However as a show of force, and with the consent of Kabaka Muteesa, Gordon did eventually send troops led by Nuer Aga to Lubaga, Buganda Kingdom. The troops built a military station near Lubaga. Direct control of the Buganda Kingdom would have given the Khedivate of Egypt greater control over the River Nile (Omugga Kiyira in Luganda).

In order to protect his kingdom, Muteesa I needed modern firearms, ammunition, science, technology and alliances with a more powerful entity like the British Empire. Muteesa had Henry Morton Stanley write an open letter on his behalf to Queen Victoria. The letter was an open invitation to "practical" Christian missionaries to come to Buganda and convert Baganda to Christianity, cure diseases, construct modern houses and improve agriculture. This letter was handed to Colonel M. Ernest Linant de Bellefonds who Stanley met at Muteesa's court in 1875. Unfortunately, Linant was killed in Sudan before he could deliver the letter but it still found its way to Gordon and onto the United Kingdom and was published in the Daily Telegraph in November 1875.

As a result of the letter, the first set of Protestant missionaries, Lieutenant Shergold Smith, Rev. C.T. Wilson, Edward John Baxter and Henry Cole, from the Church Missionary Society (CMS, Church Mission Society), arrived in Buganda in 1877. Catholic missionaries from the White fathers (White fathers mission) arrived in 1879, in the persons of Fr. Siméon Lourdel Marpel (aka Simon Mapeera), M.Afr., and Brother Delmas Amans (aka Amansi), M.Afr and both groups eventually met Kabaka Muteesa.

All three visitor groups (the Muslims, Catholics and Protestants) were made to believe that Kabaka Muteesa I preferred their religion over the others. They thus wrote favorable reviews back home to their respective governments, encouraging trade and friendly relations. As a result, Buganda, and Uganda were not colonized but were offered status of a protectorate.

Muteesa's relationship with the Catholic Church was strong, such that much of his court converted and also many of his people. This would later cause controversy, however, when his son succeeded him and was far less friendly to the missionaries' cause (going so far as to murder Christians on multiple occasions).

=== Death ===
He died at Kasubi Nabulagala on 9 October 1884 at the age of 47, and was buried on 18 October 1884 at Kasubi, the first Kabaka to be buried there. In 2007, Muteesa I Royal University was opened in his name, in recognition of his contribution to the education of the people of Buganda and Uganda. The first chancellor of the university was Kabaka Ronald Muwenda Mutebi II, the current reigning Buganda monarch. In June 2016, Julia Sebutinde was installed as chancellor of the University, replacing Kabaka Mutebi II, who installed her and then became The Visitor of the University. Kabaka Mutebi being Chancellor was making it hard for Regulatory Authorities of the Ugandan Universities system to hold the institution accountable on some issues since being King of the largest ethnic group in the country makes him someone who is sacred.

== Marriages and issue ==
Muteesa I Mukaabya Walugembe Kayiira is reported to have married 87 wives.

He is reported to have fathered 98 children, including:

- Kabaka Danieri Basammula-Ekkere Mwanga II Mukasa, Kabaka of Buganda, who reigned from 1884 until 1888 and from 1889 until 1897, whose mother was Naabakyaala Abisaagi Baagal'ayaze.
- Kabaka Kiweewa Nnyonyintono, Kabaka of Buganda, who reigned between 11 September 1888 and 21 October 1888, whose mother was Kiribakka.
- Kabaka Kalema I Muguluma, Kabaka of Buganda, who reigned from 21 October 1888 until 5 October 1889, whose mother was Ndibuwakanyi.

== Legacy ==
In Ugandan historiography, Muteesa left a mixed legacy, with some regarding him as the most important of the kings of Buganda because of his vision and diplomatic skills, while others are more critical and believe he welcomed foreign influence that ultimately undermined Buganda's sovereignty.

The Catholic Church, alleged by Ugandan officials to have been somewhat reluctant to honor him in the years following his death, began to more fully recognize his religious contributions in the 21st century, after canonizing the Christian martyrs who died under the reign of his son. A Catholic museum in Muteesa's honor was under construction as of 2019.

"Under his rule Buganda was never seriously threatened, either with civil war or conquest. He became more powerful and more civilised. He allowed the missionaries to teach that it was possible to owe a higher allegiance than to their King, and while he lived their lives were safe. He had the strengths and subtlety to balance the Catholics, Protestants, Muslims and pagans, so that he controlled them all, just as he kept in touch with the rest of the world, but managed not to be swamped by it. If he turned inward at the end it was but a mild taste of what was to come." —Kabaka Mutesa II, Desecration of My Kingdom (1967)

== See also ==
- Banda Hill
- List of Kings of Buganda (Kabaka ne BaSsekabaka ba Buganda)
- Muteesa I Royal University
- Mapeera House

Preceded by Suuna II Kalema	King of Buganda; 1856–1884	Succeeded by Mwanga II Basammula Ekkere
