= Mwanga II of Buganda =

Kabaka of Buganda (1884–1888; 1889–1897)

Ssekabaka Danieri Basammula-Ekkere Mwanga II Mukasa
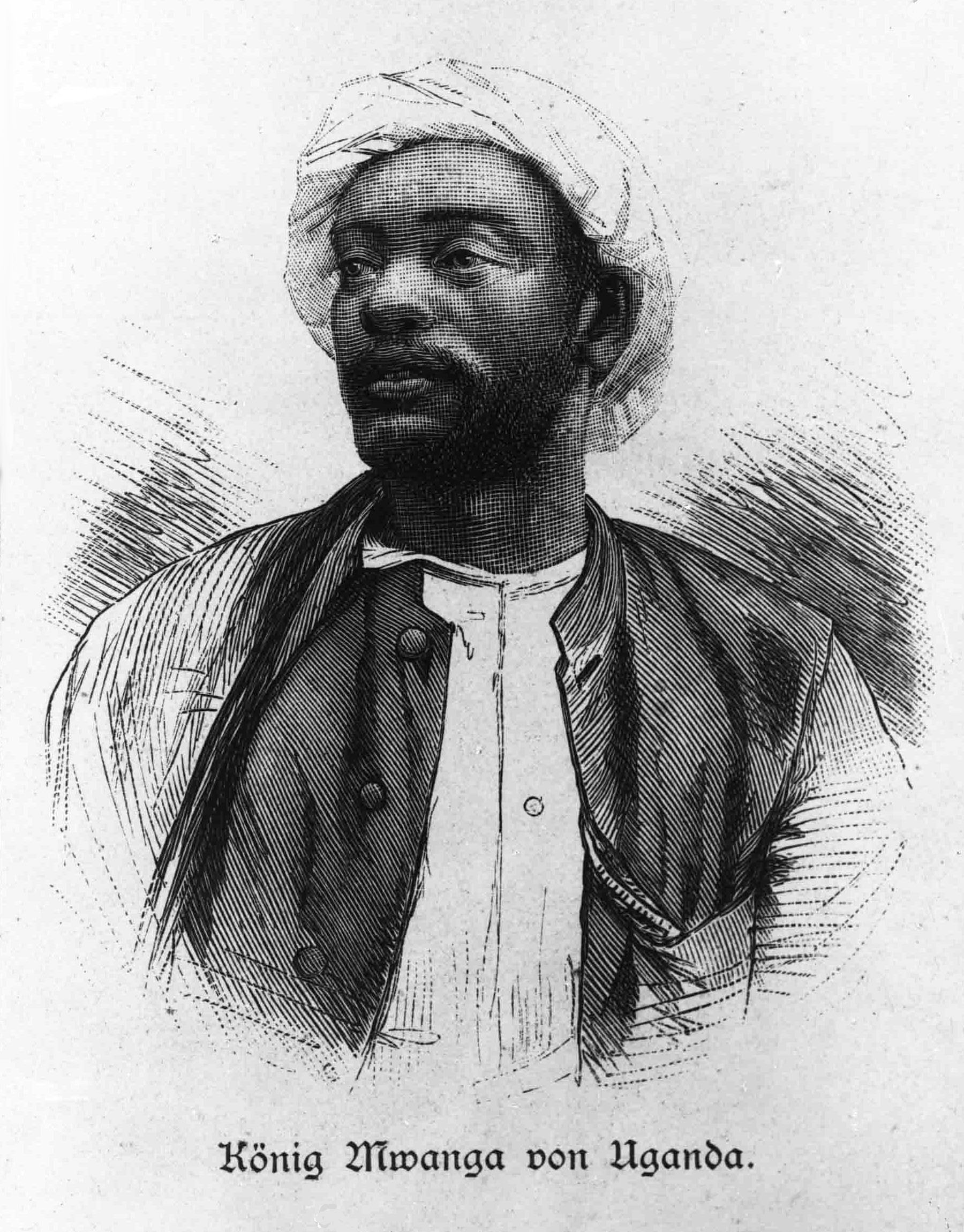

Kabaka of Buganda
- Reign: 1884–1888
- Predecessor: Muteesa I of Buganda
- Successor: Kiweewa of Buganda
- Reign: 1889–1897
- Predecessor: Kalema of Buganda
- Successor: Daudi Chwa II of Buganda
- Born: 3 June 1868; Nakawa
- Died: 8 May 1903 (aged 34); Victoria, Seychelles
- Burial: Kasubi Nabulagala
- Spouse: 1. Lady Damali Bayita Nanjobe; 2. Naabakyaala Dolosi Mwaan'omu, Bakazikubawa; 3. Lady Esiteri Nabunnya; 4. Naabakyaala Evalini Kulabako; 5. Naabakyaala Loyiroosa Nakibuuka Kaddulubaale; 6. Naabakyaala Samali Namuwanga Sabaddu; 7. Lady Nabweeteme; 8. Lady Oliver Evelyn Nakijoba Nabulya Kyebuuzibwa; 9. Beeza Batwegombya; 10. Naabakyaala Ntongo Kabejja; 11. Naabakyaala Nabisubi Omuwanga; 12. Lady Namirembe; Lady Laakeeri Mbekeka; 14. Lady Nalwooga, Omuyigiriza; 15. Lady Elizaabeti Buteba; 16. Lady Nattimba Binti Juma
- House: Abalasangeye dynasty
- Father: Muteesa I of Buganda
- Mother: Abakyala Abisagi Bagalayaze

Danieri Basammula-Ekkere Mwanga II Mukasa (3 June 1868 – 8 May 1903) was the Kabaka (King) of Buganda who ruled from 1884 to 1888 and again from 1889 to 1897. He is best known for his resistance to increasing British colonial influence and Christian missionary activities in Buganda Kingdom during the 19th century.

Known as Mwanga II, his reign was marked by political instabilities, internal conflicts, and tensions between traditional authorities and foreign religious and colonial forces. He is also associated with the persecution of Christian converts, some of whom later became known as the Martyrs of Uganda.

He was deposed in 1897 after being defeated by British forces and went into exile, where he died in 1903.

== Claim to the throne ==
He was born at Nakawa on 3 June 1868. His father was Muteesa I of Buganda, who reigned between 1856 and 1884. His mother was Abakyala Abisagi Bagalayaze, the 10th of his father's 85 wives. He ascended to the throne on 18 October 1884, after the death of his father. He established his capital on Mengo Hill.

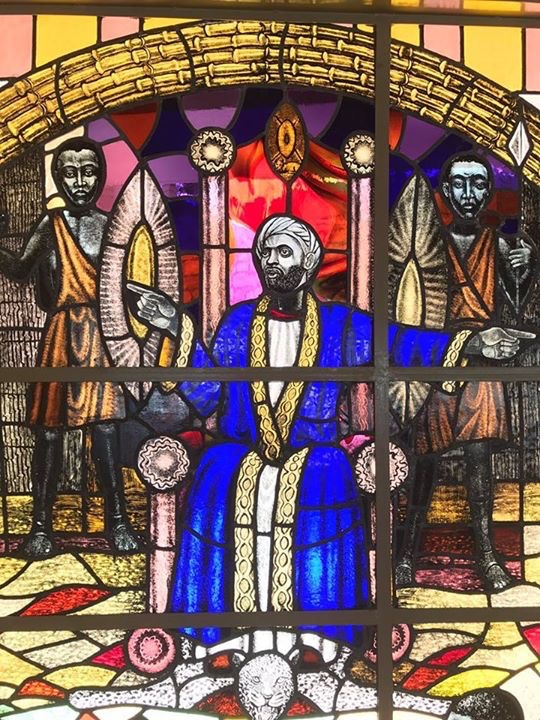
A stained glass depiction of Mwanga at the Munyonyo Martyrs' Shrine

== Reign ==
Mwanga came to the throne at the age of 16. He increasingly regarded the greatest threat to his rule as coming from the Christian missionaries who had gradually penetrated Buganda. His father had played-off the three religious traditions – Catholics, Protestants, and Muslims – against each other and thus had balanced the influence of the powers that were backing each group to extend their reach into Africa. Mwanga II took a much more aggressive approach.

On his orders, the Uganda Martyrs, a group of 22 Catholic and 23 Anglican converts to Christianity in the kingdom of Buganda, in Uganda, were executed between 31 January 1885 and 27 January 1887. The deaths took place at a time when there was a three-way religious struggle for political influence at the Buganda royal court. The episode also occurred against the backdrop of the "Scramble for Africa" – the invasion, occupation, division, colonization and annexation of African territory by European powers.

These murders and Mwanga's continued resistance alarmed the British, who backed a rebellion by Christian and Muslim groups who supported Mwanga's half brother and defeated Mwanga at Mengo in 1888. Mwanga's brother, Kiweewa Nnyonyintono, was elevated to the throne. He lasted exactly one month and was replaced on the throne by another brother, Kabaka Kalema Muguluma. However, Mwanga escaped and negotiated with the British. In exchange for handing over some of his sovereignty to the British East Africa Company, the British changed their backing to Mwanga, who swiftly removed Kalema from the throne in 1889. Mwanga later converted to Christianity and was baptized as a Protestant.

== Final years ==
On 26 December 1890, Mwanga signed a treaty with Lord Lugard, granting certain powers over revenue, trade and the administration of justice to the Imperial British East Africa Company. These powers were transferred to the British Crown on 1 April 1893. On 27 August 1894, Mwanga accepted Buganda becoming a British protectorate, but on 6 July 1897, he declared war on the British. Defeated on 20 July 1897 by British-led forces at Buddu (in modern-day Masaka District), he fled into German East Africa where he was arrested and interned by German colonial authorities at Bukoba.

Mwanga was deposed by British colonial authorities in absentia on 9 August 1897. However, he eventually escaped from German custody and returned to Buganda with a rebel army, but was again defeated by the British on 15 January 1898. Mwanga was captured and in April 1899 was exiled to the Seychelles. While in exile, he was received into the Anglican Church and was given the name Danieri (Daniel). Mwanga spent the rest of his life in exile and died in the Seychelles on 8 May 1903 at the age of 34 or 35. On 2 August 1910, his remains were repatriated and buried at the Kasubi Tombs.

== Married life ==
Mwanga is on record as having married 17 wives:

1. Damali Bayita Nanjobe
2. Naabakyaala Dolosi Mwaan'omu Bakazikubawa
3. Esiteri Nabunnya
4. Naabakyaala Eveliini Kulabako, Omubikka
5. Naabakyaala Loyiroosa Nakibuuka, Kaddulubaale
6. Naabakyaala Samali Namuwanga, Sabaddu
7. Nabweteme
8. Nakijoba Nabulya (Elizabeeti Oliva Kyebuzibwa born of Mwanje Bikaali)
9. Bezza Batwegombya
10. Naabakyaala Ntongo, Kabejja
11. Naabakyaala Nabisubi, Omuwanga
12. Namirembe
13. Lakeeri Mbekeka
14. Nalwooga, Omuyigiriza
15. Elizaabeeti Buteba
16. Nattimba Binti Juma
17. Amalemba Tutsi

=== Other relationships ===
Mwanga II engaged in sexual relationships with men, including some of the Uganda martyrs, who were his servants. Supposedly, when the Uganda martyrs converted to Christianity and refused his advances, he ordered the killing of converts. Western colonists then used homophobia to claim that Christian Baganda were against his same-sex activities.

According to Sylvia Tamale, it was an "open secret" in Buganda that Mwanga was "gay".

== Issue ==
Mwanga II fathered several sons and daughters from his 16 wives including Daudi Chwa II of Buganda:

1. Prince (Omulangira) Kagolo, whose mother was Damali Bayita Nanjobe. He was killed by his uncle Kalema, in 1889.
2. Prince (Omulangira) Mulindwa, whose mother was Nabweteme
3. Prince (Omulangira) Nganda, whose mother was Lakeeri Mbekeka
4. Prince (Omulangira) Abdallah Mawanda whose mother was Lakeeri Mbekeka. Perceived as a potential agitator during the reign of Chwa, he was appointed as one of the British Agents to Kigezi in South Western Uganda.
5. Daudi Chwa II of Buganda, who reigned from 1897 until 1939. His mother was Eveliini Kulabako.
6. Prince (Omulangira) Yusuufu Suuna Kiweewa, whose mother was Esiteri Nabunnya. He was born at Mengo, Uganda on 16 February 1898 and was educated at Mengo High School and King's College Budo. Commissioned 2nd Lieutenant in October 1914. He served in the Great War from 1915 until 1919. Promoted to Lieutenant in the 7th Territorial Battalion on 25 May 1939. He served in the Second World War in Eastern Africa and in North Africa, from 1939 until 1940. Retired on 18 March 1940. He was implicated in the Buganda riots of 1949 and exiled to the Ssese Islands, where he died in 1949.
7. Prince (Omulangira) Tobi, whose mother was Nabisubi
8. Prince (Omulangira) Nayime?, whose mother was Loyiroosa Nakibuuka
9. Princess (Omumbejja) Najjuma Katebe, whose mother is not mentioned
10. Princess (Omumbejja) Anna Nambi Nassolo, whose mother was Samali Namuwanga
11. Princess (Omumbejja) Mboni Maliamu Kajja-Obunaku, whose mother was Nattimba. She was educated at Saint Monica's School in Zanzibar.

== Quotes ==
"I do not want to give them my land. I want all Europeans of all nations to come to Buganda, to build and to trade as they like."

- Mwanga's message to Euan Smith, British Consul in Zanzibar, 1890

"I am Mutesa's son, and what Mutesa was in Buganda that I will also be, and against those who will not have it so I shall make war."

- Mwanga to Karl Peters, 1890

"The English have come; they have built a fort; they eat my land; they have made me sign a treaty; they curtail my powers; and I get nothing from them in return."

- Mwanga after signing treaty with Captain Frederick Lugard, 1890

"Abalangira Ttimba, buli afuluma amira munne." [Princes are like pythons, they swallow (usurp) each other.]

- Mwanga after defeating the Muslim faction, 1893

"When I die it will be the end of the kingdom of Buganda. Europeans will take over (eat) this country of mine."

- Mwanga before joining forces with Kabalega, 1898

=== Quotes about Mwanga II ===
"To his (Mwanga's) distorted view the missionaries were men banded together for the undermining of his authority, for sapping the affections and loyalty of his subjects and for ultimately occupying the whole of Buganda."

- Henry Morton Stanley, In Darkest Africa, 1890

"... there was, however, much good feeling and even tenderness in his character when he could be kept from bad habits and was free from evil influences."

- John Roscoe, Twenty Five Years in East Africa, 1921

"Mwanga was a jovial, friendly person who had many friends."

- Batolomewo Zimbe, Buganda ne Kabaka, 1939, p. 53.

"Mwanga fought to free himself and his country of the intruders for all his reign. He did not like or want them; he was impressed by their power, but not interested in their ideas. He could not recover the old way of life nor adapt himself to the new, and in his perplexed and unhappy groping in the gap between he seems to me to deserve some sympathy."

- Kabaka Mutesa II, Desecration of My Kingdom, 1967

"He had wanted to be master in his own house, but unfortunately for him and for the monarchy, chieftainship triumphed over royal authority in a manner that had never happened before."

- MSM Kiwanuka, "Kabaka Mwanga and His Political Parties", 1969

"When Mwanga was brought to the capital as a captive the administration expected the people to be happy now that the enemy of their peace and religion was going into exile. On the contrary, people wanted him pardoned."

- Fr. John-Mary Waliggo, The Catholic Church in Buddu, 1976

"Mwanga ... was demonstrably unequal to the task of controlling the foreigners who were subverting his kingdom under his very nose. He did not have the experience or the prestige that had enabled his father to keep foreigners in their place within his kingdom."

- Samwiri R. Karugire, A Political History of Uganda, 1980

"Mwanga was quite right to seek to be the master in his own kingdom just as his forefathers had been, all his excesses and fault of character notwithstanding. Some of his predecessors had been guilty of worse acts of cruelty and injustice and nothing drastic had befallen them. In other words even if all the charges levelled against Mwanga by his numerous Christian and Muslim detractors were true, he was still right to claim supreme authority in the kingdom of his forefathers."

- Samwiri R. Karugire, A Political History of Uganda, 1980

"... Mwanga struck them (Ganda elders) as being kinder and gentler than Mutesa had been while a youth. For sheer tyranny, Mwanga II was easily outclassed by his father, grandfather and great grandfather, each of whom was remembered in Ganda tradition at the time of the British colonial take-over as having become uncontrollable at some stage during their respective reigns. This is something Mwanga never became."

- Morris Twaddle, Kakungulu, 1993

"No Kabaka of Buganda had ever faced the challenges that Mwanga faced, dealing with mighty religious parties which eventually drove him from the throne and his kingdom."

- Samwiri Lwanga Lunyigo, Mwanga II, 2011, page 4

"Mwanga II should be judged within the context of nineteenth century Buganda, where kings had absolute executive, legislative, judicial, military and even economic power. To see him through the lenses of his foes, those who took away the sovereignty of his country and their local collaborators is to miss him. He cannot be understood through the fairy tales of his enemies who denounced him."

- Samwiri Lwanga Lunyigo, Mwanga II, 2011, p. 35

== Social media trend ==
In early 2023, a social media trend emerged in Uganda and worldwide, featuring the name 'Kabaka-Mwanga.' The trend originated from a video shared on Ugandan social media platforms, in which a young boy from the suburbs of Uganda used the phrase as an exclamatory statement. This trend sparked renewed interest in the historical figure of Mwanga. The phenomenon captured the attention of both older Ugandans familiar with Mwanga's legacy and younger generations who were previously unaware of him.

== See also ==
- Kabaka of Buganda
- Uganda Martyrs
- Muteesa I of Buganda
- Kimera of Buganda

Preceded by Muteesa I Mukaabya Walugembe	Kabaka of Buganda; 1884–88	Succeeded by Kiweewa Nnyonyintono

Preceded by Kalema Muguluma	Kabaka of Buganda; 1889–97	Succeeded by Daudi Cwa II of Buganda
