= Kiweewa of Buganda =

Ssekabaka Mutebi Nnyonyintono Kiweewa

Kabaka of Buganda
- Reign: 2 August 1888 – 21 October 1888
- Predecessor: Mwanga II of Buganda
- Successor: Kalema of Buganda
- Born: Prior to 1856; Nakatema
- Died: 1889
- Burial: Masanafu, Kyaddondo
- Spouse: 1. Lady Bukirwa Nassaza; 2. Lady Butema; 3. Lady Kajja; 4. Lady Lozaliya; 5. Lady Luleba, Omusenero; 6. Lady Namubiru; 7. Lady Balirwa; 8. Lady Namuli, Omufumbiro; 9. Naabakyaala Namusoke, Kaddulubaale; 10. Lady Nambajjwe; 11. Lady Nambi I 12. Lady Nambi II; 13. Lady Nambi III; 14. Lady Tebalyayeebwa, Omulindamazzi; 15. Lady Teyansigira; 16. Lady Lwandeeta; 17. Naabakyaala Zandaba, the Namasole, previously the Kaddulubaale; 18. Naabakyaala Mbagumidde, the Kabejja; 19. Lady Bwangu; 20. Lady Sabaddu
- Father: Muteesa I of Buganda
- Mother: Namasole Kiribakka

Mutebi Nnyonyintono Kiweewa was the 32nd Kabaka of the Kingdom of Buganda from 2 August 1888 until 21 October 1888.

== Claim to the throne ==
Kiweewa himself was a tall, thin man with a very dark skin which was heavily poxed. He was fairly advanced in age, completely devoid of political ambition and without any quality of leadership. The only good thing about him was that he was kind-hearted but conservative.

— MSM Kiwanuka.

He was born at Nakatema prior to 1856, the eldest son of Kabaka Mukaabya Walugembe Mutesa I Kayiira, Kabaka of Buganda, who reigned between 1856 and 1884. His mother was Kiribakka of the Mamba clan. He ascended to the throne following the defeat of his younger brother, Kabaka Mwanga II by the combined Christian, Muslim and rebel Baganda forces. The defeat of Mwanga II occurred on 2 August 1888. Kiweewa was crowned on 11 September 1888. He maintained his capital at Mengo Hill.

== Married life ==
He is recorded to have married twenty (20) wives:

1. Lady Bukirwa Nassaza
2. Lady Butema
3. Lady Kajja
4. Lady Lozaliya
5. Lady Luleba, Omusenero
6. Lady Namubiru
7. Lady Balirwa
8. Lady Namuli, Omufumbiro
9. Naabakyaala Namusoke, Kaddulubaale
10. Lady Nambajjwe
11. Lady Nambi I
12. Lady Nambi II
13. Lady Nambi III
14. Lady Tebalyayeebwa, Omulindamazzi
15. Lady Teyansigira
16. Lady Lwandeeta
17. Naabakyaala Zandaba, the Namasole, previously the Kaddulubaale
18. Naabakyaala Mbagumidde, the Kabejja
19. Lady Bwangu
20. Lady Sabaddu

== Issue ==
He fathered 23 children, 21 sons and two daughters:

1. Prince Kiweewa Ssimbwa, whose mother was Lady Butema
2. Prince (Omulangira) Walulyo I, whose mother was Lady Butema
3. Prince (Omulangira) Kibuuka, whose mother was Lady Kajja
4. Prince (Omulangira) Nabadda, whose mother was Lady Lozaliya
5. Prince (Omulangira) Muyinda, whose mother was Lady Luleba, Omusenero
6. Prince (Omulangira) Agustin [Gusito] Tebandeke, whose mother was Lady Namubiru. He was educated at Namilyango College.
7. Prince (Omulangira) Lulaba, whose mother was Lady Namuli
8. Prince (Omulangira) Kagunya, whose mother was Lady Namuli
9. Prince (Omulangira) Lukongwa, the Ssaabalangira (Chief Prince), whose mother was Lady Namusoke
10. Prince (Omulangira) Kiwanuka, whose mother was Lady Namusoke
11. Prince (Omulangira) Walulyo II, whose mother was Lady Namusoke
12. Prince (Omulangira) Kalubagwiire, whose mother was Lady Nambajjwe
13. Prince (Omulangira) Sekamaanya, whose mother was Lady Nambi I
14. Prince (Omulangira) Namulinzi I, whose mother was Lady Nambi II
15. Prince (Omulangira) Mwanga, whose mother was Lady Nambi III
16. Prince (Omulangira) Chwa, whose mother was Tebalyayeebwa
17. Prince (Omulangira) Ngenza, whose mother was Tebalyayeebwa
18. Prince (Omulangira) Namulinzi II, whose mother was Teyansigira
19. Prince (Omulangira) Namika, whose mother was Lady Lwandeeta
20. Prince (Omulangira) Musisi, whose mother was Lwandeeta
21. Prince (Omulangira) Nasuswa, whose mother was Lady Zandaba
22. Princess (Omumbejja) Hana Mazzi, whose mother was Balirwa
23. Princess (Omumbejja) Agaati Kagere, whose mother Tebalyayeebwa

== His reign ==
Kabaka Kiweewa Nnyonyintono's rein is the shortest in the recorded history of Buganda. He was the Kabaka-in-waiting for around six weeks; after he was crowned, he lasted a mere forty days on the throne. His reign was characterized by conflict and rebellion among the members of the royal court and intrigue and plotting among the Arabic Muslim and European Christian forces that supported the warring factions.

Some of the great officers of state during his reign included;

Name	Position	Translation
Honorat Nyonyintono	Katikiro	Chief Minister
Ali Bukulu	Kimbugwe	Second Minister
Honorat Nyonyintono	Sekibobo	Governor of Kyaggwe
Apollo Kaggwa	Mukwenda	Governor of Singo
Muguluma	Pokino	Governor of Buddu
Kapalaga	Kaggo	Governor of Kyadondo
Gaburieli Kintu	Kangao	Governor of Bulemezi
Luganga	Omujasi	Head of Ekitongole Ekijasi
Samuel Mukasa	Omuwanika	Head of Ekitongole Ggwanika

Kiweewa's reforms included lifting the ban on Arab trade with Bunyoro, as well as reducing the payment his predecessors had imposed on export and import of merchandise. he undertook to repay the ivory debt Mwanga owed the Arab traders. In a meeting he held with the European missionaries and the Muslims, Kiweewa promised to build a mosque for the Muslims. However, his announcement that none of his subjects should be interfered with on the grounds of his religion was not heeded, and the Muslim party upon gaining power pressed for his circumcision and conversion to their faith.

== The final days ==
He was deposed by the Muslim forces of his brother Kabaka Kalema, who reigned from 21 October 1888 until 5 October 1889. He was captured and thrown in jail. He was killed in prison by his Muslim captors in July 1889. He was buried at Masanafu, Kyaddondo.

== Quotes ==
"Like Vitellius, eight hundred years before, he had never wished to rule, and like Vitellius also, when he saw that they were resolved to kill him, he appealled in vain to his slayers not to put to death the man once they had made a ruler over them."

- Sir John M. Gray, "The Year of the Three Kings of Buganda", 1950

"Kiweewa himself was a tall, thin man with a very dark skin which was heavily poxed. He was fairly advanced in age, completely devoid of political ambition and without any quality of leadership. The only good thing about him was that he was kind-hearted but conservative."

- MSM Kiwanuka, "Kabaka Mwanga and his Political Parties", 1969

"When he ascended the throne Kiweewa was of the view that he would be the supreme authority in the land of Buganda just as his predecessors had been. But soon Kiweewa discovered that he was no more than a puppet in the hands of his officers and ministers."

- A. Mutyaba, The Muslim Factor in Uganda, 1840-1900

== See also ==
- Kabaka of Buganda

Preceded by Mwanga II Mukaabya	King of Buganda; 1888	Succeeded by Kalema Muguluma
