= Charles Chaillé-Long =

American soldier, lawyer, explorer, diplomat, author (1842–1917)

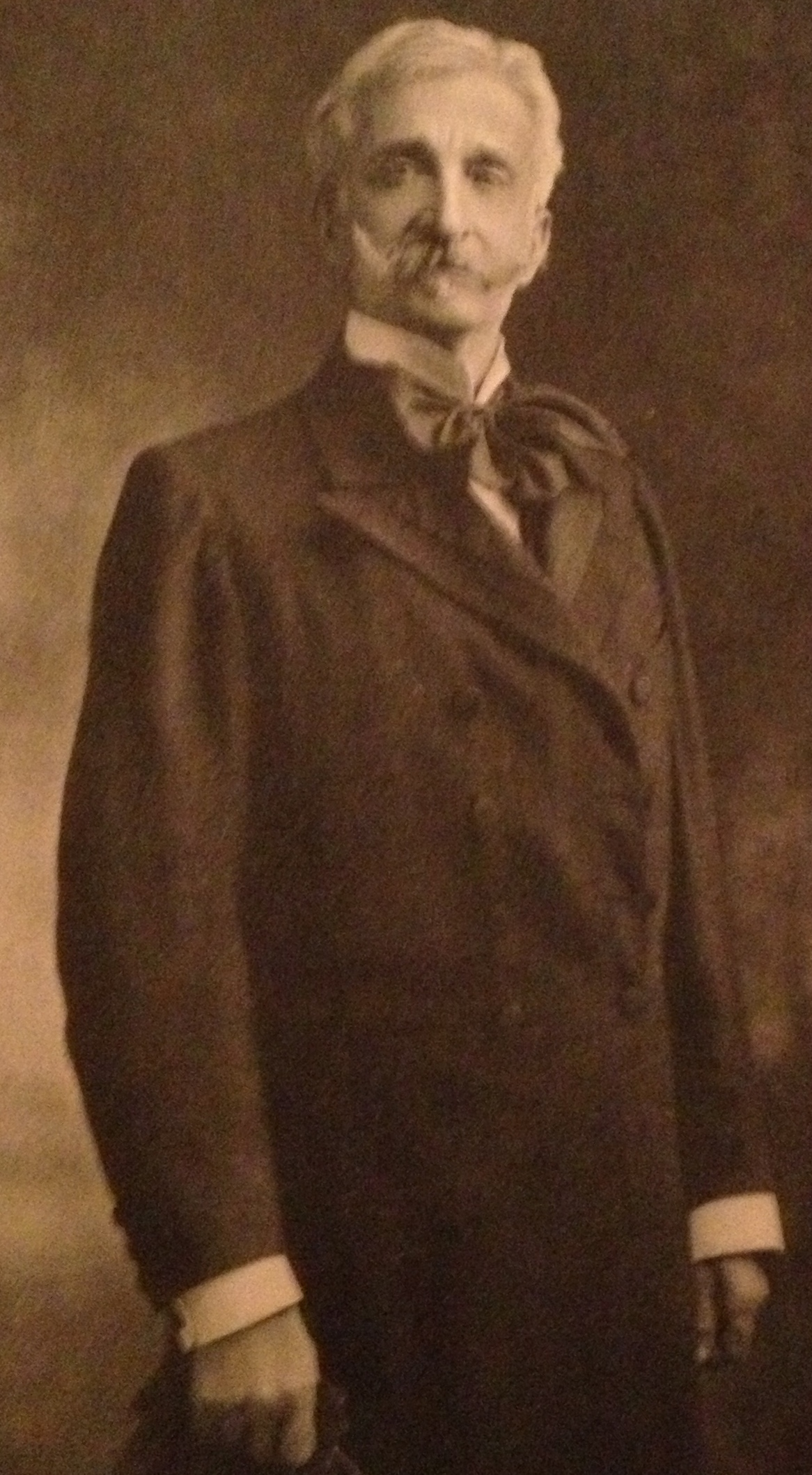
- Born: July 2, 1842; Princess Anne, Maryland
- Died: March 24, 1917 (aged 74); Virginia Beach, Virginia
- Burial place: Arlington National Cemetery

Charles Chaillé-Long (1842–1917) was an American soldier, lawyer, explorer, diplomat, and author from Princess Anne, Maryland. He was commissioned by the United States Army and the Egyptian Army. He explored Central Africa and Korea (Corea). He was the second westerner to visit Lake Victoria and given a medal for being the first American to document a visit to Lake Kyoga (aka Lake Ibrahim) and establishing it as a source of the Nile River.

== United States military service ==
He fought in the Union Army during the American Civil War, taking part in the Battle of Gettysburg. He enlisted as a private, and finished the war with the rank of captain.

== Service in Africa ==
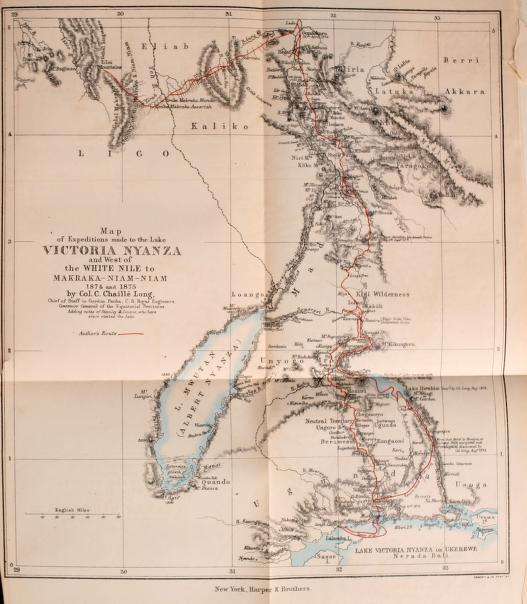
Central Africa by Charles Challié-Long

After the Civil War, about 50 veterans from both sides of the war were asked to serve in Egypt. He took a commission as lieutenant-colonel in the Egyptian Army in 1869, arriving in Egypt in 1870. In 1874, serving under Charles Gordon in the southern Sudan, he travelled south to present-day Uganda, signing a treaty with Muteesa I of Buganda. In 1874 he was the second western explorer of Lake Victoria, and the first known American to visit Lake Kyoga. While on his return journey, he was attacked by the forces of Bunyoro. Further missions of exploration were to the Azande in 1875, and the Jubba River in Somalia in 1876. In 1875, he commanded Egyptian forces in the McKillop expedition, to the Indian Ocean coast.

He wrote a book on his adventures called Central Africa: Naked Truths of Naked People.

== Post-military service ==
He resigned his commission in 1877, returned to the United States, and attended Columbia Law School. He graduated Columbia in 1880. He became a lawyer of international law and taught in Paris. In 1881, at the beginning of the Mahdist War, he was placed in charge of the American consulate in Alexandria, Egypt. He opened the consulate to refugees of other nations, and was credited with saving numerous lives as a result.

Chaillé-Long was also a writer. His 1884 book, The Three Prophets, took a very negative line on Charles Gordon. His comments were later taken up by revisionist writers, notably Lytton Strachey in Eminent Victorians. Critics have attacked Chaillé-Long for a lack of accuracy as an author. He also wrote, among other works, My Life in Four Continents.

In 1887, President Grover Cleveland appointed him consul general and secretary for the delegation to Korea.

Beginning in 1890, he spent about eight years in Egypt, writing and exploring.

After returning to the United States, he served as secretary for the Universal Postal Congress prior to becoming the secretary for the United States commission at the Paris Exposition in 1900.

Chaillé-Long died March 24, 1917, in Virginia Beach, Virginia, and was buried in Arlington National Cemetery. His wife, Mary Amelia (née Hammond) Chaillé-Long, was the daughter of New York State Congressman John Hammond.

== Recognition ==
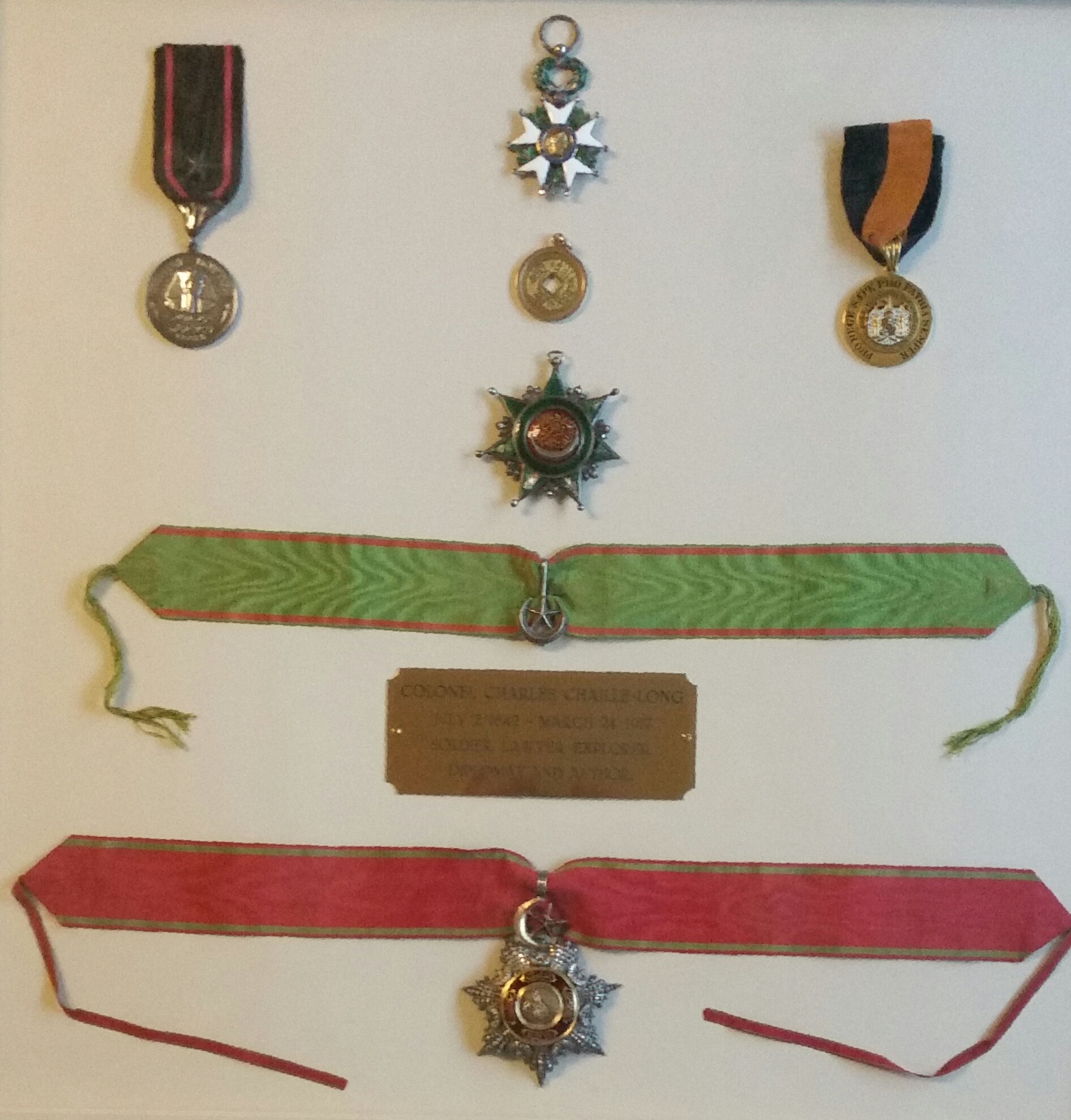
Charles Chaillé Long's Medals

He was awarded the Charles P. Daly Medal by the American Geographical Society in 1909 with the inscription "Awarded in MCMIX to Charles Chaillé-Long in recognition of valuable additions to geographical knowledge made by him in Africa. In 1874 he explored the unknown Nile north of Urondogan, discovered Lake Ibrahim and supplied the final evidence needed to prove that the river issuing from Victoria Nyanza is the Nile."

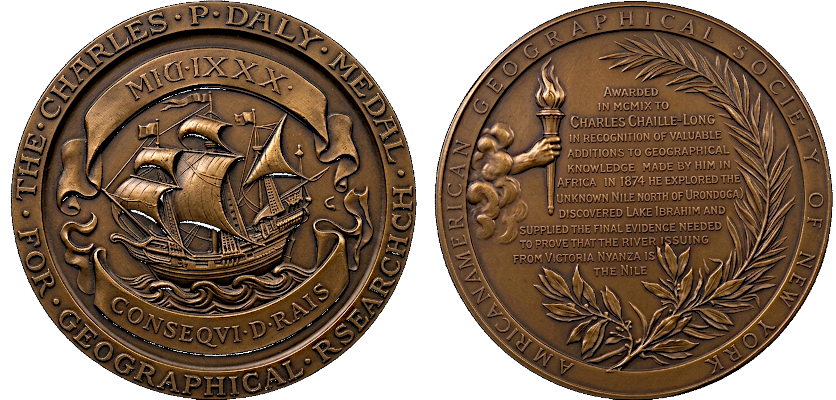
He was also awarded a Cross Medjidieh and a Cross Osmanieh from his service in Egypt, the Cross of Chevalier of The Légion d'honneur (France), a Gold Medal from the General Assembly of Maryland, and two yet to be identified medals from Egypt and Korea.

== Works ==
- Central Africa: Naked Truths of Naked People (1876)
- L'Afrique Centrale; expéditions an lae Victoria-Nyanza et an Makrakaniam niam (1877)
- The Three Prophets (1884)
- Les Sources du Nil (1891)
- L'Égypte et ses provinces perdues (1892)
- La Corée ou Tschösen La Terre du Calme Matinal (1894)
- Les Combattants Francais de la Guerre
- My Life in Four Continents (1912)
