= Oskar Spate =

London-born geographer (1911 – 2000)

Oskar Hermann Khristian Spate
- Born: 30 March 1911; London
- Died: 29 May 2000 (aged 89); Canberra
- Occupation: geographer
- Awards: Charles P. Daly Medal (1968)

Oskar Hermann Khristian Spate (30 March 1911 – 29 May 2000) was a London-born geographer best known for his role in strengthening geography as a discipline in Australia and the Pacific.

== Early life ==
Spate was born to a German father and an English mother in the Bloomsbury district of London, England. During the First World War, his father was interned as a German national and Spate fled to Iowa in the United States. He returned to England in 1919, where he developed an early interest in geography and history. He went on to study at St Catharine's College, Cambridge, in the 1930s. It was during this period that many of Spate's characteristic personality traits revealed themselves: he studied both English as well as Geography, thus cementing a deeply humanistic tendency that would become obvious in his future thinking. His irreverence and sense of humor was also manifest as well – he joined a Communist cell but was thrown out for his frivolity. He was later to claim that he could be 'solemn but not serious'. His doctoral dissertation was on the historical geography of London from 1801 to 1851.

== Career ==
Spate's dissertation was admired, but his strong political beliefs made an academic career in England unlikely. After a year as a tutor in Reading, he took up a position at the University of Rangoon in Myanmar (then Burma) in 1937. There he became interested in the colonial struggle for independence, and produced a steady stream of high-quality work on the geography of Myanmar. When World War II broke out, Spate joined he army as a volunteer and was seriously injured in the first Japanese raid on the Rangoon airport. He was evacuated to India, where he recuperated, wrote poetry, and served in the unusual capacity of a military censor. In 1944, he moved to the Inter-Service Topographical Department in New Delhi (and later Kandy, Sri Lanka) where he was a major in charge of the section of the office dealing with Burma.

In 1947, Spate returned to England, where he served briefly as a lecturer at the Bedford College for Women, which was part of the University of London before taking up a permanent position at the London School of Economics. Spate appeared to have achieved a comfortable and prestigious academic position as a specialist in South Asian geography – it was during this time he was involved in the creation of the book The Changing Face of Asia and served on the Punjab Boundary Commission that was involved in the partition of Pakistan from India. However, Spate left England in 1951 to become the Foundation Professor of Geography in the Research School of Pacific (and Asian) Studies at the newly established Australian National University. Spate was given carte blanche to organize the department and train students, and ended up having a large impact on geography as a discipline in Australia. In 1954, his work India and Pakistan: A General and Regional Geography was released to wide acclaim as one of the most magisterial and complete geographies of the country. Firmly established as an expert in South Asia, Spate turned his attention to Australia and the Pacific more broadly.

In 1953, Spate became an advisor to the Australian Minister for Territories, for whom he produced important papers on the economy and demography of Papua New Guinea and Fiji. His 1959 report on The Fijian People was particularly notable, because it became the document that guided how colonial administers handled the process of Fiji's independence. In 1969, he served on the commission that recommended the creation of the University of Papua New Guinea. By the 1960s, the discipline of geography was growing more quantitative. Spate's more humanistic tendencies made him uncomfortable with these trends and in 1967 he was appointed Director of the Research School of Pacific (and Asian) Studies, Australian National University, a more administrative position which allowed him to avoid entanglement in disciplinary debates. He served in this capacity until his retirement in 1972, when he took up a position in the Department of Pacific History. He retired in 1976 and began writing his master work, a monumental three-volume history of the Pacific, The Spanish Lake: The Pacific Since Magellan. He died in 2000 at the age of 89.

== Articles ==
- "Marcel Aurousseau, 1891-1983" (PDF). Proceedings of the Australian Academy of the Humanities. 12 (1982–83): 110–112. Archived from the original (PDF) on 15 September 2009.

== Sources ==
- Oskar H. K. Spate (obituary) by David Hooson, Geographical Review, Oct 2000, Vol. 90, Issue 4.
- Oskar Spate: a personal impression by T.M. Perry. In Jennings, J.N. and Linge, G.J.R., Of Time and Place: essays in honour of OHK Spate, Canberra, 1980, pp. xiii-xix.
- Oskar Hermann Khristian Spate, 1911-2000 (obituary) by Peter J Rimmer. In Annual Report of the Australian Academy of the Social Sciences 2000, pp. 82–85.
- Finding Guide to the Papers of O.H.K Spate (deposited at the National Library of Australia)
