= Edward John Baxter =

English medical missionary doctor

- Born: 22 June 1853; Norwood Green, Middlesex, England
- Died: 5 November 1939 (aged 86); Hove, East Sussex, England
- Education: Licentiate of the Royal College of Physicians of Edinburgh
- Spouse: Clara Elizabeth Worsley
- Children: 1
- Medical career
- Profession: Medical missionary

Edward John Baxter (22 June 1853 – 5 November 1939) was an English medical missionary doctor from the Church Mission Society who founded the medical station in Mpwapwa which became the current St Luke's Health Clinic in Tanzania. Baxter practiced in East Africa, Uganda, Mochi, Chaga, Mengo, and Mpwapwa. His work preceded colonisation of the area as German East Africa or Tanganyika Territory. As a pre-colonising, "pioneering missionary" for the CMS, former close relationships with the Maasai. Baxter led subsequent missionaries from Mombassa inland, including the first 'lady missionaries' party to Uganda in 1895.

Baxter was also known for supporting the Belgian Expedition and received notable marks from King Leopold.

== Education and personal life ==
In 1877, Edward Baxter attended Edinburgh University and School of Medicine (Licentiate of the Royal College of Physicians and Surgeons). This was just before his first mission to Mpwapwa. Edward Baxter was born on 22 June 1853 in Norwood Green, Middlesex. Baxter was the son of Henry Phelps Baxter of Middlesex England. His sister, Alice Mary Baxter, worked at the Mpwapwa mission. Baxter, himself, married Clara Elizabeth Worsley in Ealing on 9 January 1884. Worsley helped Baxter with his settlement in Mpwapwa and supported him in his missions. She died on 2 October 1935 in Coronado, California. Edward Baxter lost an infant child to disease in Africa in 1885. On 2 May 1888 Baxter and Worsley had a daughter by the name of Beatrice Mary (Nash).

== Career ==
Baxter was called to East Africa following an appeal by Sir Henry Stanley in 1877 in response to Stanley's First Africa Expedition. Baxter aimed to spread Christianity to the people he encountered on his missions. In 1892, Baxter - who was based in the Gogo area at the time - visited Moshi, where Chief Mandara professed that he believed in Christ.

Baxter travelled to many different locations in East Africa, including Mochi, Chaga, and Mengo, to provide care to people. His first settlement was located in Mpwapwa, a town in Tanzania. Baxter, with his spouse Womsley, with Henry Cole, a lay missionary, and his second spouse Alice Mary Baxter, opened the station at Mpwapwa in 1879. Cole focused on the administrative aspects while Baxter built the clinical program.

In February 1879, Baxter planned to form a station in Ugogo. With the help of his men, he found a habitable area, however, water could only be accessed via spring. Additionally, due to an infestation of the Tsetse fly, sheep and oxen were not able to survive, preventing the men from accessing necessary supplies. Baxter proposed that a station be formed at Mausassa instead, as it was much more suitable. Baxter and his people learned about tribes, such as the Wagogo, in the surrounding areas. Baxter provided the local people with blue stone (copper (II) sulfate), a material which can be used to kill viruses and bacteria and cure various disorders.

Baxter's colleague, Joseph Thomas Last, brought approximately fifty freed slaves from Mombasa to perform paid work on the settlement. Baxter was seen as "more and more as a great medicine-man." Throughout Baxter's time at Mpwapwa, escaped slaves continued to join his station. He provided them work on the farm for housing and food.

On March 21, a letter from Major-General Gardiner expressing the gratitude of the King of the Belgiums–Leopold II of Belgium–during the Belgian Antarctic Expedition. Baxter nursed back to health one of the member of the Belgian Expedition who had fallen ill. King Leopold provided his thanks at the Marlborough House and expressed much interest in the society's plans for the Mpwapwa station.

Baxter left the African continent and returned to England 30 August 1912. He resigned from the CMS 20 May 1913.

== Legacy ==
Baxter's station in Mpwapwa eventually gave rise to St Luke's Clinic, which was a maternity clinic established as early as 1878. This hospital was closed in the 1950s. In 1993, Rachel Tarling reopened the St Luke's Health Center in the Old Bishop's Rest House within the Cathedral Multi-purpose Complex.

On 5 November 1939 Edward John Baxter died in Hove, England.
