= Odoi =

Odoi is a Ghanaian surname that may refer to the following notable people:

- Bradley Hudson-Odoi (born 1988), Ghanaian football striker
- Callum Hudson-Odoi (born 2000), English football winger
- Chris Odoi-Atsem (born 1995), American soccer player
- Denis Odoi (born 1988), Ghananian-Belgian football player
- Fox Odoi-Oywelowo, Ugandan advocate and legislator
- Frank Odoi (disambiguation), multiple people
- George Commey Mills-Odoi (1916–1988), Ghanaian lawyer and judge
- Nii Odoi Mensah (died 2016), Ghanaian actor
- Samuel Odoi-Sykes, Ghanaian politician, diplomat and lawyer

== See also ==
- Miyake Odoi Site in Japan
