= Sexual Offences Bill, 2019 =

2019 bill in Uganda

Parliament of Uganda
- Territorial extent: Uganda
- Passed by: Parliament of Uganda
- Passed: 5 May 2021
- Vetoed by: President Yoweri Museveni
- Vetoed: 18 August 2021
- Introduced by: Monicah Amoding (NRM)
- Status: Vetoed

The Sexual Offences Bill, 2019 was a bill in Uganda that consolidated a number of previous laws regarding sexual offences, introduced some provisions toward addressing sexual violence, and criminalised same-sex relationships. The bill was passed by the Parliament of Uganda on 5 May 2021, but was vetoed by President Yoweri Museveni on 18 August 2021.

== Legislative history ==
The bill was introduced by Kumi District Woman Representative Monicah Amoding in 2015, the year after the Anti-Homosexuality Act, 2014 was signed into law but subsequently struck down by the Constitutional Court of Uganda on procedural grounds. Amoding's bill then spent four years under review by the Committee on Legal and Parliamentary Affairs before returning to Parliament in February 2019. A number of amendments were then proposed during parliamentary debates, among others an amendment that would've made consent required for sexual acts but that failed to gain majority support.

It was passed by the Parliament of Uganda in early May 2021. In August 2021, President Yoweri Museveni vetoed it, suggesting much of its content is already covered by existing legislation and sending it back to Parliament to address these redundancies. Museveni reportedly also had concerns about foreign policy implications and democratic buy-in and felt it was not politically advantageous to sign it as he had already recently won re-election.

== Reception ==
Human Rights Watch called on the Ugandan president to veto the law, stating that "Ugandan lawmakers should focus on ending endemic sexual violence rather than seeing this as an opportunity to imbed abusive provisions that criminalize the sex lives of consenting adults." Concerns have also been raised about the impact the bill would have on the HIV/AIDS epidemic in Uganda.

== See also ==
- Anti-Homosexuality Act, 2014
- Anti-Homosexuality Bill, 2023
- LGBT rights in Uganda
- LGBT history in Uganda
