= Janepher Mbabazi Kyomuhendo =

Ugandan accountant and politician (born 1979)

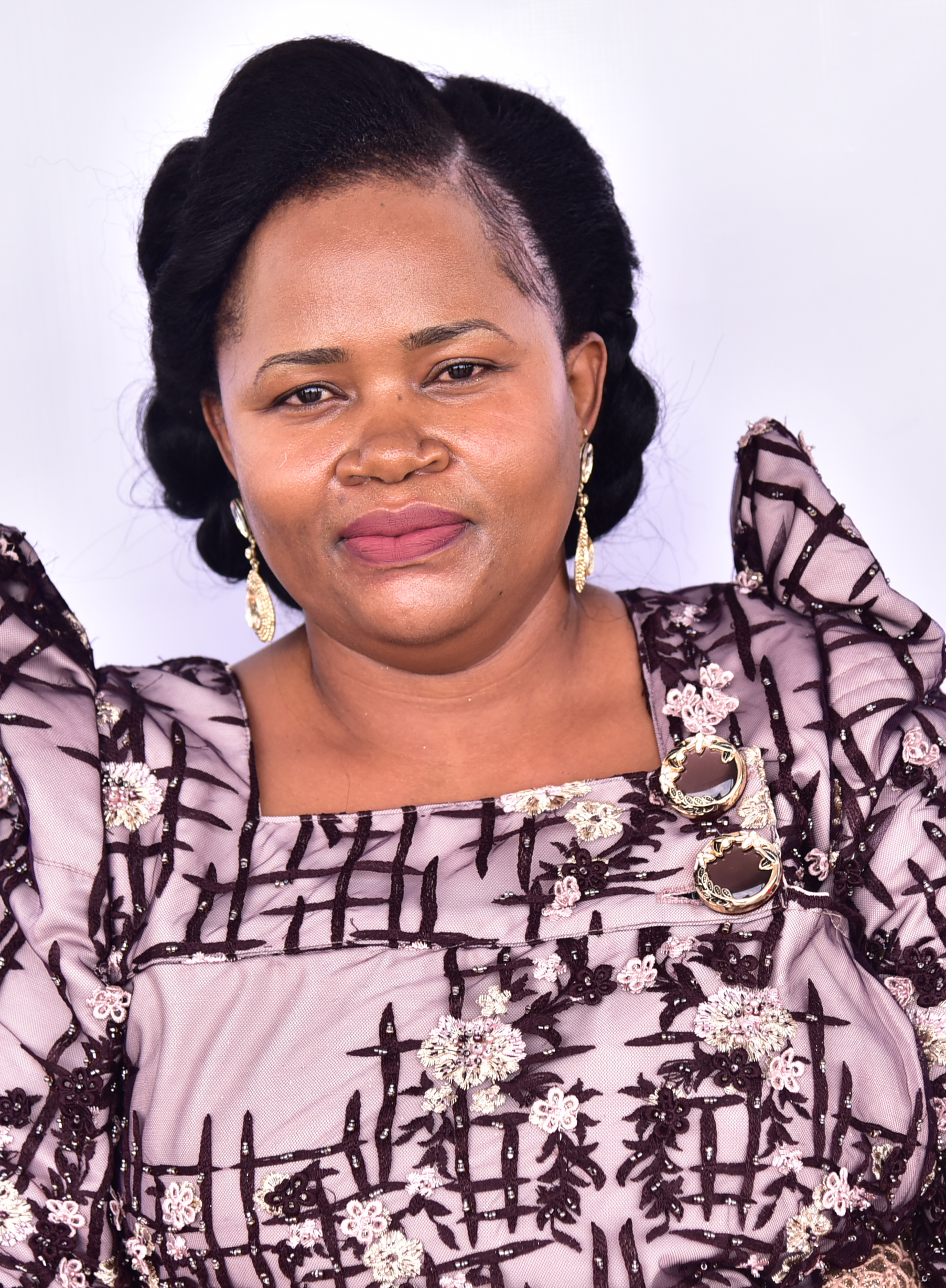
- Born: 24 December 1979 (age 46)
- Citizenship: Uganda
- Education: Nyakayojo Secondary School. Nkumba University Bachelor of Business Administration 2004. Master of Business Administration at Nkumba University 2009.
- Occupation: Accountant
- Notable work: Deputy Chairperson of the Committee on Human Rights in Parliament.
- Title: District Woman Representative for Kagadi District in the 10th parliament of Uganda re-elected in the 11th parliament.
- Movement: Affiliated with the National Resistance Movement.

Janepher Mbabazi Kyomuhendo (born 24 December 1979) is a Ugandan accountant by profession who also served as the District Woman Representative for Kagadi District in the 10th parliament of Uganda and re-elected in the 11th parliament. She was affiliated with the National Resistance Movement.

== Early life and education ==
Janepher Mbabazi Kyomuhendo was born on 24 December 1979. She attended Nyakayojo Secondary School for her Ordinary level education and she got her Uganda Certificate of Education in 1996. She completed her Uganda Advanced Certificate of Education from Kinoni Girls School in 1998. She later went for her further studies at Nkumba University from where she was awarded a Bachelor of Business Administration in 2004. She then went for her Master of Business Administration at Nkumba University and she finished it in 2009.

== Career ==
Janepher Mbabazi Kyomuhendo worked as a business manager for AIM Engineering (U) Ltd from 2005 to 2007. She was an Internal Auditor for Mengo Hospital from 2007 to 2009. She became a Finance and Administration Manager for AIM Engineering (U) Ltd from 2009 to 2012. In ILISO Consulting (Pty) Ltd, she was the Finance and Administration Manager from 2012 to 2015. She became a woman Representative Member of Parliament for Kagadi District in the 10th Parliament of Uganda from 2016 to 2021.

She was a member of the Committee of Public Accounts (Commissions, Statutory Authorities and State Enterprises-COSASE) Committee and also she was appointed to be a member of Physical Infrastructure committee. She is now the Deputy Chairperson of the Committee on Human Rights in Parliament and has been vocal about the Human Rights Defenders Protection Bill and the National Legal Aid Bill. On the Presidential Affairs Committee, she has warned against the use of Karamoja to amass illicit wealth.

== Other contributions ==
She has distributed supplies and financial support to local saving and credit cooperative organizations (SACCOS). She has also sponsored football and netball tournaments, covered tuition fees for 20 students at a vocational institution, and donated kitchenware. Additionally, she awards scholarships to students who demonstrate exceptional academic performance. In 2020, she donated 1,497 hoes, 127 saucepans, and 3,048 plates to the inhabitants of 127 villages within the Muhorro town council, as well as Mpeefu and Muhorro sub-counties.

== See also ==
1. List of members of the eleventh Parliament of Uganda
2. National Resistance Movement
3. Kagadi District
4. Jessica Alupo
5. Judith Alyek
6. Agnes Ameede
7. Susan Amero
8. Monicah Amoding
9. Anita Among
10. Betty Amongi
11. Jacqueline Amongin
12. Rebecca Amuge Otengo
13. Doreen Amule
14. Evelyn Anite
15. Davinia Esther Anyakun
16. Beatrice Atim Anywar
