= Jacqueline Asiimwe =

Ugandan lawyer and businessperson

- Born: 1970 (age 55–56); Mengo Hospital, Kampala, Uganda
- Education: Makerere University (Bachelor of Laws); Law Development Centre (Postgraduate Diploma in Legal Practice); Georgetown University Law Center (Master of Laws)
- Occupations: Lawyer and Corporate Executive
- Years active: since 1995
- Known for: Women's Rights Advocacy
- Title: Chief Executive Officer of CivSource Africa.
- Spouse: Peter Mwesige (m. 2002; div. 2021)

Jackie Asiimwe–Mwesige, (nee:Jacqueline Asiimwe) (born March 1970), is a Ugandan human rights lawyer and philanthropy advisor. She is the current Chairperson of the East African Philanthropy Network (EAPN) and chief executive officer of CivSource Africa, a philanthropy advisory service company that she founded in 2017.

She concurrently serves as the chairperson of the International Centre for Research on Women Uganda, an affiliate of the International Center for Research on Women ICRW, based in Washington, DC, United States. Jacqueline is a member of the Global Board of ICRW. She also served as the Deputy Programme and Advocacy Manager for the Civil Society Capacity Building Programme, funded by the European Union, from 2007 until 2009.

== Early life and education ==
She was born in March 1970 at Mengo Hospital in Kampala, Uganda's capital city. Her parents are Reverend Benon Mugarura Mutana and Mrs Joye Mugarura.

Asiimwe attended Mengo Primary School where she sat P7 in 1983. She then joined Gayaza High School the oldest girls' secondary school in Uganda, from 1984 to 1989 for both O-Level and A-Level studies. She holds a Bachelor of Laws degree, awarded by Makerere University, Uganda's largest and oldest public university.

She also holds a Postgraduate Diploma in Legal Practice, obtained from the Law Development Centre in Kampala. Her Master of Laws degree was awarded by Georgetown University Law School, in Washington, D.C.

== Career ==
While still an undergraduate at Makerere University, Jacqueline became a member of the Uganda chapter of Federacion Internacional de Abogadas (FIDA) (International Federation of Women Lawyers), starting as a volunteer.

She also worked as an advocacy officer at Uganda Women's Network (UWONET). During this time, she worked with many women who silently grapple with issues of maintenance, domestic violence, and rape.

She also worked as a country manager for an anonymous donor, Deputy Programme and Advocacy Manager for European Union Civil Society Capacity building programme, chief executive officer Uganda Women's Network, Fellow; Women's Rights Division of Human Rights Watch. Asiimwe is the chief executive officer of CivSource Africa, an organization that identifies and supports the work of funding agencies and philanthropists in Africa. The organization particularly seeks to connect with and support local/Africa led philanthropy and provides grant management and advisory services on context and strategy.

Asiimwe has also served as a Chairperson of the Ugandan affiliate of the International Center for Research on Women. She is a board member of Femme Forte, Project Soar and East Africa Philanthropy Network. She also served as the country manager for Uganda at Wellspring Advisors, an American philanthropic advisory firm.

Asiimwe is known for zealous fight for women's rights, not only in Uganda, but also internationally. She participated in the "Black Monday" campaign; an initiative by several civil society organisations to tackle corruption in Uganda.

== Professional memberships and affiliations ==
Jacqueline Asiimwe is a member of the following bodies, organizations and societies: (a) Uganda Association of Women Lawyers (FIDA Uganda) (b) the Uganda chapter of the International Coach Federation (c) a member of Forum for Women in Democracy (FOWODE) (d) a member of Gayaza Old Girls Association (GOGA) (e) a member of Uganda Feminist Forum (UFF) and (f) a member of Law and Advocacy for Women in Uganda (LAW Uganda).

== Consultancy experience ==
GiZ Human Rights Program, Global Rights Alert, Uganda Women Parliamentary Association (UWOPA), OXFAM GB Pan African office-Nairobi, UN Women, Forum for Women in Democracy, DFID, International Centre for Research on Women, HIVOS, OSIEA, SHARP, European Union Delegation in Kenya, Ministry of Justice Kenya, African Union Women and Gender Directorate, Action Aid International, National Democratic Institute and British Council Uganda.

== Family ==
Jacqueline married Peter Mwesige, a journalist, on 22 December 2002, in Perryman, Maryland, United States. The marriage was blessed with two sons. However, it was officially dissolved in a sitting of the High Court of Uganda, in Kampala, Uganda, on 30 November 2021. The couple was granted joint custody of their two children together.

== Other affiliations ==
Asiimwe is a Fellow of the Women's Rights Division of Human Rights Watch.

== See also ==
- Sheila Kawamara-Mishambi
- Olum Lornah Afoyomungu
- Sanyu Penelope
