= Anti-Homosexuality Act =

Anti-Homosexuality Act may refer to two Ugandan acts of parliament:

- Anti-Homosexuality Act, 2023
- Anti-Homosexuality Act, 2014

== See also ==
- LGBT rights by country or territory
