= Kimberley Jael Aremo Acio =

Ugandan model

- Born: August 3, 2006 (age 20); Uganda
- Education: Secondary school valedictorian
- Occupations: Model, beauty pageant titleholder, content creator
- Known for: First Runner-up, Miss Universe Uganda
- Awards: People's Choice Award; Wellness Queen Award

Kimberly Jael Aremo Acio (August 3, 2006) is a Ugandan model and beauty pageant titleholder who became famous for her performance in the 2026 Miss Universe Uganda and emerged as the first runner-up, including winning the People's Choice Award and the Wellness Queen Award.

== Pageantry ==
She is from Kole district, based in the Lango sub-region, Northern Uganda. She was a valedictorian, finishing top of her class in secondary school with her sights firmly set on studying biomedical engineering. She joined Miss Universe Uganda because of its development and advocacy programme where she centred on intentional mentorship for young people, particularly girls. The mentorship for young people inspired Kimberly after enduring severe bullying which made her dread going to school. Kimberly went viral on social media because of her natural short hair, confident stage presence, personal story and her campaign against bullying and youth empowerment advocacy. This made her one of the competition's most recognisable contestants.

She was crowned the first runner-up, won the People's Choice Award and received the Wellness Queen Award during the 2026 Miss Universe Uganda competition. She was among the top five for Miss Universe Uganda. However, Kimberly not winning the first Miss Universe Uganda led to several social media users questioning the judging criteria, and they responded that a winner is chosen on overall performance, not public votes alone. Beyond this, she is also a Pepsi addict from childhood and content creator.

== See also ==
- Miss Universe 2026
- Cindy Sanyu
- Sanyu Penelope
- Mercy Faith Lakisa
