= Parents and Friends of Ex-Gays and Gays =

Ex-gay organization

Parents and Friends of Ex-Gays and Gays (PFOX) is a non-profit organization that promotes the ex-gay movement. PFOX advocates the view that homosexuality is not a product of biological determination. Past presidents of PFOX include Greg Quinlan and Richard Cohen.

== Background ==
PFOX, founded in 1998, is headquartered in Fort Belvoir, Virginia. Richard Cohen, who describes himself as ex-gay, was the president of PFOX for a period of time. After Cohen was interviewed by Jason Jones on the March 19, 2007, episode of The Daily Show, PFOX removed references to Cohen from their website.

Greg Quinlan is a self-described former homosexual who came out at the age of 23. He has stated that he "departed from homosexuality" in 1993, and went on to found the Pro-Family Network, a conservative advocacy organization.

PFOX is a signatory organization of Positive Alternatives to Homosexuality (PATH), which is "a non-profit coalition of organizations that help people with unwanted same-sex attractions (SSA) realize their personal goals for change -- whether by developing their innate heterosexual potential or by embracing a lifestyle as a single, non-sexually active man or woman." As a member, PFOX has adopted PATH's statement of principles. PFOX is supported by the Family Research Council.

== Positions ==
The PFOX website states: "We must seek the facts and love our children unconditionally without having to affirm their homosexual behavior." PFOX also advocates acceptance of people who identify as ex-gay. The group is known for promoting views that transsexual people are biologically appropriate at birth. They are opposed to sexual reassignment surgery, proposing counseling instead. They also believe being gay is a political identity. PFOX neither provides nor renders therapeutic services.

== Activities ==
In December 2007, when the Washington, D.C. Board of Education approved new health and physical education guidelines, PFOX voiced opposition to the "grade-specific sex education and information about HIV/AIDS" on the basis that "the standards are not age-appropriate and would undermine abstinence-only messages." PFOX opposed legislation to protect transgender people from discrimination, stating their concern that it gave "male cross-dressers access to women's restrooms".

On October 16, 2008, PFOX sued the District of Columbia Office of Human Rights (OHR) for failing to protect former homosexuals under its sexual orientation anti-discrimination law. This was after the OHR stood with the National Education Association (NEA) in its refusal to provide public accommodations to ex-gays. The court ruled in favour of the NEA, and also stated that ex-gays are a protected class that must be recognized under sexual orientation non-discrimination laws.

In December 2014 PFOX got national exposure for putting up a billboard next to highway I-95 in Richmond, Virginia. The billboard featured the text "Identical twins: One gay. One not. We believe twin research studies show nobody is born gay", in between photos of two men, seemingly identical twins. Both images on the billboard were stock photos of one man who identified himself as being "openly gay and happy my entire life", and criticized PFOX and their billboard.

== Criticism ==
Many of PFOX's views on the developmental causes of homosexuality and gender identity are in the minority of community opinion and unsupported by health professionals. PFOX's assertion that being gay is a choice relies heavily on two scientific studies which deny the existence of a "gay gene". Their interpretation of one of the studies, which was conducted in 2000, was later disputed by its main researcher. The American Psychological Association has studied the efforts of people seeking to change their sexual orientation, resulting in a 2009 resolution concluding, ’’there is insufficient evidence to support the use of psychological interventions to change sexual orientation,’’ and recommending that mental health professionals should avoid telling clients that they can change their sexual orientation through therapy or other treatments.

PFOX was described in the Washington City Paper as "ignoring the interests of ex-gays", and having almost no ex-gay members. The organization is composed almost entirely of people who state they have always been straight; of the ten people who make up the groups board of directors, only one states they are ex-gay. A PFOX representative has stated that PFOX meetings are "for families and friends of strugglers only, and not for ex-gays."

In 2004, the National Mental Health Association declined PFOX's application for booth space at their annual convention, calling the group's principles a divergence from the association's core mission. They have also been denied participation at events held by the American Association of University Women. Parents, Families and Friends of Lesbians and Gays (PFLAG)—which participated in 2004 and 2005 at the NPTA convention—has responded to PFOX:

PFLAG and others also find the basic premise of PFOX's rationale confusing. If someone is not gay or bisexual, they are heterosexual. "Since this is the case," says PFLAG's executive director Jody Huckaby, "PFOX should have no concerns."

In 2010, gay rights advocate Wayne Besen described PFOX as being "as sickening as it is scandalous", saying that the PFOX group had been tied to "an eliminationist campaign, worldwide, against gay people" including the Uganda Anti-Homosexuality Bill.

== See also ==
- Detransition
- Ex-gay movement
- Ex-ex-gay
