= Veronicah Namagembe =

Ugandan businesswoman

Veronicah Gladys Namagembe
- Citizenship: Uganda
- Education: Durham Business School, Makerere University Business School, Makerere University
- Occupation: Managing Director
- Organization: Pride Microfinance Limited
- Known for: Gender equality and financial inclusion
- Notable work: Honorary Fellow with the Uganda Institute of Banking & Finance Services

Veronicah Gladys Namagembe is a Ugandan Rotarian, member of the Bible Society of Uganda, the Managing Director of Pride Microfinance Limited(MDI), an Honorary Fellow with the Uganda Institute of Banking & Finance Services.

== Education ==
Veronicah holds a Master of Business Administration from Durham Business School UK, Master of Science in accounting and Finance from Makerere University Business School and a Bachelor’s Degree in Business Administration from Makerere University. She has also attended Executive Leadership programs from Harvard Business School, London School of Economics, Harvard Kennedy School of Public Management, Yale School of Management, Lagos Business School & Strathmore Business.

== Career ==
Veronicah was the acting Managing Director before being fully appointed as the Managing Director of Pride Microfinance Bank Limited (MDI), a regulated and supervised microfinance deposit taking Institution in Uganda. As Managing Director, she has ensured sustainable operations, business expansion, growth, risk and compliance management. She has also contributed to the advancement of financial inclusion in Uganda through promoting gender equality and food security.

Under her stewardship at Pride Microfinance Limited, Veronicah has made the MDI grow the customer base to over 700,000 customers. Under her leadership, Pride Microfinance Limited has grown total equity from Ugx 6BN (equivalent to $1.6MN) to Ugx 141.7BN (equivalent to $38.8MN) as at end of December 2020.

== Achievements ==
- Currently Veronicah Gladys Namagembe is working as the Managing Director (MD) of Pride Microfinance Limited (MDI), the largest and most profitable MDI in Uganda.
- She worked with Diamond Trust Bank Uganda for 1 year and Uganda Women’s Finance Trust, (currently Finance Trust Bank) for 6 years.
- She has served as the National President of the Association of Microfinance Institutions in Uganda (AMFIU).
- She is a Board Member of Lubiri High School, Board member of The Uganda Institute of Banking & Financial Services (UIBFS) where she seats as the chairperson of the Finance and Human Resource Committee.
- She is currently an EXCO member of Uganda Bankers Association representing all supervised Financial institutions under Tier 2 & Tier 3.
- She is Board Vice Chairperson for Majestic Brands Ltd, a Board Member at Pride Microfinance where she sits on the board committees for: Risk, Assets & Labilities; Compensation, Human Resource, Administration & Procurement; as well as Strategy and Compliance.
- Veronicah steered Pride Microfinance Limited to scoop the Platinum winner accolade 2020/2021 of the Consumers’ Choice AWARDS contest in the category of Uganda’s best Microfinance Institution as chosen by the Consumers.

== See also ==
- Sheila Kawamara
