= Lornah =

Lornah can be a feminine given name or a middle name. Notable people with the name include:

- Lornah Kiplagat (born 1974), Kenyan-born Dutch long-distance runner
- Olum Lornah Afoyomungu, Ugandan feminist
