= Sheila Kawamara-Mishambi =

Ugandan journalist

- Citizenship: Uganda
- Occupation: Journalist/ activist
- Known for: Journalism/ Women Activism

Sheila Kawamara-Mishambi is a Ugandan journalist and executive director of the Eastern African Sub-Regional Support Initiative for the Advancement of Women (EASSI) and former Legislator in the East African Legislative Assembly (EALA). She originally became known for covering the Rwandan Genocide in 1994 and is now known for her feminist activism and work on human rights and conflict resolution.

== Early life and education ==
Kawamara was born in Iganga to the late Sergio Kawamara and Helena Kajumba Kawamara. The family later relocated to Tooro Kabarole district before moving to Kampala where she started school at Luzira Primary School. She also attended Shimoni Demonstration School; a merger of Indian Primary School and Shimoni Primary School.

Kawamara sat A-levels at Trinity College Nabbingo in Kampala. It was here that she defied advice from her teachers to have law as first choice course for university and chose to be a teacher instead. She holds degrees from Makerere University, the Institute of Social Studies, The Hague, in The Netherlands, and the Uganda Management Institute in Kampala.

== Career ==
Kawamara gained popularity for her work covering the Rwandan genocide in 1994 while working with New Vision Group. She was among a small group of Ugandan journalists who headed into Rwanda to cover the genocide two days after then-President Juvenal Habyarimana's plane was shot down. While continuing her journalism work, she also taught Economics at Trinity College Nabbingo and became the Executive Director of Uganda Women's Network (UWONET). From November 2001 to November 2006 she was a Member of the East African Legislative Assembly (EALA). After leaving the Assembly, she became the Executive Director of the Eastern African Sub-Regional Support Initiative for the Advancement of Women (EASSI).

Kawamara-Mishambi is also a private entrepreneur and an alumnus of the Cherie Blair Foundation.

== See also ==
- Jacqueline Asiimwe
- George Lugalambi
