= Asuman Basalirwa =

Ugandan politician

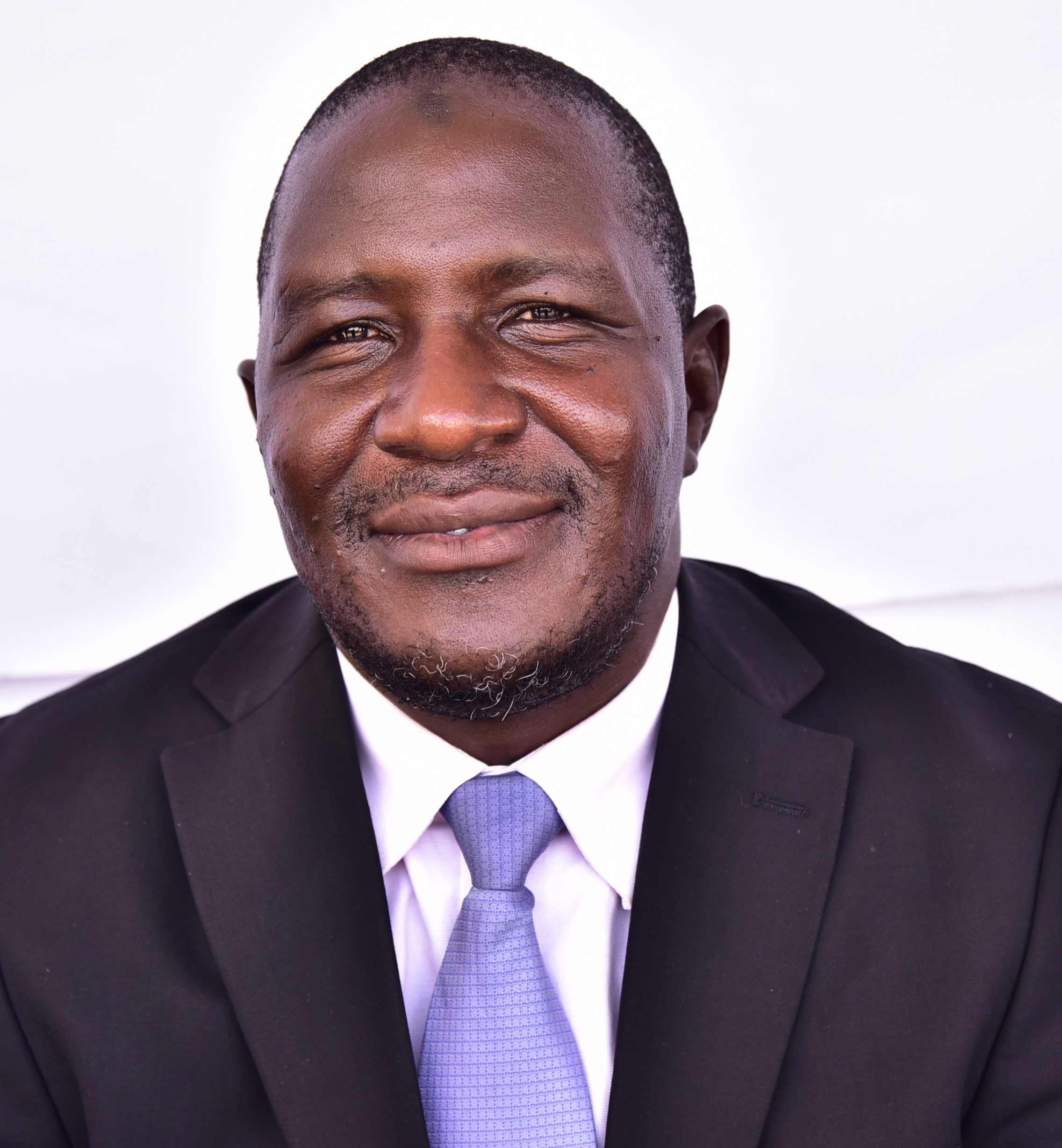

Member of the Ugandan Parliament from Bugiri Municipality
- Incumbent
- Assumed office 2018

Personal details
- Born: November 17, 1977 (age 48)
- Party: Justice Forum
- Education: Makerere University

Asuman Basalirwa (born November 17, 1977) is a Ugandan politician and former member of the 11th parliament who represented Bugiri Municipality in the Eastern Region of Uganda. He was first elected to the parliament in 2018 on the ticket of Justice Forum (JEEMA). He is also the Chairperson of Parliament of Uganda Muslim Association and the Parliament of Uganda Sports Club.

== Education ==
Basalirwa earned his First School Leaving Certificate from Mwiri Primary School in 1991, and Uganda Certificate of Education (UCE), 1996 and Uganda Advanced Certificate of Education (UACE) from Kiira College Butiki in 1998. He holds a Diploma in Legal Practice from the Law Development Centre (LDC) Kampala, Uganda in 2004. In 2008, he finished from Pretoria University with a Certificate in International Humanitarian Law and a Master of Laws from Makerere University in 2015. He’s a Lawyer/Partner at Sewankambo & Co. Advocates.

== Political career ==
Basalirwa serves as the President of Justice Forum (JEEMA) from 2010 to date, aposition he has held since its inception as a full political party in Uganda. He is the Chairperson of the Inter-Party Organisation on Dialogue (IPOD). He was elected to the parliament in 2018 and was re-elected in the 2021 general election to represent Bugiri Municipality. He serves as the Deputy Chairperson of the Public Accounts Committee (PAC) of Parliament.

== Anti-homosexuality stance ==
In March 2023, he tabled the Anti-Homosexuality Bill, 2023, which would criminalise and jail people who identify as LGBTQ in Uganda. Anyone engaging in a same-sex relationship or in a same-sex marriage in Uganda would serve a 10-year jail sentence. President Yoweri Museveni signed the Anti-Homosexuality Bill into law on 29 May 2023 after parliament watered it down. It is still among the harshest anti-LGBTQ laws in the world. Homosexual acts are already illegal in Uganda but now anyone convicted faces life imprisonment.

In 2026 general elections, he lost his parliamentary seat to the NRM's John Francis Oketcho in a hotly contested election polls.

== See also ==
- Bugiri District
- Bugiri Municipality
- Anti-Homosexuality Bill, 2023
- Justice Forum (JEEMA)
