= Davinia Esther Anyakun =

Ugandan logistician and politician

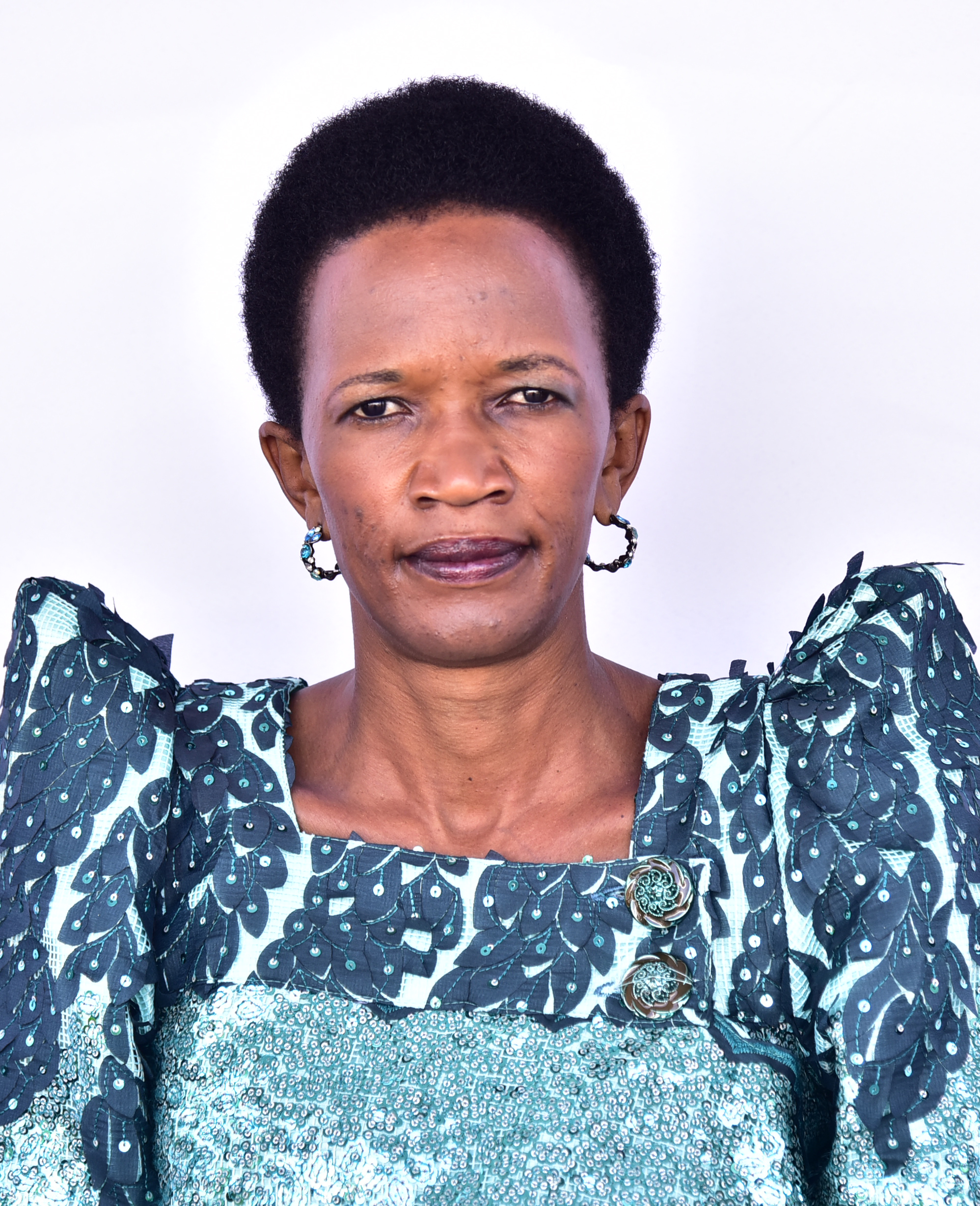
- Born: Davinia Anyakun; 19 April 1976 (age 50); Nakapiripirit District, Karamoja Subregion, Uganda
- Education: Nkoyoyo Boarding Primary School; Kangole Senior Secondary School; Mbale Secondary School; Makerere Institute of Social Development (Diploma in Social Work and Social Administration); Uganda Christian University (Diploma in Health Administration); Nkumba University (Bachelors in Procurement and Logistics); Eastern and Southern African Management Institute (Executive MBA)
- Occupations: Social worker and politician
- Years active: 2004 – present
- Known for: Politics, social works
- Children: 1
- Website: Homepage

Davinia Esther Anyakun (born 19 April 1976) is a female Ugandan politician and a procurement and logistics professional. She has been the woman Member of Parliament for Nakapiripirit District since 2016, on the ruling National Resistance Movement political party ticket.

Anyakun was first elected to the 10th Parliament (2016-2021). She was re-elected in February 2021, to the 11th Parliament (2021-2026). She was appointed Minister of State for Relief, Disaster Preparedness and Refugees, in the Office of the Prime Minister, in June 2021.

In a cabinet reshuffle in March 2024, she was transferred to the Ministry of Labour as the State Minister for Employment and Industrial Relations.

== Early life and education ==
Anyakun was born on 19 April 1976 in Nakapiripirit District in the Karamoja sub-region, Northern Region of Uganda. She attended Nkoyoyo Boarding Primary School and completed her Primary Leaving Examinations in 1991. She then attended Kangole Senior Secondary School where she obtained her Uganda Certificate of Education in 1995. She then transferred to Mbale Secondary School in 1999 and she graduated with the Uganda Advanced Certificate of Education or A-Level certificate (equivalent to a High School Diploma).

Three years later, she was awarded Diploma in Social Work and Social Administration at Makerere Institute for Social Development. She then obtained a Diploma in Health Administration from Uganda Christian University in Mukono. In 2009, she obtained a Bachelor of Arts degree in procurement and logistics from Nkumba University. Later, she graduated from the Eastern and Southern African Management Institute (ESAMI) with an Executive MBA degree.

== Career ==
=== Beginnings ===
Anyakun started her formal work from Amudat Hospital in 2004 as a senior hospital administrator which she did till 2010. In 2010 she joined the International Organization for Migration as a project officer. In 2013 she started working with Agricultural Cooperative Development International/Volunteers in Overseas Cooperative Assistance and the United States Agency for International Development as a regional coordinator until 2015. In 2016 she was elected to the Parliament of Uganda for Nakapiripit District.

=== Political career ===
Anyakun is the woman Member of Parliament for Nakapiripiriti District. She entered the Parliament of Uganda in May 2016 running on the National Resistance Movement party ticket. In Parliament, she serves or served as a member of the Public Accounts Committee and the Committee on Foreign Affairs. She is also a member of the Uganda Women Parliamentary Association (UWOPA).

== Personal life ==
Anyakun is the mother of one daughter, Challa Elma Kapel, who was crowned Miss Tourism Uganda in 2017.
