= Anti-Homosexuality Act, 2014 =

Ugandan law

Parliament of Uganda
- Long title: An Act to prohibit any form of sexual relations between persons of the same sex; prohibit the promotion or recognition of such relations and to provide for other related matters.
- Citation: Act No. 4 of 2014
- Territorial extent: Uganda
- Passed by: Parliament of Uganda
- Passed: 20 December 2013
- Signed by: Yoweri Museveni
- Signed: 24 February 2014
- Commenced: 24 February 2014

Legislative history
- Bill citation: Anti Homosexuality Bill, 2009
- Introduced by: David Bahati (NRM)
- Introduced: 14 October 2009

Struck down by
- Constitutional Court of Uganda

Summary
- Broadens criminalisation of same-sex relations in Uganda
- Status: Struck down

The Anti-Homosexuality Act, 2014 was an act passed by the Parliament of Uganda on 20 December 2013, which prohibited sexual relations between persons of the same sex. The act was previously called the "Kill the Gays bill" in the western mainstream media due to death penalty clauses proposed in the original version, but the penalty was later amended to life imprisonment. The bill was signed into law by the President of Uganda Yoweri Museveni on 24 February 2014. On 1 August 2014, however, the Constitutional Court of Uganda ruled the act invalid on procedural grounds.

The act would have broadened the criminalisation of same-sex relations in Uganda domestically. It also includes provisions about persons outside of Uganda who are charged with violating the act, asserting that they may be extradited to Uganda for punishment there. The act also includes penalties for individuals, companies, and non-governmental organisations that aid or abet same-sex sexual acts, including conducting a gay marriage. Furthermore, the act enables the Ugandan government to rescind international and regional commitments it deems outside of the interest of the act's provisions.

Same-sex relationships have been illegal in Uganda since colonial rule – as they are in many African countries, especially former British colonies – and before this Act was passed, they were punishable by incarceration in prison for up to 14 years. The act was introduced as the Anti Homosexuality Bill, 2009 by Member of Parliament (MP) David Bahati (National Resistance Movement) on 14 October 2009. A special motion to introduce the bill was passed a month after a two-day conference was held in which three Christians from the United States asserted that homosexuality is a direct threat to the cohesion of African families. The international community, however, assailed the law, accusing the Ugandan government of encouraging violence against LGBT people with the law. The United States imposed economic sanctions against Uganda in June 2014 in response to the law, the World Bank indefinitely postponed a $90 million aid loan to Uganda and the governments of Denmark, the Netherlands, Sweden and Norway halted aid to Uganda in opposition to the law; the Ugandan government defended the bill and rejected condemnation of it, with the country's authorities stating President Museveni wanted "to demonstrate Uganda's independence in the face of Western pressure and provocation". Several sources have noted that the act has exacerbated both the endemic homophobia in Uganda and the associated discussions about it. Others more specifically claim that such legislative actions are the result of politicized homophobia, a rhetorical tool used to further the interests of political leaders in the form of gaining popularity and/or distracting from corrupt behaviour.

Parliament passed similar bills in 2021 and 2023: the Sexual Offenses Bill, 2019, passed in May 2021 and vetoed by President Yoweri Museveni and the Anti-Homosexuality Bill, 2023.

== Background ==
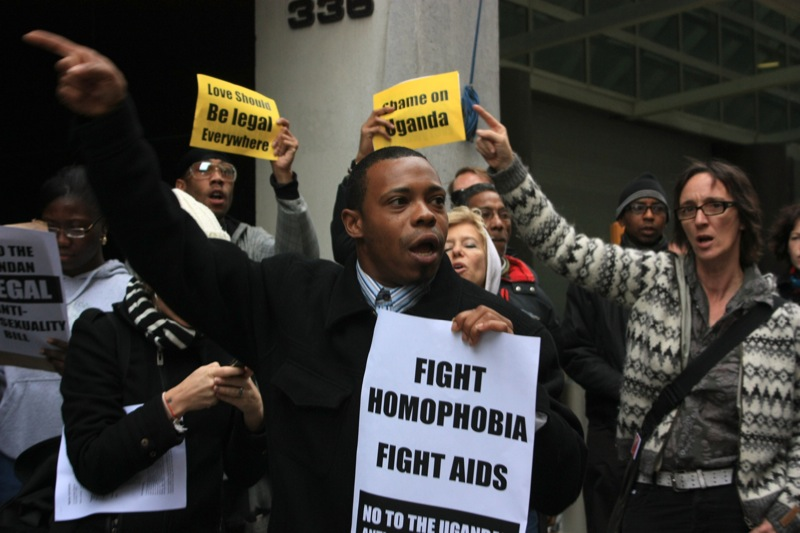
The AIDS Coalition to Unleash Power protests in New York City against the bill.

Some gay rights advocates have claimed that around 500,000 people in Uganda or 1.4 percent of its population are gay. The Ugandan government, however, has characterized the 500,000 people claim as an exaggeration designed to increase the popularity of homosexuality, and the BBC in 2009 asserted the impossibility of determining the actual number of gay people living in Uganda.

Existing laws in Uganda criminalise homosexual behavior with prison sentences, some of which can be as long as 14 years. These laws were introduced during the colonial era in order to eliminate what the colonial authorities deemed "unnatural sex". In some areas, male homosexuality was age-stratified, similar to ancient Greece where warriors purchased boys as brides, common when women were not available, or manifested as fleeting encounters as in prostitution. Human rights groups have demanded reform of those laws and decriminalisation of homosexuality and asserted that the laws reinforce prejudice and promote violence against LGBT people.

According to a reporter in Africa, "Africans see homosexuality as being both un-African and un-Christian". Thirty-eight of 53 African nations criminalise homosexuality in some way. A 2013 poll found that the overwhelming majority of Ugandans disapproved of homosexuality. In sub-Saharan Africa, only the governments of South Africa and Namibia support gay rights. But South Africa's support of LGBT rights did not prevent the rape and murder of LGBT rights activist Eudy Simelane in 2008. Human rights groups have criticized the police for being inactive and apathetic. Like the conditions in many other African nations, gays in Uganda face an atmosphere of physical abuse, vandalism of their property, blackmail, death threats, and "corrective rape".

From 5 to 8 March 2009, a workshop organised by the Family Life Network, led by Ugandan Stephen Langa, and entitled "Seminar on Exposing the Homosexuals' Agenda" took place in Kampala, the capital of Uganda. The workshop featured three US evangelical Christians: Scott Lively, an author who has written several books opposing homosexuality; Caleb Lee Brundidge, a self-professed former gay man who conducts sessions to heal homosexuality; and Don Schmierer, a board member of Exodus International, an organisation devoted to promoting "freedom from homosexuality through the power of Jesus Christ" and which was funded by restaurant chain Chick-Fil-A. The theme of the conference, according to The New York Times, was the "gay agenda": "how to make gay people straight, how gay men often sodomized teenage boys and how 'the gay movement is an evil institution' whose goal is 'to defeat the marriage-based society and replace it with a culture of sexual promiscuity' ". Kapya Kaoma, an Anglican priest from Zambia, was in attendance and reported on the conference. Lively asserted in his workshops that legalizing homosexuality would be akin to accepting child molestation and bestiality. He also claimed that gays threaten society by causing higher divorce rates, child abuse, and HIV transmission. He said that US homosexuals are out to recruit young people into homosexual lifestyles. According to Kaoma, one of the thousands of Ugandans in attendance announced during the conference, "[The parliament] feels it is necessary to draft a new law that deals comprehensively with the issue of homosexuality and ... takes into account the international gay agenda.... Right now there is a proposal that a new law be drafted."

Also during March 2009, Lively met with several Ugandan MPs and Minister of Ethics and Integrity James Nsaba Buturo. Lively then wrote in his blog that Langa was "overjoyed with the results of our efforts and predicted confidently that the coming weeks would see significant improvement in the moral climate of the nation, and a massive increase in pro-family activism in every social sphere. He said that a respected observer of society in Kampala had told him that our campaign was like a nuclear bomb against the 'gay' agenda in Uganda. I pray that this, and the predictions, are true."

In April 2009, a local Ugandan newspaper printed the names of suspected homosexuals, another printed tips on how to identify gays for the general public, and, in October 2010, another named Rolling Stone (unaffiliated with the American Rolling Stone) published a story featuring a list of the nation's 100 "top" gays and lesbians with their photos and addresses. Next to the list was a yellow strip with the words "hang them". Julian Pepe, a program coordinator for Sexual Minorities Uganda, said that people named in the story were living in fear and that attacks have begun, prompting many to abandon their jobs and others to relocate. The paper's editor justified the list to expose gays and lesbians so authorities could arrest them, while Buturo dismissed complaints from gay people and sympathisers by stating that protests about the outing is part of a campaign to mobilise support and sympathy from outside the country. The high court of Uganda ordered Rolling Stone to stop publishing images of gay and lesbian people after David Kato and several others sued the paper.

Langa specifically cited the unlicensed conversion therapist Richard A. Cohen, who stated in Coming Out Straight, a book that was given to Langa and other prominent Ugandans, that homosexuals were more likely to molest children. These statements were based on faulty studies performed by Paul Cameron, who has been expelled from the American Psychological Association, the Canadian Psychological Association, and the American Sociological Association. Cohen later said these statements would be removed from future editions of the book.

== Overview ==
=== Bill as introduced ===
In April 2009, the Ugandan Parliament passed a resolution allowing MP David Bahati to submit a private member's bill in October to strengthen laws against homosexuality. Bahati proposed the bill on 14 October 2009.

The bill provided specific definitions of "the offence of homosexuality", for which an offender could receive life imprisonment, and "aggravated homosexuality", for which an offender could receive the death penalty. "The offence of homosexuality" was defined to include various same-sex sexual acts. "Aggravated homosexuality" was defined to include a same-sex sexual act: with a person under the age of 18; committed by a person who is HIV-positive; by a parent or guardian of the person with whom the act is committed; by a person in authority over the person with whom the act is committed; the victim of which is a person with a disability; by a serial offender; or by a person who administers any drug, matter, or thing with the intent to stupefy or overpower another person to enable a same-sex act to be committed. A person charged with "aggravated homosexuality" would be forced to undergo an HIV test. A person who attempted to commit "the offence of homosexuality" could receive imprisonment for seven years. A person who attempted to commit "aggravated homosexuality" could receive life imprisonment.

Among other things, the bill also would have criminalized a person who "aids, abets, counsels, or procures another to engage in an act of homosexuality" and provides a possible penalty of seven years imprisonment. A person who "purports to contract a marriage with another person of the same sex" would commit the "offence of homosexuality" and could be imprisoned for life. A person who promotes or abets homosexuality, as broadly defined by the bill, could be fined and imprisoned for five to seven years except that if the person were a corporate body, business, association, or non-governmental organization, its registration would be cancelled and the "director, proprietor or promoter" could get seven years imprisonment. A "person in authority" who becomes aware of an offense under the bill could be fined and imprisoned for up to three years unless the person reported the offense within 24 hours. The bill, by its own terms, would apply to any offense committed under the bill by a person who is a citizen or permanent resident of Uganda, regardless of whether the offense was committed in Uganda, and could be extradited to Uganda.

When the bill was introduced, an independent MP stated that he thought it had about a 99 percent chance of passing. Uganda's President Yoweri Museveni openly expressed his support for the bill, stating "We used to say Mr and Mrs, but now it is Mr and Mr. What is that now?"

=== Parliamentary consideration of the bill in 2009–11 ===
After facing intense international reaction and promises from Western nations to cut financial aid to Uganda, Uganda's Minister Buturo said on 9 December 2009 that Uganda will revise the bill to drop the death penalty and substitute life imprisonment for gay people with multiple offences. Initially, however, Buturo stated that the government was determined to pass the bill "even if meant withdrawing from international treaties and conventions such as the UN's Universal Declaration on Human Rights, and forgoing donor funding", according to an interview in The Guardian. Bahati, the bill's sponsor, subsequently and repeatedly denied those reports. On 23 December, Reuters reported that Buturo again said that the death penalty would be dropped from the bill. He claimed that protests from western nations did not affect this decision.

On 8 January 2010, Bahati again asserted that he would not postpone or shelve the bill, even after Minister of State for Investment Aston Kajara stated that the Ugandan government would ask Bahati to withdraw it and President Museveni asserted that it was too harsh. On 12 January 2010, President Museveni told the news media that there is need to exercise "extreme caution" and that his cabinet members will speak to Bahati to reach a compromise to both satisfy Bahati's concerns and properly weigh the calls against the bill that Museveni has received from throughout the world. The bill was held for further discussion for the remainder of 2010.

Parliament adjourned in May 2011 without voting on the bill. Bahati stated, however, that he intended to re-introduce the bill in the next parliament.

=== Subsequent consideration and passage by parliament ===
In August 2011, the Ugandan cabinet decided unanimously that current laws making homosexuality illegal were sufficient.

Parliament voted in October 2011 to reopen the debate, with Speaker of Parliament Rebecca Kadaga stating that the bill would be sent to committee. In late 2011, Bloomberg NewsPresident Museveni probably would have vetoed the bill because of international pressure. Speaker Kadaga vowed to pass the bill in 2012. Bahati re-introduced the bill in February 2012. In November 2012, the Speaker agreed to pass a new law against homosexuality by the end of 2012 as a "Christmas gift" to its advocates. The bill did not pass in 2012.

The bill was listed as number eight under "Business to Follow" for 2013. At that stage, no changes to the bill had been presented. It had been reported that members of the Ugandan Parliament were looking to hold debate behind closed doors. National Youth MP Monica Amoding told The Observer that some MPs on the Legal and Parliamentary Affairs Committee proposed the move because of the sensitive nature of the bill. "This subject is very sensitive and some of us fear that if it is discussed in public view, we will be persecuted for holding particular views," Amoding said.

On 20 December 2013, Parliament passed the bill with the offences of "homosexuality" and "aggravated homosexuality" being punishable with life imprisonment.

=== Consideration of the bill by President Museveni ===
In a letter dated 28 December 2013 to the speaker and members of the Ugandan parliament, President Museveni expressed dismay that the bill had been passed without the required quorum.

On 14 February 2014, President Museveni announced that he would sign the bill into law. According to the government, his decision was based on a report by "medical experts" who said "homosexuality is not genetic but a social behavior."

A few days later, he retracted this announcement and asked the US for scientific advice about whether homosexuality is genetically pre-determined or a choice. He indicated he needed to know "whether, indeed, there are people who are born homosexual", in which case it would be wrong to punish them. He said that he would not sign the bill until that matter had been clarified.

Museveni publicly signed the bill into law on 24 February and afterwards said that, based on a scientific study he commissioned, people are not born homosexual.

=== Act as signed into law ===
The act provides specific definitions of "the offence of homosexuality" and "aggravated homosexuality". A person who commits either offence can receive life imprisonment. "The offence of homosexuality" is defined to include various same-sex sexual acts. "Aggravated homosexuality" is defined to include a same-sex sexual act: with a person under the age of 18; committed by a person who is HIV-positive; by a parent or guardian of the person with whom the act is committed; by a person in authority over the person with whom the act is committed; with a disabled person; by a serial offender; or by a person who administers any drug, matter, or thing with the intent to stupefy or overpower another person to enable a same-sex act to be committed. A person charged with "aggravated homosexuality" is forced to undergo an HIV test. A person who attempts to commit "the offence of homosexuality" can receive imprisonment for seven years. A person who attempts to commit "aggravated homosexuality" can receive life imprisonment.

Among other things, the act also criminalises a person who "aids, abets, counsels, or procures another to engage in an act of homosexuality" and provides a possible penalty of seven years imprisonment. A person who "purports to contract a marriage with another person of the same sex" commits the "offence of homosexuality" and can be imprisoned for life. A person that conducts a marriage ceremony between persons of the same sex can be imprisoned for a maximum of seven years. An institution that conducts this type of marriage can have its licence cancelled. A person who promotes or abets homosexuality, as broadly defined by the bill, can be fined and imprisoned for five to seven years except that if the person were a corporate body, business, association, or non-governmental organization, its registration can be cancelled and the "director, proprietor or promoter" can get seven years imprisonment. A person charged with an offence under the act may be extradited to Uganda, as provided under existing extradition law.

== Reactions ==
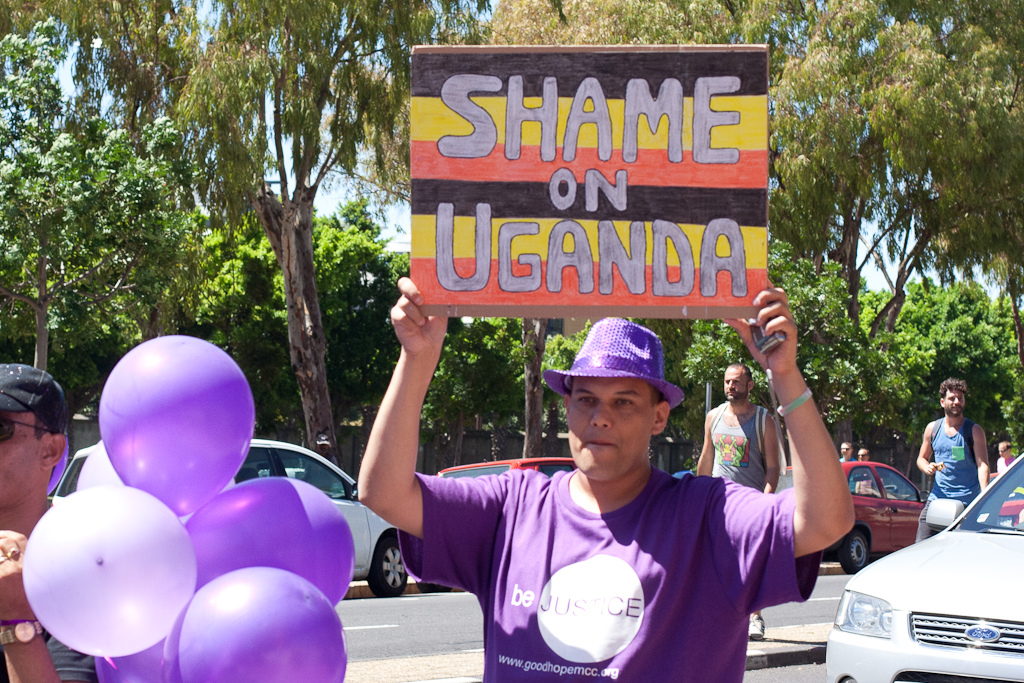
Cape Town Pride 2014 participants protested in support of LGBT rights in Uganda.

Amnesty International reported in October 2009 that arrests of people suspected of having homosexual relations were arbitrary and that authorities tortured and abused detainees.

=== Religious leaders ===
Scott Lively, who presides the anti-LGBT group Abiding Truth Ministries, disagreed with the bill, saying "I agree with the general goal but this law is far too harsh.... Society should actively discourage all sex outside of marriage and that includes homosexuality.... The family is under threat.... [Gay people] should not be parading around the streets."

Richard A. Cohen, a US psychiatrist associated with the ex-gay movement, condemned the bill and stated that its punitive measures are "incomprehensible".

Don Schmierer, a US evangelical preacher associated with the ex-gay movement Exodus International, expressed shock at the bill, telling The New York Times that, although he outlined how homosexuals could change to heterosexual in the March 2009 conference, his involvement was limited to giving seminars to Africans about better parenting skills: "[The bill is] horrible, absolutely horrible... Some of the nicest people I have ever met are gay people."

Southern Baptist pastor Rick Warren publicly denounced the bill, calling it "un-Christian".

Martin Ssempa, a Ugandan pastor and former affiliate of Warren, endorsed the bill. In February 2010, to counter opposition to the bill, Ssempa showed gay pornography to 300 members of his church, shocking them with images of explicit sexual acts and implying that all gay people engage in them, but straight people do not.

Several Christian organizations opposed the bill, including the Anglican Church of Canada, Integrity Uganda, Exodus International, Accepting Evangelicals, Changing Attitude, Courage, Ekklesia, Fulcrum, Inclusive Church, and the Lesbian and Gay Christian Movement. Exodus International sent a letter on 16 November 2009 to President Museveni stating, "The Christian church ... must be permitted to extend the love and compassion of Christ to all. We believe that this legislation would make this mission a difficult if not impossible task to carry out."

The Anglican Reverend Canon Gideon Byamugisha said that the bill "would become state-legislated genocide".

Following private discussions with the Church of Uganda, the Archbishop of Canterbury Rowan Williams said in a public interview that he did not see how any Anglican could support it.

Divisions emerged within the Anglican community. In response to the Anglican Church of Canada's intervention, Bishop Joseph Abura of the Karamoja Diocese wrote an editorial saying, "Ugandan Parliament, the watch dog of our laws, please go ahead and put the anti-Gay laws in place. It is then that we become truly accountable to our young and to this country, not to Canada or England. We are in charge!" Although the Anglican Church in Uganda opposes the death penalty, its archbishop, Henry Luke Orombi, did not take a position on the bill.

Evangelical organisation Andrew Wommack Ministries declared support for the bill.

Uganda's Catholic Archbishop of Kampala Cyprian Kizito Lwanga stated in December 2009 that the bill was unnecessary and "at odds with the core values" of Christianity, expressing particular concerns at the death penalty provisions. Lwanga argued that instead homosexuals should be encouraged to seek rehabilitation.

Pope Benedict XVI received the Ugandan ambassador in Rome in December 2009 and commended the climate of freedom and respect in the country towards the Catholic Church. During this meeting, there was no mention of the bill. Three days earlier, however, the Vatican legal attaché to the United Nations stated that "Pope Benedict is opposed to 'unjust discrimination' against gay men and lesbians".

On 31 December 2012, a number of events took place across Uganda where the Church of Uganda and evangelical pastors united to condemn homosexuality and call for the passage of the bill, saying passing the bill would save the nation's children from being recruited into the vice. Among those in attendance was United Kingdom (UK)-based evangelical preacher Paul Shinners who commended Uganda for the bill, saying it was a clear stand for God. He said, "There is no other nation world over that has such a plan and through this, Uganda is going to be blessed."

According to a 4 August 2014 news media report, Uganda's top Anglican leader, Archbishop Stanley Ntagali, called the decision of the Constitutional Court a disappointment for the Church of Uganda, religious leaders, and many Ugandans. He said, "The 'court of public opinion' has clearly indicated its support for the Act, and we urge Parliament to consider voting again on the Bill with the proper quorum in place. ... I appeal to all God-fearing people and all Ugandans to remain committed to the support against homosexuality."

=== Criticism of US evangelists ===
Certain US evangelists who are active in Africa have been accused of being responsible for inspiring the bill by inciting hatred by comparing homosexuality to paedophilia and influencing public policy with donations from US religious organisations. Among the critics were The Times, Jeffrey Gettleman in The New York Times, Time, The Guardian, a pan-African internet news journal for social justice named Pambazuka News, and an international organisation with a similar objective named Inter Press Service. (Note: See also editorials addressing US evangelist influence in Africa from Australian newspaper The Age: "It used to be easy to identify homophobia. But now even homophobes fail to recognise their prejudice. Bigotry is reassuringly cosseted by an evangelising rhetoric of love, and reinforced by a medicalising language that veils the savagery of its aims." (Phoon, Adrian [11 January 2010].The role of US evangelists in Uganda's 'kill the gays' bill, The Age. Retrieved 11 January 2010.); openly gay libertarian conservative columnist Andrew Sullivan asked of the evangelists "... now that they have unleashed a proto-fascist pogrom against gay, bi and trans people in Africa, have they finally come to terms with the actual consequences of what they actually believe?" (Sullivan, Andrew [4 January 2010]. American Christianism In Africa, The Daily Dish. Retrieved on 11 January 2010.); a Kenyan journalism professor writing for New America Media wrote of the poverty and still-present effects of colonialism that translates into black Africans' collective feelings of inferiority to whites with money that makes them susceptible to Western influence: "...American evangelicals are going to Africa to satisfy that calling. Is there a better place to create Christian nations than in a continent with nearly 500 million impoverished believers, and easily corruptible governments?" (Okong'o, Edwin [12 January 2010]. Why Ugandans Embrace U.S. Christian Right's Anti-Gay Agenda, New America Media. Retrieved on 12 January 2010.); The Seattle Times wrote, "The three evangelists are an embarrassment to the Christian faith and the values that inspire selfless, hardworking missionaries to work in the far corners of the Earth to help people and truly change their lives." (A malicious blasphemy in Uganda, The Seattle Times [7 January 2010]. Retrieved on 12 January 2010.))

Kaoma said that certain US evangelicals, such as Lively and pastor Warren, have a history of missionary work in Uganda and have become influential in shaping public policy in Uganda and other countries. Kaoma characterized their attempts to portray homosexuals as a threat to the African family as especially egregious, putting people's lives in danger: "When you speak like that, Africans will fight to the death."

Pambazuka News points out that "it costs a considerable amount of money, time and processes to table a private-member's bill" and asks "how the MP from Kabale District [Bahati] is financing this process? It has also been common practice for the mushrooming pastors and churches to use homophobic attacks on opponents as a way to discredit each other and sway faithfuls."

US television host Rachel Maddow ran a continuing segment on the bill, entitled "Uganda Be Kidding Me" on The Rachel Maddow Show. Maddow asserted that Cohen had "blood on [his] hands" for providing the false inspiration for the bill. She has also questioned the truth in Warren's statements when he said in an interview "... it is not my political calling, as a pastor in America, to comment or interfere in the political process of other nations". Maddow highlighted his actions supporting Uganda's break with the Anglican Church for being "pro-gay" and asserted that Warren had contradicted his condemnation of its anti-homosexuality bill.

Lisa Miller in Newsweek likewise cast aspersions on Warren's actions.

=== Public reaction ===
On 22 December 2009, several hundred people gathered in Kampala to show their support for the bill, protesting against homosexuals. Deutsche Presse-Agentur reported, "The protesters, led by born-again clerics, cultural leaders, and university undergraduates, marched to the parliament where they presented a petition."

=== Ugandan government reaction ===
John Nagenda, Senior Presidential Advisor to the president of Uganda, said that he did not think the bill should be passed.

On 11 January 2010, Uganda's Media Centre, a government-sponsored website, released a statement titled "Uganda is being judged too harshly", reacting to the worldwide media attention the country has received about the bill, stating that, in response to the negative press they have received, it is obvious that "Ugandans (read Africans) have no right to discuss and no right to sovereignty". The message asserted "It is unfortunate that Uganda is now being judged on the actions of opportunists whose ideas are based on violence and blackmail and even worse, on the actions of aid attached strings. (Homosexuality). It is regrettable that government is pretentiously expected to observe their 'human rights', yet, by their own actions, they have surrendered their right to human rights."

=== International governments and organizations ===
A US diplomat, whose confidential communiques were exposed through WikiLeaks, wrote that the political and economic problems in Uganda were being channeled into "violent hatred" of gay people and that Bahati, Ssempa, and Buturo were primarily responsible for promoting the wave of intolerance. The diplomat further stated that, even if the bill did not pass, "rampant homophobia in Uganda won't go away".

On 27 November 2009, during the Commonwealth Heads of Government Meeting, Gordon Brown, the prime minister of the UK, expressed his opposition of the bill to President Museveni. Canadian Prime Minister Stephen Harper also expressed opposition privately to Museveni during this meeting. The Canadian Transport Minister John Baird stated to The Globe and Mail, "The current legislation before Parliament in Uganda is vile, it's abhorrent. It's offensive. It offends Canadian values. It offends decency."

Australia's government reiterated its opposition to the criminalisation of homosexuality in The Sydney Morning Herald.

The government of France also criticised the bill, citing a "deep concern".

On 3 December 2009, the Swedish government, which has had a long-term relationship with Uganda, said that it would revoke its US$50 million (£31 million) development aid to Uganda if the bill passed, calling it "appalling". Sweden's Development Assistance Minister Gunilla Carlsson stated that she "thought and hoped we had started to share common values and understanding".

In December 2009, the neighbouring countries of Rwanda and Burundi also discussed legislation that would criminalise homosexuality.

The European Parliament on 16 December 2009 passed a resolution against the bill, with the resolution threatening to cut financial aid to Uganda.

Dirk Niebel, the Federal Minister of Economic Cooperation and Development in Germany, told Deutsche Presse-Agentur that financial aid to Uganda will be cut, with a stepwise plan for this having already been made.

The White House released a statement in December 2009, to The Advocate, stating that US President Barack Obama "strongly opposes efforts, such as the draft law pending in Uganda, that would criminalize homosexuality and move against the tide of history". Secretary of State Hillary Clinton also expressed her opposition to the bill, and US Congress members Tom Coburn, Russ Feingold, Tammy Baldwin, and Ileana Ros-Lehtinen likewise stated theirs.

In December 2009, the city council of Minneapolis, Minnesota, Kampala's sister city, passed a resolution opposing the bill.

In response to the act's passage, western donors have suspended or redirected over US$140 million in aid to Museveni's government. The bulk of the withheld aid was a planned $90 million loan from the World Bank to improve Uganda's health care system. The US, Norway, Denmark, the Netherlands, and Sweden have collectively cut another $50 million in aid to various Ugandan government services.

=== Human rights and non-governmental organizations ===
The United Nations High Commissioner for Human Rights, Navi Pillay, urged Uganda to shelve the bill and decriminalise homosexuality. Elizabeth Mataka, the UN Special Envoy on AIDS in Africa, said that the bill would dissuade people from getting tested for HIV if they could be punished subsequently with the death penalty.

Amnesty International and Human Rights Watch condemned the bill, calling it a product of a campaign by evangelical churches and anti-gay groups that has led to death threats and physical assaults against Ugandans suspected of being gay.

The Global Fund to Fight AIDS, Tuberculosis and Malaria stated that excluding marginalised groups would compromise efforts to stop the spread of AIDS in Uganda where 5.4 percent of the adult population is infected with HIV.

The 16,000 members of the HIV Clinicians Society of Southern Africa sent a letter to the Ugandan president stating, "Encouraging openness and combating stigma are widely recognized as key components of Uganda's successful campaign to reduce HIV infection" and the bill threatens to enact a "profoundly negative impact on Uganda's efforts to combat HIV".

=== News media ===
One of the first newspaper editorials condemning the bill was from the South African paper The Sunday Times, which warned that Uganda was in danger of being "dragged back to the dark and evil days of Idi Amin".

The UK newspaper The Guardian said that the bill confirms the country's status as "unjust and infamous", calling the law a "wretched piece of legislation". London-based newspaper The Times also criticised the proposed law and the BBC for sponsoring a debate titled "Should homosexuals face execution?" The Times stated that the anti-homosexuality bill "... must be seen for what it is: a bigoted and inhumane Bill that will cause suffering for thousands of innocent people".

The Irish Times similarly characterised the bill as "medieval and witch-hunting" and stated that even with the change from the death penalty to life imprisonment, the bill "will remain utterly abhorrent".

An editorial in The New York Times stated, "The United States and others need to make clear to the Ugandan government that such barbarism (in the bill) is intolerable and will make it an international pariah" and chastised evangelicals for stirring hatred: "You can't preach hate and not accept responsibility for the way that hate is manifested."

The Washington Post wrote that the bill was "ugly and ignorant", "barbaric", and "(t)hat it is even being considered puts Uganda beyond the pale of civilized nations".

Douglas A. Foster, writing in The Los Angeles Times, focused on the paradox of the majority of Africans' belief that homosexuality as a Western affectation while simultaneously being influenced by US conservative evangelical dogma. He wrote that gay Africans face an "impossible, insulting, ahistorical, cruel and utterly false choice" of having to choose between being gay and being African.

An editorial in The Australian, said, "It would be wrong ... to believe that the Ugandan case is simply a matter of national self-determination clashing with Western sensibilities", and stated that it is "cultural relativism at play in Uganda, not pluralism that is at the root of human rights violations such as the ones in the proposed legislation there."

The Australian stated, "It is easy to stand up for universal values of liberty against a small nation in east Africa; yet are we prepared to do so against more formidable powers that abuse the human rights of their citizens?"

The Observer, a Ugandan bi-weekly newspaper, printed a response to the international attention the bill received. The newspaper said that homosexuality is not a right, is not included in the UN's Universal Declaration of Human Rights, and in the US, where much of the media attention originated, still remains controversial. It furthermore criticised the disparate reaction to other human rights violations and genocide in Uganda's history that did not attract the same amount of attention. It went on to state "... this is my major discomfort with homosexuality – it is not emerging naturally but rather as a result of intense campaigns in schools, luring people with money and all sorts of falsehoods.... Gays target other people's children because they don't have their own to enlist. Advocates of homosexuality should think about the broader impact of their crusade. Homosexuality destroys man's capacity for procreation, the taste of human life and eventually life itself."

=== Murder of prominent Ugandan gay activist ===
On 26 January 2011, Uganda's most prominent gay activist, David Kato, was bludgeoned to death by Sidney Nsubuga Enoch, who was later convicted and sentenced to 30 years in prison with hard labor.

David Kato's photograph had been published in Rolling Stone. Kato had spoken at a United Nations-sponsored conference on the bill in December 2009, although his words were barely audible because he was nervous. Information in US embassy cables revealed that Ugandan human rights activists and anti-homosexuality bill supporters vocally mocked him during his presentation.

=== LGBT reaction ===
Pride marches occurred in support of LGBT rights.

In 2014, LGBT+ rights activist Pepe Julian Onziema of SMUG denounced the law directly inciting hate crimes, such as violence and murder, against members of the LGBT community.

== Overturning ==
=== Coalition ===
The same year, Onziema "led a successful challenge of Uganda's infamous law that made homosexuality a crime punishable by death." He united 55 Ugandan civil society organizations including parents, educators, and caregivers to "form a coalition to fight the law." CBC Radio reported, "Six months after the bill was passed, Onziema's coalition scored a court victory, striking the law down on a technicality."

=== Review by the Constitutional Court of Uganda ===
On 1 August 2014, the Constitutional Court of Uganda ruled the act invalid as it was not passed with the required quorum. Bahati then announced that the government will appeal to the Supreme Court of Uganda to overturn the ruling. A 13 August 2014 news report, however, said that the Ugandan attorney general had dropped all plans to appeal, per a directive from President Museveni who was concerned about foreign reaction to the act and who also said that any newly introduced bill should not criminalize same-sex relationships between consenting adults.

== Impact ==
According to a report by Sexual Minorities Uganda:

The passing of AHA has given permission to a culture of extreme and violent homophobia whereby both state and non-state actors are free to persecute Uganda's LGBTI people with impunity.

This contributed to a rise of between 750 and 1,900 percent in homophobic incidents compared to previous years. A large number of medical personnel from the UN and other countries have left in protest of the bill.

Parliament later passed a similar Sexual Offences Bill, 2019, but President Museveni vetoed it. The Anti-Homosexuality Bill, 2023 also contained similar provisions; Museveni returned it to parliament for reconsideration, which then passed the bill again largely unamended.

== See also ==
- Anti-Homosexuality Act, 2023
- LGBT rights in Uganda
- LGBT history in Uganda
- Sexual Offences Bill, 2019
- God Loves Uganda
- Human rights in Uganda
- HIV/AIDS in Uganda
- Mark Kiyimba
- Call Me Kuchu
- Russian gay propaganda law
