= Mark Kiyimba =

Ugandan activist

- Citizenship: Uganda
- Occupations: Pastor & Activist
- Known for: Activism
- Title: Director of Unitarian Universalist Church

Mark Kiyimba is a Ugandan Unitarian Universalist minister, social activist and human rights advocate best known for his opposition to the anti-LGBTQ+ legislation in Uganda (LGBT rights in Uganda). He has been recognised internationally for his work in human rights and community support.

== Ministry and community work ==
Mark Kiyimba is the founding minister and director of the Unitarian Universalist Church of Kampala, Uganda, a congregation that emphasizes social justice, inclusivity, and human dignity. The church is involved in community outreach programs, including an orphanage and a school serving children with HIV/AIDS and those who lost their parents to this disease. He also founded a school, New Life Primary School, which has enrolled about 505 children, and they are provided with basic education and values. He started a home for orphans (New Life Children's Home) in Masaka, Uganda.

Under his leadership, the church became a focal point for progressive religious discourse in a society where conservative religious voices often dominated public debates.

== Activism ==
Kiyimba has been a vocal opponent of Uganda's Anti-Homosexuality Bill, publicly criticizing its punitive measures and advocating for the protection of human rights. in 2010, he organized a "Standing on the Side of Love: Reimagining Valentine's Day" as peaceful protest against the bill, which proposed harsh penalties for same-sex relations. His advocacy has taken him beyond Uganda's borders: Kiyimba has traveled Internationally including United States to raise awareness and build alliances with human rights communities abroad in efforts to encounter the bill and support LGBTQ+ rights.

== International recognition ==
In recognition of his efforts in human rights and community leadership, Mark Kiyimba was awarded the 2012 Virginia Uribe Award for Creative Leadership in Human Rights by the National Education Association (NEA) of the United States. This Award honors individuals who exhibit extraordinary leadership in the protection and expansion of human rights.

== Public speaking and engagement ==
Kiyimba has been invited to speak at various International forums. In 2010, he was featured as a guest speaker at Pacific Coast Christian College (PCC) in the United States, where he addressed issues of discrimination and shared his perspective on the implications of anti-homosexuality legislation in Uganda.

== See also ==
- Pepe Julian Onziema
- Evelyn Acham
- LGBT rights in Uganda
- Unitarian Universalism
