= Anti-Homosexuality Act, 2023 =

Ugandan law

Parliament of Uganda
- Long title: An Act to prohibit any form of sexual relations between persons of the same sex; to prohibit the promotion or recognition of sexual relations between persons of the same sex; and for related matters.
- Citation: Act No. 6 of 2023
- Territorial extent: Uganda
- Passed: 21 March 2023
- Assented to by: Yoweri Museveni
- Assented to: 26 May 2023
- Vetoed: 20 April 2023
- Type of veto: Package
- Veto overridden: 2 May 2023
- Commenced: 30 May 2023

Legislative history
- Bill citation: Anti-Homosexuality Bill, 2023
- Introduced by: Asuman Basalirwa (JEEMA)
- Introduced: 3 March 2023
- Committee responsible: Legal and Parliamentary Affairs
- Considered by the Legal and Parliamentary Affairs Committee: 9 March 2023
- Second reading: 21 March 2023
- Third reading: 21 March 2023
- Reconsidered by the after veto: 2 May 2023
- Voting summary: 348 voted for; 1 voted against; 208 absent

Summary
- Under the act, 'aggravated homosexuality' is punishable by death, and 'promotion' (including advocacy of 'normalisation') of homosexuality is punishable by fines and imprisonment for up to 20 years.
- Status: Current legislation

The Anti-Homosexuality Act, 2023 is an act of the Parliament of Uganda that restricts freedom of speech on LGBTQ topics and introduces harsher penalties for certain types of homosexual acts. On 21 March 2023, the bill was read a third time, and was then sent to President Yoweri Museveni for assent. On 21 April 2023, Museveni returned it to Parliament, which passed it again with minor amendments on 2 May. On 26 May, Museveni signed it into law.

The act prescribes life imprisonment for sex between two people of the same biological sex and the death penalty for "aggravated homosexuality". The latter offence includes "serial offenders", same-sex rape, sex in a position of authority or procured by intimidation, sex with persons older than seventy-five, sex with the disabled and mentally ill, and homosexual acts committed by a person with a previous conviction of homosexuality. Further, under its provisions, the promotion (including normalisation) of homosexuality is punishable by imprisonment for up to 20 years and fines.

The United States, United Kingdom, Canada, Germany, and the European Union, and several local and international NGOs have condemned it.

== Background ==
=== Anti-Homosexuality Act of 2014 ===
In December 2013, the Parliament of Uganda passed an act prohibiting sexual relations between persons of the same sex. The act was previously called the "Kill the Gays bill" in the western mainstream media due to death penalty clauses proposed in the original version, but the penalty was later amended to life imprisonment. The bill was signed into law by the President of Uganda Yoweri Museveni on 24 February 2014. On 1 August 2014, however, the Constitutional Court of Uganda ruled the act invalid on procedural grounds.

=== Sexual Offences Bill of 2021 ===
In May 2021, the Parliament of Uganda passed a bill that consolidated a number of previous laws regarding sexual offences, introduced some provisions toward addressing sexual violence, and criminalised same-sex relationships. The bill was vetoed by President Museveni on 18 August 2021, who suggested much of its content is already covered by existing legislation.

== Provisions and passage ==
=== Bill as introduced ===
On 28 February 2023, parliament granted Asuman Basalirwa leave to introduce the Anti-Homosexuality Bill. The memorandum to the bill stated that its object was to 'establish a comprehensive and enhanced legislation to protect the traditional family' by

- prohibition of same-sex sexual relations and their 'promotion or recognition',
- strengthening measures to 'deal with emerging...threats to the traditional, heterosexual family',
- 'protecting [Ugandan culture from] sexual rights activists seeking to impose their values of sexual promiscuity', and
- 'protecting children and youth who are made vulnerable to sexual abuse through homosexuality and related acts'.

The memorandum further said that the bill sought to address 'gaps' in existing legislation, which did not clearly provide for 'charging, investigating, prosecuting, convicting and sentencing' of offenders under then existing prohibitions of homosexuality.

The bill, as introduced:

- defined 'the offence of homosexuality' to include various forms of gay sex, 'touch[ing] another person with the intention of committing the act of homosexuality', and 'hold[ing] out as a lesbian, gay, transgender, a queer, or any other sexual or gender identity that is contrary to the binary categories of male and female';
- provided for ten years' imprisonment on conviction of the 'offence of homosexuality';
- defined the 'offence of aggravated homosexuality' to be committed by A when A has gay sex with B and A has HIV, A is a guardian or parent of B, A has authority or control over B, B has a disability, A is a serial offender, or A causes B to use any thing 'with intent to stupefy or overpower' B 'to enable any person to have unlawful carnal connection with any person of the same sex';
- provided for ten years' imprisonment on conviction for the 'offence of aggravated homosexuality', and HIV tests for persons so charged;
- provided for two years' imprisonment for attempts to commit 'the offence of homosexuality' and ten years' in the case of 'aggravated homosexuality';
- excluded punishment of 'victim[s] of homosexuality' for their 'involvement in homosexuality', and orders for compensation from persons convicted;
- excluded consent as a defence to homosexuality;
- required proceedings under the act to be held in camera when involving children or so ordered by the court;
- prohibited publication of information tending to identify the victim without either their or the court's permission and provided for punishment of two hundred and fifty currency points (then USh 5,000,000 or approximately $1300);
- prohibited the 'aid[ing], abet[ting], counsel[ling] or procur[ing] [of] another person to engage in acts of homosexuality' and provided for punishment, 'detention with intent to commit homosexuality', and 'conspiracy' to 'induce another person of the same sex...to have unlawful carnal knowledge' by 'fraudulent means', and provided for punishment of both by two years' imprisonment;
- prohibited the 'procuring [of] homosexuality by threats' and provided for punishment by five years' imprisonment;
- prohibited the keeping of brothels 'for purposes of homosexuality' by and provided for punishment by seven years' imprisonment, and provided for encouragement of others to be present in any premises for the purpose of gay sex to be punishable by one year's imprisonment;
- prohibited 'purport[ing]' to enter a same-sex marriage and provided for punishment by ten years' imprisonment;
- prohibited the conducting of a ceremony in that connection with up to ten years' imprisonment;
- prohibited 'promotion of homosexuality', including publication, funding, or offering premises, and provided for punishment by fine of five thousand currency points (then US 100 million or approximately $25,000) or five years' imprisonment or both; and
- permitted courts to make rehabilitation orders or protection orders 'if satisfied that a child is likely to engage in acts of homosexuality'.

=== Consideration in committee ===
On 9 March 2023, the bill was referred to the Committee on Legal and Parliamentary Affairs of parliament. The committee was divided. Two members, Fox Odoi-Oywelowo and Paul Kwizera Bucyana, issued a minority report, dissenting from the majority of thirty members.

The majority found that 'the prohibition against homosexuality is entrenched in the laws of Uganda and our cherished and shared cultural norms and values.' It found that the media had 'recently been awash with reports of sodomy and lesbianism in Ugandan schools' and that 'grooming and recruitment of school children into homosexuality has taken shape in Uganda'. It further found that 'a number of non-governmental organisations have been found to promote the normalisation of same sex relations'. Chapter Four Uganda, which submitted evidence to the committee, said to the BBC that "[w]hether you're heterosexual or homosexual, the government and parliament should introduce laws, or at least implement existing laws that protect all children – boys, girls from defilement. So the issue of recruitment has been unproven, it is baseless, it is biased."

In evidence submitted to the committee, several NGOs and legal academics submitted that the provisions of the bill were either unconstitutional or redundant. The Director of Public Prosecutions submitted that the provisions of the bill should be made as amendments to the Penal Code to avoid fragmentation of the statute book. The majority responded that '[h]omosexuality is a unique offence', and cited the example of legislation specially dealing with terrorism and corruption. The majority further found section 145 of the Penal Code to be inadequate. It found that it failed to prohibit oral sex or use of "contraption[s]" other than "sexual organ[s]", did not define "carnal knowledge" and "the order of nature", failed to prohibit identification as transgender, queer, or LGBTQ, and failed to prohibit "promotion of same sex sexual acts", allowing LGBTQ advocacy.

The minority dissented on this point. It said that many of the acts above were prohibited by section 145 read with the 'general prohibition on conspiracies under Chapter XLI of the Penal Code...(conspiracy to commit felony, conspiracy to commit misdemeanor[sic] and other conspiracies)', and the same case the majority later used to justify the criminalisation of homosexuality as a demonstration that existing legislation provided for 'acts that tend to promote homosexuality'. The minority considered the bill, therefore, be unnecessary, and suggested that 'anti-homosexual sentiment' without clear evidence had motivated its introduction.

The minority further argued that the interaction of the bill with other legislation was undesirable. In particular, sections 2 or 3 prohibiting the 'offence of homosexuality' and 'offence of aggravated homosexuality' effectively duplicated provisions of the Penal Code prohibiting rape and defilement but weakened the penalty from death or life imprisonment to ten years' imprisonment.

On other evidence, the bill was unconstitutional or contravened human rights. The majority found that international human rights law did not supersede 'the supreme law of Uganda', viz., the constitution, and suggested that prohibition of homosexuality was in the 'public interest'. It cited the proscription of a workshop by the High Court on the gay rights and its justification in the name of 'national security and public order and public interest[sic]'.

The minority dissented on this point too. It said that criminalisation of homosexuality 'denies...equal protection under the law' and creates 'harsh differential treatment'. In particular, the minority held that

- the inclusion of HIV status under the definition of 'aggravated homosexuality' wrongly assumed that HIV precluded safe sex and that disabled people would invariably be victims;
- section 5(1) amounted to an introduction of the gay panic defence; and
- the definition of 'touching' as 'constituting' homosexuality, and reference to 'aiding and abetting' homosexuality were unconstitutionally vague. The minority also said that the bill would criminalise appearances and not 'prohibited conduct'.

The committee received evidence on the question of whether homosexuality was 'a result of nature or nurture'. The majority held that 'homosexuality is mainly an acquired and learnt sexual practice, with little or no influence from nature', except for a few genetically caused cases of 'unusual expressions of physical phenotypic expression associated with the genital organs'.

In its analysis of the bill, the majority was concerned that sections 1 and 2 gave differing definitions of homosexuality. For example, section 1 would not require 'penetration of the anus or mouth' but section 2 would. Neither provision would supersede the definition of 'unnatural offences' in the Penal Code. The majority suggested that these conflicting definitions could lead to unconstitutional vagueness. It, therefore, proposed harmonisation of each of the definitions.

The majority further found that the 'offence of aggravated homosexuality' was redundant in that the sentence proposed was the same, and that the elements of the offence were undefined; it proposed remedying both. It further found that the bill should be amended to define 'victims' for the purposes of section 5, and proposed the deletion of the provision excluding punishment of 'victim[s] of homosexuality' for their 'involvement in homosexuality'.

The majority further recommended the prohibition of 'activities by civil society organisations that are intended to normalise acts and conduct that normalises conduct that is banned or unlawful in Uganda', as an amendment to the existing text. It proposed that 'grooming of persons to engage in homosexuality' should be prohibited, and that such provision should 'cater for all the methods through which homosexuality...[is] promoted, including in academic institutions'.

The majority recommended 'different penalties for children offenders', the deletion of offences 'based on...appearance' without reference to conduct, and further definition of 'gender' and sex'.

The minority recommended the drafting of a 'comprehensive non-discriminatory sexual offences Bill[sic]'.

The majority proposed a number of textual amendments.

- Section 2 was amended to provide for imprisonment for life for homosexuality, and seven years' imprisonment for 'attempts'. It further was amended to provide for the submission of evidence by a medical practitioner of evidence 'that the accused person...suffer[ed] genetic abnormalities which might have contributed to the acts that constitute the offence of homosexuality.'
- Section 3 was amended to provide for the death penalty for 'aggravated homosexuality', in broadly similar cases, but amended the reference to HIV status to refer instead to the contraction by the other party of 'a terminal illness', newly included sex with persons over the age of seventy-five, and generally included sex with people who were 'unconscious or in an altered state of consciousness due to the influence of...any...substance that impaired...judgment'. It provided for 'attempts' to be punishable by fourteen years, and the same provision as to genetic abnormalities above.
- A new section was inserted to provide for three years' imprisonment in the case of children.
- Section 5(1) on the exclusion of punishment of 'victims' of homosexuality was deleted.
- An offence of 'grooming' was introduced', punishable by up to ten years' imprisonment. It included recruitment or transportation of a child to facilitate sex (only gay sex), distribution of gay pornography to children, and gay sex in the presence of a child.
- Section 13 was amended to additionally prohibit knowing attendance of or participation in gay marriage.
- Section 14 was amended to redefine 'promotion of homosexuality' to include direct encouragement of gay sex or publication of material 'promoting or encouraging homosexuality or the commission of an offence' under the bill, and 'normalisation of' offences under the Bill, as well as financial support or organisation to that end. It further provided for a court to find shareholders, directors and employees of legal entities convicted of 'promotion of homosexuality' to be convicted in turn and liable to punishment. It also inserted a provision for a fine of up to twenty thousand currency points (then USh 400 million or approximately $100,000) and the suspension or cancellation of licences to operate in Uganda.
- A new section was inserted to provide for disqualification of persons convicted of 'homosexuality or aggravated homosexuality' from employment 'in a position of authority or care of a child or vulnerable person'.
- A new section was inserted to create an offence of failing to report offences under the bill, punishable by a fine of five thousand currency points (then USh 100 million or approximately $25,000) or six months' imprisonment.
- A new section was inserted to create an offence of making false or misleading allegations of offences under the bill, punishable by one year's imprisonment.

=== Final passages ===
Parliament agreed to suspend certain rules to pass the bill without delay. As a result, the last two readings were approved on 21 March by voice vote. The number of MPs present during the debate was 389, which was enough to constitute a quorum. Fox Odoi-Oywelowo and Paul Kwizera Bucyana, who presented the minority report, were the only two MPs to openly oppose the proposal. After the debate, Odoi said that he had been "permitted…as a minority member to have [his] say the majority have had their way and that's how democracy works", while Speaker Anita Among praised the passage of the draft law and 'thank[ed] [her]self for taking a bold decision'. The National Resistance Movement Chief Whip, Denis Obua, said that foreign states should not 'impose...foreign customs'. Following discussions on the avoidance of duplication of provisions of the Penal Code, the Deputy Attorney General, Jackson Kafuuzi, said that the government was prepared to support the bill.

=== Provisions of the bill as passed ===
The version of the bill which Parliament passed on 21 March contained the following provisions:

- The maximum penalty for homosexual acts is life imprisonment, while the maximum penalty for attempted homosexual acts is imprisonment for 10 years. Furthermore, people convicted of homosexuality or attempted homosexuality cannot be employed in childcare facilities even after release.
- The maximum penalty for "aggravated homosexuality" is death, while the maximum penalty for attempted "aggravated homosexuality" is imprisonment for 14 years. Furthermore, people convicted of aggravated homosexuality or attempted aggravated homosexuality cannot be employed in childcare facilities even after release. Aggravated homosexuality is defined as sexual intercourse with a person older than 75 or younger than 18, a person not consenting or unable to consent, or a disabled or mentally ill person. Serial offenders (meaning those who were convicted of homosexuality multiple times) are also defined as "aggravated homosexuals".
- The maximum penalty for minors convicted of homosexuality is imprisonment for 3 years.
- The maximum penalty for knowingly renting premises to people who wish to engage in homosexual acts on such a premise is imprisonment for 10 years.
- The maximum penalty for promoting homosexuality is imprisonment for 20 years.
- The maximum penalty for sharing homosexual pornography with a minor is imprisonment for 20 years.
- The maximum penalty for recruitment or transportation of a child to facilitate homosexual sex is imprisonment for life.
- The maximum penalty for "purporting to contract a same-sex marriage", as well as for knowingly attending a purported same-sex marriage ceremony is imprisonment for 10 years.
- The maximum penalty for failing to report a witnessed homosexual act is imprisonment for 6 months. Lawyers acting in their official capacity are exempt from this provision.
- The maximum penalty for falsely accusing another person of homosexuality is imprisonment for 1 year.

=== President's returning of the bill to parliament for reconsideration ===
On 20 April, Agence France-Presse reported that the law officers had advised the President, Yoweri Museveni, not to assent to the bill. NTV Uganda further reported that the parliamentary caucus of the ruling National Resistance Movement had called upon the President to return the bill to parliament for redrafting, which Museveni did on the same day. More specifically, Museveni asked Parliament to clarify that homosexual 'proclivities' do not constitute an offence if not acted upon and to remove the obligation to report acts of homosexuality.

=== Revision by parliament ===
On 2 May, Parliament passed the bill again by a vote of 348 to 1, with Fox Odoi-Oywelowo being the only MP to vote against. Paul Kwizera, who had previously voiced his opposition to the bill, voted in favour this time, after being pressured by some of his constituents to do so. The death penalty for aggravated homosexuality was retained, but under the new draft mere identification as LGBTQ is not criminalised and the obligation to report a homosexual act applies only if said act involved a vulnerable person, with the maximum penalty for not reporting increased from six months to five years.

=== Enactment ===
On 29 May, it was announced that President Museveni had signed the bill into law.

=== Prosecution under the law ===
In August 2023, a 20-year-old man became the first person prosecuted for "aggravated homosexuality" under the law, for which he faces the death penalty. The man's lawyer, Justine Balya, confirmed that he will remain in custody until his case is heard by the High Court, given it was a capital offense. Several others have been arrested since the law's passage for allegedly engaging in same-sex activity.

== Summary ==
Provision(s)	Scope
Section 1 and Schedule 1	Provide for definitions.
Section 2	Creates the offence of homosexuality, punishable by up to life imprisonment.; Creates the offence of attempted homosexuality, punishable by imprisonment for up to 10 years.
Section 3	Creates the offence of aggravated homosexuality, punishable by death. 'Aggravated homosexuals' are defined as people who: engage in homosexual intercourse with a person older than 75; engage in homosexual rape; engage in homosexual intercourse with children; engage in homosexual intercourse with a disabled or mentally ill person; leave another person disabled or mentally ill as a result of homosexual intercourse they had with that person, or; have been convicted of homosexuality more than once.; Creates the offence of attempted aggravated homosexuality, punishable by imprisonment for up to 14 years.
Section 4	Establishes that the maximum penalty for children convicted of homosexuality or attempted homosexuality is imprisonment for up to 3 years.
Section 5	Provides for the 'protection, assistance and payment of compensation to victims of homosexuality'.
Section 6	Reiterates that consent to an homosexual act does not constitute a defence.
Section 7	Prohibits making the identity of a victim of homosexual rape public without the consent of the victim or of a court of law, with a penalty of imprisonment for up to 3 years.
Section 8	Makes sharing homosexual pornographic material with a child an offence punishable by imprisonment for up to 20 years.; Makes recruitment or transportation of a child to facilitate homosexual sex and offence punishable by up to imprisonment for life.
Section 9	Makes it illegal to knowingly rent premises to people who wish to engage in homosexual acts on such premises, under the penalty of imprisonment for up to 7 years.
Section 10	Makes purporting to contract a same-sex marriage or attending a purported same-sex marriage an offence punishable by imprisonment for up to 10 years.
Section 11	Makes promotion of homosexuality an offence punishable by imprisonment for up to 20 years.; Allows Courts to order the suspension or cancellation of the licenses of organizations which promote homosexuality.
Section 12	Prevents people with a conviction of homosexuality from working in childcare institutions.
Section 13	Makes failure to disclose a previous conviction of homosexuality when applying to work in a childcare institution an offence punishable by imprisonment for up to 2 years.
Section 14	Mandates that any person who knows or reasonably suspects someone of committing and offense shall report the matter to the police. Makes it an offence, punishable by imprisonment for up to 5 years, for a person not to report a homosexual act they know or reasonably suspect to have taken place, if said act involved a 'vulnerable person'; the latter term is defined as 'a person who is in need of special protection because of age, sex, illness, physical or mental disability, social or personal status or other status, including a refugee, an internally-displaced person, a stateless person and an asylum seeker, a victim of sex-based violence, an illustrate person or elderly person'. Section 14 does not apply to lawyers acting in their official capacity.
Section 15	Prohibits making a false allegation of homosexuality, under the penalty of imprisonment for up to 1 year.
Section 16	Grants courts the power to order social services to "rehabilitate" a convicted homosexual.
Section 17	Grants the Minister for Ethics and Integrity the power to make secondary legislation to better carry out the Act.

== Judicial proceedings ==
Following the act's enactment, the Constitutional Court received four petitions and nineteen applications against the act, which Justice Geoffrey Kiryabwire ordered to be consolidated at the attorney general's suggestion on 28 October. On 11 December, the applicants finalised their submissions. In April 2024, the Constitutional Court issued a ruling which upheld most of the substantive aspects of the law, with the exceptions of provisions criminalizing the rental of premises for "homosexual purposes" and the failure to report certain homosexual activities to the police. On 11 July 2024, an appeal to the Supreme Court against the decision of the Constitutional Court was filed.

== Reactions ==
=== Prior to enactment ===
When asked about the Ugandan bill on 25 January 2023, Pope Francis stated that homosexual behaviour, while sinful, should not be criminalised.

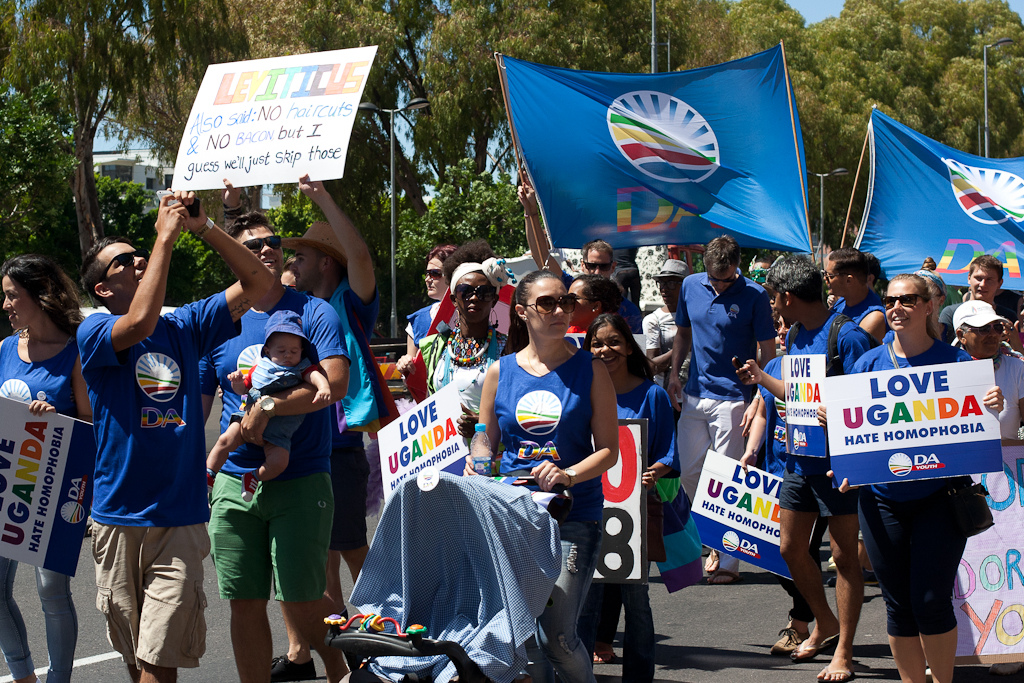
Demonstrators against the Anti-Homosexuality Act at Cape Town Pride, South Africa, in March 2014

In March 2023, Frank Mugisha, head of Sexual Minorities Uganda, said that the bill could lead to homelessness and loss of access to healthcare. Chapter Four Uganda said that the bill did 'not meet constitutional and international human rights standards'; it said that it 'condemn[ed] all forms of sexual violence against children and adults, no matter the sexual orientation or gender identity of the perpetrator', and called on Parliament to take a 'human rights compliant approach'.

The Regional Director for East and Southern Africa of Amnesty International said that the President should veto the bill, which amounted to "a grave assault on LGBTI people" and was "contemptuous of the Ugandan constitution"; he further called it "ambiguous" and "vaguely worded". Volker Türk, High Commissioner for Human Rights of the United Nations, made similar calls. According to Türk, the bill was "discriminatory" and "probably among the worst of its kind in the world", "confuse[d] consensual and non-consensual relations", the former of which "should never be criminalized", and the latter of which should be prohibited without reference to gender or sexual orientation, and conflicted with Uganda's constitution and international obligations.

The United States, United Kingdom, Canada, Germany, and the European Union denounced the bill. John Kirby, spokesman for the US national security council, said that the US government would consider economic and financial repercussions.

In April 2023, the Economic Freedom Fighters, South Africa's third largest political party, condemned the bill and held a protest outside of the Ugandan High Commission in South Africa calling on other African countries to unite against the bill's enactment. South Africa's second-largest party, the Democratic Alliance, also condemned the bill and called on the South African government to show solidarity with Uganda's gay community.

On 19 April 2023, the European Parliament passed by a vote of 416 to 62, with 38 abstentions, a resolution concerning LGBTQ rights which included a formal condemnation of the Ugandan Anti-Homosexuality Bill, 2023. Most of the votes against were cast by right-wing MEPs from Hungary, Italy, and Poland, and came as a result of the text of the resolution accusing the aforementioned countries of being anti-LGBTQ. The provisions condemning Uganda, meanwhile, were nearly universally supported by MEPs from all parties and from all member states.

In April 2023, The Lancet reported that even though the bill had not yet come into force, it had already had an effect on people's access to health services, with some health workers refusing to serve homosexual people out of fear they would be prosecuted once the new proposed penalties had come into force.

On 19 May, the Italian Senate passed by unanimous consent a motion condemning the Ugandan bill.

=== Following enactment ===
On 29 May, United States President Joe Biden condemned the law, calling it "a tragic violation of universal human rights" and "the latest development in an alarming trend of human rights abuses and corruption in Uganda". This sentiment was echoed by United States Senator Ted Cruz, who tweeted: "Any law criminalizing homosexuality or imposing the death penalty for 'aggravated homosexuality' is grotesque and an abomination. All civilized nations should join together in condemning this human rights abuse". British Minister for Development and Africa Andrew Mitchell strongly criticised the law, referring to it as "deeply discriminatory".

On 9 June, Justin Welby, the Archbishop of Canterbury, wrote to the Primate and Archbishop of Uganda, Stephen Kaziimba, to express his 'grief and dismay at the Church of Uganda's support for the Anti-Homosexuality Act.' Welby wrote that despite disagreement in the Anglican Communion 'over matters of sexuality', Anglicans had a long-established position against the criminalisation of homosexuality.

In August 2023, the World Bank announced it would halt lending to Uganda in response to the new law. The financial institution noted that the act "fundamentally contradicts the World Bank Group's values."

In October 2023, United States President Joe Biden announced that Uganda would be expelled from the group of sub-Saharan African countries that benefit from tax breaks provided under the United States African Growth and Opportunity Act (AGOA) because of the country's "gross violations of internationally recognized human rights" which violate AGOA eligibility criteria.

== See also ==
- Sexual Offences Bill, 2019
- Anti-Homosexuality Act, 2014
- LGBTQ rights in Uganda
