= Fox Odoi-Oywelowo =

Ugandan politician

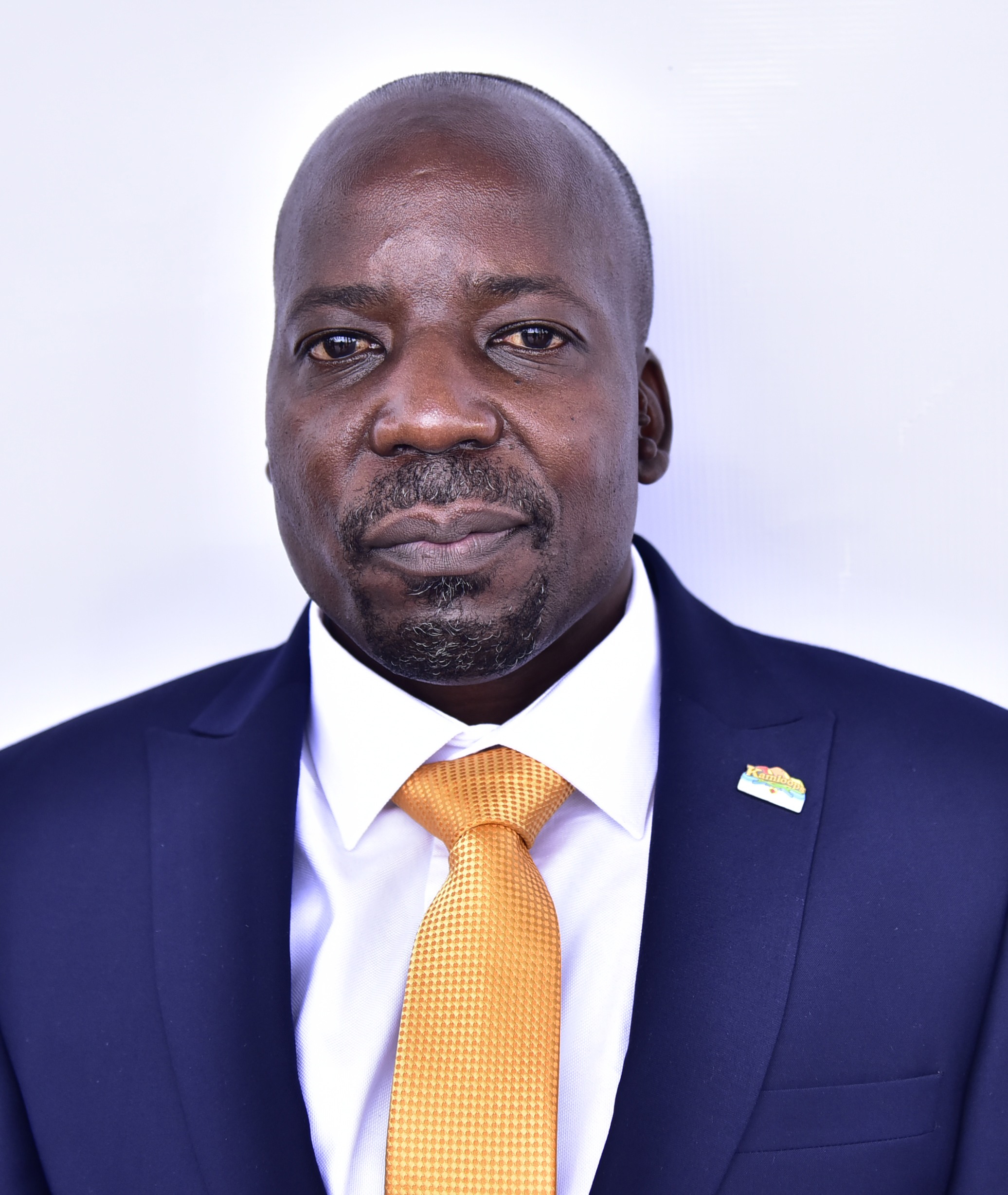
- Born: 23 December 1968 (age 57)
- Occupations: Advocate, legislator
- Years active: 1993–present

Fox Odoi-Oywelowo is a Ugandan advocate and legislator. Odoi-Oywelowo is a former senior legal counsel to the president of Uganda Yoweri Museveni.

On 14 January 2021, Fox Odoi-Oywelowo was elected as a member of Uganda's Eleventh Parliament representing the West Budama North East constituency. In June, he took over leadership of the Human Rights Committee of the Parliament of Uganda. An avid human rights advocate and defender, he vows to hold every institution accountable for human rights violations. In 2023, he was the only MP to vote against the Anti-Homosexuality Act.

== Early life and education ==
Fox Odoi-Oywelowo was born on 23 December 1968 in West Budama, in the East of Uganda. He went to Manjasi High School before joining St Peter's College, Tororo, where he completed his high school. Fox Odoi-Oywelowo later enrolled at Makerere University where he pursued bachelor's degree in law (LLB Hons), graduating in 1992. Between 1992 and 1993, he pursued a post-graduate diploma in legal practice, graduating in 1993. In 2018, he earned a Master of Laws, International Business Law, from Uganda Christian University.

== Legal career ==
Fox Odoi-Oywelowo started out as Personal Assistant to Justice J.P. Berko (Ghanaian Expatriate Judge) on an overseas Development Agency/ Judiciary Assistance Programme before serving as a legal assistant in a private law firm in Kampala.

He joined the State House Legal Department in 1995 and became the head of the department in 1996. Between 1996 and 1998, Fox Odoi-Oywelowo was part of the investigation Team into Effective Strength of the Uganda Peoples’ Defence Forces (UPDF). The team probed the presence of ‘ghost’ soldiers on the pay rolls of the UPDF. In 1999, he led a State House special audit team into the Uganda Revenue Authority (URA), to probe tax evasion. The audit led to the introduction of systems aimed at the prevention of dumping transit goods. The audit also introduced better transit goods convoy management and re-export verification and documentation.

Fox Odoi-Oywelowo is also a consummate constitutional law practitioner and has filed several constitutional petitions that have improved on the jurisprudence of Uganda. A Locus Classicus of Fox Odoi-Oywelowo and James Akampumuza V Attorney General is taught in all law schools in Uganda.

From 2000 to 2010, Odoi-Oywelowo was the head of prosecutions for Uganda People's Defence Forces unit, the Presidential Protection Unit (PPU) that later transformed into the Presidential Guard Brigade (PGB) which is currently Special Forces Command (SFC).

While at State House, he was also appointed a member of the Expanded Committee of Inquiry into the causes of the clashes between the Uganda Peoples’ Defense Forces (UPDF) and the Rwanda Patriotic Front (RPF) in Kisangani.

In 2010, Odoi-Oywelowo joined the Directorate of Civil Litigation in Uganda's Justice and Constitutional Affairs Ministry, serving as senior principal state attorney.

He continues to practice law as an advocate of the Courts of Judicature having enrolled in 1998.

== Legislative career ==
In 2011, Fox Odoi-Oywelowo was elected as a member of the Ninth Parliament of Uganda, representing the West Budama North constituency. While in parliament, he was chairman of the Committee on Rules, Privileges and Discipline. He also served as member of the Legal and Parliamentary Affairs Committee and the Budget Committee. Fox Odoi-Oywelowo was on 14 January 2021, re-elected to the Parliament of Uganda to represent the West Budama North East constituency, winning a seat as a member of the ruling National Resistance Movement (NRM) party. He is the first member of Parliament to represent the constituency that was curved out of West Budama North constituency in 2020.

During his 2011–2016 tenure, Fox Odoi-Oywelowo was among advocates who challenged Uganda's anti-gay law both in parliament and the Constitutional Court. As a result, the Constitutional Court declared the anti-gay law unconstitutional. As a member of Parliament, Fox Odoi-Oywelowo advocated for the abolition of the death penalty and sought the permission of parliament together with others to introduce a private member's bill for this purpose. He also advocated for the legalisation of abortion and the introduction of safe abortion clinics as the only practical way to save the lives of thousands of mothers lost to unsafe abortion practices.

In 2023, Odoi-Oywelowo was the only MP to vote against the Anti-Homosexuality Bill, 2023. He was mocked by fellow lawmakers and accused of receiving money to promote what they perceived as "Western immorality".

Odoi-Oywelowo lost his seat in the 2026 election.

== Personal life ==
Fox Odoi-Oywelowo is married and has four children. He is a practising Roman Catholic.
