= Frank Odoi =

Frank Odoi may refer to:

- Frank Odoi (footballer)
- Frank Odoi (cartoonist)
