= George Lugalambi =

George Lugalambi is a media development specialist and researcher, and the executive director at the African Centre for Media Excellence (ACME). He was appointed to this position in July 2022, succeeding Peter Mwesige.

== Education ==
Lugalambi holds a Doctor of Philosophy (PhD) in Communication from the University of South Africa, where he attained his doctorate in journalism and mass communication in 2006.

== Career ==
Lugalambi was a journalist and newspaper editor of The Crusader. He also is on the panel of judges for the Uganda National Journalism Awards.

In 1993, after graduation, Lugalambi started teaching at Makerere University. He later promoted to senior lecturer in 2007 after attaining a doctorate in 2006. Between 2008 and 2011, he was the head of the Department of Journalism and Communication at the university.

From mid-2011 to early 2017, he was the manager of the Capacity Development Programme for strengthening media oversight of the extractive sectors of oil, gas, and mining at the Natural Resource Governance Institute. He contributed to Global Muckrakers in 2014 and co-edited Africa Muckraking in 2017. In 2023, he was appointed the new president of Rotary Club Muyenga Tank Hill. Lugalambi also coordinates the Uganda Media Sector Working Group (UMSWG) that was formed in 2022.

Lugalambi has been a judge on the panel of judges for the Uganda National Journalism Awards for several years.

== Criminal charges ==
While working at The Crusader, he was arrested and detained overnight at the Kampala Central Police Station on 17 December 1998. He was charged before the Presiding Magistrate Jane Alividza at the Kampala Magistrate Court with promoting sectarianism which is contrary to section 42 a (i) (d) of the Penal Code Act as amended by Statute 9 of 1988.
