= LGBTQ history in Uganda =

Uganda has a very long and, quite permissive, and sometimes violent history regarding the LGBT community, stretching back from the pre-colonial period, through British colonial control, and even after independence.

During precolonial times, the “mudoko dako,” or effeminate males among the Langi of northern Uganda were treated as women and could marry men. Religious roles for cross-dressing men were historically found among the Bunyoro people. The Teso people also acknowledged a category of men who dressed as women. However, it is worth to point out that a man dressing as a woman was not an indication of his sexual orientation. Kabaka Mwanga II, who ruled in the latter half of the 19th century, was bisexual. Homosexuality in Uganda was criminalized in 1902.

== Pre-colonial history of LGBTQ in Uganda ==
Studies of the Ugandan Kingdom of Buganda highlight that while nonconforming sexualities may have been frowned upon they were not criminalized until western imperialism permeated the continent and introduced state laws that sanctioned against homophobia in the form of religious laws, leading to a shift in societal norms and attitudes towards nonconforming sexualities. Before the British invasion it appears that pre-colonial Uganda accepted a certain expression outside of the heteronormative paradigm.

Historian Jack Driberg observed that some males amongst a group of agriculturalists north of Lake Kwania in Uganda were called “Mudoko Daka and treated as women but could carry as men.” Colonial and post-colonial ethno-graphics texts suggest the existence of same-sex social and sexual relationships among several different Ugandan ethnic groups such as the Langi, The Iteso, The Baganda, The Bahima, and the Bunyoro which was quite common and practiced by other pastoral people groups.

The tension between religion and homosexuality in Uganda traces back to the contested historical event involving Buganda Kabaka (King) Mwanga and the Christian Martyrs. Mwanga the II ascended the throne in 1884 at the age of 17 and ruled from 1884 to 1897. He inherited a court that was sharply polarized between two different religious factions, each which stood in varying degrees of alliance with external powers vying for influence and encroaching on Buganda in the intense scramble for Africa.In 1886 Mwanga II executed forty-five of his male subjects/ pages, either by burning or beheading who become the Christian Martyrs. According to some historical accounts were executed by Mwanga in 1886, for refusing the sexual advance because of their newly adopted religion of Catholicism that “Taught that homosexuality was an abomination”.

Neville Hoard emphasizes that written records only indicated that the series of actions were considered abhorrent to missionaries and colonial administrators to the point that they were unmentionable. A British Roman Catholic Priest recounted the testimony of a Baganda man named Kiwanuka that at the time “The King practiced the works of Sodom”. Common popular belief is that Pagans and Muslims were prepared to do those things with the king. But Catholics absolutely refused. Hence the murder of the Catholic young men, Historian John Blevins notes that there is no historical evidence that suggests that Kabaka aligned himself with Islam. In his perspective, Islam was seen in a similar light as Christianity which was that of a threat “Mwanga’s father, Kabaka Mutesa, ordered the execution of over seventy Muslim converts and thousands of his people just a decade before Mwanga executed the Christian converts.” So with this perspective the Kabaka would not have learned his unnatural vice from Muslims because the Baganda court was not closely allied with Islam. Further Catholic theologian J.F. Faupel emphasizes Kabaka’s sexuality referring to the Kabaka’s “abominable vices', 'unnatural passion', 'works of Sodom', 'shameful proposals', 'unnatural lust’ and ‘evil purpose’, that allegedly haunted the corridors of power, but also more specifically to ‘the vice of sodomy’ and ‘the practice of homosexuality’, to which ‘Mwanga was an addict long before he succeeded to the throne.” Thus, it was not something that he had learned from Islam, which provides evidence of pre-existing same-sex relationships present in Uganda.

Ugandan scholar Sawmill-Lwanga-Lunyiigo stated that these were accusations thrown against the Kabaka because he surrounded himself with many unmarried young men. In his view “Mwanga had no shortage of buxom girls from Buganda and Busagala (Nkore)... so homosexuality was used to make him appear despicable to the Baganda.” Missionaries sought to tarnish the king's name and reputation by using homosexuality as a tool, particularly because of his refusal to undergo baptism.

== Attitudes Under Colonial Rule ==
Before Uganda was officially created by the British empire, there was not much opposition to LGBT in the region. However, once the British empire conquered and claimed the land, they introduced legislation that banned homosexuality. The new laws forced their views and ideologies onto the people living in Uganda. Britain already had strict laws that deemed same sex relationships between men as sinful, and later it would become completely illegal. For women this was the opposite, there was an unwillingness to represent women. No laws were passed to criminalise female same sex relationships, however it was still frowned upon. The same rules applied in Uganda. Women were left alone while the men were severely punished for same sex relationships. They risked being executed if caught and the soldiers working in the colonies would not hesitate to kill a man if there were rumours about homosexuality. These laws completely changed the way of life that they knew.

Britain posed a new political framework onto the kingdoms that became Uganda. One of these kingdoms was Buganda. Their leader Mwanga was openly a part of the LGBT community. However, once the British took over, he was forced into exile alongside other leaders, like Kintu, because of their beliefs. During his exile in Seychelles Island, He was forced to be baptised as a protestant, but he did fight against the British for the rights of his people. The British used this as a form of control over the land, and over the people. By striking fear into those who lived there, and taking down their leader. It meant that hopefully less people would try and object to what they were doing. Many of the other kingdoms that existed also allowed homosexuality, with many historians, such as Joanna Quinn, saying that it was a traditional part of African culture. Britain forced them to become Ugandan and follow new laws, which meant that LGBT people were criminalised.

Britain was aiming to profit from Uganda, and the resources it had but in order to do so they needed to have authority. Uganda was under British rule, meaning that many of their laws were the same, laws surrounding LGBT were not different. As the years went on, people began to agree with the British way of thinking, this was due to the fact that they had been oppressed for their entire lives so homophobia had always been a part of their lives. It was written into the laws, but also into the minds of the upcoming generations. The colonists imposed legislations and ideologies meant LGBT once widely accepted and very common, was a crime. The effects of colonial rule were significant throughout the twentieth century and the legacies including homophobic legislation and could still be seen in the present.

== Contemporary Attitudes ==
The struggle for members of the LGBT community has continued, as the National Resistance Movement government progressively push harder for more severe punishments for gay people and/or anyone involved in the community.

In 2009, Ugandan member of parliament David Bahati introduced a bill which was soon dubbed by the media as the gay death penalty bill. It proposed more restrictions, more rigorous investigations, and much harsher punishments for those in the LGBT community. The harsher punishments proposed were that those convicted of aggravated homosexuality could be sentenced to death. The bill would also enforce that anyone who discovered or knew of a gay person would have to inform the police immediately, or face jail time themselves. This was an extremely controversial bill between the Ugandan people and the rest of the world. Huge demonstrations were held within Ugandan cities to show their support for the bill, just as thousands of petitions were signed in protest. The bill was never passed as the parliamentary review committee deemed it to be feeble and unnecessary.

During these years, persecution and violence against LGBTQI identifying people's and activists continued to be prevalent, as shown by the very well-publicized case of the 2011 murder of LGBTQ activist David Kato who was murdered shortly after "winning a permanent injunction against a tabloid that published names and addresses of LGBT persons in Uganda under the headline 'Hang Them."

In February 2014, despite the rejection of the previous bill 5 years earlier, President Yoweri Museveni passed the ‘Uganda Anti-Homosexuality Act’. The act made it so that it was illegal for two people of the same sex to have sexual relations. Under this new law, anyone caught partaking in such acts would be punished by life imprisonment. This law also saw a clamp down on the LGBT community, and people were no longer allowed to fund or promote LBGT groups and/or activities. The act promoted violence and abuse towards members of the community. Suspected gay citizens were evicted from their homes by their landlords, and one Ugandan newspaper published a list of suspected homosexuals just after this law was passed in February. Ugandan civil rights activists from the Civil Society Coalition on Human Rights and Constitutional Law argued that the Anti-Homosexuality Act violates Uganda’s constitutional rights. In March 2014, the group created a petition and presented it to the Constitutional Court, and on the 1st of August 2014, the Constitutional Court of Uganda ruled the new law invalid.

Similarly to the 2009 death penalty for homosexuals’ bill, in May 2023, President Museveni passed a law stating that some same sex acts will be punishable by the death penalty. This newly signed law makes the country one of the most dangerous in the world regarding the lives of members of the LBGT community, due to the severity of the punishment. With this new law facing much backlash from all around the world, Ugandan president Yoweri Museveni defended it by insisting that a clamp down on homosexual acts is the only way to get the HIV and AIDs crisis under control.

== Bibliography ==
- Austin, David W.; Johnson, Paul E.; Wojcik, Mark E. (2010). "Sexual Orientation and Gender Identity". The International Lawyer. 46 (1): 447–462. JSTOR 40708265.
- Blevins, John (2015). "When Sodomy Leads to Martyrdom: Sex, Religion and Politics in Historical and Contemporary Contexts in Uganda and East Africa". Theology and Sexuality. 17 (1): 51–74. doi:10.1558/tse.v17i1.51.
- Burtch, Brian & Haskell, Rebecca (2014). "Learning Gender, Sexuality, and the Gay Agenda in Schools". In Walton, Gerald (ed.). The Gay Agenda: Claiming Space, Identity, and Justice. Peter Lang. pp. 239–255. ISBN 9781433118364. JSTOR 42981942.
- Cheney, Kristen (2012). "Locating Neocolonialism, 'Tradition,' and Human Rights in Uganda's 'Gay Death Penalty". African Studies Review. 55 (2): 77–95. doi:10.1353/arw.2012.0031. hdl:1765/66347. JSTOR 43904823.
- Lusimbo, Richard; Bryan, Austin (2018). Envisioning Global LGBT Human Rights: (Neo)colonialism, Neoliberalism, Resistance and Hope. London: University of London Press. ISBN 978-0-9931102-8-3. JSTOR j.ctv5132j6.
- Rao, Rahul (2015). "Re-membering Mwanga: Same-sex Intimacy, Memory and Belonging in Post-colonial Uganda". Journal of East African Studies. 9 (1): 1–19. doi:10.1080/17531055.2014.970600.
- Seo, Hyeon-Jae (2017). "Origins and Consequences of Uganda's Brutal Homophobia". Harvard International Review. 38 (3): 44–47. JSTOR 26528682.
- Strand, Cecilia; Svensson, Jakob (2023). "Challenging the Legacy of the Past and Present Intimate Colonialization–A Study of Ugandan LGBT+ Activism in Times of Shrinking Communicative Space". Information, Communication & Society. 26 (12): 2488–2505. doi:10.1080/1369118X.2023.2252505.
