= Uganda Women Parliamentary Association =

- Abbreviation: UWOPA
- Formation: 1989
- Founder: Women Members of the 5th Parliament of Uganda
- Type: Parliamentary Caucus
- Legal status: Active
- Purpose: Advancement of women's rights, gender-sensitive legislation, and affirmative action in Uganda
- Headquarters: Parliament of Uganda, Kampala
- Region served: Uganda
- Members: All women Members of Parliament; male MPs as associates or honorary members
- Website: https://www.parliament.go.ug/page/uganda-women-parliamentary-association-uwopa

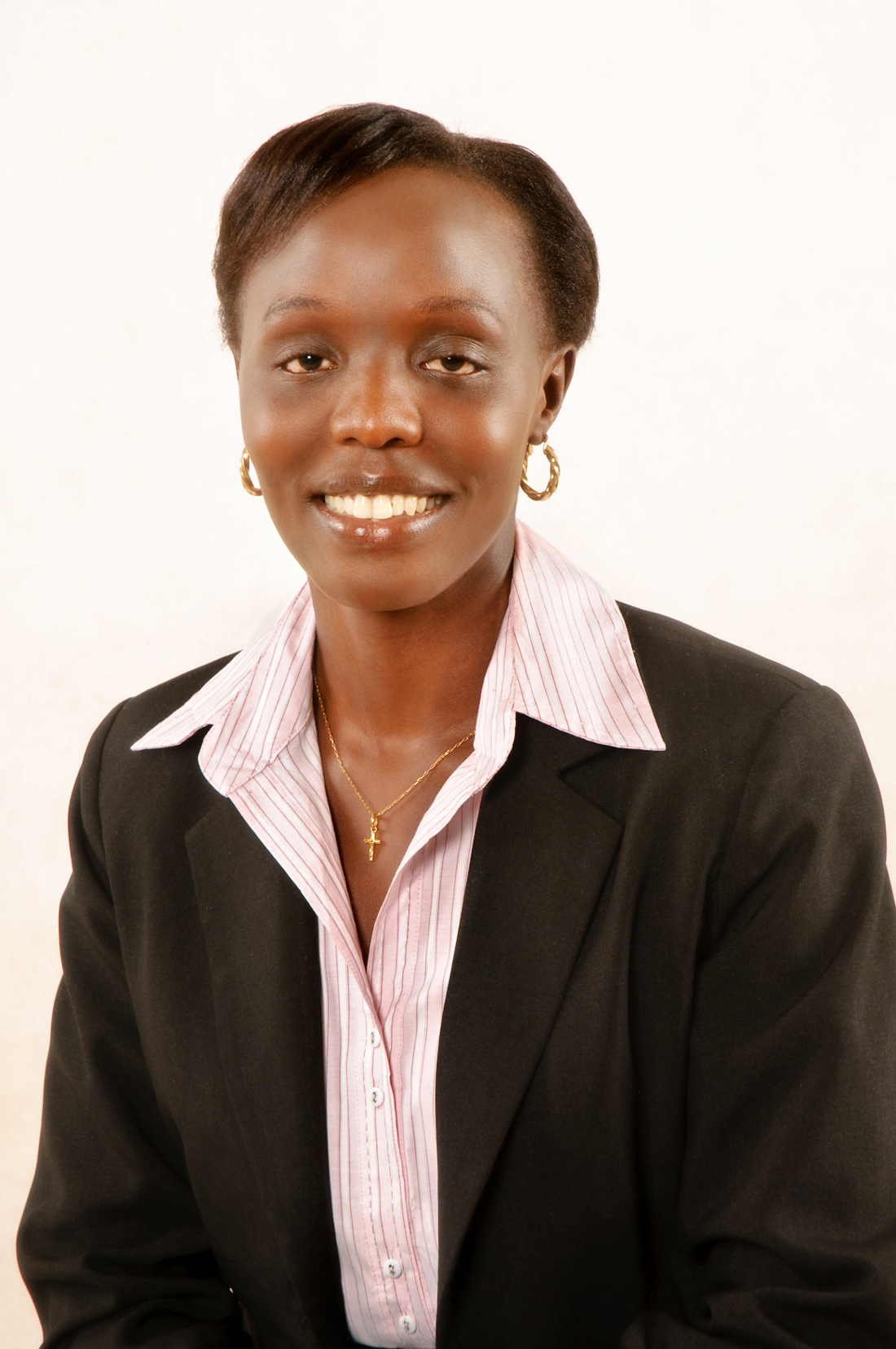
Monicah Amoding, the coordinator of UWOPA

The Uganda Women Parliamentary Association (UWOPA) is an all-party parliamentary caucus established during the 5th parliament of Uganda (1989–1994). It comprises all women MPs, though also allows male MPs to be associates or honorary members.

UWOPA helped to ensure the addition of Articles 32, 33 and 40 to the 1995 Constitution of Uganda. Article 32 stipulates affirmative action for groups discriminated against on the basis of gender, age, or disability. Article 33 articulates women's rights to equal treatment with men. Article 40 ensures women's right to maternity leave. The Association also helped to pass an amendment to the penal code, making rape subject to capital punishment, and an amendment to the 1998 Land Act granting legally married women co-ownership of land with their husbands.

UOPA has used a mix of strategies to ensure attention to women's issues in legislation and government policy. "As a result of its efforts, women are relatively well represented in parliamentary executive positions." In the 8th parliament of Uganda (2006–2011), UWOPA adopted a strategy designed to minimise opposition to progressive gender-related legislation: large pieces of legislation were broken into smaller, less controversial pieces, and male MPs were actively recruited to support and even table pro-women bills. Female MPs succeeded in establishing an equal opportunities commission (2006), and passing legislation against FGM (2009), human trafficking (2009) and domestic violence (2010).
