= Richard A. Cohen =

American advocate for conversion therapy

Richard A. Cohen is an American Evangelical Protestant Christian advocate for conversion therapy and the co-founder of "Positive Approaches to Healthy Sexuality", which was previously "Positive Alternatives to Homosexuality", a group that offers conversion therapy, which are discredited, harmful, and pseudoscientific practices purporting to change sexual orientation. In 2002, Cohen was expelled from the American Counseling Association for multiple violations.

He is author of Alfie's Home, which is a book targeted at children, which depicts homosexuality as a "condition" and conversion therapy as a "cure" to "change" sexual orientation. He gained media attention after demonstrating his touch therapy on The Daily Show, which included cuddling with men and beating a pillow.

== Biography ==
Cohen was born into a Jewish family in a suburb of Philadelphia. During adolescence, Cohen reportedly spent "years in intensive psychiatric treatment unsuccessfully trying to become straight".

Cohen was an openly gay man during his undergraduate years at Boston University, but sought counseling for his homosexuality, and later became an Evangelical Protestant Christian, and later still joined the Unification Church of the United States.

In 1980, Cohen married Jae Sook, a South Korean woman, and in 1995, Cohen and his family left the Unification Church. Cohen had affairs with men, often leaving his wife and children for long periods of time.

In 1987, Cohen claimed that he was able to "cure" his homosexuality through an "intense but platonic relationship" with a heterosexual man who "gave me the warmth of my daddy's love."

Cohen received a Bachelor of Fine Arts degree from Boston University and a Master of Arts degree in Counseling Psychology from Antioch University.

He is author of Alfie's Home, which is a book targeted at children, which depicts homosexuality as a "condition" and conversion therapy as a "cure" to "change" sexual orientation. He served as the president of "Parents and Friends of Ex-Gays and Gays", a group that promotes conversion therapy.

=== Expulsion from the American Counseling Association ===
In 2002, Cohen was expelled from the American Counseling Association (ACA) for six violations of its policies on advertising, engaging in dual relationships involving clients and counselors, and compromising client welfare. He did not appeal the ACA decision.

=== Media appearances ===
Cohen was interviewed by Jason Jones on the March 19, 2007, episode of The Daily Show. He gained media attention for demonstrating cuddling with men and hitting pillows as a method to "change" sexual orientation and "cure" homosexuality. After the appearance, the websites for "Parents and Friends of Ex-Gays and Gays" and the "National Association for Research & Therapy of Homosexuality" scrubbed mentions of Cohen.

Cohen was on Jimmy Kimmel Live! on June 28, 2006, was interviewed on The Rachel Maddow Show on December 8, 2009, and was on The Michelangelo Signorile Show on the Sirius radio network on April 17, 2010.

== Selected works ==
1. Coming Out Straight, Oakhill Press, Winchester, VA, 2000, ISBN 978-1-886939-41-7
2. Gay Children, Straight Parents, 2007, InterVarsity Press, ISBN 978-0-8308-3437-2
3. Being Gay: Nature, Nurture or Both? PATH Press, 2020, ISBN 978-1-7338469-2-9
4. Understanding Our LGBTQ+ Loved Ones, 2022, PATH Press, ISBN 978-1-7338469-8-1
5. Healing Humanity: Time, Touch & Talk, 2018, TTT Press, USA, ISBN 978-1-7338469-6-7
6. A Therapist’s Guide: Assisting Our LGBTQ+ Loved Ones, 2024, PATH Press, ISBN 979-8987026090
