= Olum Lornah Afoyomungu =

Ugandan lawyer, writer & human right activist

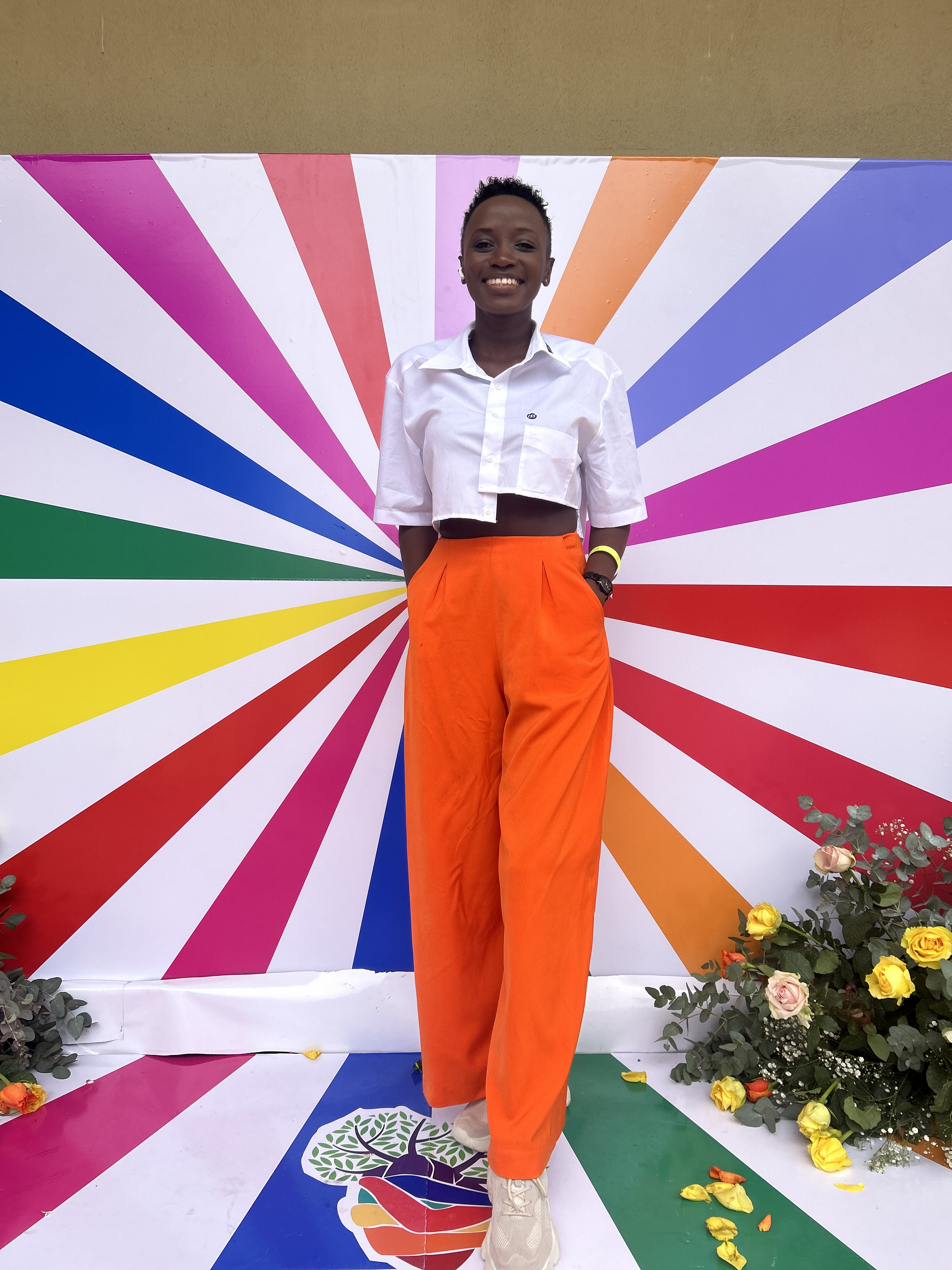
- Olum Lornah Afoyomungu
- Education: Currently PhD candidate, Centre for Human Rights, University of Pretoria
- Alma mater: Makerere University (LLB); Law Development Centre, Kampala (Postgraduate Diploma in Legal Practice); University of Pretoria (LLM in Human Rights and Democratisation in Africa)
- Occupations: Lawyer, feminist, writer, researcher
- Employer: Makerere University School of Law (Graduate Teaching Fellow)
- Known for: Human rights, gender, and international law research
- Notable work: "My Funeral"; Selected Developments in Human Rights and Democratisation in Africa (2020); Ugandan COVID‑19 Response Exacerbates Violation of Sex Workers’ Socio‑Economic Rights; The African Woman in International Law
- Website: Linkedin (Olum Lornah Afoyomungu); X (formerly Twitter)(Olum Lornah Afoyomungu

Olum Lornah Afoyomungu is a feminist Ugandan lawyer, writer and researcher on human rights, gender and international law.

== Background and education ==
She holds an LLB from Makerere University and was the best-performing law student in 2017, during which she was honoured by FIDA Uganda at the 68th graduation ceremony. She has a post graduate diploma from legal practice from Law Development Centre, Kampala Uganda. She holds a Master of Laws in human rights and democratization in Africa from the University of Pretoria. She is currently a Ph.D. candidate at the Centre for Human Rights, University of Pretoria.

== Career ==
She is currently a graduate teaching fellow at Makerere University School of Law and LLD candidate. She worked as a Programme Manager for Training and Curriculum Developer at the African Development Law Institute. Through her scholarly work, she focuses to ensuring that the voice of the African woman in international law surfaces and she also highlights the ways in which international law reproduces the marginalization of African women. She worked with CivSource Africa, which is a philanthropist organisation based in Uganda. She was furtured in the Youth Leaders for Social Change in South Africa on Youth Day.

== Publications ==
- “My Funeral” by Lornah Afoyomungu Olum
- Selected developments in human rights and democratisation in Africa during 2020
- Ugandan COVID-19 Response Exacerbates Violation of Sex Workers’ Socio-Economic Rights
- The impact of women's representation on decisions of the African Union's human rights bodies
- Ethnocentrism as an Impediment to Women’s Rights: A Case of Batwa Women in Uganda
- From Non-interference To Non-indifference: The Origin And Status Of Article 4(h) Of The Constitutive Act Of The African Union
- The African Woman In International Law
- GUIA PARA O SISTEMA AFRICANO DE DIREITOS HUMANOS
- MWONGOZO WA MFUMO WA HAKI ZA BINADAMU WA AFRIKA
- The Leaders’ Journal Pushing the boundaries of feminist thought leadership in Africa
- Building synergies between local and international philanthropy
- Who pays The Piper: A synthesis Report

== See also ==
- Sylvia Tamale
- Jacqueline Asiimwe
- Josephine Ahikire
