= Courage UK =

UK Christian ministry for the gay and lesbian community

Courage UK is a Christian ministry for the gay and lesbian community, based in Guildford, Surrey, England. It was founded as an Evangelical Christian ex-gay organisation that sought to change gay people to straight, but subsequently rejected the idea that sexual orientation could or should be changed and now exists as a pro-gay evangelical Christian ministry.

The membership of Courage UK in 2006 has been stated to be about 150 men.

== History ==
Courage UK was founded in February 1988 by Jeremy Marks. The group used to be affiliated with the ex-gay movement and was once a member of Exodus International. In 2002, the organisation abandoned those views and its affiliation with the ex-gay movement. At the time of its founding, the group's efforts were considered progressive, because it reached out to gay people rather than condemning them to hell.

=== Shift in direction ===
By 2000, Jeremy Marks and the leadership of Courage UK recognised a change was needed. The expectation of the ex-gay teaching did not equal the results they saw. Gay participants trying to become straight through the organisation became severely depressed and attempted suicide; Marks observed that only those who accepted that they were gay and found a partner were happy and successful. The teaching that gay people must get into a heterosexual relationship or remain celibate now seemed questionable to Marks. This was not only from an experiential viewpoint, but also from a theological change. In 2001, Jeremy Marks wrote in the journal Lesbian and Gay Christians, "I have come to the conclusion that we have been quite wrong to dismiss all same sex love (other than platonic) as sinful"; the group's change of position was motivated by the belief that the Bible says man should not be alone and that a loving God would not deny gay people the opportunity to love.

Marks' comments on the Courage UK website clarify the group's change of course:

A Change of Heart is the Priority
While recognising the social pressure to become 'normal' (i.e. heterosexual), fifteen years experience revealed that God's primary concern is not to change the sexual orientation of his gay and lesbian disciples, but to help them find wholeness in Christ - becoming secure, assured of his love and acceptance, set apart to follow Jesus faithfully and responsible in building relationships with one another.

As a direct result of the New Approach, Courage took a "sabbatical" from Exodus International. Courage was also forced to resign from the Evangelical Alliance.
