= Sanyu Penelope =

Ugandan lawyer and writer

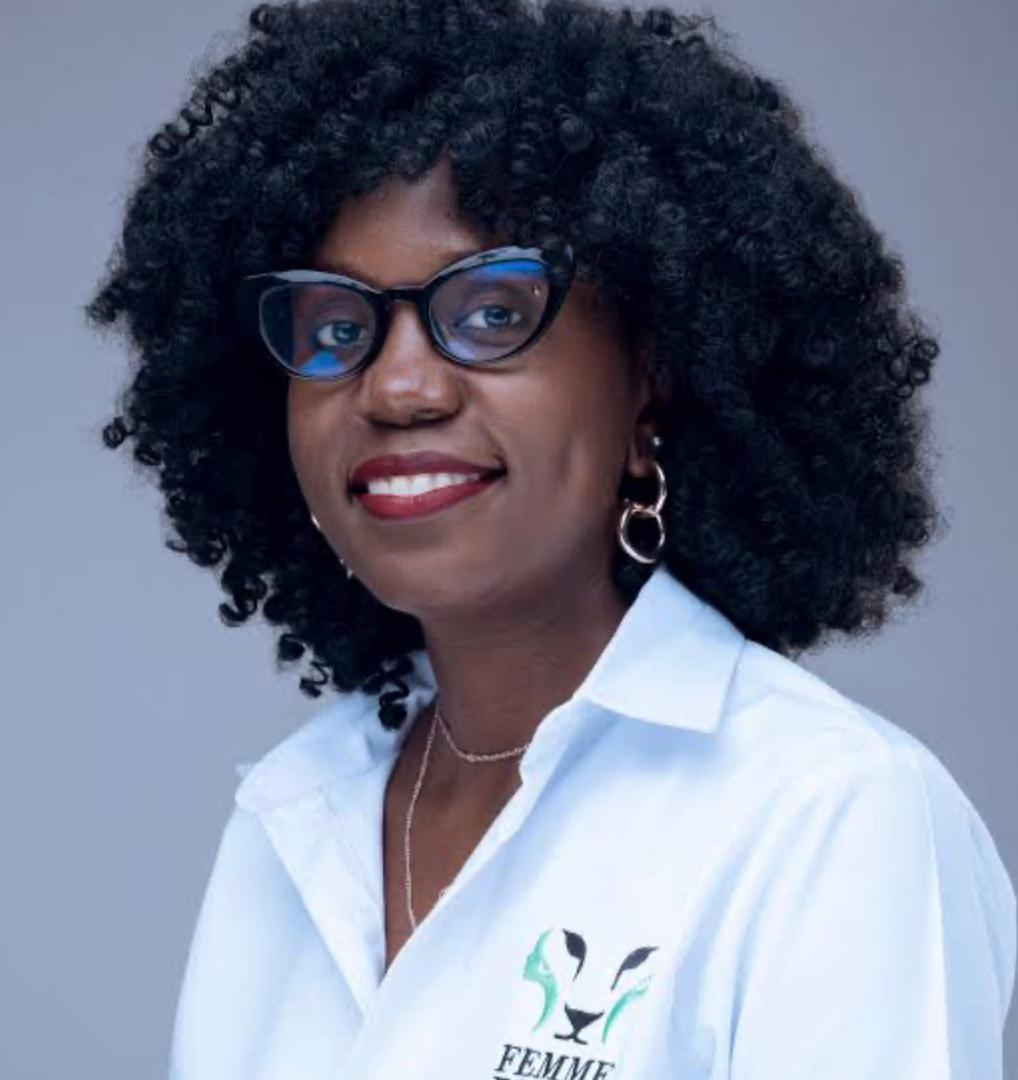
- Citizenship: Ugandan
- Education: Makerere University, University of Pretoria
- Occupations: Lawyer, Author, Feminist Leader, and Social Impact Strategist

Sanyu Penelope is a Ugandan lawyer, writer, feminist leader, social impact strategist and the founder and chief steward at Femme Forte Uganda, an organization that creates safe spaces for adolescent girls. She also founded Qweshunga initiative limited, a social enterprise that uses games and play to help youth socialize, build their confidence while strengthening connections amongst themselves.

== Early life and education ==
Penelope pursued a Bachelor's Degree in Law at Makerere University, between 2007 and 2010. She also earned a Certificate in Human Rights and Access to Medicines from the University of Pretoria. Furthermore, she holds a Postgraduate Diploma in Sexual & Reproductive Health and Rights (SRHR) from The Ahaki Institute, in Kampala.

== Career ==
Penelope held roles at Uhuru Institute, the International HIV/AIDs Alliance and Uganda Youth Network, and while there, she was in-charge of youth centered projects.

In 2017, she founded Femme Forte Uganda, a feminist movement-building entity and social enterprise that advances women's economic, social and political power. Under her stewardship, Femme Forte Uganda launched a virtual museum in 2025, to celebrate the lives and legacies of feminists in Africa. The museum is a digital platform and a tribute to sheroes who paved way for gender justice and a more equitable society.

Furthermore, she advocates for the sexual reproductive health and rights of women and girls by emphasizing the need to provide them with access to contraception, comprehensive sex education with open discussions around sex, pregnancies and abortions. Her organization was one of the nine national partners that participated in the "Stand up for SRHR" project. The project was funded by Global Affairs and implemented by Oxfam Canada in Uganda, Mozambique and Canada. The team at Femme Forte Uganda, stewarded by Penelope worked with vulnerable and adolescent girls from diverse backgrounds to raise awareness with a demand f quality rights-based sexual and reproductive health.

Penelope is also a certified financial growth coach who mentors young women. She worked with the Uganda Women's movement and civil society to advocate for the inclusion of women in critical decision-making processes.

In 2020, Penelope started a social arts movement and YouTube Channel that uses play as a medium of healing, innovation and life reflection.

Penelope is one of the contributors the journals, Feminist Africa, an academic publication hosted at the Institute of Public Studies aimed at sharing stories of African Feminist communities.

Further still, Penelope has participated in a number of campaigns in Uganda such as Black Monday, Anti-Corruption Movement, Ride for Jobs Campaign, Petition 16 on Maternal Health Rights, Women's March Uganda and #EndFemicide Advocacy.
