= Monicah Amoding =

Ugandan lawyer, social worker and politician (born 1981)

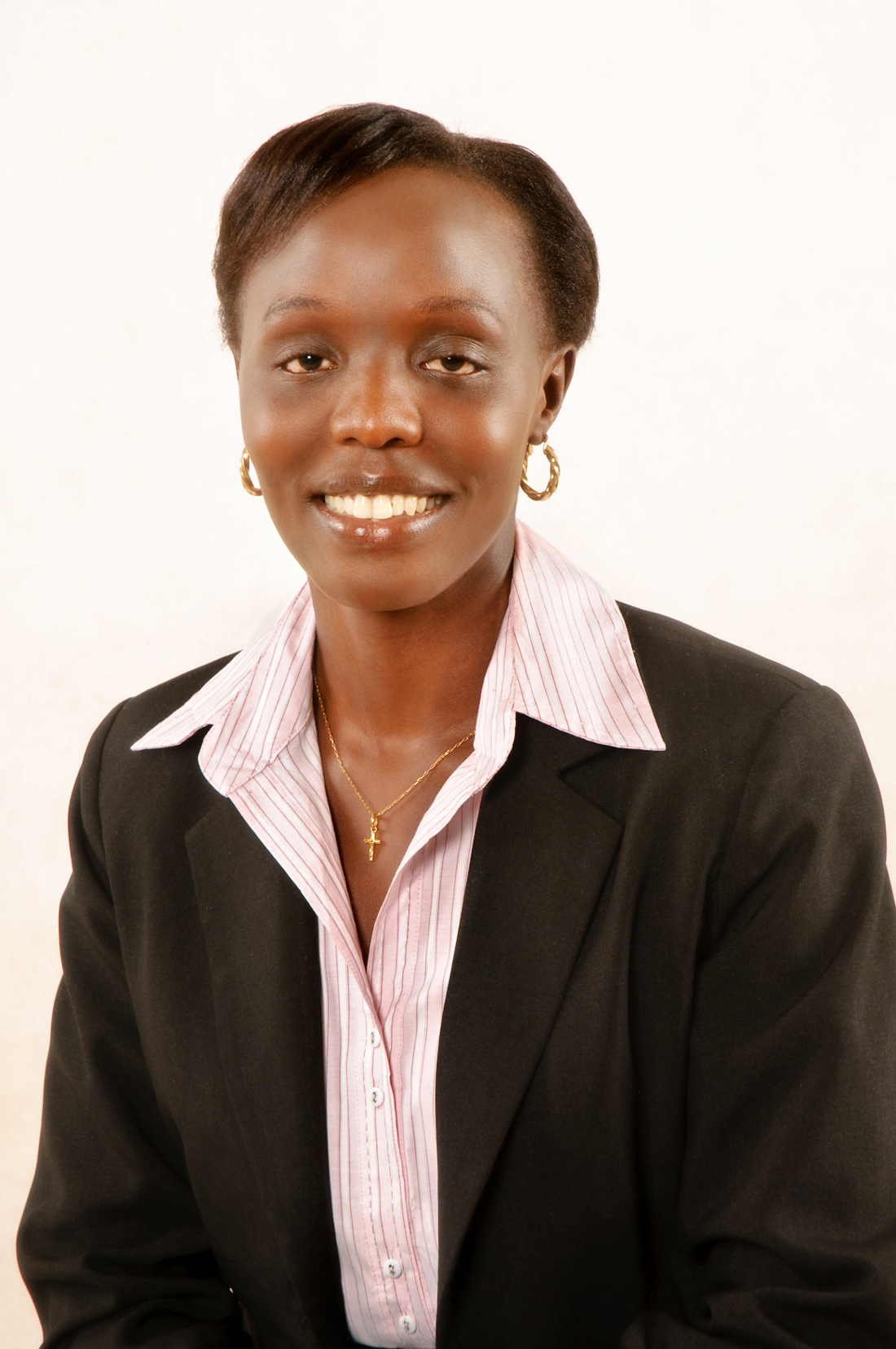
- 30-Nov-1981
- Born: 30 November 1981 (age 44); Uganda
- Citizenship: Uganda
- Education: Makerere University (Bachelor of Arts in Social Sciences) (Bachelor of Laws) (Master of Gender Studies); Uongozi Leadership Institute, Dar es Salam (Certificate in Leadership); African Women Leadership Institute, Accra (Certificate in Feminist Leadership)
- Occupations: Lawyer, Social worker and politician

Monicah Amoding (born 30 November 1981) is a Ugandan politician, lawyer and social worker, who served as the district woman representative of Kumi District, in the 10th Ugandan Parliament, (2016–2021), as a member of the ruling National Resistance Movement political party.

== Background and education ==
Amoding was born in November 1981. She attended Namilyango Girls Primary School in Mukono District, graduating with a Primary Leaving Examination Certificate from there in 1993. She went on to obtain her O-Level education from Tororo Girls School, graduating with a Uganda Certificate of Education, in 1997. Two years later, she received a Uganda Advanced Certificate of Education from Makerere High School, having completed her A-Level education.

She holds three academic degrees. Her first degree is a Bachelor of Arts in Social Sciences, awarded by Makerere University in 2004. Her second degree is a Master of Gender Studies also awarded by Makerere University in 2013. Her third degree is a Bachelor of Laws obtained from Makerere in 2018.

Amoding also holds two certificates, one a Certificate in Leadership, awarded by Uongozi Leadership Institute, Dar es Salam. The other is a Certificate in Feminist Leadership, obtained from African Women Leadership Institute, Accra.

== Career ==
=== Before politics ===
From 2006 until 2011, Amoding worked in various roles outside of the political arena. She was the Media and Communications Officer for CEDOVIP, a non-government organisation, from 2006 until 2007. She then went to work for the Uganda Women Parliamentary Association (UWPA), first as a Policy and Communications Officer from 2008 until 2009; and then as a Programme Coordinator, from 2009 until 2010.

=== Political career ===
In 2011, Amoding became a member of Uganda's unicameral parliament, representing the "Youth". In 2016, she was elected as the woman representative for Kumi District.

In 2015, she introduced what became known as the "Sexual Offences Bill 2019". After winding through parliamentary committees, the bill passed parliament in May 2021, although supporters and opponents of the legislation were unhappy with what was passed, on account of what was included and what was left out. In the end, the bill might not become law if the president declines to sign it. Three reasons why he might not (a) The United States, a major benefactor of the Ugandan government is opposed to some provisions of the bill (b) The bill attempts to achieve too much, thus antagonizing too many would-be supporters and (c) There is no political dividend. The 2021 elections are over. The next elections are not until 2026.

== Other considerations ==
During the national elections in 2021, Monicah Amoding lost her parliamentary seat to Christine Apolot who received 35,152 votes against Amoding's 29,292 votes.

== Personal life ==
Amoding is married. Her hobbies are writing, reading, travelling and meditation. She has special interest in advocating for rights of marginalized groups, volunteering in humanitarian activities and working with local and poor communities. She also serves as a leader for women at https://eogm.org/about/

== See also ==
- List of members of the tenth Parliament of Uganda
- List of members of the ninth Parliament of Uganda
- https://www.vitalvoices.org/fellow/monicah-amoding/
- Jacqueline Amongin
