= Steven Kabuye =

- Born: Uganda
- Occupation: LGBTQ rights activist
- Years active: 2021–present
- Organization: Coloured Voices Media Foundation (CVMF)
- Known for: Advocacy for LGBTQ rights in Uganda
- Notable work: LGBTQ advocacy, public education, and media campaigns in Uganda
- Title: Executive Director, Coloured Voices Media Foundation
- Movement: LGBTQ rights movement

Steven Kabuye is a Ugandan LGBTQ rights activist.

He is the executive director of Coloured Voices Media Foundation (CVMF), an organization that advocates for LGBTQ rights and public education in Uganda.

== Activism ==
In 2021, Kabuye co-founded Coloured Voices Media Foundation to combat misinformation about LGBTQ people in Uganda through media, education, and community outreach. The organization became involved in advocacy and support work for LGBTQ Ugandans, including public education initiatives and community events. Following the passage of Uganda's Anti-Homosexuality Act in 2023, Kabuye emerged as a prominent critic of the legislation. He used social media platforms and interviews with international media outlets to discuss the impact of the law on LGBTQ Ugandans and to advocate for greater protections for sexual and gender minorities.

== 2024 Attack ==
On 3 January 2024, Kabuye was attacked by assailants while travelling to work in Kampala. He sustained stab wounds to his arm and abdomen and was hospitalized. Video footage recorded shortly after the attack circulated widely on social media and received international media coverage. Human rights organizations and LGBTQ advocacy groups condemned the attack and linked it to a broader climate of hostility toward LGBTQ people in Uganda. Ugandan authorities opened an investigation into the incident. After the attack, HE left Uganda and later resettled in Toronto, Canada, with assistance from Rainbow Railroad, a nonprofit organization that supports LGBTQ individuals facing persecution and violence.

== See also ==
- Frank Mugisha
- Sexual Minorities Uganda
- LGBTQ rights in Uganda
- Uganda Anti-Homosexuality Act 2014
- Rainbow Railroad
- LGBT rights in Uganda
