= Val Kalende =

Ugandan activist for LGBT rights

- Born: Uganda
- Education: Makerere University
- Occupation: LGBT rights activist
- Years active: 2003–present
- Organizations: Freedom & Roam Uganda
- Known for: LGBT activism in Uganda; co-founding Freedom & Roam Uganda
- Notable work: Advocacy on LGBT rights in Uganda
- Movement: LGBT rights movement

Val Kalende is an LGBT activist from Uganda. After coming out as a lesbian in 2003, she became involved in Ugandan LGBT activism. In 2018, she stated she was no longer a lesbian, having been "transformed by God's love" (TBGL). Later, she retracted these statements and said that she was a lesbian.

== Biography ==
In 2003, Kalende came out as a lesbian, which led her Christian family to break ties with her. As a student at Makerere University in Kampala, she co-founded the country's first lesbian activist organization, Freedom & Roam Uganda. Weeks after the introduction of the Anti-Homosexuality Act, 2014, which made homosexuality punishable by life imprisonment, Kalende accepted to be interviewed about her sexuality in a cover story for the national newsmagazine the Daily Monitor. In 2012, after being active for 10 years in Uganda, in a Huffington Post blog post, she revealed how "coming out" as a lesbian caused her to be a victim of verbal abuse, alienation, abandonment as a teenager and homelessness at a tender age.

A fellow at the International Gay and Lesbian Human Rights Commission, she researched the way of organizing and the strategy put into practice by each African LGBT movement, and how international NGOs can support their work. She further expressed herself for a balanced narrative that would bring the change needed, not only a victimization narrative, but also starting to focus on positive stories of assertiveness (such as the pressing activity of Victor Mukasa, the founder of Sexual Minorities Uganda (SMUG), at US consular offices), a statement that has not been well received even among fellow activists. Considering that despite the international attention and making leaders accountable, that pits the community against its countrymen. She also hoped to strengthen collaboration between activists and civil society on a wide range of human rights issues.

In August 2018, on the local Christian channel Salt TV, Kalende issued a public statement that she was no longer a lesbian.

Dear LGBT movement: I found Life, Truth and Grace. My prayer is that you find the good life as I have. Y'all have become my reason for intercession. I know, from some of the messages I've received so far, that the Holy Spirit has begun speaking to your hearts. He is the revealer of all truth… To pastors I disagreed with, I am sorry. To politicians I violently fought in a war of words, I am sorry. To the old and young generation of this nation, I am sorry. To my FATHER and maker, I am sorry. To myself, I am sorry. I am at peace with my soul because I am forgiven and forever set free. Psalm 51:17.

In 2022, Kalende retracted her previous statement and said that she left the "ex-gay" cult, and that someone's sexuality cannot be changed. She issued an apology to those who were hurt by her statements, particularly the LGBTQ Ugandan community.
