= David Kato =

Ugandan LGBT rights activist (1964–2011)

- Born: c. 1964; Nakawala, Mukono, Uganda
- Died: 26 January 2011 (aged 46–47); Bukusa, Mukono, Uganda
- Cause of death: Murder
- Known for: LGBT rights activist

David Kato Kisule (c. 1964 – 26 January 2011) was a Ugandan teacher and LGBT rights activist, considered a father of Uganda's gay rights movement and described as "Uganda's first openly gay man". He served as advocacy officer for Sexual Minorities Uganda (SMUG).

Kato was murdered at his home on 26 January 2011, shortly after winning a lawsuit against Rolling Stone, a Ugandan magazine which had published his name and photograph identifying him as gay and calling for him to be executed.

== Early life ==
Born to the Kisule clan in its ancestral village of Nakawala, Namataba Town Council, Mukono District, he received the name "Kato" because he was the younger of twins. He was educated at King's College Budo and Kyambogo University and taught at various schools including the Nile Vocational Institute in Njeru near Jinja. It was here that he became aware of his sexual orientation and was subsequently dismissed without any benefits in 1991. Later, he came out to his twin brother John Malumba Wasswa.

He left to teach for a few years in Johannesburg, South Africa during its transition from apartheid to multiracial democracy. He became influenced by the end of the apartheid-era ban on sodomy and the growth of LGBT rights in South Africa. Coming back to Uganda in 1998, he decided to come out in public through a press conference; he was arrested and held in police custody for a week due to this action. He continued to maintain contact with pro-LGBT activists outside the country, with LGEP executive director Phumzile S. Mtetwa later citing an encounter with Kato at the 1999 ILGA World Conference.

When St Herman Nkoni Boys Primary School was founded in 2002 in the Roman Catholic Diocese of Masaka (Masaka District), Kato joined the faculty.

== Involvement with SMUG ==
Kato became highly involved with the underground LGBT rights movement in Uganda, eventually becoming one of the founding members of SMUG on 3 March 2004.

According to a series of confidential cables written by a Kampala-based United States diplomat and later released by WikiLeaks, Kato spoke during a November 2009 United Nations-funded consultative conference on human rights. During the conference, Kato spoke on the issue of LGBT rights and the anti-LGBT atmosphere in Uganda. Members of the Uganda Human Rights Commission "openly joked and snickered" during the speech.

A rumour circulated that David Bahati MP, the leading proponent of the Uganda Anti-Homosexuality Bill, had ordered the Inspector General of Police to arrest Kato, causing Kato and other attending members of SMUG to leave the conference immediately after he finished the speech. Bahati then made a "tirade against homosexuality" to the conference, resulting in massive applause and Martin Ssempa, an evangelical Christian cleric, pounding his fist on the table in agreement.

By 2010, Kato had quit his job as a school teacher to focus on his work with SMUG in light of the events surrounding the Uganda Anti-Homosexuality Bill. Kato was subsequently given a one year fellowship at the Centre for Applied Human Rights based at the University of York in the United Kingdom, a centre which provides fellowships to vulnerable and threatened human rights activists as a reprieve from the dangers they face in their own countries.

== Rolling Stone case ==
Kato was among the 100 people whose names and photographs were published in October 2010 by the Ugandan tabloid newspaper Rolling Stone in an article which called for their execution as homosexuals. Kato and two other SMUG members who were also listed in the article – Kasha Nabagesera and Pepe Julian Onziema – sued the newspaper to force it to stop publishing the names and pictures of people it believed to be gay or lesbian. The photos were published under a headline of "Hang them" and were accompanied by the individuals' addresses.

The petition was granted on 2 November 2010, effectively ruling for the cessation of publication of Rolling Stone. Giles Muhame, the paper's managing editor, commented: "I haven't seen the court injunction but the war against gays will and must continue. We have to protect our children from this dirty homosexual affront." On 3 January 2011, High Court Justice V. F. Kibuuka Musoke ruled that Rolling Stone's publication of the lists, and the accompanying incitation to violence, threatened Kato's and the others' "fundamental rights and freedoms;" attacked their right to human dignity; and violated their constitutional right to privacy. The court ordered the newspaper to pay Kato and the other two plaintiffs USh 1.5 million each (approx. US$600 as of May 2012).

== Murder ==
On 26 January 2011, at around 2:00 PM EAT (11:00 UTC), after talking on the phone with SMUG member Julian Pepe Onziema a few hours before, Kato was assaulted in his home in Bukusa, Mukono Town, by a man who hit him twice in the head with a hammer. The man then fled on foot. Kato later died en route to the Kawolo General Hospital. Kato's colleagues note that Kato had spoken of an increase in threats and harassment since the court victory, and they believe that his sexual orientation and his activism were the motive for the murder.

Joe Oloka-Onyango, who worked with Kato on the court case, said, "This is a very strange thing to happen in the middle of the day, and suggests pre-meditation." According to reports in The New York Times and the Sydney Morning Herald, questions have been raised about the murder being linked to Kato's sexuality. Human Rights Watch and Amnesty International have both called for an in-depth and impartial investigation into the case, and for protection for gay activists. James Nsaba Buturo, the Ugandan Minister of State for Ethics and Integrity, is on record as having declared that "Homosexuals can forget about human rights".

=== Arrests ===
A police spokesperson initially blamed the murder on robbers who had allegedly killed at least 10 people in the area over the previous two months. Police arrested one suspect, Kato's driver, and were seeking a second. On 2 February 2011, police announced the arrest of Nsubuga Enoch, saying that he had confessed to the murder. A police spokesperson described Enoch as a "well-known thief" and local gardener, but stated as to Enoch's alleged motive, "It wasn't a robbery and it wasn't because Kato was an activist. It was a personal disagreement but I can't say more than that."

A police source alleged to the Uganda Monitor that Enoch had murdered Kato because Kato would not pay him for sexual favours, an allegation that was repeated by the Ugandan ambassador to Belgium in a letter to European Parliament President Jerzy Buzek. The Ugandan Ambassador later reiterated this version of events in a letter to the European Parliament, stating that Kato had earlier paid for "his prostitute" to be released from prison, but had then been attacked by him for refusing to pay for sex.

=== Conviction ===
After being spotted by Nakabago residents in Mukono district, Sidney Nsubuga Enoch was arrested, and prosecuted at Mukono High Court by the lead State Prosecutor, Loe Karungi. He was sentenced to 30 years with hard labour, by Justice Joseph Mulangira, on Thursday 10 November 2011. The apparent motive was robbery.

=== Funeral ===
Kato's funeral was held on 28 January 2011, in Nakawala. Present at the funeral were family, friends and co-activists, many of whom wore t-shirts bearing his photo in front, the Portuguese "la [sic] luta continua" in the back and having rainbow flag colours inscribed onto the sleeves. The Christian preacher at the funeral – Anglican pastor Thomas Musoke – preached against the gays and lesbians present, making comparisons to Sodom and Gomorrah, before the activists ran to the pulpit and grabbed the microphone from him, forcing him to retreat from the pulpit to Kato's father's house.

An unidentified female activist angrily exclaimed "Who are you to judge others?" and villagers sided with the preacher as scuffles broke out during the proceedings. Villagers refused to bury Kato at his burial place. The task was then undertaken by his friends and co-workers. In place of the preacher who left the scene after the fighting, excommunicated Church of Uganda bishop Christopher Senyonjo officiated at Kato's burial in the presence of friends and cameras.

=== Reactions and tributes ===
The murder was decried by Human Rights Watch, with senior Africa researcher Maria Burnett adding that "David Kato's death is a tragic loss to the human rights community." Amnesty International stated that it was "appalled by the shocking murder of David Kato," and called for a "credible and impartial investigation into his murder." Both also asked the Ugandan government to protect other gay rights activists.

US President Barack Obama, US Secretary of State Hillary Clinton and the State Department, and the European Union also condemned the murder and urged Uganda authorities to investigate the crime and to speak out against homophobia and transphobia. "I am deeply saddened to learn of the murder," Obama said. "David showed tremendous courage in speaking out against hate. He was a powerful advocate for fairness and freedom."

Rowan Williams, the Anglican Archbishop of Canterbury, spoke on behalf of the Anglican Communion, "Such violence [as the death of David Kato] has been consistently condemned by the Anglican Communion worldwide. This event also makes it all the more urgent for the British Government to secure the safety of LGBT asylum seekers in the UK. This is a moment to take very serious stock and to address those attitudes of mind which endanger the lives of men and women belonging to sexual minorities."

For his newspaper's alleged role in the murder, Rolling Stone editor Giles Muhame stated "When we called for hanging of gay people, we meant ... after they have gone through the legal process ... I did not call for them to be killed in cold blood like he was." However, he stated, "I have no regrets about the story. We were just exposing people who were doing wrong."

In Spring 2011, Boston's American Repertory Theater and System of a Down's Serj Tankian dedicated their production of Prometheus Bound to Kato and seven other activists, stating in program notes that "by singing the story of Prometheus, the God who defied the tyrant Zeus by giving the human race both fire and art, this production hopes to give a voice to those currently being silenced or endangered by modern-day oppressors".

The Gay Pride event in York, United Kingdom, held on 30 July 2011 commemorated Kato. A minute of silence was observed and hundreds of rainbow coloured balloons were released in his memory by Member of Parliament for York Central Hugh Bayley and the Lord Mayor of York.

The David Kato Vision & Voice Award was established in his memory. The 2012 recipient, Jamaican LGBTQ rights activist Maurice Tomlinson, was announced on 14 December 2011 and was awarded on 29 January 2012 in London. Participant organisations include Global Forum on MSM & HIV (MSMGF), Sexual Minorities Uganda (SMUG), International Planned Parenthood Federation (IPPF), GIZ – Deutsche Gesellschaft für Internationale Zusammenarbeit, Herbert Smith LLP, and ILGA-Europe.

In 2014, Kato was inducted into the Legacy Walk, an outdoor public display in Chicago, Illinois which celebrates LGBTQ history and people.

German-Dutch author Lutz van Dijk was inspired by Kato's activism and killing to write Kampala – Hamburg: Roman einer Flucht.

On 16 June 2021, the University of York announced that Kato would be the namesake of the new David Kato College, the first college on York's campus to be named after a person of African descent.

== Documentary films ==
Kato was interviewed by US filmmakers Katherine Fairfax Wright and Malika Zouhali-Worrall for a documentary film on his life, Call Me Kuchu, which premiered at the Berlin International Film Festival on 11 February 2012. A short film using footage from the film, They Will Say We Are Not Here, was posted to the New York Times website on the first anniversary of his death.

Kato met Roger Ross Williams shortly before his death and was an inspiration in the making of God Loves Uganda (2013), a documentary exploring connections between Christian evangelism in North America and in Uganda.

== See also ==
- Abiding Truth Ministries
- LGBT rights in Uganda
