= God Loves Uganda =

2013 American documentary

- Directed by: Roger Ross Williams
- Produced by: Roger Ross Williams; Julie Goldman
- Starring: Lou Engle; Jonathan Hall; Rev. Kapya Kaoma; Rev. Robert Kayanja; Rev. Jo Anna Watson; Jesse & Rachelle Digges; Bishop Christopher Senyonjo; Rev. Martin Ssempa; Scott Lively
- Cinematography: Derek Wiesehahn
- Edited by: Richard Hankin (supervising editor); Benjamin Gray
- Music by: Mark degli Antoni
- Distributed by: Variance Films
- Release date: January 18, 2013
- Running time: 83 minutes
- Country: United States
- Language: English

God Loves Uganda is a 2013 American documentary film produced and directed by Roger Ross Williams, which premiered at the 2013 Sundance Film Festival. It explores connections between evangelicalism in North America and in Uganda, suggesting that the North American influence is the reason behind the controversial Uganda Anti-Homosexuality Act, which at one point raised the possibility of the death penalty for gays and lesbians. The filmmakers follow a group of young missionaries from the International House of Prayer in their first missionary effort in another nation, as well as interviewing several evangelical leaders from the US and Uganda.

Williams was inspired to make God Loves Uganda when he met David Kato, an LGBT activist who was killed in 2011, ostensibly in a robbery. Kato told there was an untold story of the damage American fundamentalist evangelicals are doing in Uganda; of the insidious nature of their aggressive effort to harvest young, unclaimed souls to preach a gospel of love intertwined with a gospel of intolerance.

The Dutch premiere of the film was at the Movies that Matter Film Festival in The Netherlands in 2014.

== Reception ==
In late May 2014, the film aired on several PBS stations in the United States as part of the Independent Lens series. In response, the International House of Prayer issued a God Loves Uganda FAQ on their website which responds to a number of the issues raised in the documentary. Website Right Wing Watch subsequently criticized this response.

=== Critical reception ===
Joe Mirabella at The Huffington Post described it as the "most terrifying film of the year"; Tim Wu at Slate and Bill Blezek at the Omaha World-Herald described the film as "disturbing". On the other hand, John G. Stackhouse Jr. of Christianity Today criticized the film for "evangelophobia" and trading in "propaganda", likening the film to the 2006 film Jesus Camp. On review aggregator website Rotten Tomatoes, the film holds an approval rating of 100% based on 29 reviews, and an average rating of 7.67/10.

=== Awards ===
God Loves Uganda has won the following awards:

- Full Frame Inspiration Award at the Full Frame Documentary Film Festival
- Grand Jury Prize for Best Documentary at the 2013 Dallas International Film Festival
- Best Feature Length Documentary at the Ashland Independent Film Festival
- Audience Award Documentary at the Mountain Film Festival
- Best Overall Documentary at the DocuWest Film Festival
- Sheffield Youth Jury Award at the Sheffield Doc/Fest
- Grand Jury Pink Peach Feature at the Atlanta Film Festival
- Jury Award for Documentary Feature at the Tampa International Gay and Lesbian Film Festival

== See also ==
- Call Me Kuchu
