= Frank Mugisha =

Ugandan LGBTQ rights activist (born 1979)

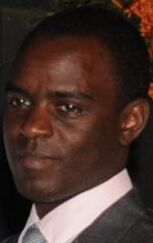
- Born: June 17, 1979 (age 47); Kampala, Uganda
- Citizenship: Ugandan
- Occupation: LGBT rights activist
- Organization: Sexual Minorities Uganda (SMUG)
- Known for: Advocacy for LGBT rights in Uganda
- Title: Executive Director
- Awards: Robert F. Kennedy Human Rights Award (2011); Thorolf Rafto Memorial Prize (2011)

Frank Mugisha (born 17 June 1979) is a Ugandan LGBT advocate and Executive Director of Sexual Minorities Uganda (SMUG), who has won the Robert F. Kennedy Human Rights Award and Thorolf Rafto Memorial Prize 2011 for his activism. Mugisha is one of the most prominent advocates for LGBT rights in Uganda.

== Biography ==
Mugisha was born in a suburb of Kampala, Uganda. Raised in a strict Catholic family, he came out to his brother at age 14. Although his coming out estranged him from some family members, other friends and family have continued to support him.

While still at university in 2004, he founded Icebreakers Uganda, an organization created as a support network for LGBT Ugandans who are out or in the process of coming out to family and friends. Mugisha is now the executive director of SMUG, an umbrella organization that consists of eighteen groups, including Icebreakers Uganda.

Mugisha has been honored by the UN - Secretary General. Listed in the Advocate Magazine, The Independent, honored by Black Entertainment Television - BET and Mugisha was named by #POWER10: among most Influential Black LGBTQ people in 2014.

Mugisha was close friends with fellow advocate and SMUG founder David Kato, who was murdered in January 2011 after successfully suing a tabloid named Rolling Stone for publishing the names of 100 LGBT Ugandans with an encouragement to "hang them". Mugisha is one of the plaintiffs from SMUG represented by the Center for Constitutional Rights using the Alien Tort Statute to sue American evangelist Scott Lively for crimes against humanity for his work on the Uganda's Anti-Homosexuality Bill, work described as inciting the persecution of gay men and lesbians and as "conduct ... actively trying to harm and deprive other people of their rights [which] is the definition of persecution". In August 2013, Federal U.S. District Court Judge Michael A. Ponsor ruled that the plaintiffs were on solid ground under international and federal law in rejecting a jurisdictional challenge to the suit; he also ruled that First Amendment defenses for Lively's conduct were premature.

Writing in The Guardian in 2014, Mugisha argued that homophobia and the hatred behind the Anti-Homosexuality Bill were from western influences: "I am a gay man. I am also Ugandan. There is nothing un-African about me. Uganda is where I was born, grew up and call my home. It is also a country in which I have become little more than an unapprehended criminal because of whom I love. I want my fellow Ugandans to understand that homosexuality is not a western import and our friends in the developed world to recognise that the current trend of homophobia is."

== Recognition ==
Mugisha was awarded the 2011 Robert F. Kennedy Human Rights Award and the 2011 Rafto Prize for his work pursuing LGBT rights in Uganda. He also received an honorary doctorate of the University of Ghent. Mugisha was a 2014 nominee for the Nobel Peace Prize. In 2017, Mugisha was included in Fortune Magazine's list of world's greatest leaders.

== See also ==
- Stella Nyanzi
- Pepe Julian Onziema
