= Call Me Kuchu =

2012 American documentary film directed by Malika Zouhali-Worrall

- Theatrical release poster
- Directed by: Malika Zouhali-Worrall; Katherine Fairfax Wright
- Distributed by: Cinedigm
- Release dates: February 12, 2012 (Berlin International Film Festival); June 14, 2013 (United States)
- Running time: 87 minutes
- Country: United States
- Box office: $3,476

Call Me Kuchu is a 2012 American documentary film directed by Malika Zouhali-Worrall and Katherine Fairfax Wright. The film explores the struggles of the LGBT community in Uganda, focusing in part on the 2011 murder of LGBT activist David Kato.

The film jointly received the 2014 GLAAD Media Award for Outstanding Documentary alongside Bridegroom.

== Title ==
At the beginning of the film, it is explained that "Kuchu", a word of Swahili origin, is a way to refer to homosexuals in Uganda; Sylvia Tamale documented the usage of the word by homosexual Ugandans as a catch-all self-description.

== Summary ==
In Kampala, two men are having a ninth anniversary party together with friends. However, it is a very quiet event and everyone is dressing casually to avoid attracting attention. Meanwhile, we see footage of pastors and politicians describing homosexuality as a Western and sinful activity.

Outside his home, David Kato (1964–2011) recounts how he found out about "gay life" when he was living in South Africa ten years earlier. He picked up a gay escort and had sex for the first time, at the age of 28. He then decided to return to his home country of Uganda and spread gay rights there. At the headquarters of Sexual Minorities Uganda, the LGBT non-profit organization he runs, he explains he is the first openly gay man in Uganda. He adds his job is to track all instances of homophobia in Uganda. Next a man from Mbale explains he was arrested and humiliated by police officers. Then Naome Ruzindana, a lesbian activist with two children, is introduced. In 2004, she founded the Coalition of African Lesbians.

Gilles Muhame, managing editor of the weekly Ugandan tabloid Rolling Stone, talks about his decision to publish pictures of homosexuals with a quotation from a pastor: "Hang them!" He adds he would like to raid their homes and take their pictures in their own bedrooms, and thus "ignore the right of privacy in the interest of the public." Meanwhile, Naome reveals she became a target for homophobia after her picture was published in the newspaper. Later, David sees a copy of Rolling Stone falsely accusing homosexuals of aiding and abetting terrorist organizations such as the Lord’s Resistance Army, Allied Democratic Forces and Al-Shabaab during the July 2010 Kampala attacks. David then talks to his lawyer, who advises him not to sue over every homophobic article published. Next Long Jones discusses another article in Rolling Stone, suggesting they have a list of 100 homosexuals who are spreading AIDS in Uganda. At a trial over the articles, Gilles Muhame does not present a defense and the ruling is adjourned; Pastor Solomon Male is present.

A friend of Naome and fellow activist Stosh then recounts being raped by a man who wanted to turn her straight by doing so. He gave her AIDS and her family did not believe it was unconsensual. When she got pregnant five months later, she had an abortion. Next introduced is Bishop Christopher Senyonjo, who says Paul the Apostle does not discriminate against homosexuals in Galatians 3:28, and wants to build a safe center for them.

Meanwhile, we learn that politician David Bahati has proposed the Uganda Anti-Homosexuality Bill, widely condemned by the international community. However, residents of Jinja, Uganda protest in favour of the bill, organized by Pastor Martin Ssempa, falsely accusing homosexuals of "raping children". We then hear from Dr Sylvia Tamale who explains that in March 2009, the Family Life Network invited evangelical leaders from the United States to warn Ugandans about an alleged homosexual threat from overseas. Similarly, another pastor called HM Nyanzi says homosexuality is against the word of God because it is against reproduction. Meanwhile, Rolling Stone published part two of pictures and Gilles boasts about it as an accomplishment. David appeals to the local bureau of the Office of the United Nations High Commissioner for Human Rights. Bishop Senyonjo claims that he is dismissed from the Church of Uganda for his support of homosexuals, though the church claims that it was because of his participation in the consecration of a man to be a bishop of a church with which the Church of Uganda is not in communion. In another twist, there is a second trial, and the judge rules that the newspaper is not allowed to publish pictures, names and addresses of homosexuals. David and his friends have a party–a fashion show where they crossdress to celebrate their victory.

David is murdered in a devastating homophobic attack. Anti-gay protesters disrupt the funeral. Still, his friends have a party in his honour after the funeral. In New York City, LGBT activists honour his death too, condemning pastors Lou Engle and Scott Lively for allegedly promoting homophobia in Uganda. Meanwhile, Gilles of Rolling Stone is unrepentant and does not take the blame for his death. David's friends fear the worst for their lives. Still, due to international pressure, the anti-gay law is not passed.

== Critical reception ==
The film premiered at the 2012 Berlin International Film Festival, and won the Teddy Award for Best Documentary.

At the 2012 Hot Docs Canadian International Documentary Festival, it won the award for Best International Feature Documentary.

== Distribution ==
Distribution rights for the film were acquired by Cinedigm Entertainment Group in October 2012, with plans for a theatrical release in early 2013, followed by on-demand, premium digital, DVD and V releases.
