= Christopher Senyonjo =

Ugandan Anglican bishop (1931–2026)

The Right Reverend Christopher Senyonjo
- Bishop of West Buganda
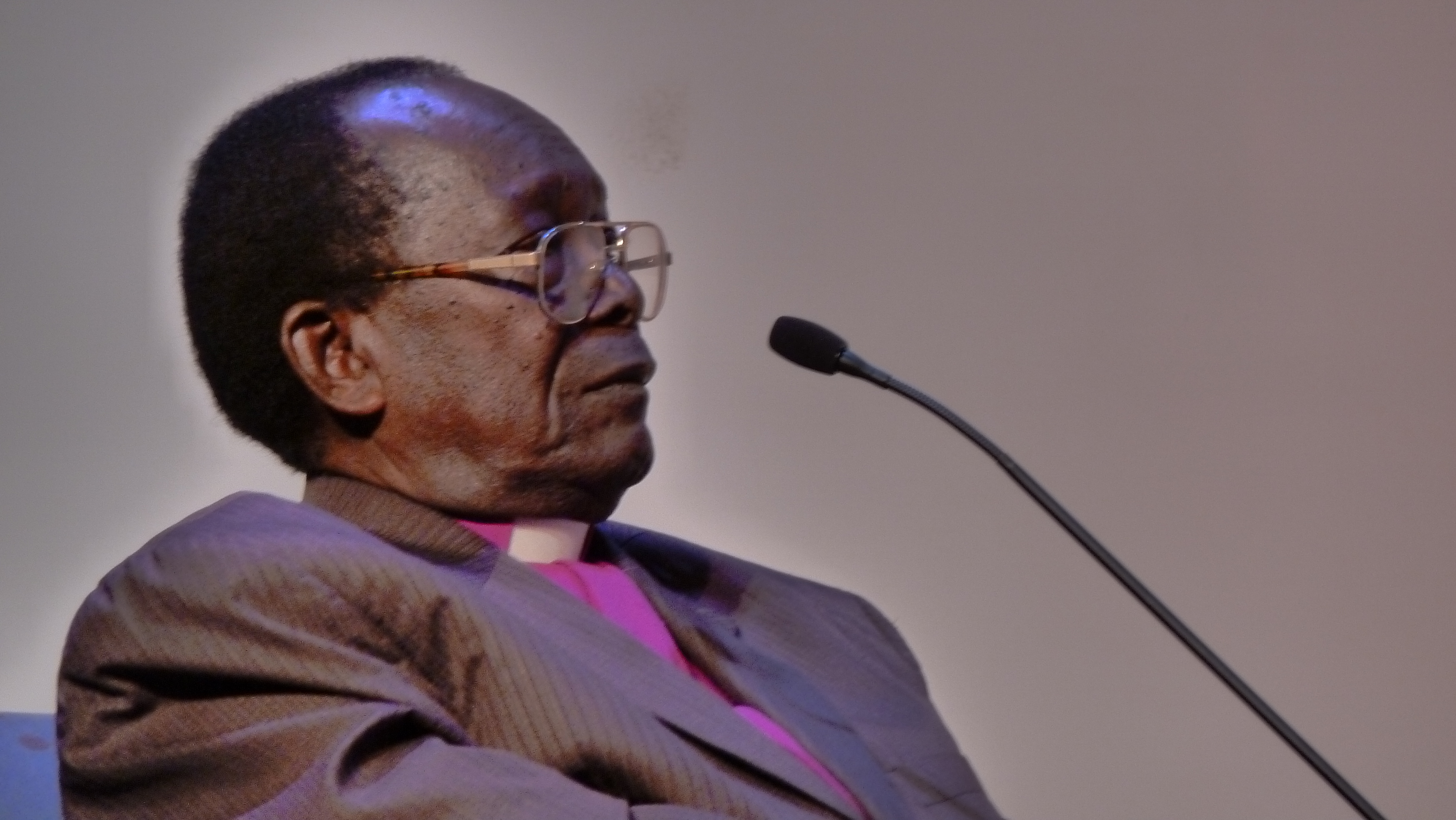
- Prohibited by the Church of Uganda from wearing the robes of a bishop, Senyonjo often wore the purple shirt and clerical collar of the office.
- Church: Church of Uganda
- Diocese: West Buganda
- Installed: 1974
- Term ended: 1998

Personal details
- Born: 8 December 1931 Uganda Protectorate
- Died: 19 July 2026 (aged 94)
- Denomination: Anglican
- Education: Buwalasi Theological College; Hartford Seminary

Christopher Senyonjo (also Ssenyonjo; 8 December 1931 – 19 July 2026) was a Ugandan Anglican bishop and campaigner for LGBT rights. He was ordained as a bishop in the Church of Uganda in 1974 and retired in 1998. In 2001, he was barred from celebrating services. Whilst it is widely claimed that this was because of his stance on gay rights, the church claims that it was because of his participation in the consecration of a man to be a bishop of a church with which the Church of Uganda is not in communion. He then worked with the Charismatic Church of Uganda and the progressive Episcopal Church of the United States, and founded Integrity Uganda and the Saint Paul's Reconciliation and Equality Centre in Kampala. In 2006 the Church of Uganda declared him "no longer a bishop" and revoked all remaining privileges for his involvement with the Charismatic denomination. For his stance, Senyonjo received several honours, including the Clinton Global Citizen Award, and was invited to participate in documentaries and international speaking tours.

== Background ==
=== Upbringing ===
Senyonjo was born to Maria Mukulu Abul'awawe and Erika Kapere on 8 December 1931, and was raised in the Mubende district (now Kiboga) of Singo county.

He attended Sinde Primary School until the age of 10, transferring to Bukomero Primary School, residing with paternal uncle Douglas Kyeyune and wife Miriam. An anecdote describes him walking 16 km to Nalukolongo for a kilogram of meat, which Miriam craved during her pregnancy, when the local trading centre did not have any.

His father died in 1944 and Senyonjo went to live with his aunt in Kiti near Kasangati. He continued to do well at Wampewo Primary School and after P.6 he attended King's College Budo in 1947. On holidays he sold pancakes for his aunt, leading to him being jailed for a night at the age of 13 by an officer who thought he must have stolen money from a locked donation box. He described being without blanket or shoes in a cell with people who were dirty and infected with lice.

In 1952 he entered Makerere University but failed to complete a course in medicine, which he attributes to spending too much time with friends because his upbringing had not prepared him for the freedom of the university. In 1954 he taught English, mathematics and health science at Luwule Secondary School.

=== Marriage and children ===
In 1959 he married his first wife, Ruth Nakanwagi, returning to work 17 days later; that same day she was killed by a venomous snake in her garden.

In 1963 he met his second wife, Mary, while she was working as a schoolteacher at Ndejje Demonstration School. They were married in December of that year. Mary later received cataract surgery in the United States while Senyonjo was speaking in Washington in 2011.

Senyonjo was the father of seven children, and adopted three. As of 2011, he was the grandfather of eight. He lived in Bukoto, a suburb of Kampala. Due to the revocation of his pension, he sustained himself on gifts from friends and his 10 children.

=== Death ===
Senyonjo died on 19 July 2026 at the age of 94.

== Religious training and service ==
After the death of his first wife in 1959, Senyonjo began attending church in remembrance of her. In 1960 he enrolled as a private candidate for the Uganda Advanced Certificate of Education, majoring in divinity. After consulting with his mother and his best friend, Hannington Kintu, he stated he had a dream of a candle that could not be extinguished, which he took as an affirmation of his calling to religious service. He began a three-year diploma course at Buwalasi Theological College in 1961, being ordained deacon two years later, after which he attended Union Theological Seminary in the United States. He was attached to an Episcopal Church of the Epiphany and mentored by Hugh McCandlas for priest ordination, later performed by Bishop Donegan in 1964. He was ordained in the Cathedral of St. John the Divine in New York City.

After returning to Uganda in 1968, Senyonjo was assigned to Theological College Mukuno. He taught on African traditional religion for four years.

In 1973 he worked with a group of Roman Catholic, Seventh-day Adventist and Anglican clergy to jointly translate the Bible into "modern Luganda".

Senyonjo served in the Church of Uganda and was chosen to fill the vacant position of bishop of the Diocese of West Buganda in 1974, a position he retained until his retirement in 1998.

In 1983, Senyonjo received a Doctor of Ministry degree from Hartford Theological Seminary, which provided key background for understanding issues of marriage and sexuality.

== Counselling practice ==
After his retirement in 1998, Senyonjo opened a counselling practice, making use of education in human sexuality and marriage counselling. In the course of his practice, he spoke sympathetically with gay clients, who referred one another to him. In his Kampala counselling practice, he saw up to 10 patients a day, charging $2.50 per session.

== LGBT outreach and advocacy ==
From 2001, Senyonjo was viewed as an important advocate for the Ugandan LGBTQ community. Believing that "one doesn't need to be converted first to another sexuality to be loved by God", Senyonjo founded Integrity Uganda as a branch of the Episcopal Church LGBT outreach organization Integrity USA. He founded a community centre as a safe place for Ugandan gays, and worked to provide housing and employment for those denied them after being outed.

In June 2008, Senyonjo explained his beliefs for the film Voices of Witness Africa. He said "Jesus left us the most important cardinal rule: 'Love one another as I have loved you.' And I cannot see how a person loves another by discriminating against that other person without going deep into what are the causes of this person to be what that person is. Humbly, without intimidation." He said that the Bible could be interpreted many ways, but that the real word of God was Jesus, the "Word made flesh", and that in the Gospel of Saint John, there were things that Jesus said he would not be able to reveal then, but that the Holy Spirit would reveal over time.

In 2009, Senyonjo attended an anti-gay conference from March 5–7, 2009, titled "Exposing the truth behind homosexuality and the homosexual agenda", which featured the American activists Scott Lively, Exodus International executive Don Schmierer, and International Healing Foundation representative Caleb Lee Brundidge. Described by Lively as a "nuclear bomb against the gay agenda in Uganda", the conference associated gays with Nazism, child molestation, AIDS and the Rwandan genocide, and has been credited with bringing about unprecedented persecution culminating in the Uganda Anti-Homosexuality Act, 2014. Senyonjo described the interaction of conference participants with government officials as leading to the introduction of the bill, and the need for education regarding claims of homosexual recruitment in schools. Senyonjo said "I was at one time accused that I was going to schools and trying to recruit, as it were, people into homosexuality, which is actually blackmail. And you can see, what are the intentions of these people to do this? ... People who will say this, they have very evil intentions which I don’t understand."

Senyonjo testified against the anti-gay bill and was part of a delegation to the Speaker of the House to oppose it. He said that it was inhumane, violated the UN Declaration of Human Rights and "the sacred bonds of the Ugandan extended family", would make Uganda a police state, and increase the spread of HIV as people would be afraid to seek treatment. He responded to its passage noting that homosexuality is not a sin, saying "People here don't understand what homosexuality is. If they did, I don't think they would have allowed this law."

In May and June 2010, at the age of 78, Senyonjo made a six-week speaking tour of the United States and Ireland, organized by the Reverend Canon Albert Ogle. He spoke in Los Angeles, Sacramento, San Diego, Orange County, San Francisco, Minneapolis, New York City, Belfast, and Dublin. During the tour he attended the ordination of the Rt Rev. Mary Glasspool, the first lesbian bishop of the Episcopal Church, as part of a six-week tour.

In 2010, Senyonjo founded the St. Paul's Foundation for International Reconciliation to support LGBT equality internationally. He was the executive director of St. Paul's Reconciliation and Equality Centre (SPREC) in Kampala, Uganda. SPREC's programs include healthcare, chapel and counselling, psycho-social support and hospitality, entrepreneurship development (micro-loans), women's empowerment, and human rights advocacy and education. In Uganda the Centre has partnered with Freedom and Roam Uganda, Spectrum Uganda Initiatives Incorporated, Rainbow Health Foundation Mbarara, and Sexual Minorities Uganda.

In February 2011, Senyonjo responded to the murder of David Kato with an open letter to Archbishop Rowan Williams and the Anglican Communion, calling on the church to speak out against the persecution of gay people.

He appeared in the documentary film God Loves Uganda, which was filmed around the time of Kato's death in 2011. It premiered at the 2013 Sundance Film Festival. The documentary focused on the activities of the International House of Prayer, which promoted an anti-gay agenda.

In September 2011, Senyonjo came to the United States again on a tour called "Compass for Compassion", speaking at locations including the All Souls Memorial Episcopal Church in Washington, D.C.

In March 2014, at the age of 82, Senyonjo continued to minister to congregants in a makeshift church the size of a small office in Kampala, though their numbers were reduced to a handful, possibly due to intimidation. Services are held every Sunday, where the congregation sings "What a Friend We Have in Jesus", but elements popular in other Ugandan churches such as praise shouts, speaking in tongues, and Bible thumping are omitted. For his support, Senyonjo is regarded as an "elder" of the LGBT community.

Senyonjo was an inaugural contributor to Bombastic Magazine, a publication concerning the Ugandan LGBTI community that was launched in December 2014.

He joined protesters for LGBTI rights, making a presentation in Jamaica at the 2016 Montego Bay Pride parade.

On 17 July 2018, the University of Leeds awarded him the honorary degree of Doctor of Laws for his work as cleric and LGBT human rights defender in Uganda.

== Reactions ==
In response to his ministry in Integrity Uganda, Senyonjo was told by Church of Uganda superiors to condemn the group and tell its members that they needed to convert to Christianity. Because of his disagreement with this position, and his refusal to condemn five young men he was counselling in 2001, his functions of vesting and laying on of hands were inhibited by the archbishop of the Church of Uganda on behalf of the House of Bishops of Uganda in 2002, his pension for 24 years of service was stopped, and he stated that he began receiving death threats and harassment.

In 2006, Archbishop Henry Luke Orombi speaking for the Church of Uganda denounced the Charismatic Church of Uganda as a "rebel denomination" and responded by completely dissociating itself from Senyonjo and stating that he was no longer a bishop and that they had "advised all civil authorities in Uganda that any licence held by Ssenyonjo for which his ordination in the Church of Uganda was an indispensable qualification shall now be null and void." Senyonjo responded, "I was consecrated in the Church of God. I belong to the Church in the royal priesthood of all believers." He said he was still a member of the Church of Uganda, and his only connection with the Charismatic Church of Uganda was to provide them with services when invited.

California Senate Resolution 51, which called for greater scrutiny of the use of Section 501(c)(3) charitable status to lobby for discriminatory policies in other countries, noted Senyonjo "has been touring California, the United States, and Europe to educate and bring attention to the draconian impact of a recent wave of religious-based homophobia in Uganda", resolving in part that "the Senate commends the work and ministry of Right Reverend Christopher Senyonjo in his attempts to create an inclusive church and society in Uganda that is free from discrimination based on sexual orientation and gender identity."

Senyonjo was included in Huffington Post's list of the ten most influential people in religion in 2010. His entry noted, "The Bishop demonstrates what it means to have the courage of conviction, and faith enough to side with those whom Jesus called 'the least of these.'"

He was featured in the award-winning 2012 documentary Call Me Kuchu and God Loves Uganda (2013).

In 2012 Senyonjo was honoured by former U.S. president Bill Clinton with a Clinton Global Citizen Award for leadership in civil society.

The day after the passage of the anti-gay law in 2014, Senyonjo was included by the Ugandan tabloid Red Pepper among a widely publicized list of names and photos of "200 Top Homos", as an alleged gay "sympathizer". An article in Think Progress speculated that he could be imprisoned under provisions of the law that "A person who aids, abets, counsels or procures another to engage in acts of homosexuality commits an offence and is liable, conviction, to imprisonment for seven years." Another group opposing the law, Erasing 76 Crimes, cast doubt on the case, writing that Senyonjo's pastoral counselling was not a violation of the law, but noted that Nigerian Watch and Trending Newsroom had also picked up the story.
