= Simon Kaggwa Njala =

Ugandan journalist (born 1976)

- Born: 11 October 1976 (age 50); Kampala, Uganda
- Occupation: Journalist
- Years active: 2007–present

Simon Kaggwa Njala is a Ugandan journalist and media personality. He is most well-known internationally for his 2012 interview with LGBTQ activist Pepe Julian Onziema and anti-LGBTQ pastor Martin Ssempa, which became a viral video.

== Early life ==
Njala was born to a Catholic, Baganda family in Karoli Jinja, a parish of Kawempe, Kampala. The name Njala, meaning "hunger" in Luganda, was taken from his grandfather. Both of his parents were teachers, with his father serving as the headmaster at Karoli Jinja Primary School, which Njala also attended. Njala received his Uganda Certificate of Education and Uganda Advanced Certificate of Education during schooling in Kampala.

== Career ==
As an adult, Njala worked for Radio One as a journalist. On 12 April 2007, during live reporting on an environmentalist protest at the Centenary Park in Kampala against the destruction of Mabira Forest, riots occurred after some protesters attacked Asians, stoning an Indian man to death. Njala was injured when another Indian fled the scene in a truck, running over Njala and four children, all of whom survived. In 2008, while attending university, Njala became a writer for The Crusader, a Kampala-based newspaper. He then worked for as a presenter for Radio One and Akaboozi Ku Bbiri, hosting Uganda Speaks while with the latter through 2011. Njala joined NBS Television in 2012, hosting the TV talk shows Morning Breeze and The Eagle Show.

In December 2013, Njala was suspended from Radio One and Akaboozi on order of the networks' owner, Minister of Finance Maria Kiwanuka. Njala was let go along with several other presenters after they hosted political debates discussing the impeachment of Kampala Lord Mayor Erias Lukwago, who had his conviction reversed after the trial was declared null and void, with the suspension as a means of avoiding a potential lawsuit against the radio networks.

In March 2022, Njala called for transparency and official statements by the Catholic Church regarding allegations against St. Mary’s College Kisubi headmaster Deodati Aganyira, who was accused of being homosexual, which is criminalized in the country, and also suspected of a 2009 arson of the deputy headmaster's home in an attempt to destroy evidence. Njala reasoned that a lack of response from the church could be seen as an admission of guilt which could further scrutinise other church-affiliated institutions; the accusations against Aganyira were ultimately determined to have been unfounded and he retained his position until retirement.

=== Morning Breeze interview ===
The moment Njala asks the question

During an 18 December 2012 episode of the "Morning Breeze" TV show on NBS Television, Njala interviewed LGBTQ rights activist Pepe Julian Onziema about LGBTQ+ rights in Uganda. After introducing Onziema, Njala immediately asked, "Why are you gay?"

Njala then introduced a second guest, pastor and anti-gay activist Martin Ssempa. Seated across from Onziema, Ssempa began characterizing and criticising various alleged sexual practices of LGBT people using fruits and vegetables as props while shouting in both English and Luganda. The interview, which lasted 70 minutes, became the subject of various internet memes.

In September 2024, Njala started selling t-shirts bearing the "Why are you gay" phrase, following renewed interest when internet personality Andrew Tate made a post on Twitter, jokingly nominating Njala as a candidate for Vice President of the United States. In 2025, Njala said that he had planned out "thoughtful questions", having studied Ugandan laws regarding LGBTQ issues the night before the interview, but ultimately failed to present them. He viewed the interview critically in retrospect, given the heightened political climate with the then-recently reintroduced Anti-Homosexuality Bill, which was ultimately passed into law by the Parliament of Uganda in 2014 and intensified with the introduction of life imprisonment or the death penalty for homosexual acts in 2023, stating, "I was too naive. I sounded silly by asking silly questions. ‘Why are you gay?’ Isn’t that silly?".

=== Politics ===
In 2016, Njala ran as an independent for a position as Member of Parliament for Busiro South Constituency in Wakiso District. He was defeated in the election by Peter Sematimba of the National Resistance Movement, who was considered an unlikely winner. The election resulted in a feud between Njala and the second-placed candidate, Stephen Musisi Sekigozi of the Democratic Party, whose father Patrick Musisi, and brother, JB Mutebi Musisi had previously served as Busiro South MP. Njala had accused Sekigozi of funding his campaign using unreported income while both blamed each other for splitting the DP voter base. In 2022, Njala openly aligned himself with the Democratic Party, but was critical of its DP leader and Minister of Justice Norbert Mao, saying Mao "made the party lose its identity" and "lacked the credentials of a Democrat". Njala unsuccessfully ran two more times in 2021 and 2025 for the Busiro South Constituency, both times defeated by Charles Matovu of the National Unity Platform.

== Temporary suspension from NBS Television ==
On 21 June 2024, Njala held a thanksgiving event for a member of Uganda's parliamentary opposition, Mathias Mpuuga, in Masaka. Njala also sent a series of pro-Mpuuga and anti–National Unity Platform messages on X (formerly known as Twitter).

Days later, Njala's employer, Next Media, suspended him for two weeks from NBS TV and circulated a statement emphasising that the company's ethics policies concerning journalistic objectivity forbid journalists from "public association with political parties, alliances, coalitions, or related matters that could undermine our principles."
