= Kasha Nabagesera =

Ugandan LGBT rights activist

Kasha Jacqueline Nabagesera
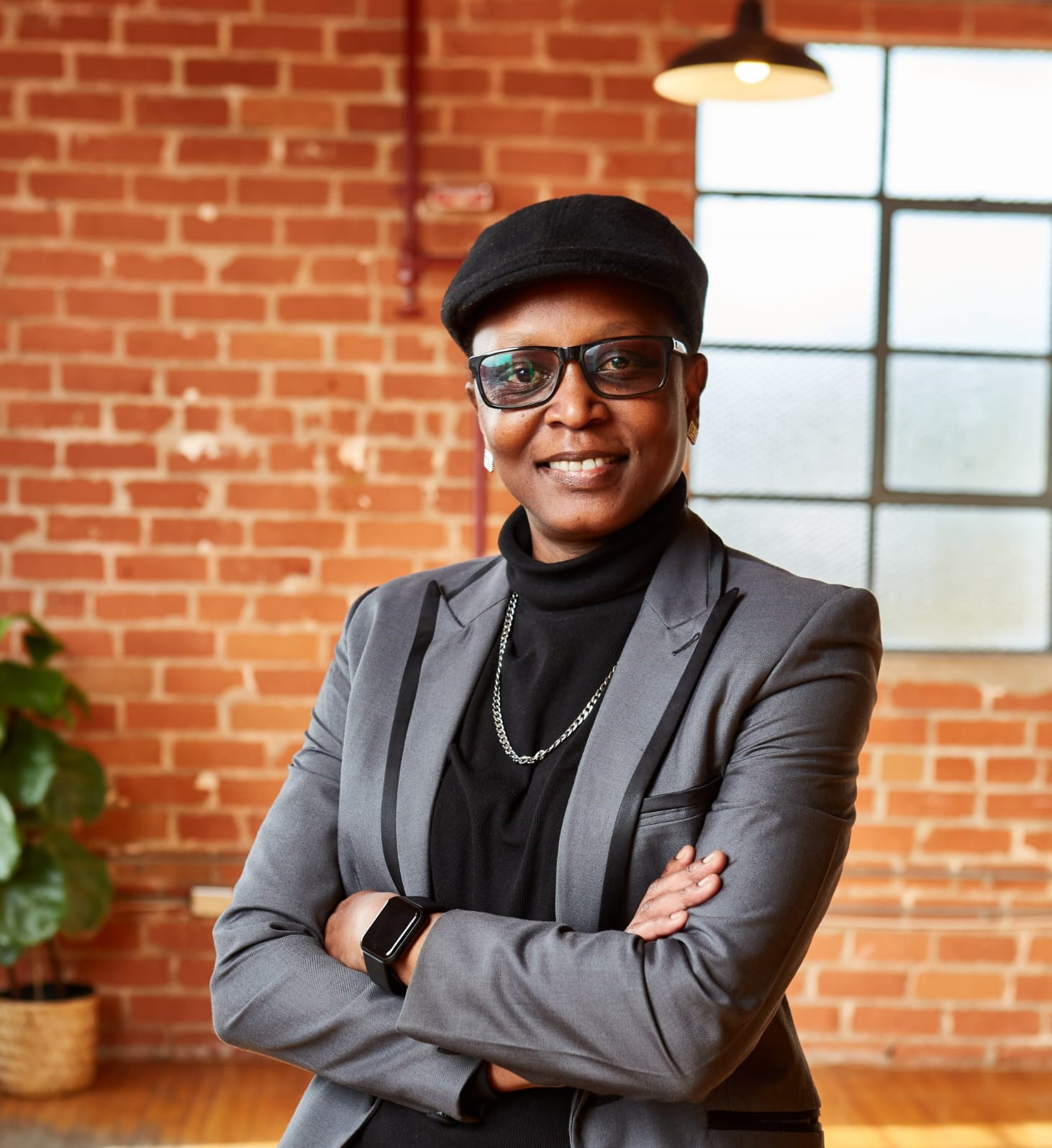
- Nabagesera in 2024
- Born: 1979 or 1980 (age 45–46)
- Occupation: LGBTQ rights activist
- Organization: Freedom & Roam Uganda
- Awards: Martin Ennals Award for Human Rights Defenders, Right Livelihood Award

Kasha Jacqueline Nabagesera (also known as Jacqueline Kasha) (born c. 1980) is a Ugandan LGBTQ rights activist and the founder and executive director of the LGBT rights organisation Freedom & Roam Uganda (FARUG). She received the Martin Ennals Award for Human Rights Defenders in 2011 and the Right Livelihood Award in 2015.

== Education ==
Nabagesera attended many schools after being continually suspended and expelled due to her sexual orientation, as it was discovered that she wrote love letters to other girls. She attended; Gayaza Junior School, Maryhill High School, Mariam High School, and Namasagali College. While at Nkumba University, she studied accounting and earned a bachelor's degree in business administration, and in 2004 she took a degree course in information technology and a certificate in marketing from the New Vision Group in Kampala. In 2005, she enrolled at Human Rights Education Associates, a human rights education and global training center for distance learners based in Massachusetts, USA. In 2006, she completed a certificate in journalism at the Johannesburg Media School, where she trained students from African countries such as Botswana, Zimbabwe, Zambia, and Uganda in activism. In 2008, she was certified to "train the trainers" by the Frontline Human Rights Defenders in Dublin, Ireland.

== Activism ==
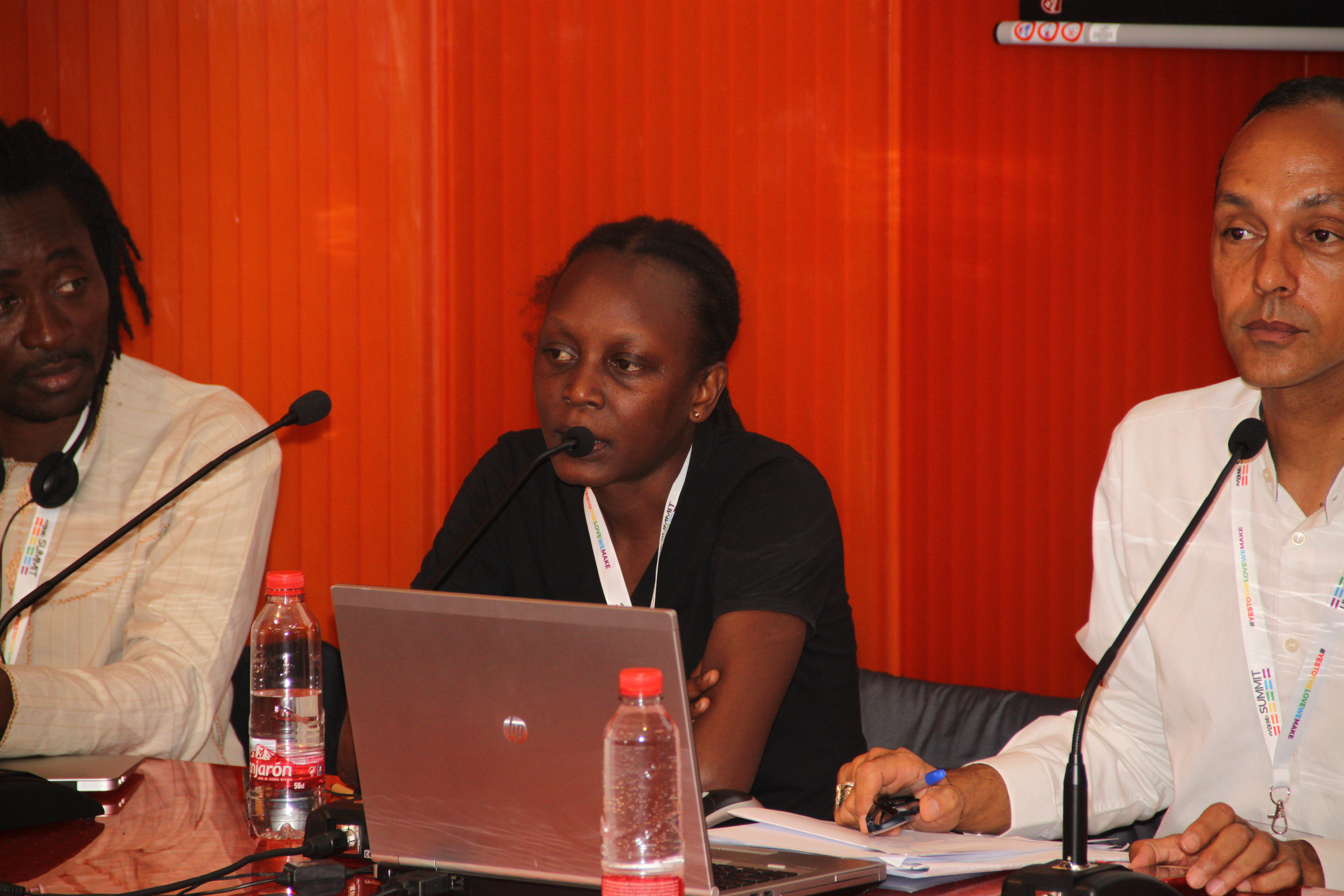
Nabagesera at the panel about the African view on LGBT issues at WorldPride Madrid

In 1999, she campaigned to end homophobia in Uganda, where homosexuality is illegal.

In 2010, Ugandan newspaper Rolling Stone published names and photos of people believed to be homosexual, with the headline "Hang Them". It listed Nabagesera and her colleague David Kato, both of whom sued the tabloid and set a precedence for "legal steps" on human rights violation in Uganda.Nabagesera explained it set a precedence as an attempt to protect “privacy and the safety we all have against incitements to violence”. Kato was later killed following the legal battle with the publication.

Nabagasera has continued the fight for gay rights in Uganda. Under FARUG, she has fought to decriminalize homosexuality in Uganda by circumventing the Ugandan anti-homosexuality bill. She refers to it as a Nuremberg law that mandates stiff sentences ranging from prison sentences to the death penalty, which also rules that citizens who do not report homosexuals to the authorities can face up to three years in jail.

In 2011, Nabagesera was said to be the only founding member of the LGBT movement from the 90s still living in Uganda. She spoke at the 2017 WorldPride summit in Madrid, and led a discussion about LGBTQIA+ in Africa with Najma Kousri from Tunisia, South African Yahia Zaidi, Alimi Bisi Ademola from Nigeria, and Michèle Ndoki from Cameroon.

Nabagesera tried to adopt a child in Uganda, as the adoption process does not use sexuality as a bar to adoption in Uganda, but she was told that she could not adopt because she "wasn't palatable".

In 2013 Nabagesera founded a magazine, Bombastic, with writing from LGBT Ugandans about the discrimination they had experienced.

== Awards ==
Velvetpark magazine, an international queer women's magazine, described Nabagesera as a "Braveheart” and voted her the most inspiring queer woman in the world in 2010.

In 2011, Nabagesera was named in the centenary celebration of International Women's Day. That same year she was a guest speaker at the Geneva Summit for Human Rights and Democracy. Nabagesera was listed among the 50 most inspiring Feminist Women in Africa in 2011 and is the first gay rights activist to receive the Martin Ennals Award for Human Rights Defenders. According to Michelle Kagari of Amnesty International, the award "recognises [Nabagesera's] tremendous courage in the face of discrimination and violence against LGBT people in Uganda. Her passion to promote equality and her tireless work to end a despicable climate of fear is an inspiration to LGBT activists the world over ..."

In November 2011, she was awarded the Rafto Prize in Bergen, Norway, with Sexual Minorities Uganda, an umbrella organization that she co-founded in 2004.

In February 2013, Nabagesera was given the Honorary Award of QX magazine in Stockholm, Sweden. That same year in April, she received the James Joyce Award from the University College Dublin, the Sean McBride Award from Amnesty International Dublin, the Civil Courage Prize in Berlin, the International Activist of the Year Award for the GALAS (Gay and Lesbian Awards, organised by the National Lesbian and Gay Federation of Ireland), and the Nuremberg International Human Rights Award.

In 2015, she won the Right Livelihood Awards for her "courage and persistence, despite violence and intimidation, in working for the right of LGBTI people to a life free from prejudice and persecution".

In April 2019, Nabagesera was presented with the Bonham Centre Award from The Mark S. Bonham Centre for Sexual Diversity Studies, University of Toronto, for her contributions to the advancement and education of issues surrounding sexual identification.

In December 2024, Nabagesera was included on the BBC's 100 Women list.

== See also ==
- List of LGBT rights activists
- LGBT rights in Uganda
