= Giles Muhame =

Ugandan journalist

- Born: 1988 (age 37–38); Ibanda District, Uganda
- Education: Makerere University (BA)
- Occupations: Journalist, editor,
- Organization: Chimpreports
- Known for: News editing, journalism

Giles Muhame is a Ugandan journalist, news editor who made international news in 2010 and 2011 for his efforts to out homosexuals. He is the co-founder of Chimpreports; a daily tabloid newspaper published in Kampala, Uganda.

== Early life and education background ==
Muhame was born in 1988, Ibanda District in Western Uganda. He holds a bachelor's degree in journalism and mass communication from Makerere University.

== Career ==
In August 2010, he founded the tabloid newspaper Rolling Stone, In 2014, he founded Chimpreports, an online news portal based in Uganda. Muhame wrote a story about the 'handshake' story, which exposed government officials who had awarded themselves large sums of money after winning a court case against Tullow Oil. He has covered the conflicts in Somalia, Democratic Republic of Congo and South Sudan. He is a member on the National Taskforce on 4th Industrial Revolution Technologies.

== Other considerations ==
Muhame has interests in media consultant, e-commerce entrepreneur, farming and real estate. He mentioned Julian Assange and Bob Woodward as his role models. He serves as the president Uganda Online Media Publishers Association since 2016.

== External references ==
- Biography of Giles Muhame
- Where Being Gay Is a Life-and-Death Struggle
- Giles Muhame
- Death by Tabloid
