= Katherine Fairfax Wright =

American filmmaker and documentarian

- Occupation: documentary filmmaker
- Known for: Call Me Kuchu

Katherine Fairfax Wright is an American filmmaker and documentarian, best known as co-director with Malika Zouhali-Worrall of the 2012 film Call Me Kuchu.

Her other credits include an episode of the PBS television series POV, and the drama films Les vulnérables, Fat Friend and Gabi on the Roof in July.
