= Najma Kousri =

Tunisian lawyer, journalist and feminist

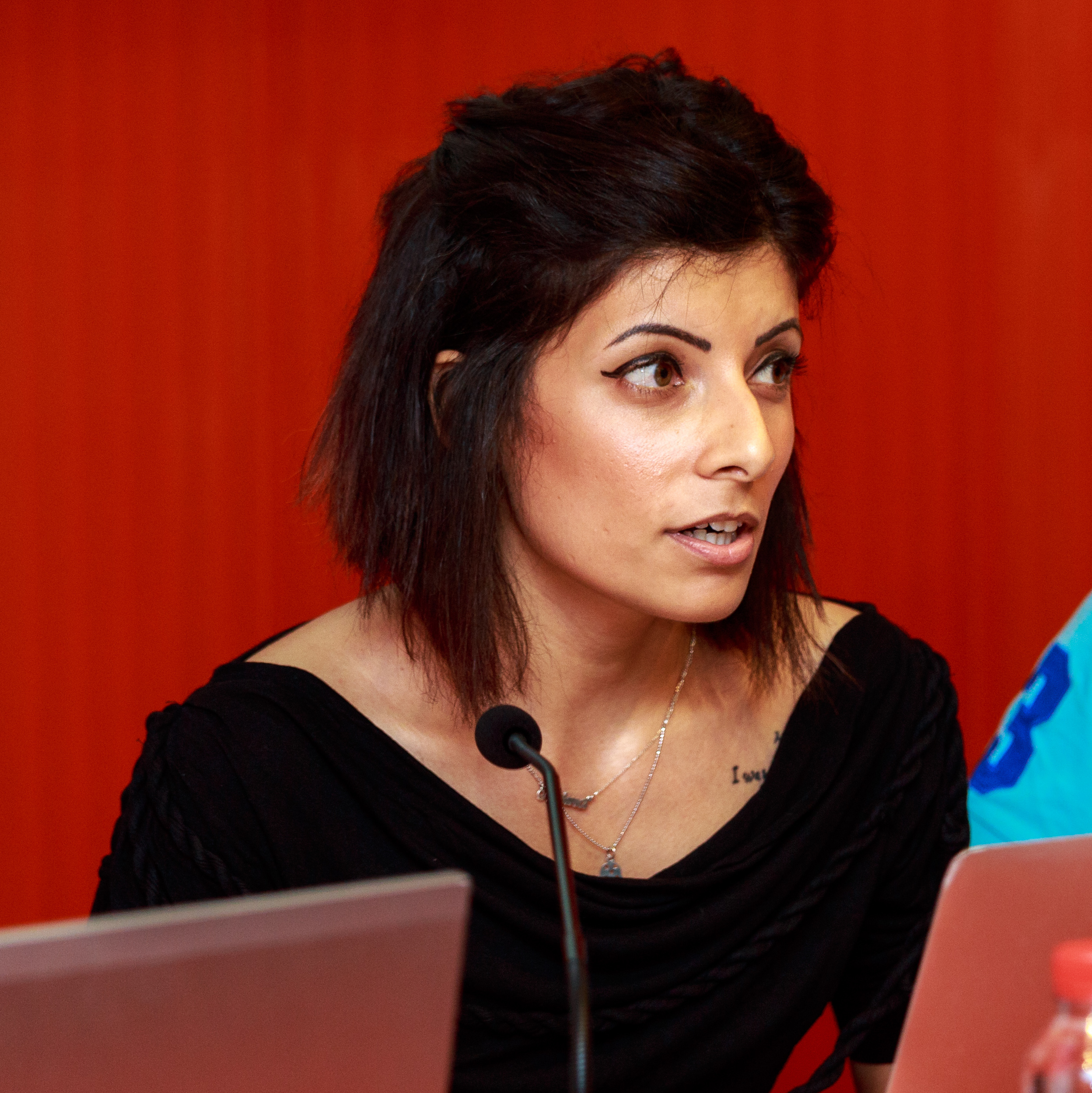
- at WorldPride 2017 in Madrid
- Born: 1991 (age 34–35)
- Occupation: lawyer
- Known for: leading Tunisian rights activist

Najma Kousri (Arabic: نجمة العبيدي القوصري, also known as Najma Kousri Labidi; born 1991) is a Tunisian feminist and LGBT-rights activist. Kousri is a co-founder of the #EnaZeda (Tunisian #MeToo) movement and a co-ordinator of the Tunisian Association of Democratic Women. She is a campaigner for LGBT rights and her photographic project documenting the lives of same-sex couples went viral in 2017.

== Biography ==
Kousri has a Tunisian degree which licences her to practice law and she studied for a master's degree in Sweden, with a dissertation that focused on digital technology and social change. She says her political activism is a product of her family's struggles against former the authoritarian president Zine El Abidine Ben Ali.

Kousri began activism against sexual harassment in Tunisian society while a law student, reporting cases to the police despite their dismissive attitude.

Her political journalism has commented on a variety of subjects including: support for presidential candidate Hamma Hammami, the arrest of blogger Yassine Ayari, the assassination of Shaimaa al-Sabbagh who was leader of the Popular Socialist Alliance in Egypt, democracy in Tunisia, on human rights activist Khedija Cherif, on unionist Houcine Abassi, as well as other topics.

Kousri has also spoken out against sexual violence against Yezidi women by members of Islamic State. She has added a voice of criticism to the work of Tunisian politician Monia Ibrahim who opposed a law that would expand women's rights in the country. As a law student, Kousri spoke out against the Islamist government and how Tunisia's politics needed to move to the left.

== #EnaZeda ==
In 2019, Kousri became one of the co-founders of the Tunisian #MeToo movement. Called #EnaZeda (Arabic: أنا زادة) in Tunisia, Kousri said that it "is simply the culmination of a struggle that has been going on for years". As of November 2019, the movement's Facebook group had over 21,600 members; it is a place where protest is organised and also provides a safe space for testimony from survivors. Kousri described the success of the movement as owing a debt to the way that women in Egypt had spoken out for their own civil rights. She also credits the power of #EnaZeda in gathering momentum quickly - previous campaigns about harassment on public transport by feminist organisations did not capture the imagination of women in Tunisia in the same way. Kousri has discussed how she observed that after the uprisings of December 2010, sexual violence against women increased and became more violent. The movement reveals the scale of the problem and shows that silencing victims does not solve problems of sexual aggression in societies.

== Tunisian Association of Democratic Women ==
Kousri is a co-coordinator with the Association Tunisienne des Femmes Démocrates (Tunisian Association of Democratic Women, ATFD), a feminist campaign organisation. Within the ATFD, Kousri's portfolio is on the Commission on Sexual & Reproductive Rights. She was a joint signatory with the Coalition for Sexual and Bodily Rights in Muslim Societies (CSBR) in an open letter to Recep Tayyip Erdoğan condemning the murder and torture of Hande Kader.

In 2017, she spoke out on behalf of the organisation against the law that bans marriage between Muslim women and non-Muslims in Tunisia. In 2019, she led a campaign encouraging the state to re-engage with women's reproductive health as a concern - with cuts in funding, women's access to contraception had declined.

== LGBTQI* Rights ==
Kousri is an active advocate for LGBT rights in Tunisia, where homosexuality is illegal.

In 2014 she spoke out against the increase in violence against LGBT communities in Egypt. She condemned the actions of journalist Mona Iraqi, who published the identities of 26 men arrested at a Cairo hammam on charges of "indecency".

In 2015 Kousri posted a series of images of same-sex couples on social media, which went viral. The project "Sexuality Is Not Taboo" was aimed at making visible LGBT communities from Tunisia. She said of the project:

My photo project aims to use the internet to provoke people to reflect on sexual rights. We carried out the revolution, and we refuse to go on being harassed, punished, or pushed around for what we do in the bedroom. By publishing photos of same-sex couples kissing in public spaces, I hope to push forward the debate about gay rights in Tunisia that has been gaining momentum since the start of the revolution.

In the same year, she was arrested in what was reported by the Tunisian Le Temps as an unlawful arrest of a kind characteristic of police harassment of women.

Kousri was one of the speakers at the WorldPrideSummit in 2017 in Madrid. She led a discussion about LGBTQIA+ in Africa with Kasha Nabagesera from Uganda, South African Yahia Zaidi, Alimi Bisi Ademola from Nigeria and Michèle Ndoki from Cameroon.

In 2017, Kousri was fired by the fundraising department of SOS Children's Villages, as a direct result of her activism. The reason given for the dismissal was that Kousri's work on countering discrimination to LGBT communities could also "be damaging" to children.
