= Martin Ssempa =

Ugandan pastor (born 1968)

- Born: 3 January 1968 (age 58); Masaka District, Uganda
- Other name: Gabriel Baaba Gwanga'mujje eri yesu
- Citizenship: Uganda; United States (formerly)
- Education: Makerere University (BA); Cairn University (MA)
- Occupations: Pastor, anti-gay activist
- Spouse: Tracey Ssempa
- Children: 5

Martin Ssempa (born 3 January 1968) is a Ugandan charismatic pastor, activist, and the founder of the Makerere Community Church. Ssempa first came to international prominence in 2010, after a presentation video he made at his church, which showcased his opposition to homosexuality, went viral.

== Early life and education ==
Martin Ssempa was born in Nalusali village in Masaka District in 1968, the youngest of eight children to a Muganda mother. He did not know his father, who was Indian and expelled from the country during the presidency of Idi Amin. Ssempa was named after his grandfather. His mother, a teacher, raised her son alone and he changed schools often as a child. Ssempa went to Kimanya Primary School in Masaka and St. Peter's Primary School in Nsambya. He then went to Rubaga Boys' Secondary School, before he completed his A level at Namilyango College.

In 1988, Ssempa was admitted to Makerere University, from where he graduated in 1991 with a bachelor's degree in social science, specialising in sociology. In 1992, he started studying at Philadelphia Biblical University (Cairn University since 2012), obtaining a Master of Arts degree in biblical counselling. Around 2008, Ssempa received an honorary PhD from Cairn.

=== Personal life ===
In 1997, Ssempa was part of a student group at Makerere University that founded a weekly musical gospel rally, SANJA (short for Saturday Night Jams), following concerns over increased alcohol consumption and sex activity during nightclub visits by students. In 1999, Ssempa and four other students renamed SANJA to Prime Time, gradually becoming an general entertainment event, ranging from music, comedy, and poetry acts, as well as speeches by local businesspeople, pastors and politicians, as well as a HIV awareness program, featuring testimony from pastors, doctors and those living with HIV.

While in the United States, Ssempa met his wife Tracey, a missionary at the time, whom he married on 25 April 1992. According to a voter registration application submitted on 6 July 2012, Ssempa is a United States citizen.

In December 2018, Ssempa announced that he will be "transitioning" to the alternative name Gabriel Baaba Gwanga'Mujje eri Yesu starting 2019. According to Ssempa, the first name was chosen to mean "I stand in God's presence" (a quote by the archangel Gabriel), the middle name as in "Father of a new generation", while the last name is Luganda for "Nations are summoned to Jesus". In a 2019 interview on the Urban Television program Urban Today, Ssempa stated that the name change was motivated by "curiosity" and to more openly show his Baganda background. He remained known by his original name, but occasionally used the alias during interviews and speeches.

In July 2026, Ssempa stated that he had voluntarily renounced his United States citizenship. In an interview with MBU, he said that his decision was influenced by legal issues and by an International Criminal Court report concerning Uganda. There had been previous attempts to invoke Ssempa's citizenship to have him testify before a US federal court as a witness in a lawsuit against Scott Lively, a fellow anti-LGBT pastor, by the Ugandan LGBT advocacy group Sexual Minorities Uganda.

== Career ==
=== Ministry ===
Ssempa's religious interests began when he joined a bible study group in school, in hopes of starting a relationship with a female schoolmate, later recalling "[M]y focus was not on Jesus but on the girl herself". While he failed to enter a relationship with the schoolmate, Ssempa credits the bible study with making him a born-again Christian. He initially sought to become a Catholic priest, but at age 18, he instead joined a Baptist congregation.

During his time at Makere University, both Ssempa's brother and sister contracted HIV. Ssempa sat by their beds as they grew sicker. When they died in 1990, he blamed their promiscuity and feared that his lifestyle would also lead to his death via AIDS. Ssempa gave up on his initial plans of becoming an international performing artist and converted to Evangelical Christianity at the Wandegeya Baptist Youth Center. He travelled the country with a drama group that performed in schools in an effort to educate students about AIDS.

In 1996, Ssempa founded the Makerere Community Church on the campus of Makerere University, in a building he dubbed the "White House".

=== Activism ===
Ssempa has advocated a cessation of tribal rivalries and hatred in Uganda.

Ssempa opposes the separation of church and state and the use of condoms to prevent HIV contraction, and supports abstinence plus fidelity education in the fight against sexual diseases. He claims to be leading a crusade to "kick sodomy out of Uganda, endorsing proposed legislation in Uganda that makes certain homosexual acts punishable by life in prison or, in some severe cases of rape, death". In 2007, Ssempa organised a rally, in which a speaker suggested the systematic killing of gays and lesbians through intentional mass starvation. In 2009, Ssempa doxxed several gay men by name and workplace.

He is a strong advocate of the Uganda Anti-Homosexuality Bill, although he was not in support of the capital punishment as a penalty, which was formerly included in the bill. He champions the bill by showing gay pornography, depicting fisting, anilingus, and coprophilia in his church and at conferences. These sermons became a viral meme on the internet as "Eat Da Poo Poo". He has become a popular Internet meme due to this and his many other anti-homosexual performances, most notably an appearance on the NBS Television breakfast television show Morning Breeze, opposite LGBT activist Pepe Julian Onziema. He has become known as "the Pasta" and "Pasta Senpai" in these memes.

Of the bill, Ssempa has stated the following:

Some people have asked about the rationale of a death penalty mentioned in the Bill. There has been a lot of misinformation about this matter with headlines such as: “Gays face death penalty in Uganda”. These headlines are deliberately misleading. This penalty applies only in special cases termed 'aggravated homosexuality', which include, those convicted of unlawful homosexual rape of a child or handicapped invalid; this is a conviction of paedophilles! As highlighted in the problem of 'virgin rape cures HIV/AIDS' the offender can be a person living with HIV; a parent or guardian of the victim where there is abuse of authority! Finally is the use of drugs to stupefy the child so that they can rape them! Clearly, the intent of this penalty is to protect weaker members of society from being victimized. Please note that for over 15 years Uganda has had the same penalty for persons who have carnal knowledge of minors heterosexually, mainly to protect against sexual abuse of girls by men. This time, this provision intends to provide equal protection of boys, among others.

In April 2025, Ssempa published a book, Why Are You Geh?: Africa's Resistance to Homosexuality, described as "a provocative 500-page manifesto that positions itself as both a personal memoir and a cultural defence of the traditional African family", which "argues that the global LGBTQ movement is being used as a vehicle to impose foreign values on African societies through media, donor aid, and diplomacy". The book's launch event was sponsored by Speaker of Parliament Anita Among and hosted by comedian Patrick Salvado Idringi, as well as attended by President Yoweri Museveni, as the Guest of Honour, and Minister of Trade David Bahati, all of whom praised the book's contents. Ugandan media reporting on the book's release incorrectly attribute the book's eponymous quote to Ssempa, when it was uttered by Morning Breeze host Simon Kaggwa Njala. Following the assassination of American right-wing activist Charlie Kirk in September 2025, Ssempa claimed that the assassination was "evidence of @BarackObama world wide LGBTQ executive order [sic] which weaponized the entire US government to impose these Sodomies on the civilized world", alleging that the killing was planned by "LGBTQ forums" and repeating disproven rumours about the shooter being transgender.

==== Criticism ====
In 2014, Ugandan writer Paul Kaliisa criticized him for promoting homosexuality due to his screenings of gay pornographic videos in churches, and mentioned that these actions should be subject to sanctions under the Uganda Anti-Homosexuality Bill.

=== Influence ===
Ssempa's international influence has been exhibited through his work with a branch of the U.S. Agency for International Development, the President's Emergency Plan for AIDS Relief (PEPFAR), which provided him with at least $90,000 in funds. Because of his involvement in light of the anti-gay bill he backs in his own country, PEPFAR has been labelled by gay and lesbian support groups as promoting homophobia.

In addition to his anti-gay agenda, Ssempa has co-authored Uganda's 2004 "Abstinence and Being Faithful" AIDS policy; this policy is a revision of the previous "ABC Program" – Abstinence, Being Faithful, and Condom Usage. As well, he is a special representative of the Task Force on AIDS of Ugandan First Lady Janet Museveni. He has testified before the United States Congress on the HIV/AIDS epidemic in Africa.

Ssempa is opposed to abortion. He cited his mother's refusal to terminate her pregnancy, despite repeated threats by Ssempa's biological father and his family, as they did not want her to give birth to a mixed race child.

Ssempa has stated his belief that the absence of a father in black families contributes to juvenile delinquency, maintaining that single mothers "can’t raise kids appropriately" as they "usually shower [their children] with lots of love".

In the past, Ssempa was associated with Rick Warren and Saddleback Church's HIV/AIDS Initiative. Between 2005 and 2006, Ssempa often appeared alongside Warren and his wife during the service at Warren's megachurch. During this time period, he served as keynote speaker at Warren's Disturbing Voices AIDS conference. Warren has since distanced himself from Ssempa and completely severed ties with him in 2007.

In February 2024, Ssempa asked the Committees of Legal and Parliamentary Affairs and Gender, Labour and Social Development at the Parliament of Uganda to "legalise polygamy for Christians, criminalise adultery and set a minimum number of times for couples to honour their conjugal obligations" in the upcoming Marriage Bill, 2024. Ssempa claimed that there was no biblical basis against polygamy, stating that many Christian Ugandans already had multiple marriages. Some women's rights activists voiced support if the change also included polyandry; Ssempa subsequently retracted polygamy from his proposal. In regards to the other two requests, Ssempa argued that infidelity was not punished severely enough and that little to no sex in marriage contributed to domestic violence, stating a new law should render marriage void if a couple did not have sex within six months following their ceremony. He advocated for a mandatory minimum amount of marital sex, numbering three times a week, with criminal penalties should this not be upheld. In February 2025, Members of Parliament denied the proposal. He subsequently apologised for his "misunderstood and misinterpreted" views on polygamy, saying that he personally practices monogamy and had specifically been referring to Christian converts, whose previous faiths allowed multiple marriages, as a means to "sort out their polygamous marriage provided for in the Bible through Discipleship and Grace, according to Titus 2:11-13".

=== Music ===
During his teenage years, Ssempa became a celebrity across East Africa as the national break dancing champion in Uganda. According to New Vision, he "surviv[ed] HIV/AIDS narrowly" due to his active sex life during this career. In 2019, Ssempa criticised politician and entertainer Bobi Wine for using gospel songs to spread political messages. In 2022, he announced a return to the music industry, having already collaborated with rapper Gravity Omutujju in recording a song against homosexuality, with plans to perform regularly at booked events in churches and bars. In December 2023, Ssempa suggested that Gravity remix one of his recent songs, Okwepicha, to teach about HIV/AIDS, which Gravity declined, believing education about the topic should be between parents and their children. Ssempa is critical of the glorification of drug use in music and in October 2023, he organised prayer sessions for musicians with substance addictions, particularly marijuana.

== Legal issues ==
In October 2012, Ssempa and five other individuals were convicted in Buganda Road Court of conspiring to tarnish a rival pastor's reputation by falsely accusing him of engaging in homosexuality. The guilty verdict stemmed from a May 2009 incident in which Ssempa and the others engaged in a conspiracy to coerce male church members at Robert Kayanja's Rubaga Miracle Centre Cathedral to claim that they had sexual relations with Kayanja. Following a police investigation, the young men withdrew their accusations and claimed to have received a sum of money to claim that they had been raped by Pastor Kayanja. The six individuals, including Ssempa, were charged with defamation and sentenced to a fine of one million shillings each (about US$390) and one hundred hours of community service.

In July 2020, Ssempa was involved in a land dispute in Bumpenje village in Wakiso District. Fred Ssekibala had confronted Ssempa and his gardeners for clearing vegegation on a swath of land previously owned by Ssekibala's grandfather Samson Kasule. Although Ssempa showed Ssekibala and his group documents that showed his ownership of the property, Ssempa was beaten and threatened with a panga during the encounter before Kasanje police defused the situation. It was found that Ssempa had previously purchased four acres of land from Kasule before the latter's death, but Ssekibala maintained that Ssempa had trespassed on the twenty-one acres still in family possession.

In December 2022, Ssempa appeared before the Equal Opportunities Commission due to allegations of stigmatization of people with HIV after making critical remarks against the U19 Miss Uganda contest, accusing the organisers of encouraging the spread of HIV for including Gloria Nawanyaga, who had spoken out about being HIV positive since birth. In September 2023, Ssempa was found guilty and ordered to delete the disparaging comments from his social media within 14 days of the hearing's decision.

== See also ==
- LGBT rights in Africa
- LGBT rights in Uganda
- Solomon Male
- Zac Niringiye
