= Zac Niringiye =

Ugandan Anglican theologian and pastor

Zac Niringiye (born 1954) is a Ugandan Anglican theologian and pastor.

== Biography ==
Niringiye was born in 1954 in Bugumbira, Kisoro district. After a first degree in physics and a teaching diploma at Makerere University, Niringiye completed an MA at Wheaton College, Illinois in 1987 and a PhD at the University of Edinburgh in 1998, studying under T. Jack Thompson and David Kerr.

== Career ==
In 1980, Niringiye joined the Fellowship of Christian Unions (FOCUS) as the very first full-time staff of the organisation as the General secretary.

Niringiye worked as regional director for the Church Missionary Society, promoting missionary work in the whole of Africa. He was then consecrated Assistant Bishop of Kampala in 2005, taking an early retirement in 2012 to advocate for social justice in Uganda.

He had previously served as Regional Director of the Church Mission's work in Africa ministering among students in Uganda and all over English and Portuguese speaking Africa with the International Fellowship of Evangelical Students.

Niringiye and his wife are the founders of Relate communications and Wakisa ministries which help in doing Sexual reproductive health, HIV/AIDS, trauma and marriage counseling.

== Activism ==
Niringiye who was expected by many to focus on preaching the word of God and take care of the flock rediscovered that he can be a good activist. His activism and thirst for social justice in Uganda earned him a new name "Bishop of Black Monday".

On February 4th 2013, Niringiye was arrested and detained at Wandegeya Police station for allegedly distributing black Monday leaflets to citizens around Makerere University. He was later released on police bond.

Niringiye has been a big critique of Uganda's president Yoweri Museveni for overstaying in power, failing to fight corruption and failure to retire early. Niringiye has always been labeled as a man who doesn't mince his words in his criticism of government.

== Controversy ==
Niringiye is considered to be a controversial cleric. On many occasions, he has disagreed with fellow religious leaders on what seems to be of importance to the church.

== Attack ==
On july 29th 2021, Nirigiye who was walking back home from a morning jogging routine was attacked by unknown assailants. The assault left him with head injuries but fortunately, he managed to escape further harm.

== Personal life ==
Niringiye is married to Theodora Niringiye with whom they have 3 children (a boy and 2 girls).

== See also ==
- Martin Ssempa
- Aloysius Bugingo
- Robert Kayanja
