= LGBTQ rights in Uganda =

- Uganda
- Legal status: Illegal since 1902 (as Protectorate of Uganda)
- Penalty: Up to Capital punishment for "aggravated homosexuality"
- Gender identity: No
- Military: No
- Discrimination protections: Limited

Family rights
- Recognition of relationships: No recognition of same-sex unions
- Restrictions: Same-sex marriage constitutionally banned since 2005
- Adoption: No

Lesbian, gay, bisexual, transgender, and queer (LGBTQ) people in Uganda face severe challenges and discrimination not experienced by non-LGBTQ people. Uganda has one of the world's harshest laws for LGBTQ+ people. Same-sex sexual activity is illegal for both men and women in Uganda. The British Empire introduced the original laws criminalizing homosexual acts when Uganda became a British protectorate; these laws have been retained and significantly strengthened since the country gained its independence in 1962. Male same-sex sexual activity was understood to be present and largely unremarkable in many contexts in precolonial Ugandan society.

Although largely unenforced for decades, attempts to reinvigorate the application of anti-homosexuality laws has been ongoing since the 1990s. In the decades since, anti-gay rhetoric and efforts to introduce harsher laws have gained momentum, culminating in the Anti-Homosexuality Act, 2023, which prescribes up to twenty years in prison for "promotion of homosexuality", life imprisonment for "homosexual acts", and the death penalty for "aggravated homosexuality". This Act came into force in 2023, (Note: A draft version of the Act, the Anti-Homosexuality Bill (Bill no. 3 of 2023), generated international news coverage upon its first successful passage through the parliament. Had it been enacted unamended, it would have criminalised merely identifying as gay, lesbian or bisexual, transgender or non-binary, stipulating that "hold[ing] out as a lesbian, gay, transgender, a queer or any other sexual or gender identity that is contrary to the binary categories of male and female" was committing "an offence of homosexuality" and thus liable to the penalty of ten years in prison. This provision, 2(1)(d), was excluded from the Act that was finally passed and signed into law. Coverage on this earlier bill included: "Uganda passes a law making it a crime to identify as LGBTQ". Reuters. 22 March 2023.; "'Deeply troubling': UN rights chief on Uganda anti-gay bill" The Independent; "Uganda Anti-Homosexuality bill: Life in prison for saying you're gay". BBC News; "Cheers and applause as Uganda passes new bill banning identifying as LGBT" BBC News; "Ugandan MPs pass bill imposing death penalty for homosexuality" The Guardian; "Uganda's new anti-homosexuality law bans identification as LGBTQ" Aljazeera; "Uganda passes harsh new bill targeting LGBT+ community" ITV News; "UN rights chief calls Uganda anti-gay bill 'deeply troubling'" PBS News) making Uganda the only Christian-majority country to punish some types of consensual same-sex acts with the death penalty. Although there are no recorded executions in Uganda since 2005, and Uganda is considered a de facto abolitionist after a 2009 Ugandan Supreme Court ruling declaring mandatory death sentences were unconstitutional. A similar law had been passed in 2013, but was annulled on technical grounds in 2014. Same-sex marriage has been constitutionally banned since 2005. Some foreign governments and international organisations have rescinded funding to Uganda due to its extreme anti-LGBTQ legislation.

LGBTQ people face severe discrimination in Uganda, actively incited by conservative political, religious and community leaders, with the upsurge in such activism since the 1990s encouraged or influenced by foreign anti-LGBTQ campaigners. Violent attacks and harassment against LGBTQ people are common, often performed or incited by state officials.

== Precolonial context ==
There is widespread denial that homosexuality was practised before colonisation, and homosexuality is often considered "un-African" or "Western"; the promotion of LGBTQ rights is often viewed as a form of neocolonialism, the imposition of outside cultural values upon Africa.

Similarly to neighbouring Kenya, Rwanda and Burundi, male homosexual relations were acknowledged and tolerated in precolonial Ugandan society. Among the Baganda, Uganda's largest ethnic group, homosexuality was usually treated with indifference. The Luganda term abasiyazi refers to homosexuals, though usage nowadays is commonly pejorative. Among the Lango people, mudoko dako individuals were believed to form a "third gender" alongside male and female. The mudoko dako were effeminate men, mostly treated by Langi society as women and could marry other men without social sanctions. Homosexuality was also acknowledged among the Teso, Bahima, Banyoro, and Karamojong peoples. Societal acceptance eroded after the arrival of the British and the creation of the Protectorate of Uganda.

The last reigning Kabaka of Buganda, or king, Mwanga II, was known to have regular sexual relations with men and women: Having had a total of sixteen wives, he also had sex with his male pages, a traditional privilege of his royal position. The degree of the pages' autonomy and ability to give free consent is unclear. This uncertainty is exploited by anti-LGBTQ activists in Uganda – Mwanga is depicted as abusive and predatory. During his reign, Mwanga II increasingly regarded Christian missionaries and the European colonial powers as threats. He espoused an aggressive policy, expelling all missionaries and insisting that Christian and Muslim converts abandon their faith or face death. The ruling led to the execution of Mwanga's Christian pages who refused to leave their adopted religion. One view of Mwanga's action sees it as that of an absolutist ruler's demonstration of his omnipotence and refusal to countenance any dissent, regardless of whether the defiance was of a sexual nature or not; a contrasting view is that depicting Mwanga as an abuser who forced (homo)-sexual acts on his subjects and murdered them for not complying. The specific reasons for the execution of the king's pages – religious and political conflict, or resistance to the ruler's authority – is contested. The advent of colonial rule was accomplished by 1894, nine years after the death of the pages.

== Colonial and post-independence ==
Laws prohibiting same-sex sexual acts were first put in place under British colonial rule. They were retained and expanded following independence. Conservative evangelical Christian missionaries have had significant influence on the passage of anti-LGBTQ legislation in Uganda. In particular, evangelical activist Scott Lively delivered a speech at a 2009 anti-gay seminar in Uganda, and consulted influential Ugandans to affect the introduction of anti-LGBTQ legislation.

== Current laws ==
=== Anti-Homosexuality Act, 2023 ===
In March 2023, Parliament passed the Anti-Homosexuality Act (AHA 2023), which had been introduced earlier the same month by Asuman Basalirwa. The draft law prescribed the death penalty for "aggravated homosexuals" and up to 20 years in prison for "promoters" of homosexuality. On 21 April, President Museveni sent the bill back to Parliament, which passed it again on 2 May with minor amendments by a vote of 348 to 1. Museveni signed it into law on 26 May. The Act, as passed, did not include the earlier proposed provision contained in the bill, that would have criminalised merely identifying as gay or non-binary.

Maximum penalties prescribed under the Act include:

- Life imprisonment for homosexual acts
  - for attempted homosexual acts, imprisonment for 10 years
- Death penalty for "aggravated homosexuality"
  - for attempted "aggravated homosexuality", imprisonment for 14 years

Sex crimes such as the sexual abuse of children or other vulnerable people are included in the definition of aggravated homosexuality (for example, sexual intercourse with a person not consenting or unable to consent, or younger than 18), so conflating these abusive behaviours with homosexuality. Additionally, intercourse with a person older than 75, or a disabled or mentally ill person are also listed as acts of "aggravated homosexuality". A person convicted of homosexuality more than once ("repeat" or "serial offender") or anyone who transmits serious infectious diseases while engaging in same-sex sexual conduct are also defined as "aggravated homosexuals".

People convicted of homosexuality or attempted homosexuality, aggravated homosexuality or attempted aggravated homosexuality cannot be employed in childcare facilities even after release.

Other penalties under the act include:

- Three years imprisonment for minors convicted of homosexuality
- Ten years imprisonment for knowingly renting premises to people who wish to engage in homosexual acts on such a premise
- Twenty years imprisonment for promoting homosexuality
- For "purporting to contract a same-sex marriage", as well as for knowingly attending a purported same-sex marriage ceremony: imprisonment for ten years.
- Failing to report a witnessed homosexual act: imprisonment for five years. Lawyers acting in their official capacity are exempt from this provision.
- For falsely accusing another person of homosexuality: imprisonment for one year

In August 15, 2023, a 20-year-old man became the first person prosecuted for "aggravated homosexuality" under the law, for which he faces the death penalty. He was released on bail on July 30, 2024.

In 2023, the United States removed Uganda from eligibility for its African Growth and Opportunity Act trade program due to "gross violations of internationally recognized human rights", including the Anti-Homosexuality Act.

==== Proposed AHA 2023 version ====
Before the Act was promulgated, there was a draft, the Anti-Homosexuality Bill (Bill no. 3 of 2023), that generated international news coverage. Had it passed intact it would have criminalised merely identifying as gay or non-binary, stipulating that "hold[ing] out as a lesbian, gay, transgender, a queer or any other sexual or gender identity that is contrary to the binary categories of male and female" was committing "an offence of homosexuality" and thus liable to the penalty of ten years in prison. This provision, 2(1)(d), was excluded from the Act that was passed and signed into law.

=== Prohibition of same-sex marriage ===
On 29 September 2005, President Yoweri Museveni signed a constitutional amendment prohibiting same-sex marriage. Clause 2a of Section 31 states: "Marriage between persons of the same sex is prohibited."

== Superseded laws ==
=== Penal Code Act 1950 ===
The Penal Code Act 1950 contains provisions banning homosexual intercourse. The following sections of that Act are relevant:

Section 145. Unnatural offences. Any person who—

(a) has carnal knowledge of any person against the order of nature; [or]

(b) has carnal knowledge of an animal; or

(c) permits a male person to have carnal knowledge of him or her against the order of nature, commits an offence and is liable to imprisonment for life.

Section 146. Attempt to commit unnatural offences. Any person who attempts to commit any of the offences specified in section 145 commits a felony and is liable to imprisonment for seven years.

Section 148. Indecent practices. Any person who, whether in public or in private, commits any act of gross indecency with another person or procures another person to commit any act of gross indecency with him or her or attempts to procure the commission of any such act by any person with himself or herself or with another person, whether in public or in private, commits an offence and is liable to imprisonment for seven years.

Before the Penal Code Amendment (Gender References) Act 2000 was enacted, only same-sex acts between men were criminalised. In 2000, that Act was passed and changed references to "any male" to "any person" so that grossly indecent acts between women were criminalised as well, and are now punishable by up to seven years imprisonment. The Act also extended this criminalising such acts to both homosexuals and heterosexuals, effectively outlawing oral sex and anal sex for everybody, regardless of sexual orientation.

=== 2014 Anti-Homosexuality Act ===
On 13 October 2009, Member of Parliament David Bahati introduced the Anti-Homosexuality Act (AHA 2014), which would broaden the criminalization of same-sex relationships in Uganda and introduce the death penalty for serial offenders, HIV-positive people who engage in sexual activity with people of the same sex, and persons who engage in same-sex sexual acts with people under 18 years of age. Individuals or companies that promote LGBTQ rights would be fined or imprisoned, or both. Persons "in authority" would be required to report any offence under the Act within 24 hours or face up to three years' imprisonment.

In November 2012, Parliament Speaker Rebecca Kadaga promised to pass a revised anti-homosexuality law in December 2012. "Ugandans want that law as a Christmas gift. They have asked for it, and we'll give them that gift." The Parliament, however, adjourned in December 2012 without acting on the bill. The bill passed on 17 December 2013 with a punishment of life in prison instead of the death penalty for "aggravated homosexuality", and the new law was promulgated in February 2014.

In June 2014, in response to the passing of AHA 2014, the United States Department of State announced several sanctions, including, cuts to funding, blocking certain Ugandan officials from entering the country, cancelling aviation exercises in Uganda and supporting Ugandan LGBTQ NGOs.

In August 2014, the Constitutional Court of Uganda annulled this Act, ruling that it had been passed without the required quorum for the parliamentary vote.

=== Sexual Offences Bill, 2019 ===
In May 2021, the outgoing parliament passed the Sexual Offences Bill, further criminalizing sex work and gay sex in the final days of its last session. The incoming government indicated that it would not grant assent to the bill, meaning that it would not become law. On 29 July 2021, petitions by gay and human rights activists arose to President Museveni not to sign another bill into law which would further criminalise gay sex, stating that it could increase violent attacks even to people suspected of being gay. In August 2021, President Museveni confirmed that he would not sign the bill into law at this time, suggesting much of its content is already covered by existing legislation and sending it back to Parliament to address these redundancies. Museveni reportedly also had concerns about foreign policy implications and democratic buy-in and felt it was not politically advantageous to sign it as he had already recently won re-election.

== Constitutional provisions ==
Article 21 of the Ugandan Constitution, "Equality and freedom from discrimination", guarantees protection against discriminatory legislation for all citizens.

On 22 December 2008, the High Court of Uganda ruled that Articles 23, 24, and 27 of the Uganda Constitution apply to all people, regardless of their sexual orientation or gender identity or expression. Article 23 states that "No person shall be deprived of personal liberty." Article 24 states that "No person shall be subjected to any form of torture, cruel, inhuman or degrading treatment or punishment." Article 27 states that "No person shall be subjected to: (a) unlawful search of the person, home or other property of that person; or (b) unlawful entry by others of the premises of that person or property. No person shall be subjected to interference with the privacy of that person's home, correspondence, communication or other property."

In November 2016, the Constitutional Court of Uganda ruled that a provision in the Equal Opportunities Commission Act was unconstitutional. This provision effectively barred the commission from investigating "any matter involving behaviour which is considered to be immoral and socially harmful, or unacceptable by the majority of the cultural and social communities in Uganda." The court ruled that the section breaches the right to a fair hearing and as well as the rights of minorities, as guaranteed in the Constitution. The court also ruled that Uganda's Parliament cannot create a class of "social misfits who are referred to as immoral, harmful and unacceptable" and cannot legislate the discrimination of such persons.

Following the ruling, Maria Burnett, Human Rights Watch Associate Director for East Africa, said: "Because of their work, all Ugandans should now be able to bring cases of discrimination – against their employers who fired or harassed them, or landlords who kicked them out of their homes – and finally receive a fair hearing before the commission."

== Living conditions ==
The climate in Uganda is hostile to homosexuals; many political leaders have used openly anti-gay rhetoric, and have said that homosexuality is "akin to bestiality", was "brought to Uganda by white people" and is "un-African". Simon Lokodo, Minister for Ethics and Integrity, is known by Ugandan LGBTQ activists as "the country's main homophobe", has suggested that rape is more morally acceptable than consensual sex between people of the same sex, has accompanied violent police raids on LGBT events and actively suppresses freedom of speech and of assembly for LGBTQ people.

In 2005, Human Rights Watch reported on Uganda's abstinence until marriage programs. "By definition ... [they] discriminate on the basis of sexual orientation. For young people who are lesbian, gay, bisexual, or transgender ... and cannot legally marry in Uganda, ... these messages imply, wrongly, that there is no safe way for them to have sex. They deny these people information that could save their lives. They also convey a message about the intrinsic wrongfulness of homosexual conduct that reinforces existing social stigma and prejudice to potentially devastating effect."

The U.S. Department of State's 2011 human rights report concluded that LGBTQ persons faced discrimination, harassment and legal restrictions, citing a number of incidents. (Note: The US Department of State's 2011 human rights report states: LGBT persons faced discrimination and legal restrictions. It is illegal to engage in homosexual acts ... While no persons were convicted under the law [in 2011], the government arrested persons for related offenses. For example, in July police arrested an individual for "attempting" to engage in homosexual activities. On July 15, [2011] a court in Entebbe charged him with "indecent practices" and released him on bail. Hearing of the case was pending at year's end. LGBT persons were subject to societal harassment, discrimination, intimidation, and threats to their well-being [in 2011] and were denied access to health services. Discriminatory practices also prevented local LBGT NGOs from registering with the NGO Board and obtaining official NGO status. ... On January 26, [2011] LGBT activist David Kato, who had successfully sued the local tabloid discussed above for the 2010 publication of his picture under the headline "Hang Them," was bludgeoned to death at his home outside Kampala. On February 2, police arrested Sidney Enock Nsubuga for Kato's murder. On November 9, Nsubuga pled guilty and was sentenced to 30 years' imprisonment. On October 3, [2011] the Constitutional Court heard oral arguments on a 2009 petition filed by a local human rights and LGBT activists challenging the constitutionality of Section 15(6)(d) of the Equal Opportunities Commission Act. Section 15(6)(d) prevents the Equal Opportunities Commission from investigating "any matter involving behavior which is considered to be (i) immoral and socially harmful, or (ii) unacceptable by the majority of the cultural and social communities in Uganda." The petitioner argued that this clause is discriminatory and violates the constitutional rights of minority populations. A decision was pending at year's end.)

A 2018 article in African Health Sciences said that Uganda's high HIV rate has "roots" in Uganda's stigma against same-sex sexual behavior and sex work. In 2004, the Uganda Broadcasting Council fined Radio Simba over $1,000 and forced it to issue a public apology after hosting homosexuals on a live talk show. The council's chairman, Godfrey Mutabazi, said the programme "is contrary to public morality and is not in compliance with the existing law". Information Minister Nsaba Buturo said the measure reflected Ugandans' wish to uphold "God's moral values" and "We are not going to give them the opportunity to recruit others."

=== Freedom of speech ===
In June 2012, the Ugandan Government announced the ban of 38 non-governmental organizations (NGO) it accused of "promoting homosexuality" and "undermining the national culture". Simon Lokodo, the country's Minister of Ethics and Integrity, claimed the NGOs were "receiving support from abroad for Uganda's homosexuals and "recruiting" young children into homosexuality." He also said that "they are encouraging homosexuality as if it is the best form of sexual behaviour". That same month, Lokodo ordered Ugandan police to break-up an LGBTQ rights workshop in Kampala. Later in the month, the Ugandan Government, in an apparent rebuke of Lokodo, announced that it will no longer attempt to break up meetings of LGBT rights groups.

=== Recognition of transgender identity ===
In October 2021, trans woman Cleopatra Kambugu Kentaro was issued new ID identifying her as female. She is the first Ugandan to have a change of gender legally recognised.

=== Violence and harassment ===
Vigilante attacks, including harassment, beatings and murder occur. Both state and non-state actors are involved in targeting those perceived as LGBT. However, the United States Department of State considers that mob violence is prevalent in many circumstances in Uganda. (Note: The US Department of State's 2021 Country Human Rights Report: Uganda, states: Mob violence was prevalent. Communities often resorted to mob violence due to a lack of confidence in police and the judiciary to deliver justice. They attacked and killed persons suspected of robbery, homicide, rape, theft, ritual sacrifice, and witchcraft, among other crimes. Mobs often beat, lynched, burned, and otherwise brutalized their victims. On August 30, local media reported that a mob in Fort Portal Town killed a man by cutting off his head after they found him with a stolen chicken. Police stated they would investigate the killing but did not reveal any findings by year's end.) It is directed at a range of socially disapproved individuals for actual or perceived wrongdoing, due, in the view of the State Department's report, to the community's lack of confidence in the police and judiciary. Extrajudicial police actions against LGBTQ individuals, such as arbitrary detention, beatings and psychological coercion, meet the United Nations criteria for torture.

In June 2021, a raid on the Happy Family Youth Shelter in Kampala resulted in forty-four arrests. Police claimed that an illegal same-sex wedding was being held and that the participants were "doing a negligent act likely to spread infection of disease." Several of the detainees then alleged that police performed invasive anal examinations on them. Thirty-nine of the 44 were released on bail after several days in detention, with the trial scheduled for 8 July.

In October 2019, 28-year-old Ugandan LGBT activist Brian Wasswa was beaten to death in his own home.

In August 2016, an LGBT event was brutally interrupted by police officers who violently attacked and beat the people present at the event, eventually arresting sixteen. In August 2017, the organisers of Pride Uganda had to cancel the event after threats of arrest by the police and the government.

=== Media 'outing' ===
In August 2006, a Ugandan newspaper, The Red Pepper, published a list of the first names and professions (or areas of work) of forty-five allegedly gay men.

In October 2010, the tabloid paper Rolling Stone published the full names, addresses, photographs, and preferred social-hangouts of 100 allegedly gay and lesbian Ugandans, accompanied by a call for their execution. David Kato, Kasha Jacqueline, and Pepe Julian Onziema, all members of the Civil Society Coalition On Human Rights and Constitutional Law, filed suit against the tabloid. A High Court judge in January 2011 issued a permanent injunction preventing Rolling Stone and its managing editor Giles Muhame from "any further publications of the identities of the persons and homes of the applicants and homosexuals generally".

The court further awarded USh 1,500,000/= plus court costs to each of the plaintiffs. The judge ruled that the outing, and the accompanying incitement to violence, threatened the subjects' fundamental rights and freedoms, attacked their right to human dignity, and violated their constitutional right to privacy. Kato was murdered in 2011, shortly after winning the lawsuit.

== LGBTQ rights activism ==
Uganda's main LGBTQ rights organization is Sexual Minorities Uganda (SMUG), founded in 2004 by Victor Mukasa. Frank Mugisha is the executive director and the winner of both the 2011 Robert F. Kennedy Human Rights Award and the 2011 Rafto Prize for his work on behalf of LGBTQ rights in Uganda. Its early years were relatively free from government interference, however its 2012 application for official registration was rejected by the Uganda Registration Services Bureau, the body which oversees non-government organisations (NGOs). The bureau's 2016 decision was challenged but was upheld by the High Court in 2018. The court's decision confirmed the bureau's legal right to withhold registration from SMUG as an organisation whose objectives "are in contravention of the laws of Uganda." While NGOs barred from registration could operate on an informal basis as "associations", they are restricted from opening bank accounts or seeking funding from donations. In 2019, the government revoked the permission to operate of more than twelve thousand NGOs. In August 2022, SMUG was ordered by the Uganda's NGO bureau to cease its operations altogether.

In late 2014, LGBTQ Ugandans published the first issue of Bombastic magazine and launched the online platform Kuchu Times. These actions have been dubbed as a "Reclaiming the Media Campaign" by distinguished activist Kasha Jacqueline Nabagesera. She was awarded the Martin Ennals Award for Human Rights Defenders in 2011.

Former Prime Minister Amama Mbabazi is the first Ugandan presidential candidate to openly oppose homophobia. He ran in the 2016 presidential election and came third.

In November 2017, several police officers from the Kampala Metropolitan Police Area were ordered by police headquarters to attend a workshop on LGBTQ rights. A police spokesperson said: "What the training is aimed at, is to teach our field officers to appreciate that minorities have rights that should be respected."

The term kuchu, of Swahili origin, is increasingly used by the Ugandan LGBTQ community. A documentary film, Call Me Kuchu, was released in 2012, focusing in part on the 2011 murder of LGBT activist David Kato. Kato's murder also inspired German-Dutch writer Lutz van Dijk to write the short novel Kampala – Hamburg: Roman einer Flucht.

== Public opinion ==
A 2007 Pew Global Attitudes Project poll found that 96 percent of Ugandan residents believed that homosexuality is a way of life that society should not accept, which was the fifth-highest rate of non-acceptance in the 45 countries surveyed. A poll conducted in 2010, however, revealed that 11 percent of Ugandans viewed homosexual behavior as being morally acceptable. Among other members of the East African Community, only one percent in Tanzania, four percent in Rwanda, and one percent in Kenya had the same view.

A 2013 Pew Research Center opinion survey showed that 96 percent of Ugandans believed homosexuality should not be accepted by society, while four percent believed it should. Older people were more accepting than younger people: three percent of people between 18 and 29 believed it should be accepted, two percent of people between 30 and 49 and seven percent of people over 50.

In May 2015, PlanetRomeo, an LGBT social network, published its first Gay Happiness Index (GHI). Gay men from over 120 countries were asked about how they feel about society's view on homosexuality, how do they experience the way they are treated by other people and how satisfied are they with their lives. Uganda was ranked last with a GHI score of 20.

A poll carried out by ILGA found attitudes towards LGBTQ people had significantly changed by 2017: Fifty-nine percent of Ugandans agreed that gay, lesbian and bisexual people should enjoy the same rights as straight people, while 41 percent disagreed. Additionally, 56 percent agreed that they should be protected from workplace discrimination. Fifty-four percent of Ugandans, however, said that people who are in same-sex relationships should be charged as criminals, while 34% disagreed. As for transgender people, 60 percent agreed that they should have the same rights, 62 percent believed they should be protected from employment discrimination and 53 percent believed they should be allowed to change their legal gender. Additionally, according to that same poll, a third of Ugandans would try to "change" a neighbour's sexual orientation if they discovered they were gay.

== Summary table ==
Same-sex sexual activity legal	No / (Penalty: Capital punishment for "aggravated homosexuality")
Equal age of consent	No
Anti-discrimination laws in employment only	No
Anti-discrimination laws in the provision of goods and services	No
Anti-discrimination laws in all other areas (Incl. indirect discrimination, hate speech)	No / Yes Limited protections.
Same-sex marriages	No (Constitutional ban since 2005)
Recognition of same-sex couples	No
Stepchild adoption by same-sex couples	No
Joint adoption by same-sex couples	No
LGBTQ people allowed to serve openly in the military	No
Right to change legal gender	No
Access to IVF for lesbians	No
Homosexuality and transgenderism being declassified as mental illness	No
Conversion practices made illegal	No Legally unrestricted
LGBTQ propaganda laws removed allowing freedom of expression	No
Commercial surrogacy for gay male couples	No
MSMs allowed to donate blood	No

== See also ==
- Human rights in Uganda
- Intersex rights in Uganda
- LGBTQ rights in Africa
- Capital punishment for homosexuality

== Sources ==
- Ramón Mendos, Lucas; Botha, Kellyn; Carrano Lelis, Rafael; López de la Peña, Enrique; Savelev, Ilia; Tan, Daron (14 December 2020). State-Sponsored Homophobia report: 2020 global legislation overview update (PDF) (Report) (14th revised ed.). Geneva: ILGA World. Archived from the original (PDF) on 15 December 2020.
- "Bill No. 3 – The Anti-Homosexuality Bill 2023" (PDF), The Uganda Gazette: Bills Supplement, vol. CXVI, no. 16, Government of Uganda, p. 5, 3 March 2023
- "Part II: Homosexuality and Related Practices; Section 2. The offence of homosexuality". The Anti-homosexuality Act, 2023 (PDF). Republic of Uganda. 25 May 2023.
- Rao, Rahul (2020). Out of time: The queer politics of postcoloniality. New York: Oxford University Press. ISBN 978-0-19-086552-8.
  Chapters:
  - "Introduction: The queer politics of postcoloniality". pp. 1–32
