= Freedom & Roam Uganda =

Freedom and Roar Uganda
- Formation: 4 July 2003
- Headquarters: Kampala, Uganda
- FOUNDERS: Kasher Jacqueline Nabagesera, Victor Mukasa and Taz Musisi
- Website: |https://faruganda.org

Freedom and Roam Uganda (FARUG) is a human rights organization that addresses discrimination against lesbian, bisexual, transgender and intersex (LBTIQ) people in Uganda.

FARUG was founded in 2003 by Kasha Jacqueline Nabagesera, a Ugandan lesbian advocate. The group’s current executive director is Ssenfuka J Warry.

After witnessing and experiencing the harassment, discrimination and violence Ugandan women face because of their gender identity or sexual orientation, Nabagesera set out with a group of her friends to advocate on their behalf.

Today FARUG identifies as the only local organization fully dedicated to LBTI issues in Uganda.

FARUG’s work includes raising awareness throughout the country about LBTI women, sexual and reproductive health, homophobia, and transphobia; increasing visibility in the media; lobbying locally, regionally and internationally; conducting skills and knowledge-sharing workshops, seminars and conferences; and challenging what the group sees as anti-LBTI beliefs and stigma on a day-to-day basis .

FARUG has also worked closely with Sexual Minorities Uganda (SMUG), an umbrella LGBT (Lesbian, Gay, Bisexual and Transgender) advocacy organization, to highlight discrimination against lesbian, gay, bisexual and transgender Ugandans.

In response to an article in the Ugandan newspaper Rolling Stone that published photographs of gay and lesbian Ugandans under the headline "Hang Them,” Nabagesera and other members of SMUG whose faces appeared in the paper filed a petition to the High Court seeking to end circulation of the article. The petition was granted on November 2, 2010, effectively ruling for the end of the publication.

In May 2011, FARUG’s executive director Kasha Jacqueline Nabagesera was awarded the Martin Ennals Award for Human Rights Defenders for her advocacy.
