= Victor Mukasa =

- Born: Uganda
- Education: Uganda Institute of Bankers
- Occupation: Human rights activist
- Years active: 2000s–present
- Organization(s): Sexual Minorities Uganda (SMUG), Kuchu Diaspora Alliance-USA, Freedom and Roam Uganda, East and Horn of Africa Human Rights Defenders Project
- Known for: Activism for sexual minority rights in Uganda
- Notable work: Advocacy for LGBT rights in Uganda; legal challenge on unlawful arrest and detention (2005 case)
- Title: Former Chairperson of SMUG; Executive Director at Kuchu Diaspora Alliance-USA
- Movement: LGBT rights movement

Victor Mukasa is a Ugandan human rights activist and former chairman of the Sexual Minorities Uganda (SMUG). Mukasa identifies as a trans-lesbian and is currently an executive director at Kuchu Diaspora Alliance-USA.

== Life ==
Mukasa was assigned female at birth and raised in a conservative Catholic family. Growing up, he preferred dressing like a tomboy. Gradually, his mother became accommodating to his style of dressing but his father thought of him as stubborn and sometimes punished for his behavior.

He studied at boarding schools and attended the Uganda Institute of Bankers.

Uganda was hostile to the LGBT community and Mukasa initially felt he had to follow the mainstream norm, he attended churches but ended discouraged when one performed a form of exorcism on him. He soon began to express himself but faced discrimination as a result. Mukasa became active in the LGBT movement in East Africa, he co-founded SMUG and helped launch other groups including Freedom and Roam Uganda and East and Horn of Africa Human Rights Defenders Project.

In 2005, local police raided Victor's home without a search warrant and confiscated LGBT related documents. Victor and a fellow activist, Yvonne Oyoo were arrested and detained by the police. At the time of the raid, the mainstream press in Uganda, the government and many AIDS activists articulated homophobic viewpoints. After his release, he fled to South Africa for a brief period. In 2007, he returned to Uganda and held a press conference on LGBT rights supported by individuals who covered their faces with masks. Victor unexpectedly filed an 'Application for enforcement of rights guaranteed in the Bill of Rights' challenging his and Yvonne's detention and police abuse. In December 2008, a judgement from the High Court decided that Uganda's human rights laws extends to all citizens including the LGBT community.

He went on exile to South Africa where he worked as a program associate at the Cape town office of International Gay and Lesbian Human Rights Commission.

In June 2009, Victor Mukasa was named international grand marshal of Toronto's Pride. In 2013 he gained asylum in the United States of America.
