= Pepe Julian Onziema =

Ugandan human rights activist (born 1980)

- Onziema in 2026
- Born: 30 November 1980 (age 45); West Nile, Uganda
- Occupations: Gay rights activist; program director of Sexual Minorities Uganda

Pepe Julian Onziema (born 30 November 1980) is a Ugandan LGBT rights and human rights activist. He began his human rights work in 2004. A trans man, he has participated in organizing LGBT pride celebrations in Uganda.

Onziema is the Director of Programs at Sexual Minorities Uganda (SMUG), an LGBTI advocacy organization. SMUG provides research, documentation, and evidence to advocate for policy change in Uganda. He also provides LGBT+ members with safety and protection from discriminatory hate crimes.

As of 2019, Onziema has been arrested or detained seven times, incurring violence in which he lost hearing in his left ear and needed to be hospitalized.

== Personal life ==
Onziema was assigned female at birth. He first questioned his gender by the age of 6, and this increased at the age of 9. By puberty, he expressed himself in ways that "affirmed [him] as a male person." Although he could have transitioned elsewhere, he chose to stay in Uganda and transition there to affect the country's culture. He came out in the 1990s, and his mother was supportive throughout his life, including of his advocacy work.

As of 2020, he has found acceptance throughout his community, attending village elder meetings and being embraced as "the son [he] truly [is]."

== Morning Breeze interview ==
On 18 December 2012, he appeared on the NBS Television programme Morning Breeze for a debate over sexual minorities and their situation in Uganda. Presenter Simon Kaggwa Njala opened with the question, "Why are you gay?", which along with the rest of the interview became the subject of various internet memes.

The interview developed into a heated dispute when pastor and anti-gay activist Martin Ssempa appeared on the same episode to discredit Onziema. Ssempa misgendered Onziema, and using fruits and vegetables, demonstrated various sexual acts he described as "sodomy" while shouting over Njala in both English and Luganda.

== Advocacy ==
In 2014, Onziema denounced a local tabloid list of "200 Top Homo" Ugandans, many of whom did not identify as gay. The article was released just one day after President Yoweri Museveni enacted the Anti-Homosexuality Act, 2014 that included life imprisonment. Onziema criticized the piece for directly inciting hate crimes against members of the LGBT community including violence and murder. One victim was David Kato, his coworker in Sexual Minorities Uganda, who had been murdered following his publication in an article titled "Hang Them."

That year, Onziema "led a successful challenge of Uganda's infamous law that made homosexuality a crime punishable by death." He united 55 Ugandan civil society organizations including parents, educators, and caregivers to "form a coalition to fight the law." CBC Radio reported, "Six months after the bill was passed, Onziema's coalition scored a court victory, striking the law down on a technicality." That year, UK-based charity Stonewall named Onziema Hero of the Year.

== Awards and other media appearances ==
In 2012, he was named a Global Citizen by the Clinton Global Initiative for his work in human rights advocacy.

In 2013, Pepe was shortlisted for the David Kato Vision and Voice Award, an award in honour of his murdered friend and fellow advocacy officer for Sexual Minorities Uganda, David Kato.

In 2014, he was interviewed by John Oliver on the American television series Last Week Tonight about the human rights situation for LGBT people in Uganda. Initially, Onziema was "very skeptical" and refused to appear on the show, feeling "done with media." However, Oliver made Onziema feel very comfortable and respected, particularly Oliver introducing Onziema as a trans man. The episode positively affected Onziema's reputation in Uganda, causing him to receive increased support at home.

In 2016, Onziema was one of multiple activists arrested at Uganda's fifth gay pride event in Kampala. Onziema was taken into police custody and other inmates were ordered to beat him so severely he required hospitalization, losing hearing in his left ear. The Uganda Police Force claimed no one was injured, while Onziema countered they are not listening to members of the community who remained as survivors or victims. He claims the police not only inflict physical violence on members of the LGBT community, but also psychological trauma.

At Uganda Pride 2022, Onziema said when asked how the week's events fit into the global struggle for LGBT equality:

Uganda has been named as one of the worst places to be gay, which means that all eyes are on Uganda. For us to celebrate our visibility [amidst all the hostility] is very important.

Despite the hardships he faced in Ugandan prisons, Onziema stated:

I love this country to bits, and my work is to make it the kind of place that it really is. It's beautiful. It has beautiful people, and I'm just doing my ounce of something to preserve it for people who will come after me.

== See also ==
- LGBT rights in Uganda
- Stella Nyanzi
