= James Nsaba Buturo =

Ugandan politician (born 1951)

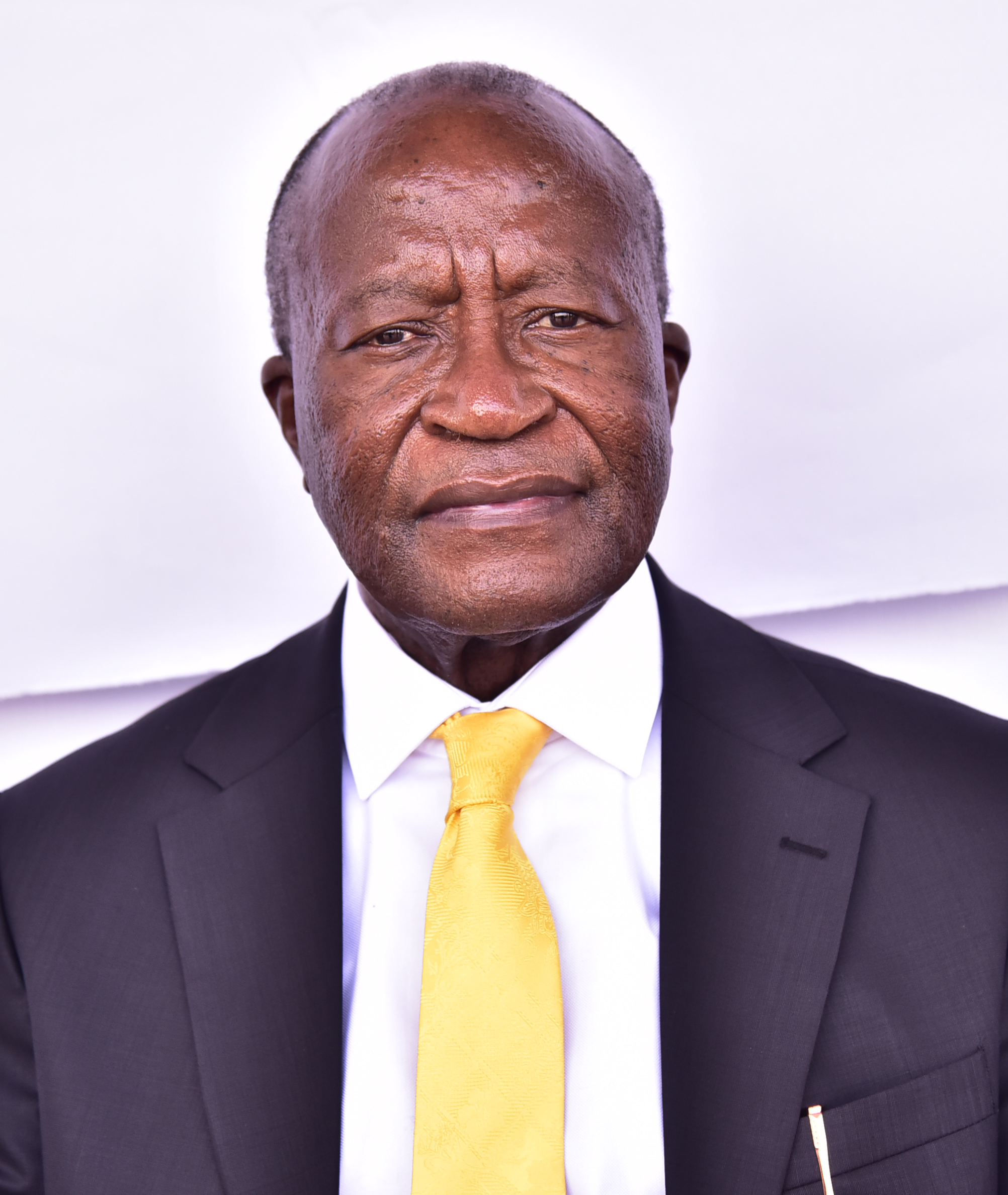
- Born: 18 March 1951 (age 75); Uganda
- Citizenship: Uganda
- Education: Makerere University (BA in Political Science & Public Administration); University of Birmingham (MA in Developmental Administration (PhD in Developmental Administration)
- Occupation: Politician
- Years active: 2006–present
- Known for: Politics
- Spouse: Ms Edith Buturo (m 1995)

James Nsaba Buturo (born 18 March 1951) is a Ugandan politician. He was the minister of state for ethics and integrity in the Office of the Vice President in the Cabinet of Uganda from 1st June 2006 [1] until his resignation on 15th March 2011. In the cabinet reshuffle of 27 May 2011, his docket was assigned to Father Simon Lokodo. He also served as the elected Member of Parliament representing "Bufumbira County East", Kisoro District, from 2001 until 2011. In the 2011 national elections, Nsaba Buturo lost in the primaries to Wagahugu Kwizera of the National Resistance Movement political party, who represented the constituency in the 9th parliament (2011-2016). Nsaba Buturo insisted on contesting the general elections as an independent candidate, but he still lost. He represented the Bufumbira East County in the 10th parliament of Uganda (2016-2021) under the National Resistance Movement (NRM). James Nsaba Buturo came back in parliament to represent Bufumbira County East in the 11th parliament in the term 2021-2026 unnder the National Resistance Movement (NRM).

He did not contest the January 2026 general elections after losing the NRM primaries and withdrawing his independent bid. The seat was won by the NRM's Roland Kanya Nkurumah, who represents Bufumbira East County in the 12th parliament (2026-2031).

== Early life and education ==
James Nsaba Buturo was born in Kisoro District, on 18 March 1951. He holds a Bachelor of Arts in political science and public administration from Makerere University, Uganda's oldest institution of tertiary education, founded in 1922. He also holds a postgraduate diploma in developmental administration, also from Makerere. He completed the Master of Arts in Developmental Administration from the University of Birmingham in the United Kingdom. He then earned his degree of Doctor of Philosophy in the same field, also at Birmingham.

== Career ==
From 1977 until 1986, he served as a District Commissioner in the Ministry of Local Government. He then emigrated to the United Kingdom, where he served as a Development Manager, from 1989 to 1995. In 1999 he returned to Uganda and was appointed Director of Planning & Monitoring for Uganda AIDS Commission, serving in that capacity until 2001.

In 2001, he entered politics and was elected to the Ugandan Parliament, to represent "Bufumbira County East", Kisoro District. He was re-elected in 2006. From 2001 to 2006, he served as theostate minister for information Broadcastin.

He was retained as state minister for information in the cabinet reshuffle of 13 January 2005. In another cabinet reshuffle in June 2006, he was appointed State Minister for Ethics in the Office of the Vice President. In March 2011, he lost his parliamentary seat and resigned from the cabinet.

== Personal information ==
James Nsaba Buturo is married Edith Buturo. He belongs to the National Resistance Movement(NRM ) political party.

== See also ==
- Parliament of Uganda
- Cabinet of Uganda
- Kisoro District
- Directorate of Ethics and Integrity
- Uganda AIDS Commission
