= Rolling Stone (Uganda) =

Weekly tabloid newspaper published in Kampala, Uganda

- First page of the October 2-9, 2010 issue
- Type: Weekly
- Format: Tabloid
- Managing editor: Giles Muhame
- Founded: 23 August 2010
- Ceased publication: November 2010
- Language: English
- Headquarters: Kampala, Uganda
- Circulation: 2000

Rolling Stone was a weekly tabloid newspaper published in Kampala, Uganda. The paper published its first issue on 23 August 2010, under the direction of 22-year-old Giles Muhame and two classmates from Kampala's Makerere University. According to Muhame, the paper's title was derived from the local word enkurungu: "It's a metaphor for something that strikes with lightning speed, that can kill someone if it is thrown at them." The paper was small, with a circulation of approximately 2000 copies. It suspended publication in November 2010 after the High Court ruled that it had violated the fundamental rights of LGBTQ Ugandans by attempting to out them and calling for their deaths. One of those listed, David Kato, was subsequently murdered.

The paper was unaffiliated with the American magazine Rolling Stone, which later described the Ugandan paper's actions as "horrific" and protested its choice of name.

== Reporting on homosexuality ==
On 9 October 2010, the newspaper published a front-page article – titled "100 Pictures of Uganda's Top Homos Leak" – that listed the names, photographs and addresses of 100 gay people alongside a yellow banner that read "Hang Them". The two men displayed on the front cover picture were gay rights activists David Kato and Christopher Senyonjo.

The paper also alleged that gay people aimed to "recruit" Ugandan children. This publication attracted international attention and criticism from human rights organizations, such as Amnesty International, No Peace Without Justice and the International Lesbian, Gay, Bisexual, Trans and Intersex Association. According to gay rights activists, many Ugandans have been attacked since the publication as a result of their real or perceived sexual orientation. One woman was reportedly almost killed when her neighbors began to stone her house.

In a subsequent issue, Rolling Stone alleged a connection between the Somali terrorist group al-Shabaab and gay Ugandans under the headline "Homo Generals Plotted Kampala Terror Attacks", charging "a gay lobby" with complicity in the July 2010 Kampala suicide bombings.

== Court case ==
Following a second published edition listing the identities and addresses of people alleged to be homosexual, the gay rights organization Sexual Minorities Uganda petitioned the Ugandan High Court against the newspaper. On 2 November 2010, the court issued its verdict, ordering the newspaper to stop publishing the identities of Ugandan gays, to shut down and to pay USh 1.5 million plus court costs to each of the plaintiffs. The ruling said that these lists and the accompanying incitement to violence threatened the subjects' "fundamental rights and freedoms", attacked their right to human dignity and violated their constitutional right to privacy.

Immediately following the verdict, Muhame told reporters, "The war against gays will and must continue. We have to protect our children from this dirty homosexual affront." In January 2011, he announced the paper's intention to appeal the decision. He said that the paper was also gathering signatures of support from Ugandans.

The American magazine Rolling Stone called the newspaper's actions "horrific" and stated that it had "demanded they [the Ugandan newspaper] cease using our name as a title". However, the magazine had little legal recourse because, despite copyrighting the name "Rolling Stone" in a large number of countries, it had not copyrighted it in Uganda. As its publisher, Jann Wenner, said, "There's nothing we can do. We never copyrighted the name in Uganda. We own the copyright for the name in many, many countries. But who would have thought we'd have to own the copyright in Uganda?"

The International Press Institute sent a letter to Muhame condemning his actions after his paper was shut down by the country's Constitutional Court. "IPI believes that when newspapers publish articles that expose private information about individuals who are outside the public eye, and when they call for violence against those individuals, they do a disservice to journalists around the world who are fighting for press freedom... Such transgressions of professional journalistic ethics make all journalists look bad – and make it harder to argue for press freedom without government restriction."

== Kato murder ==
Sexual Minorities Uganda leader David Kato, one of the activists outed in the article and a co-plaintiff in the lawsuit, was murdered in his home by an intruder who struck him twice on the head with a hammer. The American magazine Rolling Stone, The New York Times and other news sources suggested that the murder was linked to Kato's high-profile outing in the Ugandan newspaper Rolling Stone, and Human Rights Watch and Amnesty International both called for an investigation into the case and protection for other gay activists.

Muhame condemned the murder and expressed his sympathies for Kato's family, but added that he believed that the paper was not responsible and that the murder was a simple robbery. He said, "I have no regrets about the story. We were just exposing people who were doing wrong." Muhame told the Ugandan newspaper Daily Monitor that Kato "brought death upon himself. He hasn't lived carefully. Kato was a shame to this country". To CNN, he said, "When we called for hanging of gay people, we meant... after they have gone through the legal process... I did not call for them to be killed in cold blood like he was."

== In popular culture ==
The newspaper was the subject of a play of the same title by British playwright Chris Urch, which premiered in Manchester in 2015 and was produced in New York City off-Broadway in 2019.

== See also ==
- LGBTQ rights in Uganda
- Red Pepper (newspaper)
