= Sexual Minorities Uganda =

Banned Ugandan LGBT advocacy group

- Successor: SMUG International- USA (de facto since 2022)
- Formation: 2004
- Dissolved: 2022
- Legal status: Banned
- Executive Director: Frank Mugisha
- Board of directors: Pepe Julian Onziema
- Website: https://smuginternational.org/

Sexual Minorities Uganda (SMUG) was an umbrella non-governmental organization based in Kampala, Uganda. It was described as the country's leading gay rights advocacy group. The group has been banned since 2022. Although the organisation has been outlawed in Uganda, an offshore of it in the United States is still operating as of 2026.

One of their achievements include director Pepe Julian Onziema leading a coalition of 55 civil society organizations to overturn the Anti-Homosexuality Act of 2014.

== Organization ==
Founders included Victor Mukasa and Sylvia Tamale. Executive director Frank Mugisha and deputy director Pepe Julian Onziema both took office in 2007. Advocacy officer David Kato was the advocacy and litigation officer until his murder in January 2011. SMUG advocates for the protection and promotion of human rights of lesbian, gay, bisexual, and transgender (LGBT) Ugandans.

The network was founded in 2004 by several member organizations:

- Icebreakers Uganda, concerned with LGBT research and youth issues.
- Freedom & Roam Uganda, dedicated to the rights of lesbian, transgender, and intersex women.
- Spectrum Uganda, focused on the health and well-being of LGBT people in Uganda (co-founded by John "Longjones" Abdallah Wambere).
- Transgender Initiative Uganda, addressing transgender issues.

== History ==
Victor Mukasa, a trans man activist, founded Sexual Minorities Uganda on 3 March 2004 in Kampala at the Kaival restaurant and Internet cafe. The earliest members included Val Kalende. Kamuhangire.E and David Kato, who were among the first board members. Members of SMUG achieved controversy through their activism and legal troubles for much of the organization's history, and the profile of the organization in the later-2000s due to the rise of homophobic populism in the country and the introduction of the Uganda Anti-Homosexuality Bill in the Parliament by David Bahati.

The Ugandan newspaper Rolling Stone, a publication unrelated to the American magazine of the same name, which rejected the Ugandan paper and called its actions as "horrific", published a gallery of "100 Pictures of Uganda's Top Homos Leak" and stated "Hang Them". In response, four members of SMUG whose faces appeared in the magazine, David Kato Kisule, Kasha Nabagesera, Nabirye Mariam, and Pepe Julian Onziema "Patience", filed a petition with the High Court seeking to force the paper to cease distribution of the article. The court granted the petition on 2 November 2010, effectively ending the publication of Ugandan Rolling Stone.

On 26 January 2011, Kato, whose picture had been featured on the cover of the issue of Rolling Stone in question, was murdered in his home in Mukono Town by his acquaintance Sidney Nsubuga Enoch, 22, who hit him twice in the head with a hammer found in Kato's bathroom before fleeing on foot. The apparent motive was a disagreement about sexual services and robbery. Kato died en route to the Kawolo Hospital. Enoch was subsequently sentenced to 30 years in prison. The murder was decried by Human Rights Watch and senior Africa researcher Maria Burnett said that "David Kato's death is a tragic loss to the human rights community".

On 15 September 2011, SMUG's executive director Frank Mugisha was named the recipient of the annual Robert F. Kennedy Human Rights Award for his activism. Mugisha also received the Rafto Prize for Human Rights on behalf of SMUG on 6 September 2011.

In 2012, SMUG and several Ugandans, including Onziema, Mukasa, and Mugisha, together with the Center for Constitutional Rights initiated legal action in U.S. Federal District Court using the Alien Tort Statute to sue American evangelist Scott Lively for crimes against humanity for his work on the Uganda's Anti-Homosexuality Bill. Lively's work has been described as inciting the persecution of gay men and lesbians and as "conduct ... actively trying to harm and deprive other people of their rights".

In August 2013, Judge Michael A. Ponsor ruled that the plaintiffs were on solid ground under international and federal law in rejecting a jurisdictional challenge to the suit. He also ruled that First Amendment defenses for Lively's conduct were premature. In the same year, David Bahati drafted the Anti Homosexual Bill, a private member's bill, that would take away basic human rights and criminalize anyone who identifies as a member LGBTQ Community. "As soon as parliament passed the AHA on 20 December 2013, violations against LGBTI people increased'. There were many wrongful arrests and violations committed by the local police. Often times, Victims took asylum at neighboring states were conditions were less atrocious, and there are Acts in place for their protection. Moreover, the Bill was then blocked by Uganda's supreme court, a few months later, as it was deemed unconstitutional.

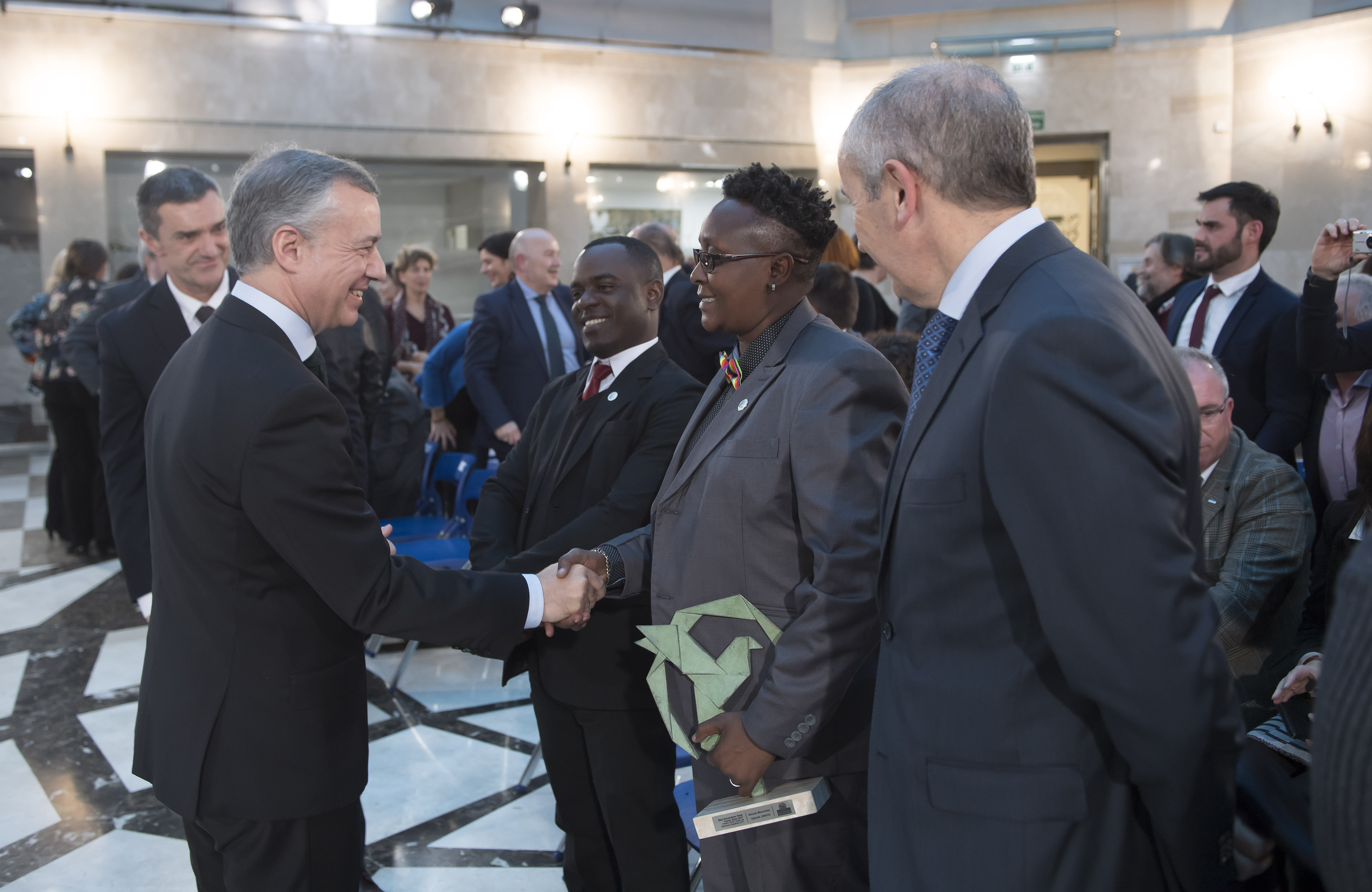
SMUG members accepting the 2017 René Cassin award, administered by Lehendakari Iñigo Urkullu of Basque

In 2017, Lehendakari Iñigo Urkullu of the Basque Government presented SMUG with the René Cassin award.

In August 2022, SMUG was ordered by the Ugandan government to immediately shut down. The government said that SMUG had failed to properly register its name with the National Bureau for Non-Governmental Organizations. The NGO Bureau issued a statement saying that SMUG's registration attempt in 2012 was rejected because its full name was deemed "undesirable". In response to the shutdown order, executive director Frank Mugisha called it "a clear witch hunt rooted in systematic homophobia, fuelled by anti-gay and anti-gender movements." This was after numerous attempts to register the organization in order to continue serving and representing the LGBTQ+ community. The organization was deemed unconstitutional per parliament advocacy. SMUG represented individuals of the LGBTQ+ community and helped protect basic human rights that have been an issue in marginalized communities.

On May 26, 2023, the Anti-Homosexuality Act, 2023 was signed into law by the President of Uganda, Yoweri Museveni. The law states that any individual who has sexual relations with another of the same sex can be incarcerated for life or, in some circumstances, receive the death penalty. This drew widespread international condemnation, with human rights organizations, Western governments, and activists criticizing the law as a violation of basic human rights, and expressing concern about the potential consequences for the LGBTQ+ community. The law reflects strong anti-LGBTQ+ sentiments in Uganda where homosexuality is often viewed as culturally unacceptable and against religious beliefs. Despite international pressure, Ugandan lawmakers argued that the legislation was necessary to protect the country's cultural values and children from these influences.

== See also ==
- List of LGBT rights organizations
