= David Bahati =

Ugandan accountant and politician

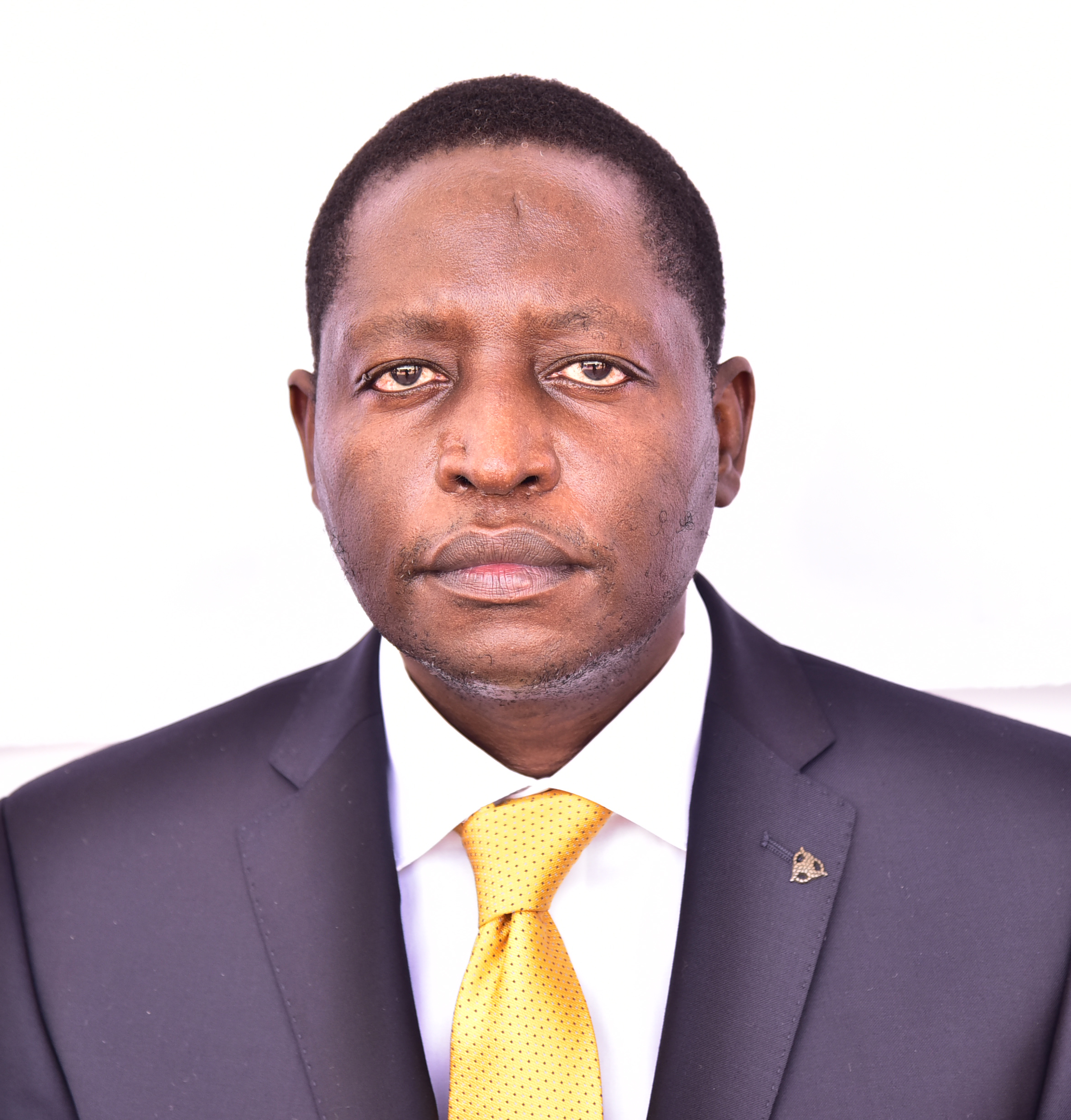
- Born: Ndorwa, Kabale District, Uganda
- Education: Makerere University (Bachelor of Commerce); Cardiff University (Master of Business Administration); Association of Chartered Certified Accountants (Fellow of the Association of Chartered Certified Accountant)
- Occupations: Accountant and politician
- Years active: 1996 – present
- Title: Minister of State for Trade, Industry and Cooperatives (Industry); Cabinet of Uganda

David Bahati is a Ugandan accountant and politician. He is the Minister of State for Trade, Industry and Cooperatives (Industry) in the Cabinet of Uganda. He was re-appointed to this ministerial post in 2026. He was first appointed to this position in a cabinet reshuffle on 9 June 2021. He was previously the Minister of State for Finance, Planning and Economic Development (Planning) replacing Matia Kasaija.

== Education ==
Bahati is a Fellow of the Chartered Certified Accountants (FCCA). He received a Bachelor of Commerce degree from Makerere University, Uganda, a Master of Business Administration (MBA) degree from Cardiff University, an executive certificate in strategic management from the Wharton School at the University of Pennsylvania, an executive certificate in campaign leadership from the Leadership Institute, and a diploma in business English from the Manchester Business School. Carl Cooper, former the bishop of St. Davids, said, "It was wonderful to discover that the local MP, Mr David Bahati, also had a Master's degree from the University of Wales and had spent time studying in Cardiff. Wales’ influence often stretches further than we realise." Before entering politics, Bahati was head of finance and administration at Uganda's Population Secretariat.

== Political career ==
He is a member of the National Resistance Movement (NRM), the ruling party and is the Chairperson NRM Kabale District. He was a Member of Parliament for Ndorwa County West Constituency, Kabale District, in the 11th Parliament of Uganda. During the 2025 NRM party primary election, he lost to Naturinda Eliab.

== Other responsibilities ==
He is chief of the Scout Board of Uganda. He is the Chairperson of the Uganda National Prayer Breakfast Fellowship.

== Introduction of Uganda Anti-Homosexuality Bill ==
Bahati came to international attention in October 2009 after introducing the Uganda Anti-Homosexuality Bill as a Private Member's Bill on 13 October proposing that a new offence be created in Uganda named "aggravated homosexuality" which would be punishable as a capital offence. The proposals included plans to introduce the death penalty for gay adults who had sex with those of the same sex under 18, with disabled people, or when the accused party is HIV-positive, or for those previously convicted of homosexuality-related offences. Journalist and gay rights activist Jeff Sharlet (winner of the International Gay and Lesbian Human Rights Commission's Outspoken Award) claims that in a private conversation Bahati expressed a desire to "kill every last gay person."

Sharlet suggested that the bill came about as a result of Bahati's membership in the Christian group The Family. He revealed that Bahati reportedly first floated the idea of the bill (which at that time included the death penalty for homosexual assaults on minors, disabled people, or by knowingly HIV positive men) during The Family's Uganda National Prayer Breakfast in 2008. Bob Hunter, a member of The Family, gave an interview to NPR in December 2009 in which he acknowledged Bahati's connection but argued that no American associates support the bill. After news of the gay execution law broke, Bahati was disinvited from the 2010 U.S. National Prayer Breakfast.

Bahati was interviewed by Rachel Maddow in December 2010. Bahati asserted that $15 million had been invested in Uganda to recruit children. When pressed by Maddow for "recruitment" tactics, he stated that "They go to a school, teach them, entice them with money, to lure them into this practice". Bahati asserted that videos are being circulated in Uganda that state that "a man sleeping with a man is okay," which were being used for "recruitment". Maddow challenged this assertion, stating that "recruitment of children by gays is a common myth in any and all countries that have debated laws like that proposed in Uganda." Bahati made clear in the interview that the law he is proposing will go through the democratic process of Uganda and be debated upon. In addition to this, Bahati believes that America should respect its sovereignty as well as the fact that Ugandan law will have jurisdiction on Ugandans only.

On 20 December 2013, the Parliament of Uganda passed the Uganda Anti-Homosexuality Act, 2014 with the death penalty proposal dropped in favour of life in prison.

The bill was signed into law by the President of Uganda on 24 February 2014. On 1 August 2014, however, the Constitutional Court of Uganda ruled the Act invalid on procedural grounds.

== See also ==
- Kabale District
- LGBT social movements
