= Manika =

Manika may refer to:

== Places ==
- Manika (district), sub-district of Latehar, Jharkhand state, India
- Manika, Greece, an ancient town
- Bara Manika
- Manika, Kolwezi
- Manika Block
- Roshan Manika

== People ==
- Manika (singer) (born 1993), American pop musician
- Manika Batra (born 1995), Indian table tennis player
- Manika Gauduni, a historical figure in the Jagannath culture

== Film ==
- Manika (film), a 1986 Indian film
- Manika, une vie plus tard, a 1989 movie based on the concept of reincarnation

== Other uses ==
- Manika (Vidhan Sabha constituency), Jharkhand, India
- Ganesha, also known as Manika, a Hindu deity

== See also ==
- Manik (disambiguation)
