= Solomon Male =

Ugandan preacher (born 1962)

Moses Solomon Male
- Born: 17 August 1962 (age 63)
- Spouse: Justine Nanziri
- Religion: Christian
- Church: Arising for Christ

Moses Solomon Male (pronounced 'mal-eh') is a Pentecostal preacher in Uganda and executive director of Arising For Christ. He is an outspoken critic of corruption in churches, especially those that promote prosperity theology which he calls "the gospel of extortion".

== Biography ==
Male was born on 17 August 1962, and converted to Christianity on 31 October 1987.

=== Ministry ===
In 1988 he became one of the ministers of a church, Holy Church of Christ, "New Chapter" renamed The Synagogue Church of All Nations, whose leaders and members are followers of John Obiri Yeboah, a Ghanaian-born former Catholic priest who came to Uganda. Male left that church in 1992, denouncing it as a cult. In 1993 Male was arrested as a result of his accusations against the church, but he was later released and the case was withdrawn.

In 1999 he founded Arising for Christ (ARCH), a Christian organisation. The organisation claimed in January 2008 to have compiled a list of 300 believers who accuse born-again pastors of extortion, fraud, sex slavery and other crimes.

In an interview with the Financial Times, Male claimed to be following Martin Luther who centuries before had railed against vice, luxury and corruption among his fellow clergy. He compares the manipulation of sick people, into paying for prayers, to the sale of indulgences:

"The man who stood against the evil in the church was Martin Luther, because he was against the selling of worthless objects which were to save you from hell. The moment he started the Protestant movement, it gave hope that when something is wrong, there is the possibility of setting it right."

Described as Uganda's "homophobe-in-chief", he is a member of a group of influential pastors campaigning against homosexuality.

== Campaigns and prominent casework ==
Frances Adroa, an HIV/AIDS patient, in July 2005 was coerced to surrender her car to the leaders of the Universal Church of the Kingdom of God in Kampala in return for promises to heal her of AIDS during the church's Mount Sinai Campaign. She was not cured. During deterioration of her health condition, she demanded back her car. The church leaders, Bishop Gilson Costa and Pastor Gerald Nkayi claimed USh 2,000,000/= (over US$1,200), allegedly for its repairs, which she did not have. On 17 March 2007, she heard Pastor Male on the radio and later called him for an appointment to tell him how she had lost her car. When he confronted the church leaders, they eventually returned it in its damaged condition. When Male publicised the car return in newspapers and other media in 2007, the leaders sued him and Adroa for defamation. The libel claim failed in 2010, and both sides were left to bear their own costs. Adroa had counterclaimed for repairs to the car, but this also failed, as the magistrate did not want to create a precedent for donors to ask for their gifts back if prayers were not fulfilled.

Solomon Male campaigns for greater financial accountability in churches. He says that the practice of giving land, cars or household goods to pastors in exchange for blessings, known as "sowing seeds of faith", is widespread in Uganda, and is generally not included in the churches' accounts. He reports that such donations are not even reported to boards or auditors, but are treated as the personal income of the pastors. Following up his report, the newspaper Sunday Vision checked the accounts of twelve Pentecostal churches, some of which were known for the practice; none declared any income from "sowing", and despite receiving billions of shillings, only Kampala Pentecostal Church and Redeemed Church had their accounts professionally audited.

Male sought a judicial investigation into the case of Susan Walusimbi, who was encouraged by a former pastor to enter into a relationship with a man whom the church claimed to have cured of AIDS. Walusimbi says the man later died of AIDS; she is now HIV positive herself, and using anti-retroviral drugs to stay healthy.

== Arrest and conviction ==
In August 2009, with five other pastors, he was accused by 6 young men of inciting false testimony of rape against Pastor Robert Kayanja. In October 2012, they were found guilty of defamation aimed at discrediting the reputation of Pastor Kayanja. Male and his accomplices were fined one million shillings each (approximately US$390) and sentenced to one hundred hours of community service. After a rejected appeal, the conviction was upheld in the High Court of Justice in February 2014.

== Criticisms ==
The National Fellowship publicly disowned Male in 2006. He replied with an open letter denouncing their "patriarch" John Obiri Yeboah and other leading figures.

In 2009 a group of pastors from four Pentecostal groups denounced Male as an "accuser of brethren who speaks without authority".

In 2013, he opposed the divorce and remarriage of Bishop David Kiganda, branding it to be contrary to Biblical teaching. Responding to such allegations, Pentecostal pastor Bishop David Kiganda, Kampala district chairman of the National Fellowship of Born Again Churches, says that only a minority of Pentecostal pastors are involved in questionable activities. He and the National Fellowship ran a program called Operation Clean the House to exclude dishonest preachers from the denomination, and declared 15 of their fellow churches to be "cults."

== Personal life ==
Male is married to Justine Nanziri Male and together they have three children.

== See also ==
- Aloysius Bugingo
- Imelda Namutebi
- Irene Manjeri
