= Sasha Ferguson =

Former TV presenter, humanitarian, businesswoman

Fiona Nagirinya
- Born: 1996 (age 29–30); Kampala, Uganda
- Other name: Sasha Ferguson
- Citizenship: Ugandan
- Education: St. Noah Girls Secondary School
- Occupations: Businesswoman, humanitarian, former TV show host
- Known for: Teen TV show host at WBS Television; Founder of Sasha Hair Collection; Founder of Draw a Smile
- Spouse: Canary Mugume (m. 2021)

Fiona Nagirinya, popularly known as Sasha Ferguson, is a Ugandan businesswoman, humanitarian, and former TV show host.

== Early life ==
Born in 1996 in Kampala, Uganda, Ferguson is from the Baganda tribe, which is part of the Buganda Kingdom in central Uganda. Growing up in a family deeply rooted in Buganda culture, she developed a strong sense of community and social responsibility from an early age.

== Education and career ==
Ferguson attended St. Noah Girls Secondary School, where she completed her Uganda Advanced Certificate of Education (UACE), following her Uganda Certificate of Education (UCE) for her Ordinary Level studies. Her career in the media industry began when she worked as a teen TV show host at WBS Television. In 2018, she founded Sasha Hair Collection, a beauty and fashion business based in Kabalagala, Uganda. The business offers hair and beauty services, primarily for women, and has become one of her main sources of income.

== Personal life ==
Sasha is married to Canary Mugume, a journalist and news anchor at NBS TV. The couple met in 2013, while Sasha was still a teenager and hosting a show at WBS TV. They married on September 19, 2021, in a ceremony at Miracle Centre Cathedral, officiated by Pastor Robert Kayanja. The wedding reception, held at Hotel Africana, was attended by guests including Ugandan businessman Sudhir Ruparelia.

Ferguson is the founder of Draw a Smile, a charity organization aimed at improving access to education for underprivileged children in Uganda.
