= Robb Thompson =

American clergyman (born 1953)

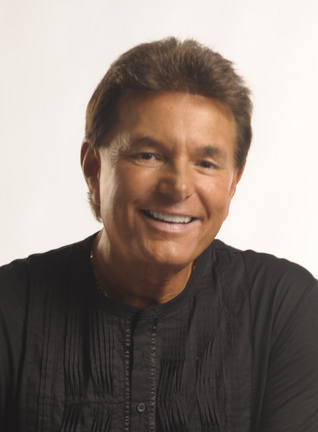
- Born: April 1953 (age 73); Oak Lawn, Illinois
- Occupations: Author; Televangelist; Public speaker
- Spouse: Linda Thompson

Robert D. Thompson (born April 1953) is the founder and president of Family Harvest International, a worldwide network of Christian congregations. He is the founder of Family Harvest Church in Tinley Park, Illinois, a racially diverse church with over 4,000 members.

== Early life ==
Thompson grew up in Oak Lawn, Illinois where he was raised a Roman Catholic and worked for United Parcel Service for the majority of his early adulthood. He moved to Homer Township, Illinois, where he sought "practical answers to life's problems and a real personal relationship with Jesus Christ", and began considering other denominations. He stated that he had a transformative experience on October 28, 1975, where he was "unplugged and reengineered and then plugged in again to Christ" and became a Baptist for several years.

Thompson was given an honorary doctoral degree from Life Christian University, an unaccredited institution and diploma mill, based in Tampa, Florida.

== Church leadership ==
As an ordained minister, Thompson founded Midwest Christian Center in 1983, which later grew into a large worship center. He remained the pastor of the center through the late 1990s. He also pastored the House of Glory church in the 1980s, in Orland Park, Illinois, and held regular Bible study groups. It was during these study groups in 1999 where the name "Family Harvest" was conceived.

Thompson is the founder of the nondenominational Family Harvest Church in Tinley Park, Illinois, a member of the Family Harvest International network. Family Harvest Church, which can hold over 3,000 congregants in one service, has been called a megachurch, noted for its theater chairs, projection screens, polished singing performances, stage lighting, amplified sound, and TV and web shows. In 2004, the church had nearly $10 million in assets.

== Church activities ==
In 1986, in an effort to promote that Halloween is "historically evil" and harmful to children, Thompson's church scheduled a "Hallelujah Party" in its place on October 31. The church has made it an annual tradition ever since.

Family Harvest Church's ministers preached regularly about the risk of a "Y2K apocalypse" during 1998, relating it to Thompson's published interpretation of the Bible. On January 2, 2000, with Y2K essentially a nonevent, pastor Rev. Doug Boettcher's message was about not letting go of one's preparations, urging members of the Family Harvest Church to be prepared "for any kind of natural disaster" and to help their neighbors in such a situation; but many locals had already returned generators and space heaters the day before.

In 2005, Family Harvest Church opposed Tinley Park's decision to zone an off-track betting facility, as destructive of local ideals.

For Christmas 2005, Thompson arranged the donation of over 100,000 articles of clothing, toys, and other goods to Miracle Centre Cathedral, a Ugandan cathedral run by senior pastor Robert Kayanja that is claimed to be the biggest auditorium in East Africa. The items were distributed to displaced persons' camps and orphanages in northern Uganda.

In 2009, Thompson founded "City Harvest", a Family Harvest Church ministry in northwest suburban Chicago.

In early 2011, the Robb Thompson Ministries hosted the "Dancing for the Stars" dinner-dance fundraising event in Orland Hills, Illinois. The proceeds of the event were to go to underprivileged children around the world and to funding Family Harvest's global missions. Over 400 attended the event which helped raise $25,000. With these funds, two medical and dental trips are being organized in 2011, to the Petén Jungle in Guatemala and later to Haiti, where children, orphans and adults will be offered free medical and dental checkups and treatment. The ministries also announced that a portion of the funds will be donated to help Japan after the 2011 Tōhoku earthquake and tsunami.

== International College of Excellence ==
Robb Thompson is Founder of the International College of Excellence, a Christian university dedicated to teaching and training of new pastors "to maximize their personal potential and equipping tomorrow's leaders". He serves as the institution's president. The college is headquartered in Tinley Park, Illinois, a suburb south of Chicago.

== Bibliography ==
- Thompson, Robb. Marriage God's Way! (audiobook). Midwest Christian Center. OCLC 34111558.
- Thompson, Robb (1998). La Decisión Ganadora (in Spanish). Tinley Park, Illinois: Midwest Christian Center. OCLC 60424911.
- Thompson, Robb. Why Financial Harvests are Denied (audiobook). Tinley Park, Illinois: Family Harvest Church. OCLC 226246598.
- Thompson, Robb (2002). Shattered Dreams: What to Do When Your Future Seems Lost (2nd ed.). Tinley Park, Illinois: Family Harvest Church. ISBN 978-1-889723-23-5. OCLC 173262672.
- Thompson, Robb (2002). Winning the Heart of God. Nashville, Tennessee: Royal Books. ISBN 978-0-7852-6487-3. OCLC 53231392.
- Thompson, Robb D. (2007). Solitary Refinement: Finding and Making the Most of Time by Yourself (The Hidden Power of Being Alone). Nashville, Tennessee: Thomas Nelson. ISBN 978-1-59951-029-3. OCLC 190760622.
