= Imelda Namutebi =

Imelda Namutebi (born in 1970) is a Ugandan pastor and she is the senior pastor and founder of Liberty Worship Centre, Lugala, she made history as the first woman to build a 15,000-seat church one of the largest in East Africa.

== Background and education ==
She was born to in Busujju Mawanda, Butambala in central Uganda. Her family was Muslim.

== Career ==
On 3 May 2014, Pastor Imelda opened a megachurch just outside of Kampala. Her church was commissioned by the president of Uganda Yoweri Museveni alongside Pastor Robert Kayanja.

== Personal life ==
In February 2003, Namutebi married Tom Kula at Robert Kayanja's Miracle Centre Cathedral in Rubaga. The controversial marriage was questioned by many as it was known that Kula was already married, with a wife and two children. Her husband died in 2021 after a short illness that was not disclosed to the public.

== See also ==
- Irene Manjeri
- Paul Masaba
- Aloysius Bugingo
