= Jin & Seetal =

British Asian duo

- Born: Solihull, England
- Website: www.jinandseetal.com

Jin & Seetal are a British Asian male and female Bhangra duo from Solihull, England and are UK Bhangra's first British Asian male and female duo act.

The duo was formed in 2011 by two Solihull singers. Jinder Jade and Seetal Kaur they are a husband and wife couple and are a traditional singers who sing in the Punjabi language. They were born in the United Kingdom.

Jin & Seetal took part in women in bhangra with Dipps Bhamrah for the BBC Asian Network. This was a unique, one-off series of live music celebrating the women at the heart of Bhangra music all about women empowerment in the Asian community, this project has helped breakdown barriers and stigmas faced for females in the Asian communities who express an interest of joining the arts in England.

In 2019, Jin & Seetal performed for the Go Bollywood event in The Brunswick Shopping Centre, in Bloomsbury, London, together with groups all over world including The Raga Duo and many others.

By 2022, the bhangra duo have released nine singles on Apple Music and Spotify Digital download platforms. They have been awarded The Special Contribution To Bhangra Music Award by the UK Bhangra Awards. Jin & Seetal has won the Best Female Singer awards on two occasions in 2015 and in 2018.

Jin & Seetal has had worldwide mainstream success with his song for English Premier League football club Leeds United, titled Marching On Together Fans Gonde Boliyan, it is the first ever bhangra song produced for football for a professional club. The Male & Female duo act recently played at Uganda 50 event, celebrating 50 years of Ugandan Asians in Leicester, England.

== Discography ==
=== Singles ===
- "Kol De Kunda" 2011 (Soundpipe Records)
- "Do Chariyan Di" 2012 (Soundpipe Records)
- "Kanjoosa Makhi Choosa" 2013 (Hi Grade Music)
- "Mendhi Mendhi" 2015 (Hi Grade Music)
- "Akhiyan Milake" 2016 (Hi Grade Music)
- "Ek Gal Sun" 2018 (Hi Grade Music)
- "Party Nu Chaliye" 2019 (Desibell Media)
- "Dhan Guru Nanak" 2019 (Hi Grade Music)
- "Heer Ranjha" 2020 (Animal Farm Music)
- "Marching On Together Fans Gonde Boliyan" 2020 (Hi Grade Music)
