= The Iddi Basajjabalaba Memorial Library =

Library in Uganda

- 0.2942158597648136°N 32.604654733483024°E
- Location: Kampala, Uganda
- Type: academic library
- Established: 2001

Other information
- Website: https://www.kiu.ac.ug/

The Iddi Basajjabalaba Memorial Library is an academic library at the Kampala International University in Kansanga, Kampala, Uganda, established in 2001. It was formerly known as the Kampala International University Library. It changed its name in 2013 in the memory of the late Iddi Basajjabalaba, the father of the chairman Board of Trustees, Hassan Basajjabalaba.

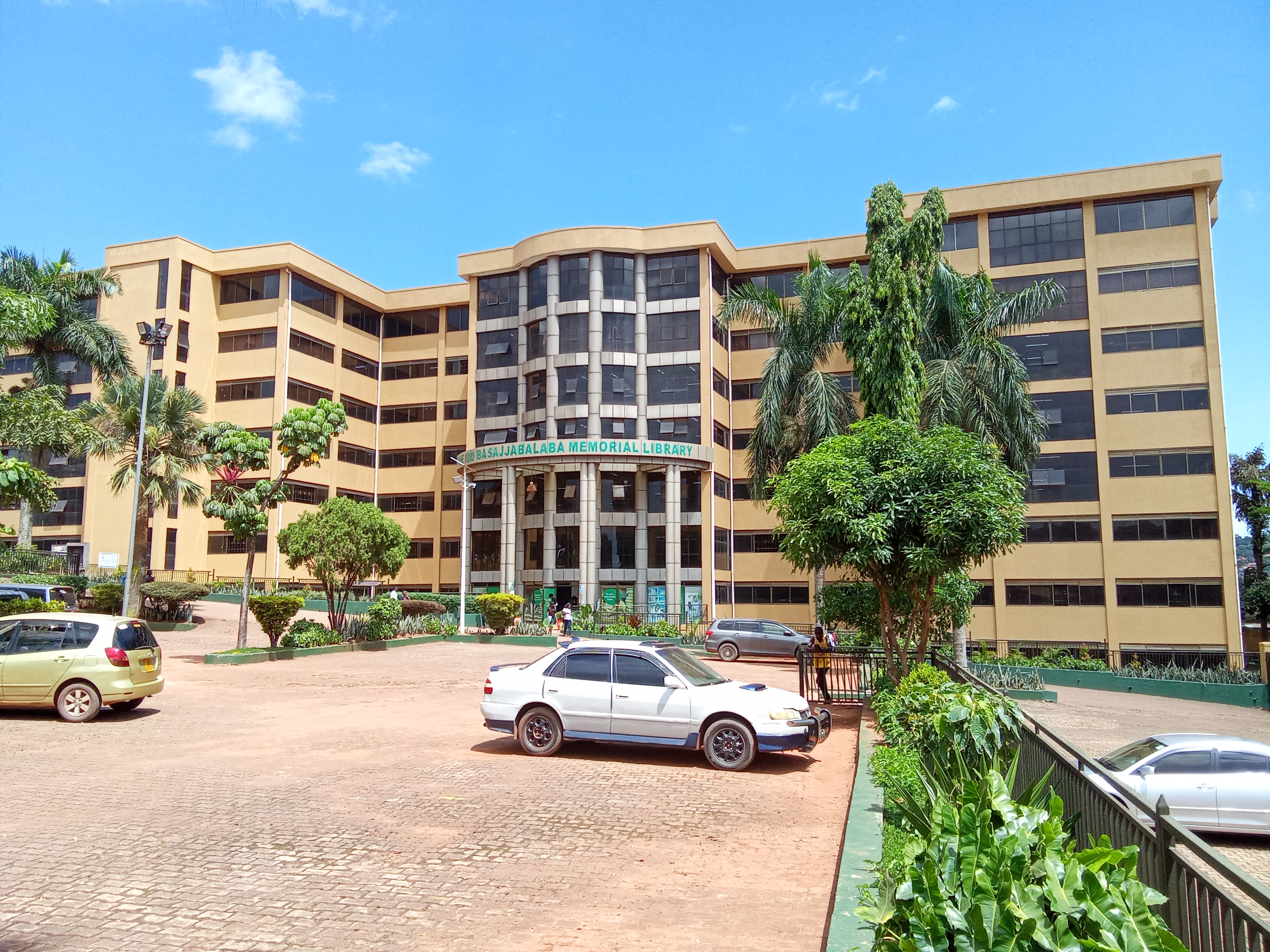
Entrance to the library

== Library administration ==
The library is headed by the chief university librarian, Dr. Muneer Ahmad, who reports to the vice-chancellor of academic affairs. The office of the chief university librarian (CUL) sets policies and directs and supports the programmes and activities of the library. There are other program heads, each responsible for a specific area or function of the library. All policy must be approved by university council, the highest tier of decision making at the university.

== Kampala International University Institutional Repository ==
Kampala International University Institutional Repository (KIUIR) is an institutional repository which collects, organizes and allows retrieval of scholarly articles and books, theses and dissertations, conference proceedings and technical reports in an electronic format. The library uses DSpace software to work in conjunction with the Open Archives Initiative. All institutional researchers can submit content and copyright is according to either the publishing body or the content owner.

== See also ==
- Kampala International University
- Lira University
