= Mycenaean =

Mycenaean may refer to:

- Something from or belonging to the ancient town of Mycenae in the Peloponnese in Greece
- Mycenaean Greece, the Greek-speaking regions of the Aegean Sea as of the Late Bronze Age
- Mycenaean language, an ancient form of Greek
- Helladic period, the material-cultural period in the eastern Mediterranean in the Bronze Age associated with the Mycenaean Greeks
