= Indians in Uganda =

Community of the Indian diaspora

Indians in Uganda Wahindi nchini Uganda
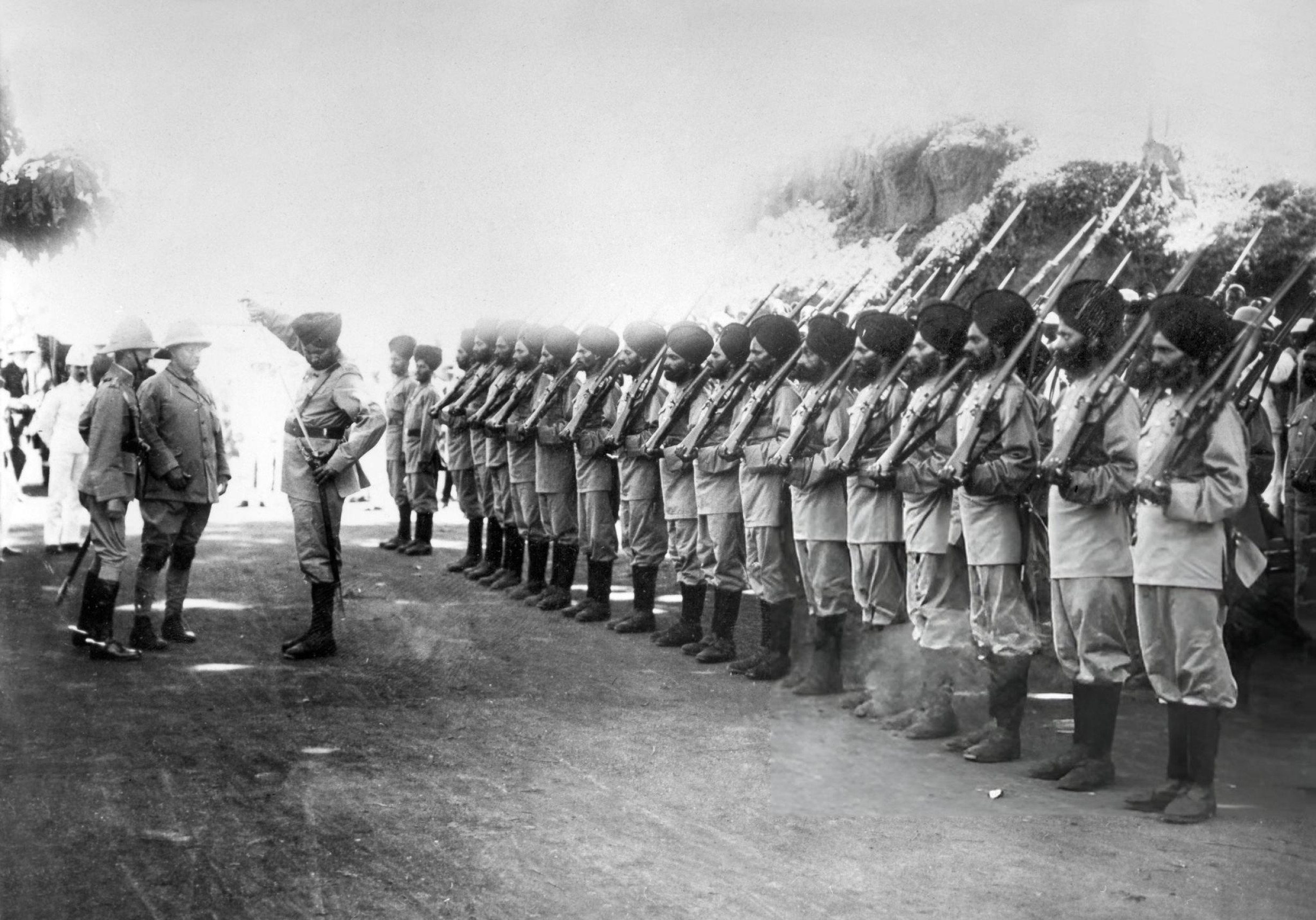

Total population
- 30,000\ (2016)

Regions with significant populations
- Kampala and Jinja

Languages
- Swahili, English, Hindi, Gujarati, Punjabi, Bengali, other Indian languages

Religion
- Hinduism, Islam, Sikhism, Christianity, Jainism, Zoroastrianism, etc.

Related ethnic groups
- Indian diaspora in Southeast Africa

There is a sizable community of the Indian diaspora and people of Indian descent in Uganda. In 2003, there were an estimated 15,000 people of South Asian descent (mostly Indians and Pakistanis) living in Uganda. Members of this community are known as Indian-Ugandans, Indo-Ugandans, and Indo-Pakistani Ugandans. At its peak in the 1960s, the community's population stood at between 80,000 to 100,000 people. However, in 1972, Ugandan dictator Idi Amin issued an order to expel all South Asians from the country amidst a backdrop of anti-Indian sentiment and Black supremacy. In response to the exodus, India, the United Kingdom, and several other countries severed diplomatic ties with Uganda.

After the 1979 Tanzanian invasion of Uganda overthrew Idi Amin and exiled him to Libya, many Indians gradually returned to Uganda over the course of the 1980s and 1990s. This return was significantly encouraged by Ugandan president Yoweri Museveni, who helped depose Amin and actively invited expelled Asians to reclaim their properties and invest in Uganda's economy. Museveni’s pro-business policies and public recognition of the Indian community’s contribution to national development created a more favourable environment for their reintegration.

Today, Indian-Ugandans once again play a dominant role in the country's economy. Despite making up less than 1% of the population, Uganda's Indian community was estimated to be contributing up to 65% of the country's total tax revenue in 2016. Ugandan businessman Sudhir Ruparelia, who is of Indian origin, is the country's richest man, with his net worth standing at approximately US$1.2 billion in 2019.

== History ==
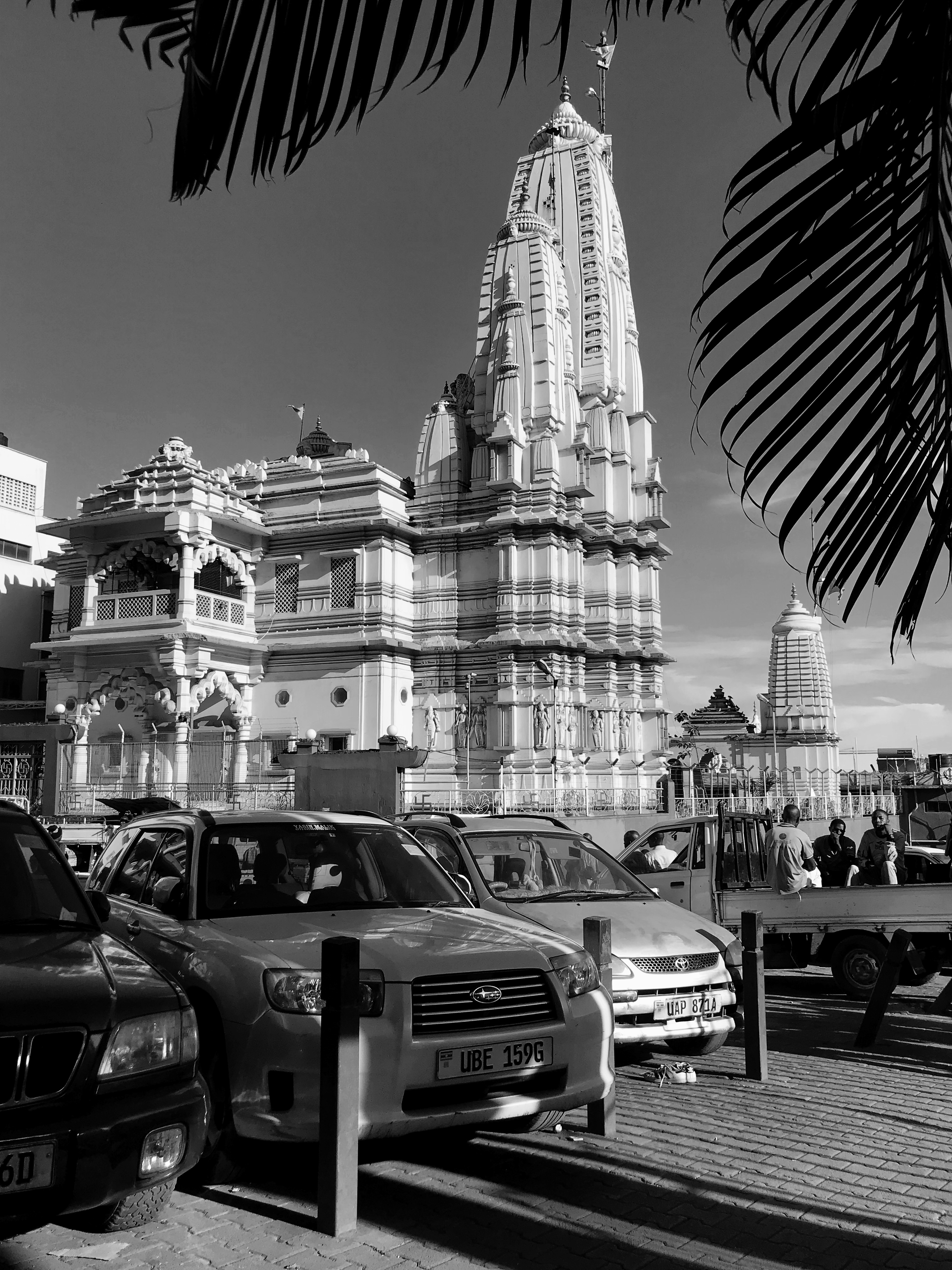
Shree Sanatan Dharma Mandal faith (SSDM) was established by early Asians who came to Uganda to work on the Uganda railway under the colonial era. The foundation stone to this temple, was laid in 1954 and completed in 1964. It was the first Shikma temple built outside India. This structure was built without any iron bars or steel right from the foundation up to its dome which is over four floors high.

=== British Empire ===
In 1895, construction of the Uganda Railway began. The Imperial British East Africa Company awarded Alibhai Mulla Jeevanjee, an agent based in Karachi, with the contract to supply the required labour force. Jeevanjee recruited his workforce from the Punjab region of British India. The first group to arrive had a total of 350 men, and over a six-year period, a total of 31,895 men worked on the project. Some died, others returned to India after the end of their contracts, and others chose to stay. The population was later bolstered by Gujarati traders called "passenger Indians", both Hindu and Muslim free migrants who came to serve the economic needs of the indentured labourers and to capitalise on the economic opportunities.

=== Post-British era ===
Over time, Indians became prosperous and dominated much of the Ugandan economy, with some acting in the role of 'colonial overseers' for the British regime, which prompted the rise of resentment and Indophobia. These resentments came to a crisis when Idi Amin ousted Milton Obote by military coup d'état in 1971. The following year, Amin ordered the expulsion of Indians from Uganda. As a result, many Indians migrated to the United Kingdom, Canada, the United States, and elsewhere and began rebuilding their lives.

A portion of the Ugandan American community traces its roots to Uganda’s South Asian population, particularly families of Indian, Pakistani, and Goan origin who had lived in Uganda for generations before the expulsion of Asians from Uganda in 1972. Following Idi Amin’s expulsion order, many Ugandan Asians resettled in countries including the United Kingdom, Canada, and the United States, where they and their descendants became part of wider Ugandan diaspora communities abroad.

After Amin's removal from power, however, more Indians who were born in Uganda started migrating back.

== Notable Ugandans of Indian descent ==
- Joseph Almeida (educator) - Ugandan‑Goan educator
- Shimit Amin - Indian film director
- Akbar Baig - Ugandan cricketer
- Charli XCX - British singer
- Miraj Barot - businessman
- Nehal Bibodi - Ugandan cricketer
- Anup Singh Choudry - Former judge of the High Court of Uganda
- Hasmukh Dawda - businessman
- Asif Din - English cricketer
- Mobina Jaffer - Canadian senator
- Rahim Jaffer - Canadian former MP and first Muslim elected to the Canadian House of Commons
- Avan Jogia - Canadian actor
- Mohamed Keshavjee - International Family Mediator
- Salma Lakhani - 19th lieutenant governor of Alberta, Canada
- Sikander Lalani - Ugandan steel magnate
- Mayur Madhvani - Ugandan industrialist
- Mahmood Mamdani - Ugandan American academic, father of Zohran Mamdani
- Zohran Mamdani - Ugandan American mayor of New York City, USA
- Irshad Manji - Canadian author
- Jayesh Manek - Indian fund manager
- Bharat Masrani - CEO of TD Canada Trust
- Shekhar Mehta - Kenyan rally driver
- Peter Nazareth - Ugandan American author
- Rajat Neogy - Ugandan American poet, Founder & First Editor of Transition Magazine
- Nandikishore Patel - Ugandan cricketer
- Chirag Patel - Norwegian rapper
- Jitendra Patel - Canadian cricketer
- Kash Patel - Ugandan American 9th director of the Federal Bureau of Investigation, USA
- Priti Patel - British politician
- Nandi Rose Plunkett - US musician
- Fadilah Mohamed Rafi - Ugandan badminton player
- Sudhir Ruparelia - Ugandan businessman
- Omar Sachedina - Canadian journalist
- Naomi Scott - English actress and singer
- Mukesh Shukla - Ugandan industrialist
- Kashif Siddiqi - English footballer
- Wilfred de Souza - Politician and Chief Minister of Goa
- Walter de Sousa - Indian field hockey player
- Imtiaz Sheikh - Indian field hockey player
- Supra Singhal - Ugandan swimmer
- Shailesh Vara - British politician
- Arif Virani - 53rd attorney general of Canada
- Tanvish Vaze - Ugandan cricketer

== See also ==
- India–Uganda relations
