= Namutebi =

Namutebi is a surname. Notable people with the surname include:

- Imelda Namutebi (born 1970), Ugandan pastor
- Kirabo Namutebi (born 2005), Ugandan swimmer
- Sophia Namutebi, Ugandan businesswoman
- Sylvia Namutebi, Ugandan model
- Philippa Namutebi Kabali-Kagwa (born 1964), Ugandan author
