= Obiri =

Obiri is a surname. Notable people with the surname include:

- Hellen Obiri (born 1989), Kenyan athlete
- Innocent Obiri, Kenyan politician
- Kojo Nana Obiri-Yeboah, Pentecostal pastor
