= Voice of Africa FM (Uganda) =

Voice of Africa
Kampala; Uganda
- Frequency: 92.3 MHz, Central Region; 102.7 MHz, Masaka District; 90.6 MHz, Mbarara District

Programming
- Languages: Luganda; English; Arabic; Swahili; Nubbi; Runyankole

History
- Founded: 2001

Technical information
- Licensing authority: UCC
- ERP: 2 kW
- Transmitter coordinates: 0.3338°N 32.5927°W

Links
- Website: voiceofafricafmuganda.com

Voice of Africa FM (Swahili: Sauti ya Afrika; Luganda: Eddoboozi lya Afrika), is a community radio station broadcasting on 92.3 MHz from Kololo hill in Kampala, the capital of Uganda. Founded in 2001 by the Union of Muslim Councils for East, Central and Southern Africa (UMC), Voice of Africa was the first Muslim radio station in the country.

The construction of Voice of Africa was supported monetarily by Libya's then supreme leader Muammar al-Gaddafi, and a US$39,000 donation from Ugandan businessman Hassan Basajjabalaba. When the station launched, it was criticized for playing music, but it became known and accepted for playing Muslim artists and music that was considered acceptable for Muslims to listen to.

In August 2024, the radio experienced historical disruptions in its broadcasting services due to a catastrophic event that affected the country's primary broadcasting infrastructure. A severe lightning strike hit the main transmission towers of the Uganda Broadcasting Corporation (UBC), resulting in a multi-day outage across several radio stations, including Voice of Africa.

The station is officially registered as LLC, Voice of Africa Limited, and it operates under the supervision of the Uganda Communications Commission (UCC). It reaches 75% of the country's population, broadcasting news and programs in the Luganda, English, Arabic, Swahili, Nubbi and Runyankole languages from three transmission sites: 92.3 MHz in the Central Region, 102.7 MHz in Masaka District, and 90.6 MHz in Mbarara District.

After the death of Gaddafi, the radio faced long-term financial strife and some programmes were from then, sponsored by individual Muslims. Voice of Africa has partnered with pay-TV service GOtv Africa on activities to mark Ramadan including radio quizzes, visits to area mosques for iftar, and an Eid al-Fitr celebration at the end of the month.
