= Mukesh Shukla =

Businessman and politician in Uganda

- Born: 1962 (age 63–64); Arua, Uganda
- Citizenship: Uganda
- Occupation: Businessman
- Years active: 1982–present

Mukesh Shukla, commonly referred to as Shumuk (born 1962), is a businessman, entrepreneur, and politician in Uganda. He was reported in 2012 to be one of the wealthiest individuals in Uganda.

== Early life ==
Mukesh Shukla was born in 1962 in Arua, Arua District, West Nile sub-region in Uganda's Northern Region, approximately 480 kilometres (298 mi) northwest of Kampala, the country's capital city. His father was a revenue officer with the Uganda Revenue Authority from 1959 until 1986. The family has been in the business of aluminum saucepans since 1939.

== Businesses and investments ==
Shukla's businesses are organized under the Shumuk Group. The individual companies include the following:

1. A company manufacturing aluminum cooking utensils
2. Multiple warehouses in Kampala and other Ugandan towns
3. A milk-processing plant
4. Commercial buildings in Kampala and other urban areas of Uganda
5. A company that imports and sells pre-owned automobiles
6. A money-lending business
7. A foreign exchange bureau
8. Several hotels in Kampala and other Ugandan locations

== Net worth ==
In 2012, the New Vision newspaper estimated his net worth at approximately US$100 million.

== Political career ==
In the 2016 political season, Shukla contested for the chairmanship of the ruling National Resistance Movement's entrepreneurs league against the current incumbent, Hassan Basajjabalaba.

== See also ==
- Uganda People's Defense Force
- Indians in Uganda
