= Purushottama Dasa =

Odia poet

- Born: c. 1550; Puri, Odisha
- Died: c. 1600
- Occupations: Poet, Accountant
- Writing career
- Language: Odia
- Genres: Mythology, Philosophy
- Notable works: Kanchi Kaveri, Ganga Mahatmya, Dutia Osha, Gundicha Bije

Purushottama Dasa (alternatively spelled Purushottam Das; c. 1550-1600) was a sixteenth century Odia poet and devotee of lord Jagannath. He was very popular for his poem "Kanchi Kaveri", based on a real historical incident.

== Life & work ==
Purushottam Das was born in a Karan family in the Puri district of Odisha, the son of Bhagirathi Das. He was a resident of Puri, where he kept the accounts for the Puri Jagannath temple. This explains his ability to recount his personal experiences of the festivals and other ceremonies observed in the temple, as shown in the lines of the "Kanchi Kaveri". He was conversant with the facts of history and the myths and legends connected with the deities and the Gajapati Kings of Puri. The "Kanchi Kaveri" described the myths connected with Jagannath as an unseen power leading the army of the Gajapati king of Odisha, the legends of Manika Gauduni and the Lord Krishna and Balaram, and the story of King Purushottama Deva's love for and marriage to a princess of Kanchi; these were all woven skilfully into the poem, rendering it a piece of classic historical literature in verse. Das’s "Kanchi Kaveri" is considered a unique and pioneering work, and it was translated into Bengali by Rangalal Bandyopadhyay. Of his other works, "Ganga Mahatmya" (Greatness of the Ganga), a puranic poem on the mythological theme of the first flow of the sacred river, was popular enough to be printed in Bengali script for use among the Bengali readers. "Mriguni Stuti", "Dutia Osha" and "Gundicha Bije" are also ascribed to his authorship.

== See also ==
- Manika (film)
