= Mantek =

Mantek is a surname. Notable people with the surname include:

- Frank Mantek (born 1959), German weightlifter
- Stephanie Mantek (born 1971), German weightlifter

== See also ==
- Manek
