= Amos Okot =

Ugandan politician

Hon. Amos John Okot
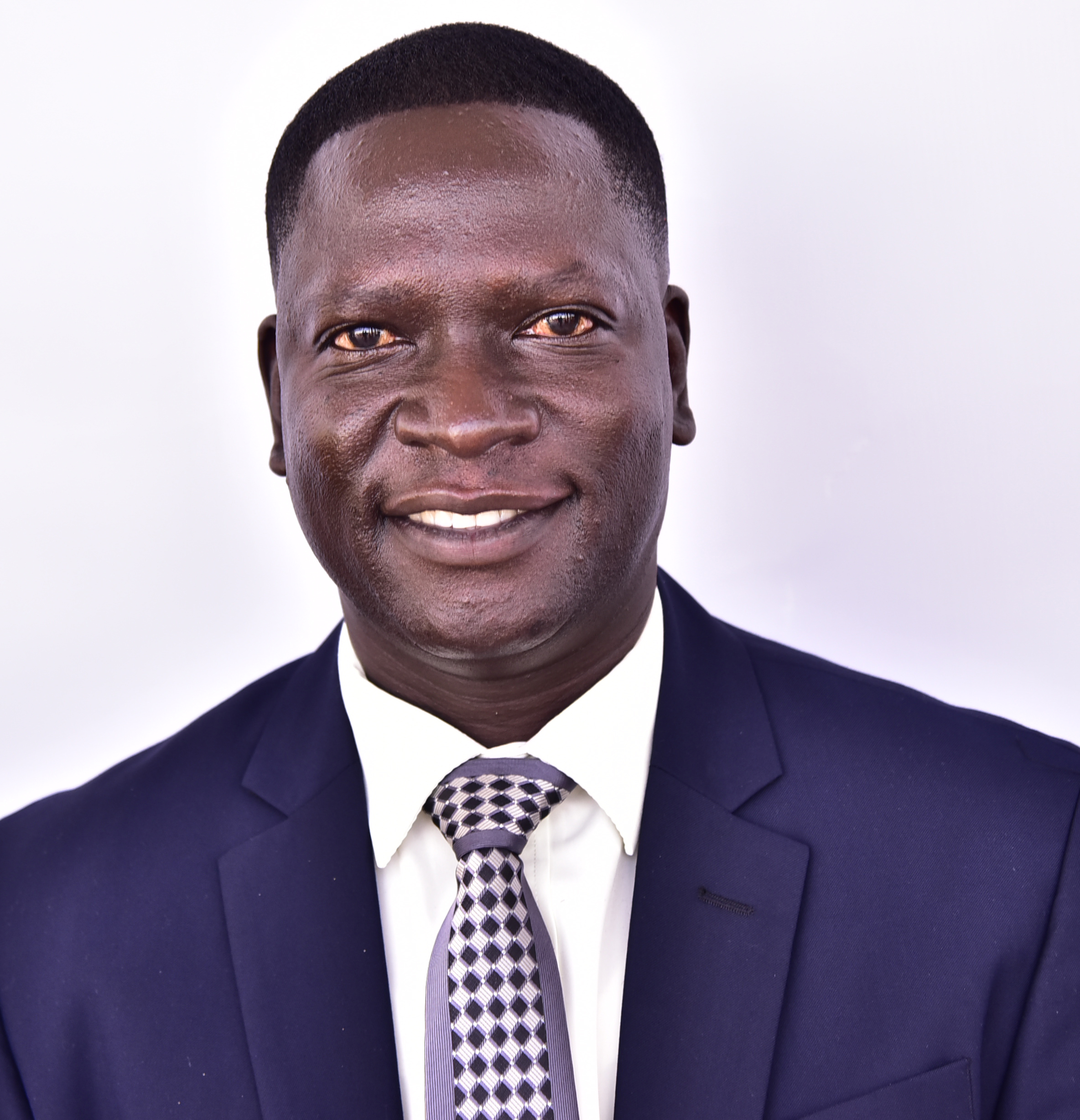

Member of Parliament for Agago North
- In office 2011; 2021 – 2016
- Preceded by: Ogenga Latigo
- Succeeded by: Ogenga Latigo

Personal details
- Born: Uganda
- Party: National Resistance Movement
- Occupation: Pastor, Politician
- Known for: Parliamentary service, political comeback

Amos John Okot is a Ugandan pastor, politician and member of Ugandan parliament representing Agago North on the ticket of National Resistance Movement (NRM). He was first elected in 2011 to the 9th parliament but failed to secure re-election in 2016. He was re-elected to the parliament in the 2021 general elections.

== Political career ==
Okot’s major political career began in 2011, when he won the Agago North seat to the 9th Ugandan Parliament replacing the leadership of the opposition in the parliament Ogenga Latigo. He suffered a political setback on 18 February 2016, when he lost his re-election bid to the 10th parliament to his challenger, Morris Ogenga Latigo who polled 14,079 to lead Okot with 10,420 votes. Okot challenged the result of the election in court with allegations of voter bribery, defamation and non- compliance with Parliamentary election laws against Ogenga Latigo and the Electoral Commission but failed to prove his case and was dismissed with cost awarded against him. Okot later made a political comeback in the 2021 general election when he reclaimed the Agago North parliamentary seat from Latigo who had defeated him 2016.

== See also ==
- Robert Kayanja
- Jessica Alupo
- Jessica Kayanja
