= Rangalal Bandyopadhyay =

Bengali author (1827–1887)

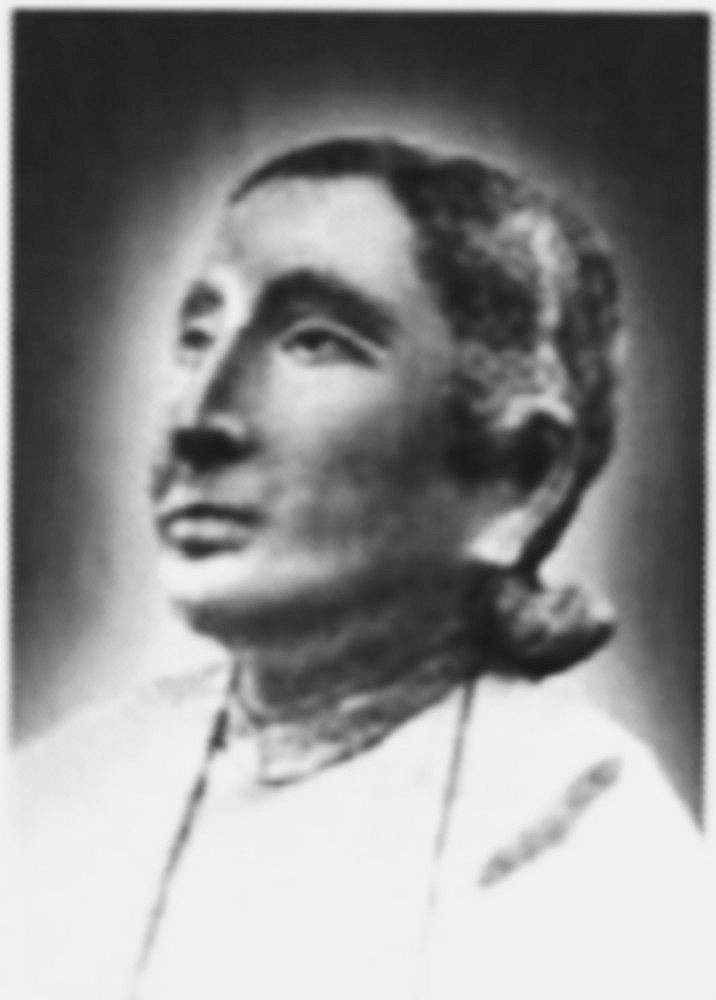
- Born: 21 December 1827; Bakulia, Hooghly, British India
- Died: 13 May 1887 (aged 59); Calcutta, Bengal Presidency , British India
- Occupations: Poet, journalist, author
- Writing career
- Language: Bengali
- Notable works: Padmini Upakhyan, Karmadevi, Shurasundari

Rangalal Bandyopadhyay (Bengali: রঙ্গলাল বন্দ্যোপাধ্যায়) (Born 21 December 1827 – died 13 May 1887) was a Bengali poet, journalist, and author.

== Early life ==
In 1827 Bandyopadhyay was born at Bakulia village, Hooghly district in the Indian state of West Bengal at his maternal grandfather's house. His original home was at Rameswarpur village situated near Guptipara of Hooghly, West Bengal. He lost his father when just a child. After studying at a local school at Bakulia and missionary school, he entered to Hooghly Mohsin College. He was fluent in Bangla, English, and Sanskrit as well as Oriya.

== Career life ==
Bandyopadhyay's poems were first published in Sangbad Prabhakar, the magazine of Ishwar Chandra Gupta. He served as editor in both the monthly Sangbad Sagar in 1852 and the weekly Bartavaha published in 1856. In 1855 Bandyopadhyay was appointed Assistant Editor of the newly published Education Gazette in which both his prose writings as well as poems were published. For some time in 1860 he taught Bangla Literature at Presidency College Calcutta. He joined government service and served variously as Income Tax Assessor, Deputy Collector and Deputy Magistrate.

== Bibliography ==
Bandyopadhyay's first, and perhaps most important, literary achievement is Padmini Upakhyan (1858), a historical romance of Rajput Rani Padmini based on Todd's Annals and Antiquities of Rajasthan. It is known as the first Bengali narrative romance published just after the Revolt of 1857. In this work, a Charan of Rajputana recounts the story of the sacrificial death of Padmini while showing the site of her jauhar.

His important poetical works include Karmadevi (1862), Shurasundari (1868) and Kanchi Kaveri (1879), recreated from the same name in odia of poet Purushottama Dasa. In 1872 he rendered Kalidas's Ritusanghar and Kumarsambhav into verse. His Nitikusumanjali is another poetical translation of Sanskrit poems. His Kalikata Kalpalata is considered to be the first historical work about Kolkata. In 1882 he edited and published Mukundaram's Kavikankan Chandi. The other important books of this poem, which are varied in various fields of Bengali literature, are:

- Padmini Upakhyan (1858)
- Karmadevi (1862)
- Shurasundari (1868)
- Kanchi Kaveri (1879)
- Bhek-Musiker Yuddha (1858)
- Nitikusumanjali (1872)
- Kavikankan Chandi (1882)
