= Manek =

Manek is a given name and surname. Notable people with the name include:

== Given name ==
=== People ===
- Manek Bedi, Bollywood actor
- Manek Mathur (born 1988), Indian squash player
- Manek Premchand, Indian writer and historian of film music

=== Fictional characters ===
- Manek Tigelaar, character from Wicked novel series

== Surname ==
- Brady Manek (born 1998), American basketball player
- Chronox Manek (died 2012), Chief Ombudsman of Papua New Guinea
- Gabriel Manek (1913–1989), Indonesian Archbishop of The Roman Catholic Church
- Gia Manek (born 1986), Indian television actress
- Jayesh Manek (born 1956), Indian fund manager
- Pabubha Manek, Indian politician
- Roma Manek, Indian actress from Gujarat

== See also ==
- Manik (disambiguation) § People with the surname Manik
