= Jessica Kayanja =

Ugandan pastor

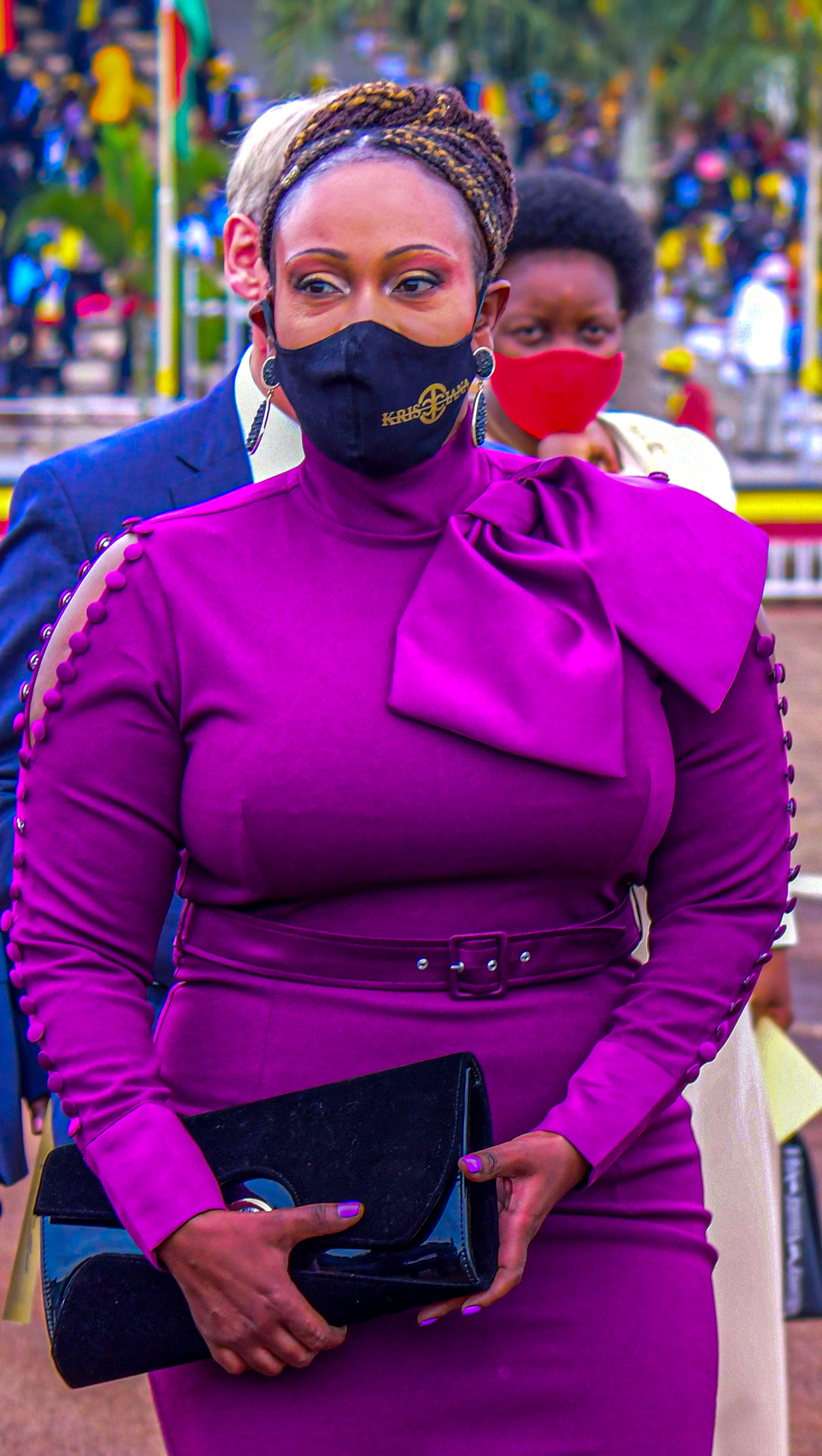
- Citizenship: Ugandan
- Education: B.A.International Relations (1992), Makerere University; M.A. Theology (2019), Life Christian University; Doctor of Ministry (2021); Life Christian University
- Occupations: Pastor, philanthropist and entrepreneur
- Known for: Founder of Girl Power Ministries; Wife of Pastor Kayanja
- Notable work: Girl Power Ministries
- Spouse: Robert Kayanja
- Children: 3
- Awards: Top 50 Most Influential Church Women in Africa (2016)

Jessica Kayanja is a Ugandan pastor, philanthropist and entrepreneur. She is best known as the wife of Robert Kayanja, a prominent Ugandan pastor and founder of the Miracle Centre Cathedral.

== Education ==
Jessica Kayanja did her undergraduate studies at Makerere University, where she graduated with a bachelor's degree in International Relations in 1992. She later did a Master of Arts in theology from Life Christian University in 2019 and later pursued a Doctor of Ministry in Theology from Life Christian University in 2021.

== Career ==
Kayanja is the founder of the Girl Power Ministries, a non-profit organisation that empowers young women through mentorship and education. The organisation aims to build confidence and leadership skills in young women and has impacted the lives of many in Uganda and beyond.

Kayanja is also involved in the activities of the Miracle Centre Cathedral, where her husband serves as senior pastor, and herself too is also a pastor in the same church. Together, they have provided educational opportunities and healthcare services to vulnerable communities in Uganda. Their philanthropic works include implementing several projects, including the construction of schools, the provision of clean water, and the establishment of medical clinics in rural areas.

== Personal life ==
Jessica Kayanja is married to Robert Kayanja, and they have three children together.

== Recognition ==
In 2016, Jessica Kayanja was named among the Top 50 Most Influential Church Women in Africa by African Gospel Media Awards.

== See also ==
- Amos Okot
