= Manik =

Manik may refer to:

- Manik (2005 film), a 2005 Indian Bengali-language film
- Manik (1961 film), a 1961 Indian Bengali-language film
- Manik or T. J. Perkins (born 1984), American professional wrestler

== People with the surname Manik ==
- Moosa Manik (born 1964), Maldivian footballer
- Mikuláš Maník (born 1975), Slovak chess grandmaster

== See also ==
- Manika (disambiguation)
- Manic (disambiguation)
- Manek, given name and surname
