= Manic =

Manic usually refers to being in a state of mania.

Manic may also refer to:

== Toponyms ==
- Manić, a suburb of Belgrade, Serbia
- The Manicouagan River in Quebec, Canada, often abbreviated to Manic
  - Manic-1, a hydroelectric power station and dam at the mouth of the Manicouagan River
  - Manic-2, or Jean-Lesage generating station
  - Manic-3, or René-Lévesque generating station
  - Manic-5, or Daniel-Johnson dam
- Manic or Mányik, a village in the Chiochiș Commune, Bistrița-Năsăud County, Romania

== Film and TV ==
- Manic (2001 film), an American drama film starring Joseph Gordon-Levitt
- Manic (2017 film), a Canadian documentary film

== Music ==
- Manic Street Preachers, a band colloquially known as "The Manics"
- Manic (Halsey album), a 2020 album
- Manic (Wage War album), a 2021 album

== Others ==
- Manic GT, a two-seater sports car made in Canada in 1969-71
- Montreal Manic, an NASL soccer team from 1981 to 1983
- Radivoje Manić (born 1972), Serbian footballer

== See also ==
- Mania (disambiguation)
- Manik (disambiguation)
- Maniq, an ethnic group of Thailand
