= Helladic chronology =

Dating system used in archaeology and art history

Helladic period
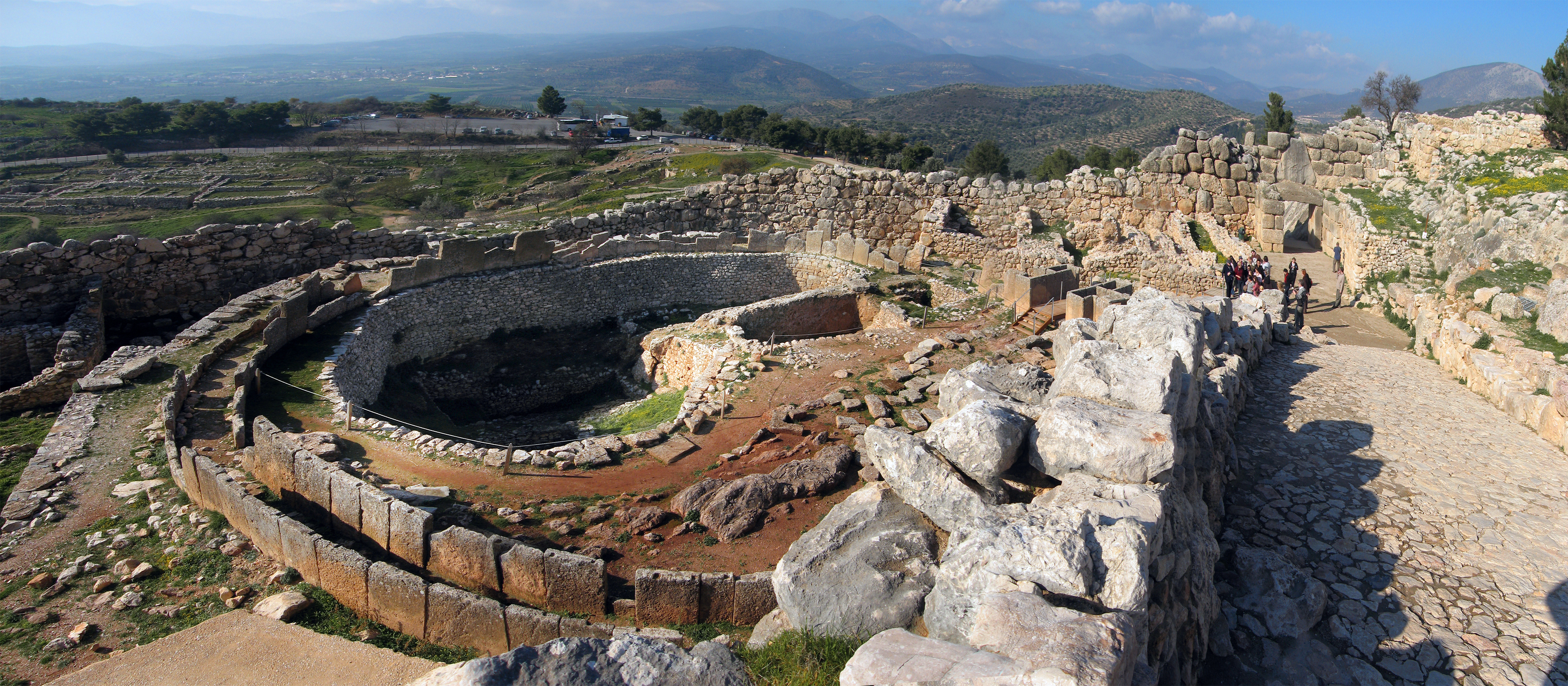
- Period: Bronze Age
- Dates: c. 3200 BC – c. 1050 BC
- Major sites: Thebes, Tiryns, Mycenae
- Preceded by: Neolithic Greece
- Followed by: Greek Dark Ages

Helladic chronology is a relative dating system used in archaeology and art history. It complements the Minoan chronology scheme devised by Sir Arthur Evans for the categorisation of Bronze Age artefacts from the Minoan civilization within a historical framework. Whereas Minoan chronology is specific to Crete, the cultural and geographical scope of Helladic chronology is confined to mainland Greece during the same timespan (c. 3200 – c. 1050 BC). Similarly, a Cycladic chronology system is used for artifacts found in the Aegean islands. Archaeological evidence shows that civilization developed at the same time across the region, so the three schemes align chronologically. They are grouped together as "Aegean" in terms such as Aegean art and, rather more controversially, Aegean civilization.

The systems derive primarily from changes in the style of pottery, which is a benchmark for relative dating of associated artifacts such as tools and weapons. On the basis of style and technique, Evans divided his Cretan Bronze Age pottery finds into three main periods which he called Early, Middle and Late Minoan. These were sub-divided into phases and some of those into sub-phases. The Helladic and Cycladic schemes were devised later and have similar sub-divisions. Evans' system has stood the test of time remarkably well but his labels do not provide firm dates because change is never constant and some styles were retained in use much longer than others. In fact it is partly this lack of dates that has been the strength of Evans's system; several of the dates Evans believed have certainly changed, and others remain under discussion, though within fairly narrow ranges, but the scheme just adjusts for such changes. Some pottery can be dated with reasonable precision by reference to Egyptian artifacts whose dates are more certain.

Helladic society and culture have antecedents in Neolithic Greece when most settlements were small villages which subsisted by means of agriculture, farming and hunting. The gradual development of skills such as bronze metallurgy, monumental architecture and construction of fortifications brought about the transition from the Neolithic to the Bronze Age. The Late Helladic (c. 1550 – c. 1050 BC) is sometimes called the Mycenaean Age because Mycenae was then the dominant state in Greece. At the end of the Bronze Age (c. 1050 BC), Aegean culture went into a long period of decline, termed a Dark Age by some historians, as a result of invasion and war.

== Etymology ==
The three terms Cycladic, Helladic, and Minoan refer to location of origin. Thus, Middle Minoan objects might be found in the Cyclades, but they are not on that account Middle Cycladic, just as an Early Helladic pot found in Crete is not Early Minoan. The scheme tends to be less applicable in areas on the periphery of the Aegean, such as the Levant or North Africa. Pottery there might imitate Aegean cultural models and yet be locally manufactured.

== Background ==
Archaeology has found evidence, primarily in the form of pottery, that a broadly similar way of life was spread over mainland Greece, the Cyclades and Crete as the Neolithic (New Stone) Age was superseded by the Bronze Age before 3000 BC. Evidence increases through Bronze Age strata with social and economic development seen to develop more quickly. Unlike the Egyptian and Mesopotamian civilisations, the Aegean peoples were illiterate through the third millennium and so, in the absence of useful written artifacts, any attempt at chronology must be based on the dating of material objects. Pottery was by far the most widespread in terms of everyday use and also the most resistant to destruction even when broken, as the pieces, or "sherds", survive. Given the different styles and techniques used over a long period of time, the surviving pots and shards can be classified according to age. As stratified deposits prove which of similar objects from other sites are contemporary, they can therefore be equated chronologically.

== Periodisation ==
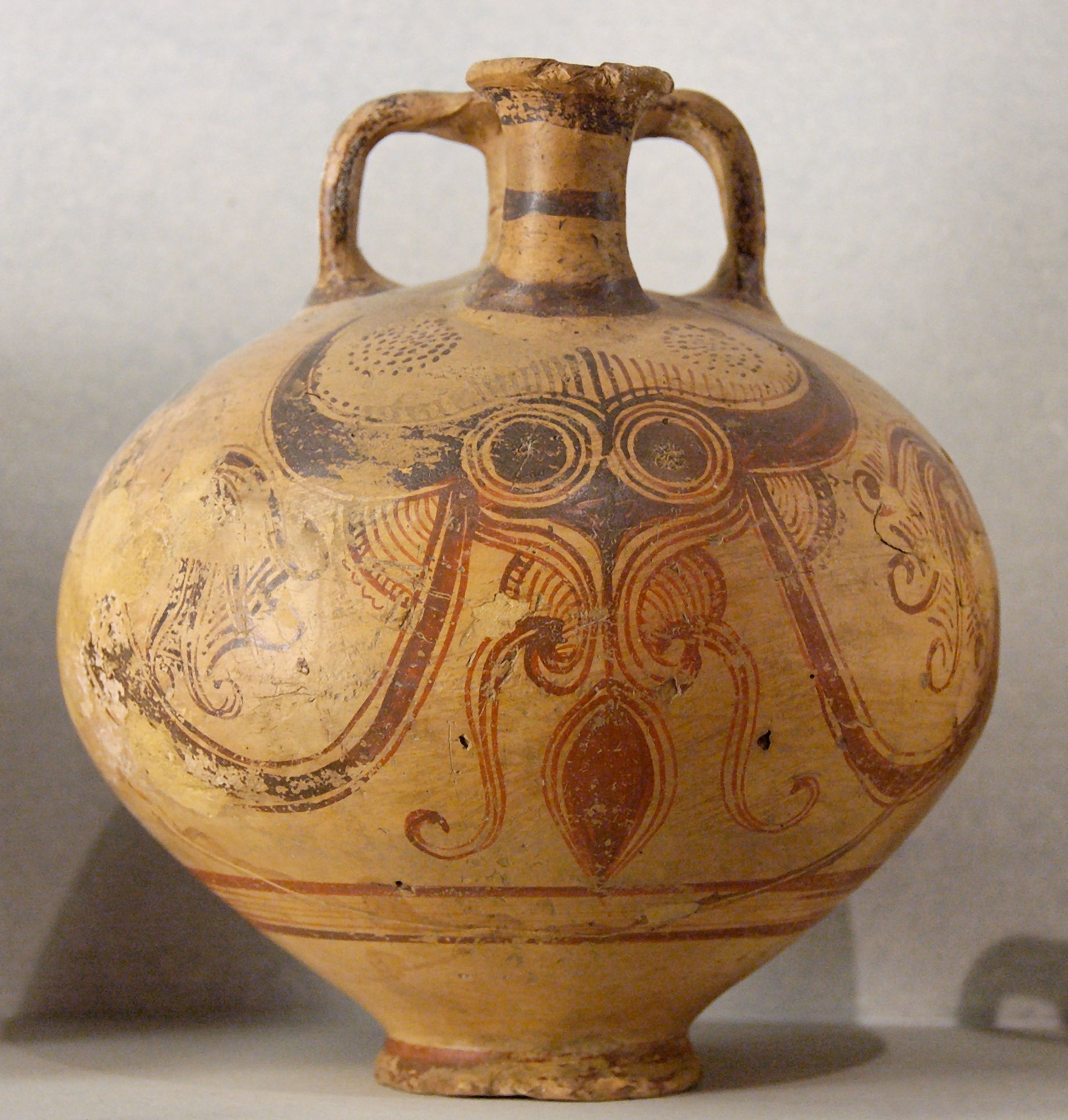
Stirrup vase with octopus decor, Rhodes, Late Helladic III C1, c. 1200–1100 BC (Louvre).

The Early, Middle and Late scheme can be applied at different levels. Rather than use such cumbersome terms as Early Early, archaeologists follow Evans' convention of I, II, III for the second level, A, B, C for the third level, 1, 2, 3 for the fourth level and A, B, C for the fifth. Not all levels are present at every site. If additional levels are required, another Early, Middle or Late can be appended. The Helladic chronology is subdivided as:

Period	Approximate date
Early Helladic I	3200–2650 BC
Early Helladic II	2650–2200 BC
Early Helladic III	2200–2000 BC
Middle Helladic I	2000–1900 BC
Middle Helladic II	1900–1700 BC
Middle Helladic III	1700–1550 BC
Late Helladic IA	1550–1500 BC
Late Helladic IB	1500–1450 BC
Late Helladic II	1450–1400 BC
Late Helladic IIIA	1400–1300 BC
Late Helladic IIIB	1300–1200 BC
Late Helladic IIIC	1200–1050 BC

== Settlements of the Helladic period ==
These are the estimated populations of hamlets, villages, and towns of the Helladic period over time. Note that there are several problems with estimating the sizes of individual settlements, and the highest estimates for a given settlements, in a given period, may be several times the lowest.

Map of Greece showing major sites that were occupied in the Helladic period (clickable map).

Table 1: 3700–2600 BC
City/settlement	3700 BC	3400 BC	3100 BC	2800 BC	2600 BC
Agios Dimitrios				120–180	120–180
Askitario				90–135	90–135
Eutresis				1,600–2,400	1,600–2,400
Lerna				200–700	200–700
Manika				6,000–15,000	6,000–15,000
Raphina				600–900	600–900
Thebes				4,000–6,000	4,000–6,000
Tiryns				1,180–1,770	1,180–1,770

== Early Helladic (EH) ==
The Early Helladic period (or EH) of Bronze Age Greece is generally characterized by the Neolithic agricultural population importing bronze and copper, as well as using rudimentary bronze-working techniques first developed in Anatolia with which they had cultural contacts. The EH period corresponds in time to the Old Kingdom in Egypt. Important EH sites are clustered on the Aegean shores of the mainland in Boeotia and Argolid (Manika, Lerna, Pefkakia, Thebes, Tiryns) or coastal islands such as Aegina (Kolonna) and Euboea (Lefkandi) and are marked by pottery showing influences from western Anatolia and the introduction of the fast-spinning version of the potter's wheel. The large "longhouse" called a megaron was introduced in EHII. The infiltration of Anatolian cultural models (i.e. "Lefkandi I") was not accompanied by widespread site destruction.

=== Early Helladic I (EHI) ===
The Early Helladic I period (or EHI), also known as the "Eutresis culture" c. 3200–2650 BC, is characterized by the presence of unslipped and burnished or red slipped and burnished pottery at Korakou and other sites (metal objects, however, were extremely rare during this period). In terms of ceramics and settlement patterns, there is considerable continuity between the EHI period and the preceding Final Neolithic period (or FN); changes in settlement location during the EHI period are attributed to alterations in economic practices.

=== Early Helladic II (EHII) ===
The transition from Early Helladic I to the Early Helladic II period (or EHII) or Korakou culture c.2650–2200 BC, occurred rapidly and without disruption where multiple socio-cultural innovations were developed such as metallurgy (i.e. bronze-working), a hierarchical social organization, and monumental architecture and fortifications. Changes in settlement during the EHII period were accompanied with alterations in agricultural practices (i.e. oxen-driven plow).

=== Early Helladic III (EHIII) ===
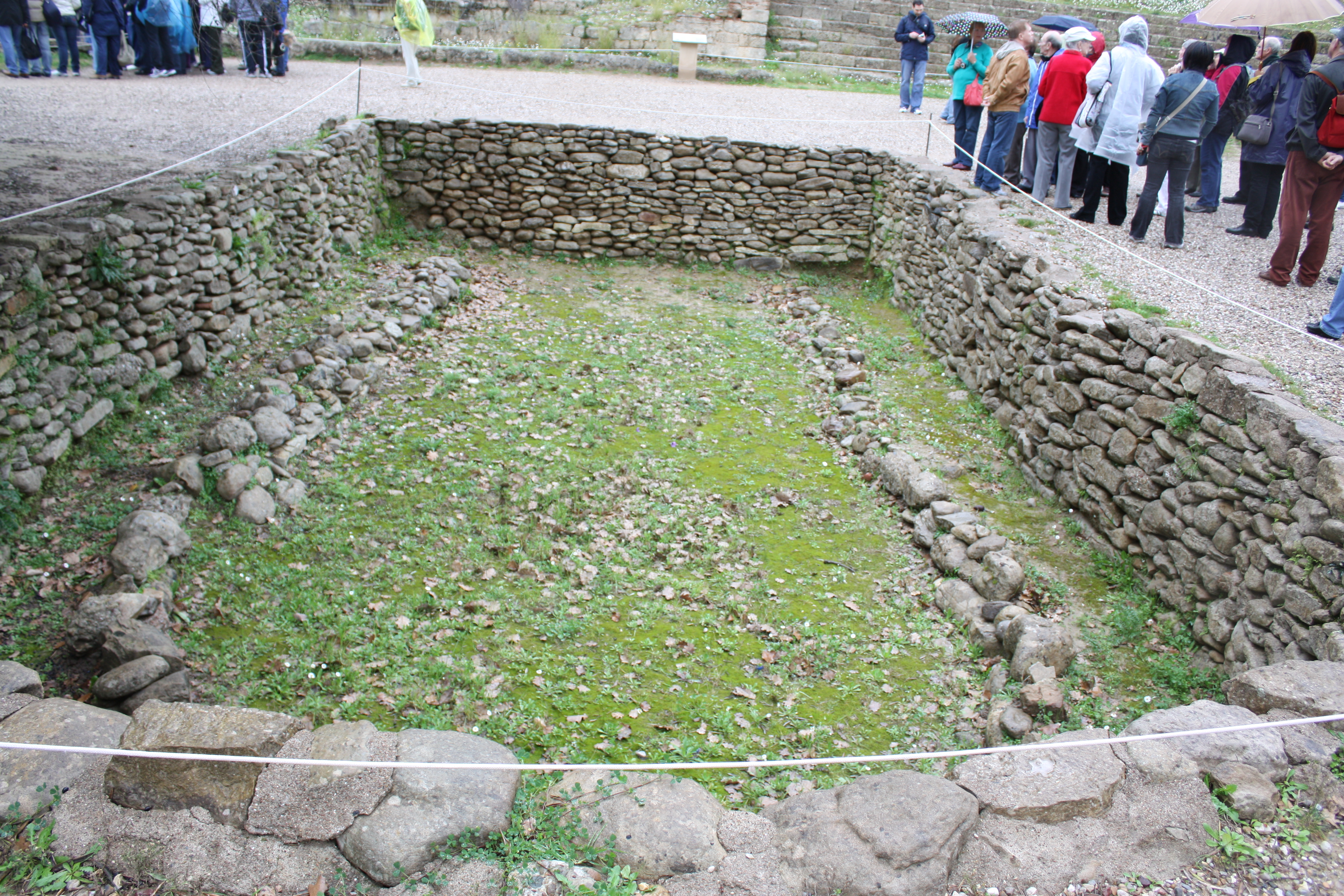
Remains of a building from Olympia, Greece Early Helladic III 2150–2000 BC.

The Early Helladic II period came to an end at Lerna with the destruction of the "House of the Tiles", a corridor house. The nature of the destruction of EHII sites was at first attributed to an invasion of Greeks and/or Indo-Europeans during the Early Helladic III or Tiryns culture period c.2200–2000 BC (or EHIII); however, this is no longer maintained given the lack of uniformity in the destruction of EHII sites and the presence of EHII–EHIII/MH continuity in settlements such as Lithares, Phlius, Manika, etc. Furthermore, the presence of "new/intrusive" cultural elements such as apsidal houses, terracotta anchors, shaft-hole hammer-axes, ritual tumuli, and intramural burials precede the EHIII period in Greece and are in actuality attributed to indigenous developments (i.e. terracotta anchors from Boeotia; ritual tumuli from Ayia Sophia in Neolithic Thessaly), as well as continuous contacts during the EHII–MH period between mainland Greece and various areas such as western Asia Minor, the Cyclades, Albania, and Dalmatia. Changes in climate also appear to have contributed to the significant cultural transformations that occurred in Greece between the EHII period and the EHIII period (c. 2200 BCE).

== Middle Helladic (MH) ==
The Middle Helladic (MH; c. 2000–1550 BC), represents the Middle Bronze Age in Greece. It was a period of cultural retrogression, which first manifested in the preceding EHIII period. The Middle Helladic period corresponds in time to the Middle Kingdom of Egypt. Settlements draw more closely together and tend to be sited on hilltops. Middle Helladic sites are located throughout the Peloponnese and central Greece (including sites in the interior of Aetolia such as Thermon) as far north as the Spercheios River valley. Malthi in Messenia and Lerna V are the only Middle Helladic sites to have been thoroughly excavated.

=== Pottery ===
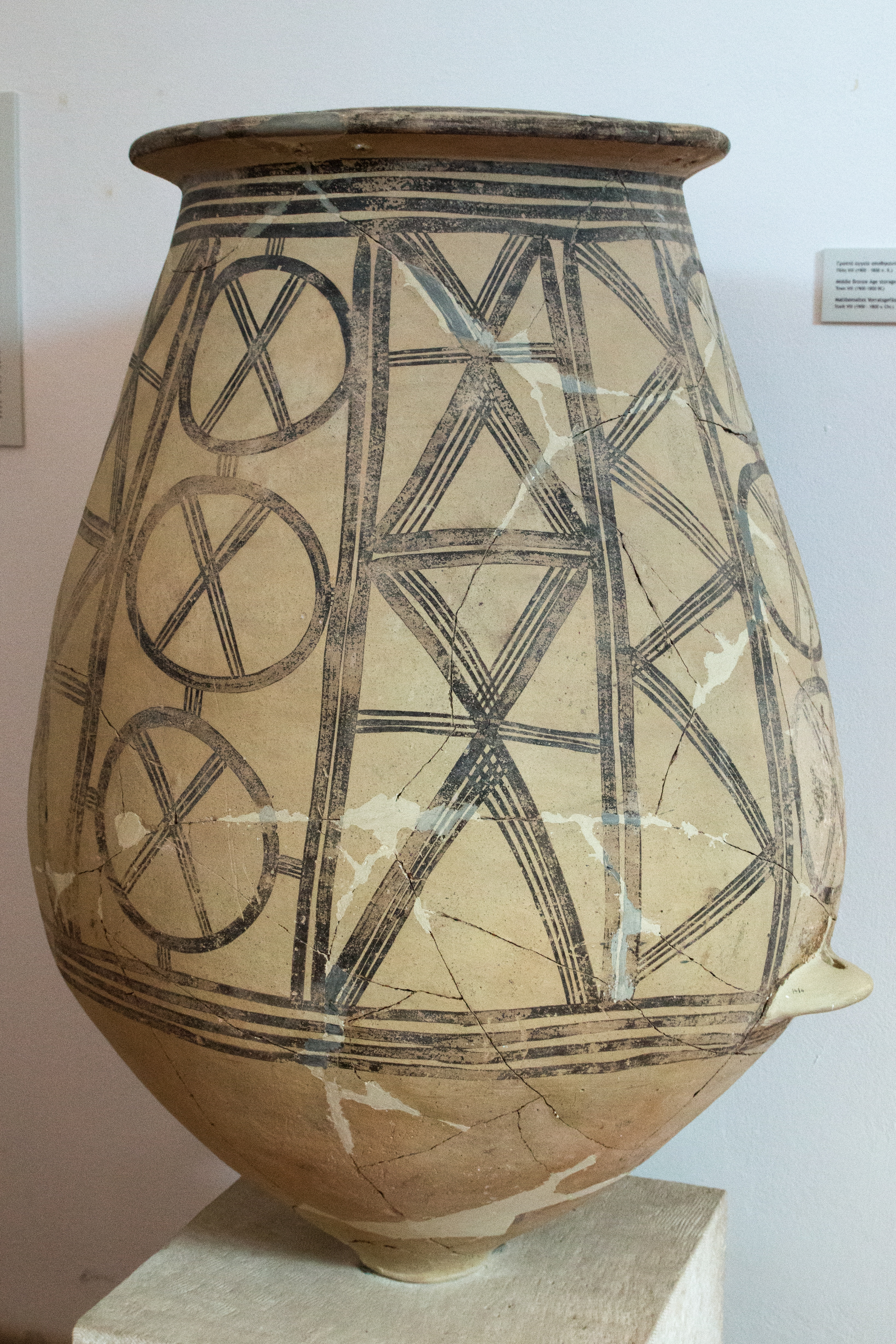
Matt-painted Middle Helladic pottery

The MH is characterized by the wide-scale emergence of Minyan ware, which may be directly related to the people whom ancient Greek historians called Minyans; a group of monochrome burnished pottery from Middle Helladic sites was conventionally dubbed "Minyan" ware by Troy's discoverer Heinrich Schliemann.

Gray Minyan ware was first identified as the pottery introduced by a Middle Bronze Age migration; the theory, however, is outdated as excavations at Lerna in the 1950s revealed the development of pottery styles to have been continuous (i.e. the fine gray burnished pottery of the EHIII Tiryns culture was the direct progenitor of Minyan ware). In general, painted pottery decors are rectilinear and abstract until Middle Helladic III, when Cycladic and Minoan influences inspired a variety of curvilinear and even representational motifs.

Pottery is the most abundant object found from the Middle Helladic period, and it is matt-painted pottery that begins to appear during this period. While Minyan pottery is made on a wheel that produces sharp designs and shapes, matt-painted pottery is sculpted by hand and has dull paint applied.

Matt-painted pottery of the Middle Helladic period demonstrates continuity with stylistic motifs that can be traced back to the Early Helladic Period and even other Aegean cultures. Patterns like oblique lines, zigzags, lozenges, running dogs, spiraliforme, and circles and triangles alternating one another beneath the rim on Middle Helladic pottery have been found to be inspired by Cycladic pottery motifs. Spiraliforme and griffon motifs can also be traced back to Crete. However, patterns like lozenges and pendent-style triangles on matt-painted pottery are a continuation of stylistic motifs from the Early Helladic period, and the addition of vertical fringed lines on pottery is a novel advancement of the Middle Helladic period. With the majority of designs and motifs on Middle Helladic pottery being Cycladic in influence, it can be assumed that the Middle Helladic culture and Cycladic culture interacted with one another heavily.

=== Graves ===
There are four types of graves that are found at sites from the Middle Helladic period; pit graves, tholos graves, cist graves, and shaft graves. A pit grave is self explanatory, as it is simply a pit in the ground, while tholos-styled graves are characterized as being more of a chamber-like tomb. Cist graves and shaft graves are two styles of burial that originate from the Middle Helladic period itself, and it is believed that migrants who moved to Greece during this period influenced the creation of these new burial styles. Cist graves are deep and rectangular with a tumulus, or mound of earth, placed over top and came about during the beginning of the Middle Helladic period. Shaft graves are larger and deeper than cist graves (measuring on average 6 meters long, 4 meters wide, and 4 meters deep) and came about during the end of the Middle Helladic period. Additionally, infants were buried in special jars, pithoi, that generally measure around 30 inches (76 cm) tall. Based on the archaeological evidence, at Middle Helladic burial ceremonies, bodies were placed in graves on their sides with their knees bent (women are placed on their left sides, and men on their right), then those present at the ceremony would drink from cups that they then left at the tomb. Burial customs also included leaving valued items with the bodies, such as pottery or items made of silver or bronze.

At the Middle Helladic site Lerna, there are over 200 graves that have been excavated. While roughly a third of these graves are extramural burials (bodies buried outside of the community), the majority are intramural (buried within the community), including those of towns being built around a cist.

=== Settlement pattern ===
Communities during the Middle Helladic period, specifically Lerna, had irregular layouts with no specific pattern, and houses were tightly packed together. It is theorized that the arrangement of houses may have been based on living close to extended family or close to members of a similar group or faction. Houses were one story tall, built in a "U" shape, and made of clay. Generally houses would feature a porch, with up to three rooms, an inner chamber that would contain a hearth, and spaces for storage and cooking. A larger, free standing house has been identified as a possible home to a chief or leader of the community, and features a separate storage facility as well as a courtyard with a hearth.

=== Economy ===
Agricultural products included crops like wheat (which would be ground into flour for baking), barley, flax, peas, chickpeas, lentils, and beans. Animal husbandry included sheep, goats, swine, oxen, horses, and dogs. The textile industry was prominent, and the clothes made were fastened and often decorated with pins. The people would also adorn themselves in necklaces and bracelets made of stone and shells.

=== Remains ===
By studying the remains at sites like Lerna, it was evident that men tended to eat more protein than women, and women tended to partake more in softer, more processed foods. Stress marks were identified on the skeletons of people of both genders, but men had them to a higher degree, denoting that men engaged more frequently in heavy physical labor than women did. More often than women, men also had higher level of lesions caused by infectious diseases, meaning they had greater exposure to foreign pathogens through direct contact with outside groups and people. This makes it appear as though there was a division in labor between the genders.

== Late Helladic (LH) ==
The Late Helladic period (or LH) is the time when Mycenaean Greece flourished, under new influences from Minoan Crete and the Cyclades. Those who made LH pottery sometimes inscribed their work with a syllabic script, Linear B, which has been deciphered as Greek. LH is divided into LHI, LHII, and LHIII; of which LHI and LHII overlap Late Minoan ware and LHIII overtakes it. LHIII is further subdivided into LHIIIA, LHIIIB, and LHIIIC. The table below provides the approximate dates of the Late Helladic phases (LH) on the Greek mainland, based on Knodell (2021) and Manning (2010):

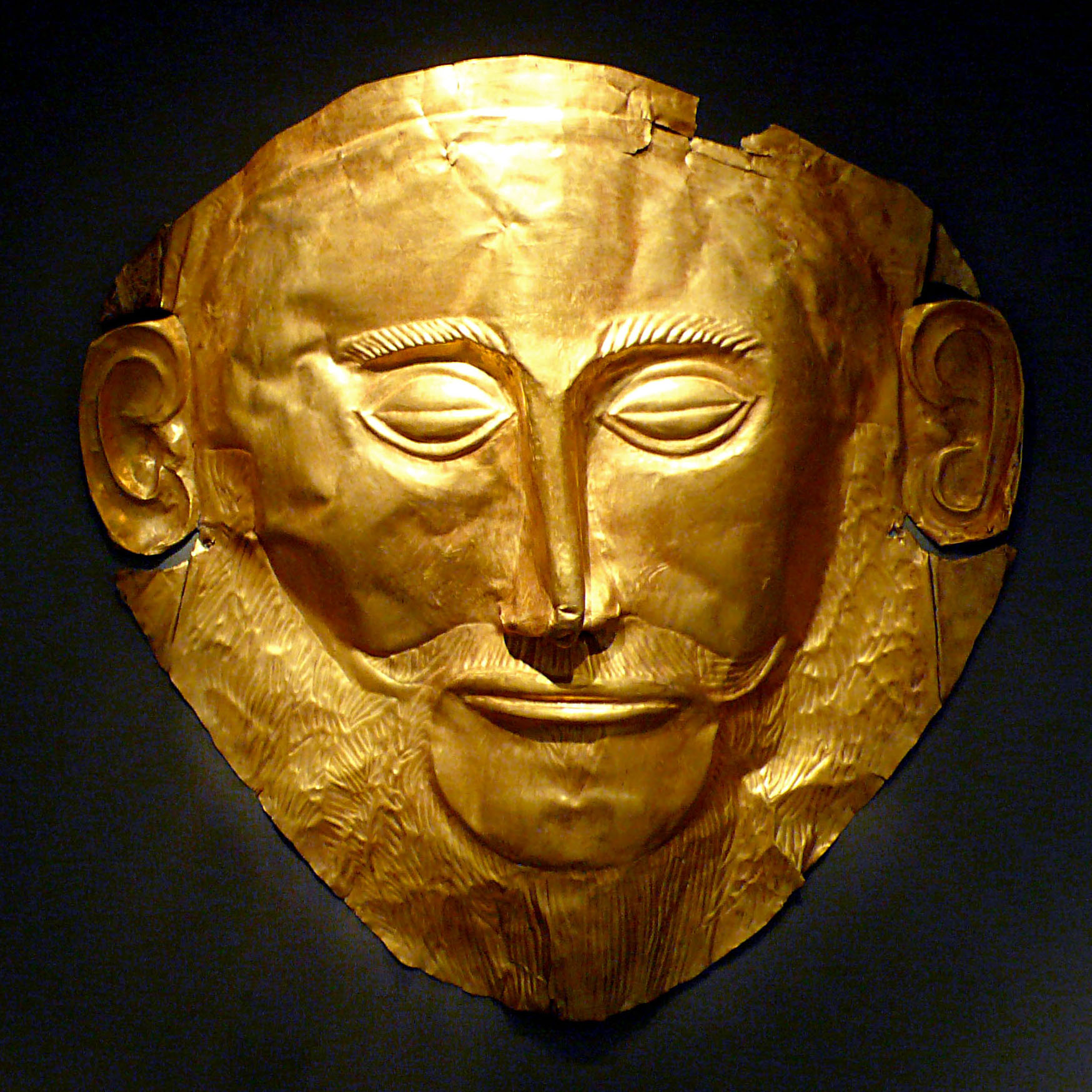
Gold Mask of Agamemnon, Late Helladic 16th century BC

Period	Approximate date
LHI	1700–1600 BC
LHIIA	1635–1470 BC
LHIIB	1480–1410 BC
LHIIIA1	1420–1370 BC
LHIIIA2	1390–1315 BC
LHIIIB	1330–1200 BC
LHIIIC (Early)	1210–1160 BC
LHIIIC (Middle)	1170–1100 BC
LHIIIC (Late)	1100–1040 BC
Proto-Geometric	1070–900 BC

=== Late Helladic I (LHI) ===
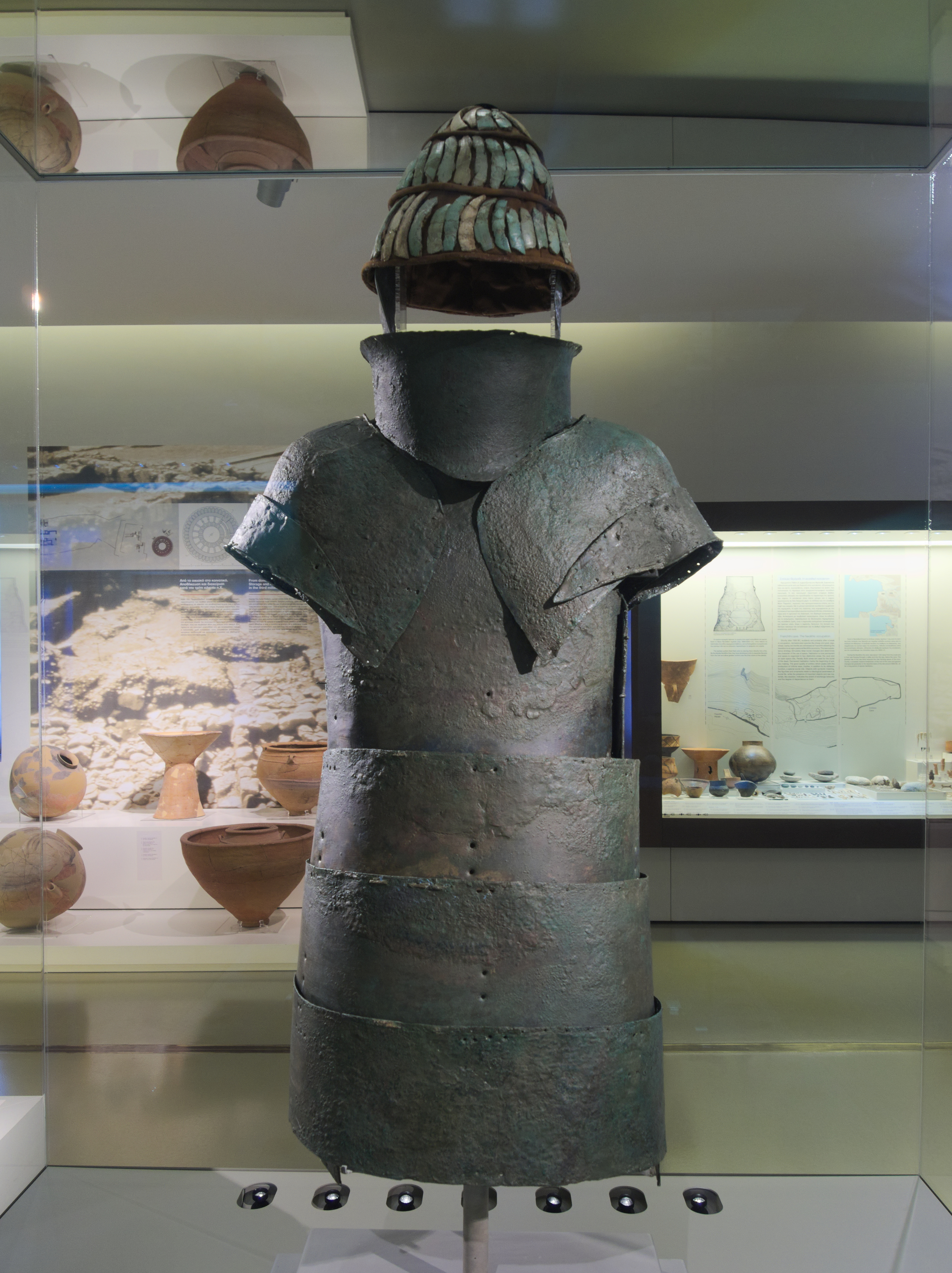
The Dendra panoply, Mycenaean armour, 1400 BC

The LHI pottery is known from the fill of the Shaft Graves of Lerna and the settlements of Voroulia and Nichoria (Messenia), Ayios Stephanos, (Laconia) and Korakou. Furumark divided the LH in phases A and B, but Furumark's LHIB has been reassigned to LHIIA by Oliver Dickinson. Some recent C-14 dates from the Tsoungiza site north of Mycenae indicate LHI there was dated to between 1675/1650 and 1600/1550 BC, which is earlier than the assigned pottery dates by about 100 years. The Thera eruption also occurred during LHI (and LCI and LMIA), variously dated within the 1650–1625 BC span. Alex Knodell (2021), based on Manning (2010), dates Late Helladic I between 1700/1675 and 1635/1600 BC.

Not found at Thera, but extant in late LHI from Messenia, and therefore likely commencing after the eruption, is a material culture known as "Peloponnesian LHI". This is characterised by "tall funnel-like Keftiu cups of Type III"; "small closed shapes such as squat jugs decorated with hatched loops ('rackets') or simplified spirals"; "dark-on-light lustrous-painted motifs", which "include small neat types of simple linked spiral such as varieties of hook-spiral or wave-spiral (with or without small dots in the field), forms of the hatched loop and double-axe, and accessorial rows of small dots and single or double wavy lines"; also, the "ripple pattern" on "Keftiu" cups. These local innovations continued into the LHIIA styles throughout the mainland.

=== Late Helladic II (LHII) ===
The description of the LHIIA is mainly based on the material from Kourakou East Alley. Domestic and Palatial shapes are distinguished. There are strong links between LHIIA and LMIB. LHIIB began before the end of LMIB, and sees a lessening of Cretan influences. Pure LHIIB assemblages are rare and originate from Tiryns, Asine and Korakou. C-14 dates from Tsoungiza indicate LHII was dated to between 1600/1550 and 1435/1405 BC, the start of which is earlier than the assigned pottery date by about 100 years, but the end of which nearly corresponds to the pottery phase. In Egypt, both periods of LHII correspond with the beginning of its Theban "Imperial" period, the New Kingdom of Egypt, from pharaohs Hatshepsut to Thutmose III (r. 1479–1425 BC) of the Eighteenth Dynasty. Alex Knodell considers Late Helladic II to be between 1635/1600 and 1420/1410 BC.

=== Late Helladic III (LHIII) ===
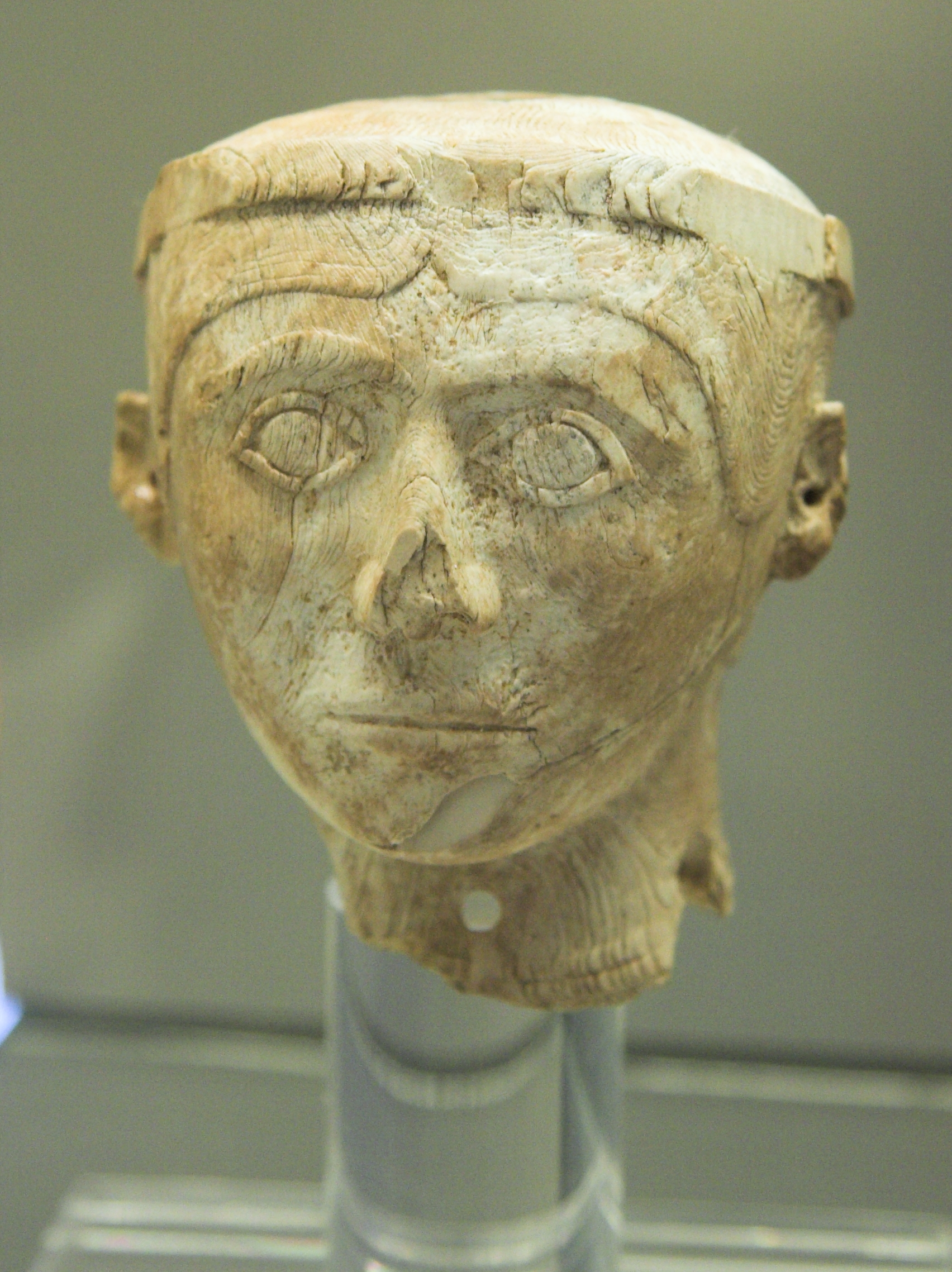
Ivory head, Late Helladic 1250–1180 BC

LHIII and LMIII (Late Minoan III) are contemporary. Toward LMIIIB, non-Helladic ware from the Aegean ceases to be homogeneous; insofar as LMIIIB differs from Helladic, it should at most be considered a "sub-Minoan" variant of LHIIIB.

==== LH IIIA ====
The uniform and widely spread LHIIIA:1 pottery was defined by the material from the Ramp house at Mycenae, the palace at Thebes (now dated to LHIIIA:2 or LHIIIB by most researchers) and Triada at Rhodes. There is material from Asine, Athens (wells), Sparta (Menelaion), Nichoria and the 'Atreus Bothros', rubbish sealed under the Dromos of the Treasury of Atreus at Mycenae as well. C-14 dates from Tsoungiza indicate LHIIIA:1 should be more nearly 1435/1406 to 1390/1370 BC, slightly earlier than the pottery phase, but by less than 50 years. LHIIIA:1 ware has also been found in Maşat Höyük in Hittite Anatolia.

The LHIIIA:2 pottery marks a Mycenaean expansion covering most of the Eastern Mediterranean. There are many new shapes. The motifs of the painted pottery continue from LHIIIA:1 but show a great deal of standardization. In Egypt, the Amarna site contains LHIIIA:1 ware during the reign of Amenhotep III and LHIIIA:2 ware during that of his son Akhenaten; it also has the barest beginnings of LHIIIB. LHIIIA:2 ware is in the Uluburun shipwreck, which sank in the 14th century BC. Again, Tsoungiza dates are earlier, 1390/1370 to 1360/1325 BC; but LHIIIA:2 ware also exists in a burn layer of Miletus which likely occurred early in the reign of Mursili II and therefore some years prior to Mursili's eclipse in 1312 BC. The transition period between IIIA and IIIB begins after 1320 BC, but not long after (Cemal Pulak thinks before 1295 BC).

==== LH IIIB (c. 1360/1325-1200/1190 BC) ====
The definition of the LHIIIB by Furumark was mainly based on grave finds and the settlement material from Zygouries. It has been divided into two sub-phases by Elizabeth B. French, based on the finds from Mycenae and the West wall at Tiryns. LHIIIB:2 assemblages are sparse, as painted pottery is rare in tombs and many settlements of this period ended by destruction, leaving few complete pots behind.

LHIIIB pottery is associated in the Greek mainland palaces with the Linear B archives. (Linear B had been in use in Crete since Late Minoan II.) Pulak's proposed LHIIIA/B boundary would make LHIIIB contemporary in Anatolia with the resurgent Hittites following Mursili's eclipse; in Egypt with the 19th Dynasty, also known as the Ramessides; and in northern Mesopotamia with Assyria's ascendancy over Mitanni. The end of LHIIIB is associated with the destruction of Ugarit, whose ruins contain the last of that pottery. The Tsoungiza date for the end of LHIIIB is 1200/1190 BC. The beginning of LHIIIC, therefore, is now commonly set into the reign of Queen Twosret.

==== LH IIIC ====
The LHIIIC has been divided into LHIIIC:1 and LHIIIC:2 by Furumark, based on materials from tombs in Mycenae, Asine, Kephalonia, and Rhodes. In the 1960s, the excavations of the citadel at Mycenae and of Lefkandi in Euboea yielded stratified material revealing significant regional variation in LHIIIC, especially in the later phases. Late LHIIIC pottery is found in Troy VIIa and a few pieces in Tarsus. It was also made locally in the Philistine settlements of Ashdod, Ashkelon, Ekron, Gath, and Gaza.

== See also ==
- History of Greece
- Linear B
- Mycenaean Greek
- Pelasgians
- Eutresis culture
- Bronze Age
- Poliochne
