= Owino =

Owino is a surname. Notable people with the name include:

- Daniel Owino Misiani (1940–2006), Tanzanian musician
- David Owino (born 1988), Kenyan footballer
- David Owino (footballer, born 1998), Kenyan footballer
- George Owino (born 1981), Kenyan footballer
- Janet Owino (born 1985), Kenyan rugby player
- Joseph Owino, Ugandan entrepreneur
- Joseph Owino (footballer) (born 1984), Ugandan footballer
- Josephine Owino (born 1983), Kenyan basketball player
- Julius Owino (born 1976), Kenyan footballer
- Lawrence Owino (born 1982), Kenyan footballer
