= Manika (district) =

Coordinates: 23.9°N 84.4°E

Manika is a sub-district of Latehar, Jharkhand, India.
