= David Owino (footballer, born 1998) =

Kenyan footballer

Personal information
- Full name: David Owino Ambulu
- Date of birth: 20 July 1998 (age 28)
- Place of birth: Ruiru, Kenya
- Position: Defender

Team information
- Current team: Kenya Commercial Bank

Senior career*
Years	Team	Apps	(Gls)
2017–2020	Mathare United		
2020–	Kenya Commercial Bank		

International career^{‡}
2021–	Kenya	1	(0)
- * Club domestic league appearances and goals as of 25 April 2021 ‡ National team caps and goals as of 25 April 2021

David Owino (born 20 July 1998) is a Kenyan football defender who played for Kenya Commercial Bank.
