= Manika, Greece =

Prehistoric settlement in Greece

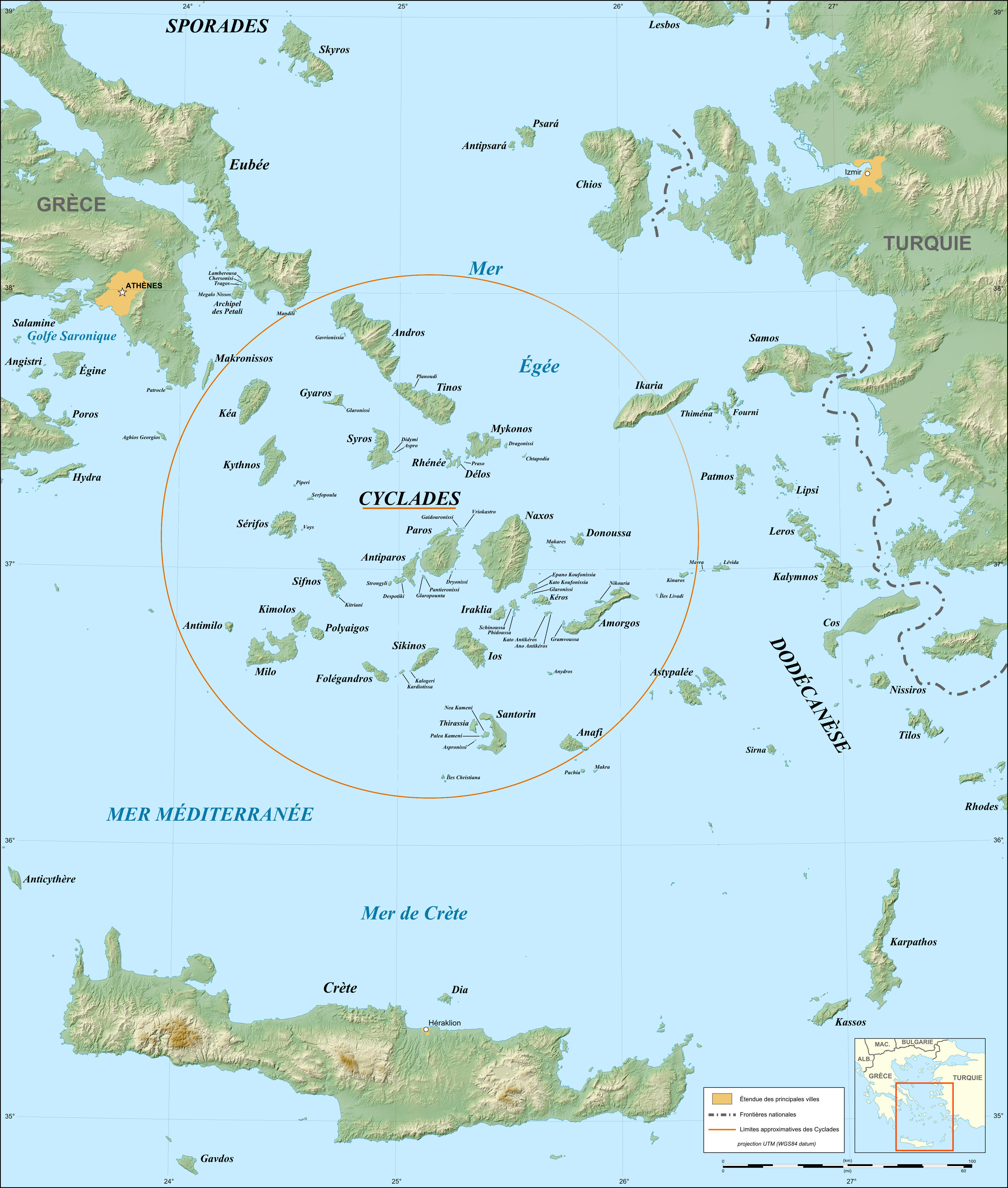
Map of the Cycladic islands, Greece showing Euboea in top left corner

Manika was an ancient town in Euboea Greece, dating to the Early Helladic period II (2800–2200 BC). The settlement covered an area of 50–80 hectares (120–200 acres), and was inhabited by 6,000–15,000 people according to estimates. It was one of the largest settlements of the Bronze Age in Greece.

== See also ==
- Cycladic civilization
- Minoan civilization
