= Manika Gauduni =

Devotee of Jagannath

Manika Gauduni ମାଣିକ ଗଉଡୁଣୀ

Personal life
- Home town: Manikapatna
- Era: 15 century
- Occupation: Milk & Yoghurt selling

Religious life
- Religion: Hinduism
- Sect: Jagannath Culture

Manika was a historical figure in the Jagannath culture, popularly called as Manika Gauduni (lit. ''Milkmaid'' Manika), it is believed that she offered yoghurt to Lord Jagannath and Balabhadra when they were going to Kanchi expedition of Gajapati King.

== Story of Manika ==
Manika was born in a cowherd (Gopala) family, who had the job of selling milk & yoghurt everyday. She was also a devotee of lord Jagannath and had a dream from childhood of giving yoghurt to the Lord.

One day the Gajapati king of Kalinga (now Odisha) started an expedition to Kanchi and prayed lord for help. Lord Jagannath and Balarama were in the guise of soldier, one riding a black horse and another on a white horse marched way ahead of Purushottama Deva's army. But they were not noticed by anyone. Near Chilika lake (still exists a few miles away from Puri) as the soldiers rested to have some food, these two soldiers went to a nearby stall of Manika and requested her to sell them yoghurt. She didn't recognize the lords, thinking as soldiers she asked for money. Lord Jagannath gave her his own precious Gem-studded ring (called "Ratnamudrika") and said she could exchange this for money from the king, who will pass by shortly. When the king reached the spot later Manika stopped the marching king and told him that he must pay her price of yoghurt consumed by his two soldiers in the lieu of a ring. When king saw the Ratnamudrika, he immediately recognized it to be of lord Jagannath. He was overjoyed by knowing that lords were leading his March against Kanchi. The king gave Manika a large number of money and granted a village to Manika for her sustenance. The village came to be known as Manikpatna.

== In popular culture ==
Manika, a black and white movie, was released in 1986 in the Odia language describing the background of this story.

The legend of manika also written in Kanchi Kaveri poem of Purushottama Dasa. That was also the same name in Bengali of Rangalal Bandyopadhyay.
