= Kojo Nana Obiri-Yeboah =

Pentecostal pastor based in Uganda

Kojo Nana Obiri-Yeboah is a prominent Pentecostal pastor from Ghana who is active primarily in Uganda. He is the son of evangelical pastor John Obiri-Yeboah who was a well-known preacher in Uganda in the 1970s and 80s. His father was known for performing apparent miracles in his services.

== Education ==
Kojo Nana Obiri-Yeboah attended Joseph Strechen Junior School and Aquinas Secondary School in Ghana. He continued his education in England, at Dulwich College and later Christ College in Blackheath, London. After a time helping out at his family's pineapple farm in Ghana, he returned to England to pursue a Diploma in Agriculture at Vauxhall College.

Back in Ghana, he managed the family farm and a travel business. There, he felt called to serve God. He later enrolled at Bulham College in London and Pembetchy Bible College in Denmark for Bible studies. Preaching in Ghana and England, he established "We Are One Ministry".

O.I.C Ministry International (We Are One In Christ) Kojo Nana Obiri-Yeboah Is The Founder Of O.i.C Ministry International Which Is Located In Accra, Ghana. The Church Is Located at Amasaman Three Junction(The Temple).

== Personal life ==
Kojo is married to Helen Obiri Yeboah who is a Laboratory Technician and together they have three children.

== See also ==
- Solomon Male
- Gideon Byamugisha
- Martin Ssempa
