= Imtiaz Sheikh =

Imtiaz Sheikh is a British Ugandan field hockey player of Indian ancestry. Sheikh's hockey career has spanned over 65 years, competing in high calibre hockey clubs and international hockey. Taking part in World Cup, European Championships, managing England hockey and coaching at all levels.

Imtiaz Sheikh in 2025

== Early life ==
Imtiaz Sheikh was born in Uganda, Mbale on 28 February 1947. His father born in Amritsar, India, a wealthy business-man and politician. Sheikh's interest in sport initially began with tennis, he was Uganda Junior and Open Singles Champion.

Sheikh started playing hockey at the age of 12; his natural ability, talent and passion was displayed at this young age. He attended Mbale Senior Secondary School. At the age of 16, he became the youngest player to join the Uganda Hockey Squad.

Imtiaz Sheikh moved to London in 1969 to attend university. However, after Idi Amin's, expulsion of Asians in 1972, Sheikh and his family, were forced to leave Uganda and move to the UK permanently.

== Club career ==
Imtiaz Sheikh began his sporting career, becoming the singles club tennis champion with South Croydon, South Hampstead Tennis Club and Wickham Sports Club.

Once in the UK, Sheikh settled in London, joined Hendon Hockey Club from 1972 to 1974. From 1977, Sheikh's involvement became extensive in English field hockey, taking part in The Men's National Inter League Championship which brought together the winners of their respective regional leagues. Imtiaz Sheikh, joined Blackheath Hockey Club, and became the Captain, excelling and became the Winners of the National Indoor Championships in 1975. Sheikh joined Southgate Hockey Club, the championship and was won by Southgate. He then joined Slough Hockey Club and achieved further success. In later years he joined Indian Gymkhana and they won several national championships.

Competing at the National Indoor Championships, at Crystal Palace National Sports Centre, which was televised by the BBC, for the Benson and Hedges Championship Cup 1977. Sheikh won the gold award, for an outstanding individual performance, in the final match, scoring 4 of the 6 goals.

Sheikh won several County Championships for Middlesex County, his winning goal won the title for the County in 1977.

== England Hockey ==
Imtiaz Sheikh continued his hockey career to England Masters. Representing England at various international tournaments, including the Grand Masters World Cup and the European Championships, winning 5 European and 4 World Cups.

In Hong Kong, at the Grand Masters World Cup, Sheikh won the World Cup Player of the Tournament, after winning 4–1 to Australia in October 2008. Additionally, at Real Club de Polo de Barcelona, in the World Cup 2018, Imtiaz Sheikh won the award for Leading Goal-scorer.

Whilst managing England Masters, (O65) he won the World Cup and European Cups. Having won the Grand Masters World Cup title in Cape Town in August 2024, he retained the title in August 2026 in Netherlands. Winning the above title as a manager, he also won the World Cup as a player, in the International Masters Cup.

Sheikh was the Chairman of the LX Club from 2012 to 2015.

He was awarded the Presidents Award; for outstanding performance and service provided for the enhancement of Masters hockey, which was awarded by the World Grand Masters Association.

== Coaching career ==
Imtiaz Sheikh is a qualified hockey coach. He has coached many Universities, including Oxford University, Imperial College London, King's and Alleyn, Royal Holloway, Guys' Kings and St Thomas's.

In 2026 he has been engaged to coach University College London.

== Present ==
Imtiaz Sheikh is currently the England Hockey lead and manager for the Current Men's Squad, Over 65s, for Masters England Hockey. He is also actively involved at playing level.

Sheikh umpires and plays for Bromley and Beckenham Hockey Club.

He also umpires in the South East of England, in various leagues.

== Personal life ==
Imtiaz Sheikh married Zahida, in 1978, and have two children, twins, Tahir and Tahira. He lives in Surrey, England.
