= Roshan Manika =

Village in Pakistan

Shori Maneka is a small village in the Pindi Bhattian Tehsil of Hafizabad District in Punjab, Pakistan. It is located between two motorways, the M-2 and M-3. Most people belong to tribe of Maneka Bhatti.
