= Aloysius Bugingo =

Ugandan pastor and businessman

- Born: 25 November 1972 (age 53); Masaka
- Occupations: Pastor, businessman
- Spouse: Susan Makula Bujingo

Pastor Aloysius Bugingo is a Ugandan born-again pastor and businessman. He is the Director of Salt Media Group of Companies, and a church in Makerere, Kikoni, Kampala, the House of Prayer Ministries International (also known as Canaan land). He was named the most influential born-again preacher by the East Africa Book of Records.

== Early life and education ==
Aloysius Bugingo was born in Masaka and grew up with his maternal grandparents who took care of him after his mother left to live in Rwanda, with his Rwandan father. His uncle prevented him from continuing to a higher level of education, and Bugingo eventually left for Kampala as a teenager following his uncle's abuse.

Upon reaching Kampala, Bugingo initially ended up on the streets, but through friends was directed to Ssentongo Godfrey, who offered Bugingo work at his house and a place to stay. He worked as a House Boy at Ssentongo's house for a while, before Ssentongo gave him a job making and selling popcorn at Owino market. He saved enough money to start his own hawking business selling household items and ladies' dressing gowns around Kampala city. He moved to the Kampala suburb of Kazo, renting a small single room.

Bugingo has a bachelor's degree in theology, and a certificate in Christian Culture Mentoring, received on 28 June 2019 from Kayiwa International University. He was awarded for his contributions to the development of the Pentecostal Church in Uganda, and graduated top in his year.

== Pastoral career ==
On Christmas Eve, 1992, Bugingo found salvation at KPC (present day Watoto church) during a screening of a Christian film, Heaven's Gates and Hell's Flames.

Bugingo started serving as a Pastor at Victory Christian Centre Ndeeba. He began participating in a Christian talk radio station based in Ndeeba, Impact FM, by making phone calls to the broadcast. Bugingo started working as a church assistant, organising the church and leading worship. Joseph Sserwadda, the lead Pastor at Victory Christian Centre Ndeeba, was impressed with his work and appointed him Pastor. In addition to his ministry as a pastor, Bugingo took on other roles at Impact FM, including moderating faith programmes such as Manya Kyokiriza. Bugingo worked at Victory Christian Centre and Impact FM until 31 December 2010, when he resigned, against the wishes of Sserwadda.

After leaving Joseph Sserwadda, Aloysius Bugingo and his wife Teddy founded House of Prayer Ministry International (HPMI), Their ministry began at Bat Valley Theatre.

HPMI launched Salt FM in 2014 and SaltTelevision in 2015. The church congregation and listenership on Salt Radio increased steadily, especially Bugingo's lunchtime prayer services. At one point church members rented out Bat Valley Primary School playground as not everyone could fit in the church. The growing number of HPMI members prompted a search for a bigger piece of land to house the church.

Bugingo has been involved in public feuds with many other pastors in Kampala. He sometimes uses his preaching to accuse fellow pastors of robbing their church members, which has led to feuds between Bugingo and other pastors in the city that are still ongoing. He has been accused of trying to tarnish the other pastors' character to attract their followers to his church.

Bugingo began teaching about missing Bible verses in the Good News and King James Bibles that refer to the Holy Spirit as 'Holy Ghost'. He asked Christians to stop reading the Bible because it was misleading them. He instead encouraged Christians to read the King James Version, but only after ensuring that every verse is present and the 'Holy Spirit' is not 'Holy Ghost'. In Bugingo's view, a ghost cannot be holy, meaning any Bible referring to the Holy Spirit as Holy Ghost is satanic. In 2017 Bugingo declared a burning of the 'satanic' Bibles. He was later sued in court, but denied the accusation, saying he was not referring to physical fire, but 'spiritual' fire. Bugingo was sued at Nabweru Magistrates Court in 2017 by two Christians, Aloysius Kizza Matovu and Evangelist Francisco Semugooma for burning Bibles. Bugingo won, as the presiding Judge said the accusers failed to produce solid evidence that Bugingo had burnt the Bibles, and the fire they showed of Bibles did not indicate him anywhere.

In February 2019, Bugingo's church was sued in the High Court for noise pollution.

Bugingo donated Ushs100 million to the Ugandan government to fight against COVID-19.

In January 2024, Aloysius Bugingo was injured in an attack which killed his bodyguard. Ugandan police said they were investigating the attack as an "attempted murder".

== Personal life ==
In the early 1990s, Bugingo married Teddy Naluswa, and the couple lived in poverty. Despite clashes over Bugingo's born again faith, they stayed together for their children. Bugingo and Naluswa have three daughters, Doreen Gift, Winnie, and Jenifer Bugingo, and one son, Miracle Bugingo.

Bugingo's marriage to Teddy made the national news in Uganda when the couple's conflicts became public. Teddy subsequently stopped attending church, and Bugingo told the church congregation that she and their daughter Doreen were working against his ministry and trying to steal church assets. Bugingo claimed that Teddy had demanded a share of church land in exchange for a divorce. Other religious leaders disapproved of Bugingo's behaviour. In 2019, Bugingo was criticized by fellow preachers and the public for insulting his wife Teddy publicly and disclosing their marriage secrets.

Teddy Bugingo launched her own church, Word of Salvation Ministries International (WSMI) in January 2020. In 2020, five pastors were alleged to have left HPMI for Teddy Bugingo's Church.

In September 2019 he was quizzed by Minister Nakiwala over child neglect.

Bugingo subsequently entered into a relationship with Susan Makula. In December 2019, she announced that she was pregnant with twins.

In June 2021, he was reported to have contracted COVID 19.
