= Irene Manjeri =

- Born: May 28, 1970 (age 56)

Pastor Irene Manjeri is the lead pastor of Bethel Healing Ministries, one of the biggest churches in Uganda, which is based in Kampala. She has written three books, which have been published both in the United States and in Uganda.

== Background ==
Manjeri was born on May 28, 1970, in a small village in Kamonkoli Budaka District. She was born into a poor family, and converted to Christianity at an early age. She did not attend school because her father refused to educate her saying educating a girl child is a waste of time. She's the ninth child of both her parents and the most successful child.

== Charity and humanitarianism ==
Manjeri has been involved in various charitable and humanitarian efforts, including providing assistance to vulnerable populations and supporting local schools and orphanages. She is the Director of Bethel Healing Charity Home located in Kitende and has sponsored over 700 children to school and given them shelter.

== Family ==
Manjeri had her first child, a son, in the 1990s, after being assaulted by a neighbor. She later married fellow pastor Dr. Vincent Katongole, with whom she has two children. The couple separated in 2021.
