= Hassan Basajjabalaba =

Ugandan businessman (born 1967)

- Born: 4 June 1967 (age 58); Ishaka, Bushenyi, Uganda
- Occupations: Businessman; investor; philanthropist
- Years active: 1986–present
- Children: 14
- Relatives: Nanteza Aziidah Basajjabalaba (mother); Nasser Basajjabalaba (brother); Musa Basajjabalaba (brother); Sarah Basajjabalaba (late sister); Kassim Basajjabalaba (brother)

Hassan Basajjabalaba (born 4 June 1967) is a Ugandan businessman, investor and philanthropist. He is best known as the founder, chairman, and CEO of the HABA Group of Companies, a large conglomerate in East Africa with an estimated value of $520M.

== Early life ==
Hassan was born into a wealthy Banyankole muslim family on 4, June 1967. His father, the late Idd Basajjabalaba was the son of a businessman involved in the export of hides and skins, farming, cattle keeping and education. According to the New Vision newspaper, His father was one of the largest landowners in Bushenyi district, located in the western part of the country. Hassan attended secondary school in Bushenyi but dropped out just before his final year to focus on expanding and growing the family business after his father's passing in the early 1980s. This was also around the same time the country was heavily impacted by the coup d'état that overthrew President Obote and brought the current president, Yoweri Kaguta Museveni, and the National Resistance Movement (NRM) to power.

== Business career ==
HABA Group of Companies began as a trading firm in 1986, established shortly after the death of Hassan's father. Hassan focused on the realms of education and the hides and skins industry.

Today, Kampala International University is one of the largest Private Universities in Africa, with international operations in Kenya, Tanzania and Rwanda with Study centers across Uganda such as Kiryandongo and others. HABA Group of Companies has emerged from being a trading company to being the largest group in Uganda, encompassing divisions like; Sugar Refinery, Tea Plantations and Factories in Butare, Buhweju Pharmaceutical Factory, Hospitals and Real-estate.

In 2009, Hassan approached Kampala Capital City Authority - KCCA to lease Nakasero and Owino markets in Kampala which was approved. The management of the markets immediately commenced the process of rebuilding and major improvements around the markets which promoted rental increments that were passed on to the vendors. The later resulted in major strikes across the city and the president was left with no choice but to issue a directive that led to the cancellation of the contract prompting the government to compensate Basajjabalaba billions of Shillings.
