= Manika (film) =

1986 Odia film

- Directed by: R. Asrar, Premananda Mohanty
- Written by: Premananda Mohanty
- Produced by: Yogendra Mahapatra
- Starring: Bijay Mohanty; Tandra Roy; Gurudatta Samantsinhar; Gaddi; Premananda; Gita Datta
- Cinematography: Nagraj
- Edited by: Madhavan
- Music by: Upendra Kumar; Lyrics: Narayana Prasad Singh
- Production company: Rupa International
- Release date: 19 July 1986
- Running time: 135 minutes
- Country: India
- Language: Odia

Manika is a 1986 socio-mythological Odia-language Indian feature film directed by R. Asrar. The film depicts the legendary story of one of the devotees of Lord Jagannath, Manika the milkmaid.

== Plot ==
Manika, a milkmaid (Gauduni) and orphan girl, is a devotee of the Lord Jagannath, convinced that one day she will get a glimpse of the Lord and ultimately attain Moksha: freedom from the endless cycle of transmigration into a state of bliss.

After defeat in the famous Kanchi expedition, the Gajapati of Kalinga now Odisha, India prays Lord Jagannath and moved with the prayer Lorg Jagannath along with his brother Lord Balabhadra started expedition to Kanchi on horse-back. On the banks of Mahanadi, they reach to Manika, who is selling curd. Both the Gods drink curd and presented a golden ring studded with precious gems to Manika and said, 'the king of Kalinga' will come here, after some time, on his way to Kanchi. You present it to him and he will pay you the money. Later, the king himself passed by with his army. Milkmaid Manika obstructed the Gajapati pleading for the unpaid cost of yogurt consumed by Gajapati's two leading soldiers riding on black and white horses and produced the gold ring as evidence. Gajapati identified the ring as that of Lord Jagannath and upon the divine support, enthusiastically led the expedition. Manika is in a state of disbelief and she finally get glimpse of the God. Her ambition of the lifetime fulfilled. She decide to devote her rest of life in the prayer of lord Jagannath.

== Cast ==
- Tandra Ray as Manika
- Bijay Mohanty as Chandra Behera
- Gurudatta Samantsinhar as Lord Jagannath
- Gita Datta
- Gadi
- Premananda Mohanty

== Music ==
The music of the film composed by Upendra Kumar. The tracks from the film include:

| Track | Singer | Lyricist |
|---|---|---|
| Rakhitha mitha dahi | S. Janaki | Narayana Prashad Singh |
| Krushna maya kale | Pranab Patnaik | Narayana Prashad Singh |
