= Jayesh Manek =

Indian fund manager (born 1956)

Jayesh Manek (born 1956 in Uganda) is a British fund manager. He was the winner of the Sunday Times Fantasy Fund Manager competition in 1994 and 1995, beating thousands of other entrants and winning £100,000 on each occasion. This attracted the attention of John Templeton, who gave Manek £5 million to invest in July 1995 and a further £5 million in June 1996.

== Funds ==
In 1995 Manek helped found India Value Investments, a Mauritius-based investment firm investing in Indian equities. In December 1997, Manek became the first British Indian fund manager, establishing the Manek Growth Fund, a unit trust open to public investment.

By 2000, having attracted over £100 million in investment to the Growth Fund, the fund was up by 160%, and worth nearly £300 million. The dot-com crash saw values crashing, and since that time Manek Growth has been a poor performer. In the 1, 3, and 10 years to 2 January 2012, Manek Growth was the worst performing fund in its sector. Heavy holdings in individual, high-risk shares has seen fund values fluctuate wildly, but the long-term trend is only down, and Manek Growth is as of 18 April 2012 worth less than its launch price. Analysis of Manek's long-term failure has noted that he made multiple entries into the Sunday Times competition and that his high-risk approach might result in big short-term gains, ideal in a competition where the only prize is for coming first (most growth), but when real money is at stake, risky.

In December 2017, with the Manek Growth Fund having fallen by 55% over the past ten years (as opposed to an average rise of 269% for his peers), Manek closed the fund entirely, with investors being redeemed.

== Biography ==
Manek left Uganda following the purge of Asians by Idi Amin, in 1971, and has a degree in Pharmacy from Brighton Polytechnic. He founded his own chain of pharmacies, Dallas Chemists, prior to becoming a fund manager. Dallas Chemists was purchased by Alliance Unichem in 1999.
