= Miracle Centre Cathedral =

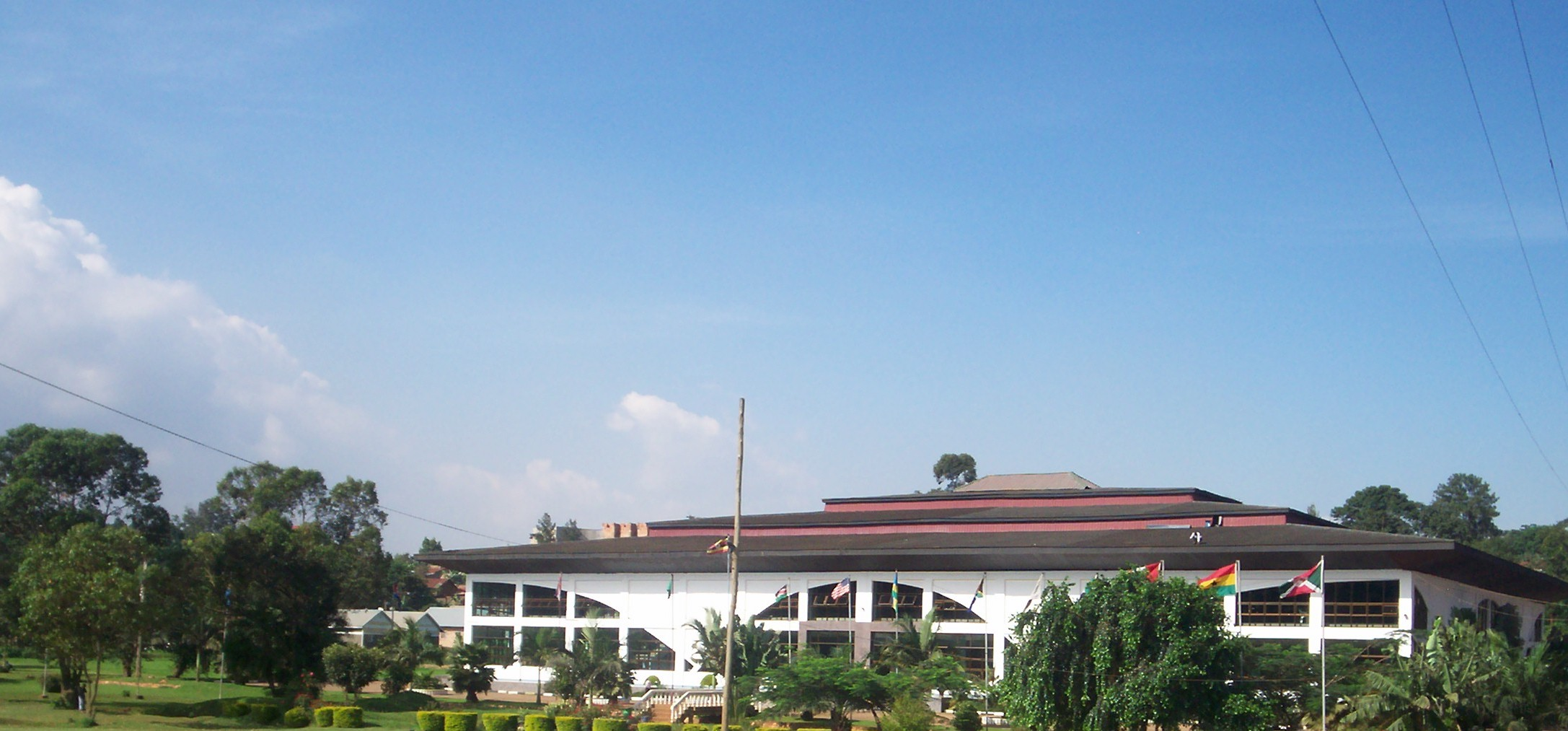
- Miracle Centre Cathedral
- Location: Kampala
- Country: Uganda
- Denomination: Non-denominational charismatic Christianity

History
- Status: Active
- Founded: 1991
- Founder: Robert Kayanja

Architecture
- Architect: Salome Kweyunga
- Completed: 2004

Specifications
- Capacity: 10,500 (seated)

Miracle Centre Cathedral is a Pentecostal megachurch in Kampala, the capital of Uganda. It is one of the largest Christian congregations in East Africa, known for its vibrant services, large weekly attendance, and extensive evangelistic outreach. Senior Pastor is Robert Kayanja and along with his wife Jessica Kayanja, (the founder of Girl Power Ministries) serve as the church's overseers. They have three children, including their son Pr. Robert Kayanja Junior and daughter-in-law Marlena Kayanja. In 2017, the attendance was reported to be around 15,000 people.

== History ==
The Miracle Centre Cathedral was founded in 1991 by Robert Kayanja. He established the ministry with the aim of spreading the Christian gospel throughout Uganda and beyond.

The current Cathedral building, located in Rubaga Division of Kampala was inaugurated in 2004, after several years of construction. With a seating capacity of approximately 10,500 people, it was described at the time as one of the largest church auditoriums in East Africa.

According to Pastor Kayanja and church sources, the Miracle Centre's congregation has contribute to the planting of over thousands of affiliated Miracle Centre Churches across Uganda, and the ministry estimates that over 2 million Ugandans have professed faith in Christ at its crusades and outreach events.

In 2017, the church of Kampala had over 15,000 people.

== Leadership ==
The church is led by Robert Kayanja, a prominent Ugandan Pentecostal pastor. He is the founder and senior Pastor of the Miracle Centre Cathedral and also oversees Robert Kayanja Ministries, which includes media, education, and humanitarian initiatives. He co-leads the church with his wife Jessica Kayanja. Their son, Robert Kayanja Jr., and his wife Marlena Kayanja are also involved in pastoral leadership.

== Congregation and attendance ==
The Miracle Centre Cathedral is reported to draw large congregations for its weekly worship services. In 2017, its weekly attendance was estimated at approximately 15,000 worshippers.

Beyond regular services, the cathedral hosts special events and crusades that attract even larger crowds, including international events with visiting evangelists.

== Events and outreach ==
=== 2004 dedication ===
Ahead of the cathedral's official 2004 dedication service, New Vision reported that Uganda's President Yoweri Museveni and First Lady Janet Museveni were scheduled to attend, along with international ministers and musicians, including evangelist T. L. Osborn and other visiting ministers and musicians. The ceremony was widely covered in national media such as New Vision and it was marked as a significant milestone for the church's growth at Rubaga, Kampala.

=== International crusades ===
In 2007, the Rwandan newspaper, The New Times reported that Robert Kayanja Ministries organised a “mass miracle crusade” in Rwanda. Indicating the church's regional evangelistic footprint.

The cathedral has also hosted international revival events. For example, in 2025 a healing crusade featuring noted televangelist Benny Hinn drew widespread attention, with reports of massive crowds and participation in multi-day services.

== Proclaim music ==
Proclaim music is the official children's choir of Miracle Centre Cathedral, participating in worship services and church events.

== Humanitarian and social work ==
Miracle Centre Cathedral engages in various humanitarian initiatives in Kampala and across Uganda. These include care for street children, support for orphans, and outreach to people affected by HIVAIDS, reflecting the church's commitment to social welfare alongside spiritual ministry.

== See also ==
- Robert Kayanja
- Pentecostalism in Africa
- Religion in Uganda
