= Robert Kayanja =

Ugandan clergy (born 1962)

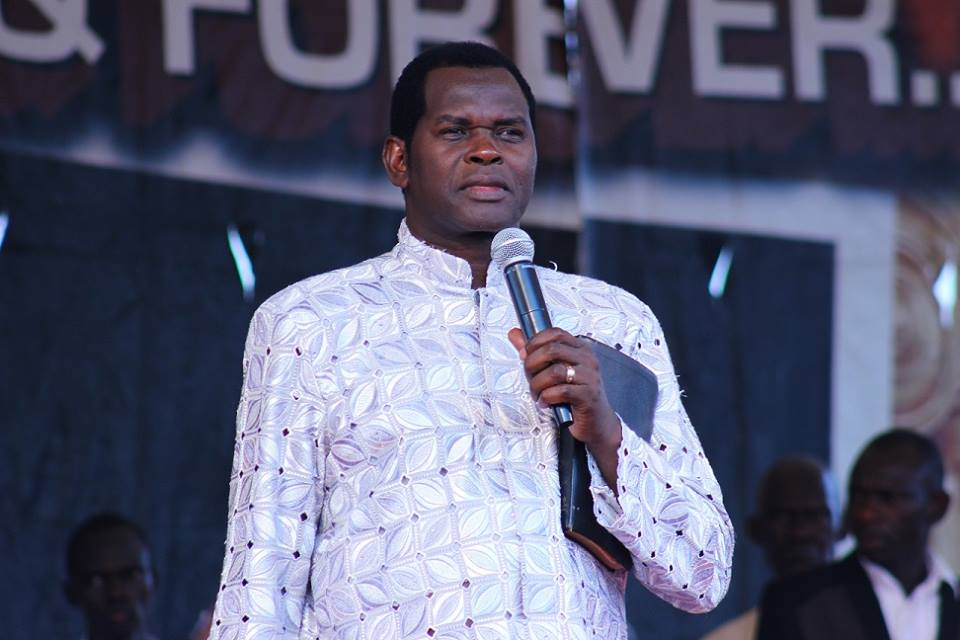
- Kayanja at Miracle Center Cathedral
- Born: Masooli, Gayaza Uganda
- Occupations: Pastor; author; motivational speaker
- Spouse: Jessica Kayanja
- Children: 3
- Website: robertkayanjaministries.org

Robert Kayanja (born January 24th 1962) is the founder and senior pastor of the Miracle Centre Cathedral, a megachurch in Kampala. He also is the founder and CEO of a Christian television channel, Channel 44 Television (Miracle Ltd).

== Ministry ==
Kayanja started the Miracle Centre as a papyrus reed structure, together with a few other young ministers. Today it is among the region's largest church buildings, accommodating over 10,000 people. He is also overseer of the Miracle Bible College, the Never Again Children's project and the Kapeeka orphanage. He is the director of Miracle Television and a frequent speaker on Daystar Television Network. The church has also founded over 1,000 Miracle Centre churches across the country.

Kayanja encourages his congregation to prosper and use their wealth to serve God and help others.

He is the chairman of AfriAid.

== Philanthropy ==
President Yoweri Museveni paid tribute to Kayanja and General Salim Saleh for spearheading food aid to South Sudan.

"I congratulate the congregation and General Saleh for having the noble idea of helping our brothers and sisters in South Sudan who are in need," he said. He observed that they have made the aid in line with the teachings in the Bible that require man to love his neighbor as he loves himself. He said that they were making the right move in standing by our brothers in South Sudan.

Senior Presidential advisor on military affairs, General Salim Saleh, along with Kampala businessmen under the umbrella organization Afri-Aid, have raised sh300m to buy food for people in war-ravaged South Sudan. Saleh explained that before the fundraising drive for the people of South Sudan, Kampala business woman Esther Mpumuza approached him and advised that there was need to pray for the people of South Sudan and also mobilize financial support for them.

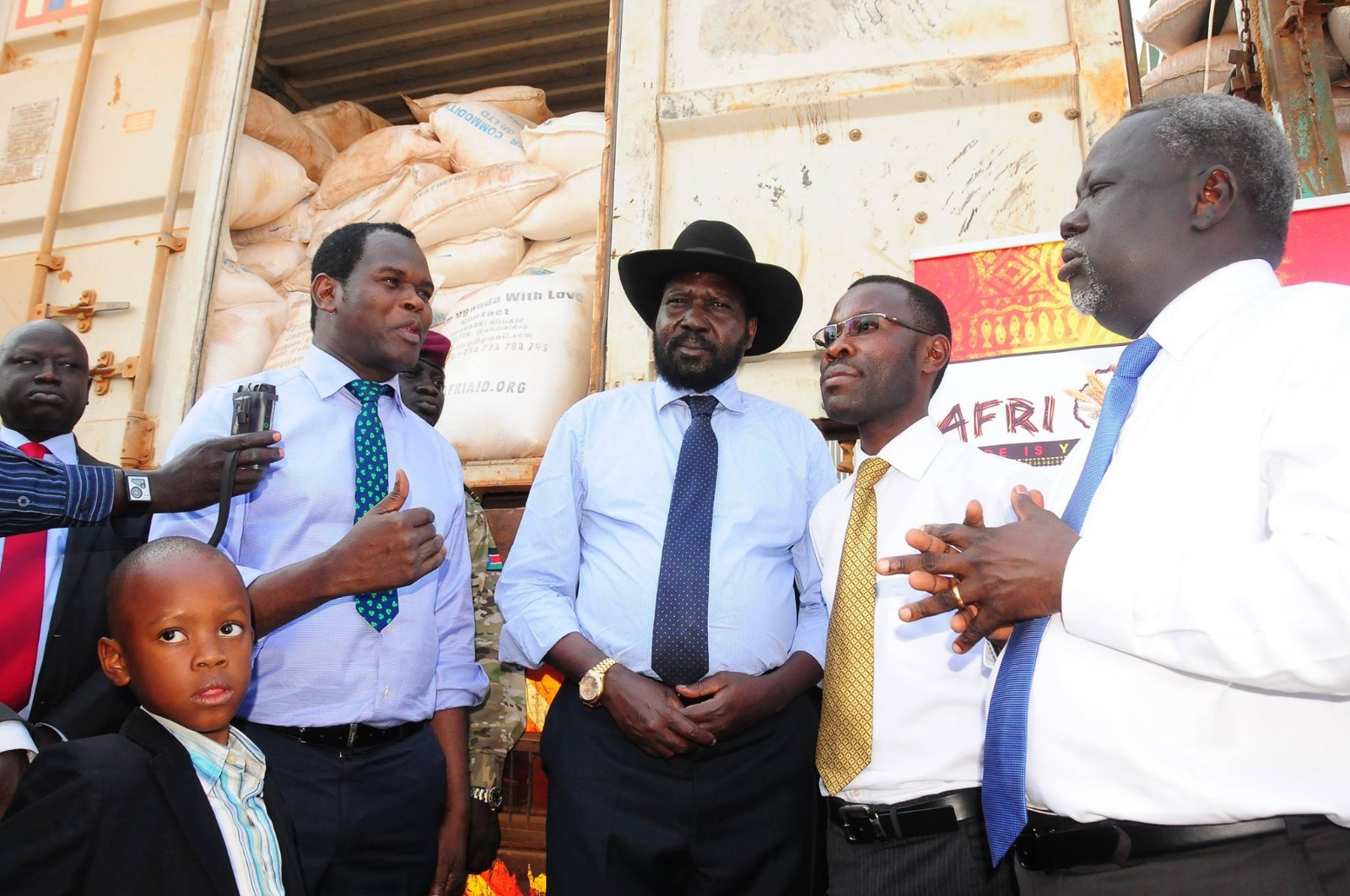
Kayanja in South Sudan

As chairman of Afri-Aid, Kayanja said, "This is the time for Africans to bring whatever you have so that we can support our people who are living a bad life in South Sudan. As the chairman of Afri-aid I have to make sure Ugandans raise sh2b to buy food for the people in South Sudan."

== Criticism and controversy ==
On 31 December 2005, Kayanja prophesied that one of the presidential election candidates would die. MPs expressed concern, but this did not happen before the election.

In 2006 he was criticised for amassing wealth and building a palace at Gaba, a suburb of Kampala on the shore of Lake Victoria. Kayanja told critics to mind their own business, saying that the grand house was a marriage gift to his wife.

=== False accusations of sexual assault ===
In May 2009, 6 alleged victims claimed to have been raped by Kayanja. After a police investigation, the 6 young men withdrew their accusations and claimed to have received a sum of money to claim that they had been raped by Kayanja. In August 2009, the police confirmed the results of their investigation and decided to charge six other pastors with defamation. In October 2012, they were found guilty of defamation aimed at discrediting the reputation of Kayanja, were fined one million shillings each (approximately US$390) and sentenced to one hundred hours of community service. After a rejected appeal, the conviction was upheld in the High Court of Justice in February 2014. In December 2016, Musasizi Robert, popularly known as Mukisa, who had been the principal witness in the 2009 case, went to Miracle Centre Cathedral and publicly confessed to having been used as a puppet by some pastors and legal practitioners in making false accusations against Kayanja. Kayanja forgave and blessed him.

== Personal and family life ==
Kayanja resides in Kampala with his wife Jessica Kayanja, son Robert Kayanja Jr. and twin daughters Kirstein and Kristiana. Kristiana survived brain cancer in 2004. Pastor Kayanja is the younger brother of the former Anglican Archbishop of York, John Sentamu, and of David Makumbi, a bishop in a Ugandan church.

== Awards ==
In 2007, Kayanja won the VIGA Merit Award.

Kayanja won the Worldsavers Man of the Year Award in 2014.

== See also ==
- Amos Okot
- Jessica Kayanja
