= CSBAG =

Ugandan nonprofit organization

Civil Society Budget Advocacy Group
- Abbreviation: CSBAG
- Formation: 2004 (11 years)
- Type: Nonprofit organization
- Purpose: Finance
- Location: Kampala, Uganda
- Region served: Uganda (Sheema, Kibaale, Agago, Abim and Kibaale districts)
- Members: 75 CSOs
- Official language: English
- Coordinator: Julius Mukunda
- Website: Homepage; Official blog

The Civil Society Budget Advocacy Group (CSBAG) is a Ugandan nonprofit organization that was founded in 2004 to bring together Civil Society Organizations (CSOs) at national and district levels with the view of influencing government decisions on resource mobilization and utilization for equitable and sustainable development.

Since its inception, CSBAG has influenced the budgetary process in Uganda by ensuring that both local and national budgets incorporate views of the poor and that they are gender sensitive.

== History ==
CSBAG was formed in 2004 by a group of Non Governmental Organisations led by Uganda Debt Network (UDN), Uganda National NGO Forum (UNNGOF), Forum for Women in Democracy (FOWODE) and Oxfam GB in Uganda.

The coalition was created out of the desire to collectively influence government policies and effectively participate in the setting of national budget priorities in close collaboration with the Ministry of Finance, Planning and Economic Development (MoFPED).

In 2013, the CSO group was nominated to the steering committee on budget transparency by the MoFPED.

In 2014, CSBAG was admitted to two government sector working groups: the Accountability Sector Working Group and the Works and Transport Sector Working Group.

== Function ==
Vision

The CSBAG vision is: A Uganda with a people centered budget that dignifies humanity.

Mission

The CSBAG mission is: Working towards ensuring that resource mobilization, allocation and utilization is inclusive for a transformed Uganda.

Objectives

The main objectives of CSBAG are to:

- Influence Government decisions on resource mobilization and utilization for equitable and sustainable development.
- Advocate for increased transparency and accountability in national priorities, financing and public spending at all levels.
- Build and strengthen the capacity of CSBAG to carry out its mandate.

Activities

The core activities of CSBAG are to:

- Build capacities of citizens and CSOs to effectively engage with economic policies and budgets that meet their needs.
- Mobilize and organize for meaningful citizens' participation in budgeting processes and stimulate grassroots-led accountability.
- Maintain dialogue with the Government to ensure that fiscal policies and budgeting processes are pro-poor, gender sensitive and sustainable.
- Conduct extensive research on budgets and policies to enhance CSBAG's ability to influence budget decisions.
- Create awareness and public understanding of budget related matters to demystify the budget discourse.

Focus Districts

CSBAG's focus district areas of operation are; Sheema, Kibaale, Agago, Abim and Kibaale.

== Membership ==
As of June 2015, the coalition had nearly 78 member Civil Society Organizations that include among others the following:

1. Action Aid International Uganda (AA - IU)
2. Forum for Women in Democracy (FOWODE)
3. Uganda Debt Network (UDN)
4. Uganda Women's Network (UWONET)
5. Advance Africa
6. African Center for Trade and Development (ACTADE)
7. Ashah Razyn Foundation (ARF)
8. Abim Women Together In Development (AWOTID)
9. Advocates Coalition for Development and Environment (ACODE)
10. Uganda National NGO Forum (UNNGOF)
11. Participatory Ecological Land Use Management (PELUM) Uganda
12. African Center for Treatment and Rehabilitation of Torture Victims (ACTV)
13. Anti Corruption Coalition Uganda (ACCU)
14. Uganda Road Sector Support Initiative (URRSI)
15. Volunteer Efforts for Development Concerns (VEDCO)
16. Center for Women in Governance (CEWIGO)
17. Women and Girl Child Development Association (WEDGA)
18. Human Rights Network Uganda (HURINET-U)
19. Uganda Network of AIDS Service Organisation (UNASO)
20. Southern and Eastern African Trade Information & Negotiations Institute Uganda (SEATINI-U)
21. Environmental Alert (EA)
22. National Union of Women with Disabilities of Uganda (NUWODU)
23. Development Research Training (DRT)
24. WaterAid (WA)
25. African Youth Development Link (AYDL)
26. Regional Associates for Community Initiatives (RACI)
27. African Women's Economic Policy Network (AWEPON)
28. Action Group for Health, HR and HIV & AIDS (AGHA)
29. Center for Domestic Violence Prevention (CEDOVIP)
30. Hope After Rape (HAR)
31. Platform for Citizen Participation and Accountability (PLACA)
32. Eastern and Southern Africa Small Scale Farmers Forum (ESAFF)
33. Jenga Afrika
34. Deutsche Stiftung Weltbevölkerung Uganda (DSW-U)
35. Caritas Kampala (CK)
36. Development Network of Indigenous Voluntary Associations (DENIVA)
37. Hunger Fighters Uganda
38. Food Rights Alliance (FRA)
39. FOWODE Young Leaders Alumni Association (FYLAA)
40. Forum for Kalongo Parish Women Association (FOKAPAWA)
41. Initiative for Social and Economic Rights Uganda (ISER)
42. Isis-Women International Cross Cultural Exchange (WICCE)
43. Institute of Social Transformation (IST)
44. Uganda Women Entrepreneurs Association Limited (UWEAL)
45. Uganda Youth Network (UYONET)
46. National Union of Disabled Persons Uganda (NUDIPU)
47. National Association of Women Organisations in Uganda (NAWOU)
48. Uganda National Health Consumers' Organisation (UNHCO)
49. Uganda Joint Christian Council (UJCC)
50. Toro Development Network (ToroDev)

== See also ==
- Economy of Uganda
- Ministry of Finance, Planning and Economic Development
- Corruption in Uganda
