= Polly Namaye =

Ugandan police officer

Commissioner of Police Polly Namaye Bangambaki
- Born: 1984 (age 41–42); Kabale, Uganda
- Citizenship: Ugandan
- Education: Maryhill High School, Bweranyangi Girls' Senior Secondary School (High School Diploma); Makerere University (Bachelor of Arts in Education) (Master of Arts in Journalism and Communication); Uganda Management Institute (Postgraduate Diploma in Human Resource Management) (Masters in Management Studies)
- Occupation: Police officer
- Years active: 2007–present
- Title: Commissioner, Peace Support Operations at the Uganda Police Force
- Spouse: Alfred Bangambaki

Polly Namaye Bangambaki (née Polly Namaye) is a Ugandan communications professional, teacher and policewoman who serves as the commissioner responsible for Peace Support Operations at the Uganda Police Force, effective August 2024. From 2014 until August 2024, she was the Deputy Spokesperson for the Uganda Police Force.

== Background and education ==
Namaye was born in Kabale District, in the Western Region of Uganda, to David Kabalega and Anne Kabalega.

She attended Kabale Primary School before she transferred to Maryhill High School, an all-girls boarding secondary school in the city of Mbarara for O-level studies. She completed her A-Level education at Bweranyangi Girls' Senior Secondary School, in Bushenyi, graduating with a high school diploma.

Her first degree, a Bachelor of Arts in Education, was awarded by Makerere University, Uganda's oldest and largest public university. She obtained a postgraduate diploma in Human Resources Management from the Uganda Management Institute. Her second degree, a Master of Arts in Journalism and Communication, was awarded by Makerere University in 2019.

== Career ==
Namaye worked as a school teacher in Kyenjojo District for six months, until September 2007. She then switched careers and became a policewoman in 2007. Her basic police training, which involved academics, the law and internship, lasted until December 2008.

From January 2009 until April 2014, at the rank of senior superintendent of police, she served as the regional police spokesperson for Mbarara Municipality. In April 2014, she was transferred to police head office in the Office of the Commissioner of Police. There, at the rank of acting assistant commissioner of police, she was appointed the deputy-in-command for the Press and Public Relations Office.

In 2016, Namaye was promoted to the rank of assistant commissioner of police. As of 2023, she was a commissioner of police and a deputy spokesperson of the Uganda Police Force.

== Personal life ==
Namaye is married to Alfred Bangambaki, and they are the parents of two children.

== See also ==
- Elizabeth Muwanga
- Tumuheirwe Florence
- Olivia Wawire
