= Mbala =

Mbala may refer to:

== Culture ==
- Mbala people, an ethnic group of the Democratic Republic of Congo
- Mbala language, spoken by the Mbala

== People ==
- Mbala Mbuta Biscotte (b. 1985), Congolese footballer
- David Mbala (b. 1993), Congolese footballer
- Yves Mekongo Mbala (b. 1987), Cameroonian basketball player

== Places ==
- Mbala Kingdom, a kingdom in part of what is now Angola in 1600
- Mbala, Cameroon
- Mbala, Zambia
- Mbala District, Zambia
- Mbala Airport, Zambia

== See also ==
- M'Bala
