= Rita Aciro =

Ugandan activist

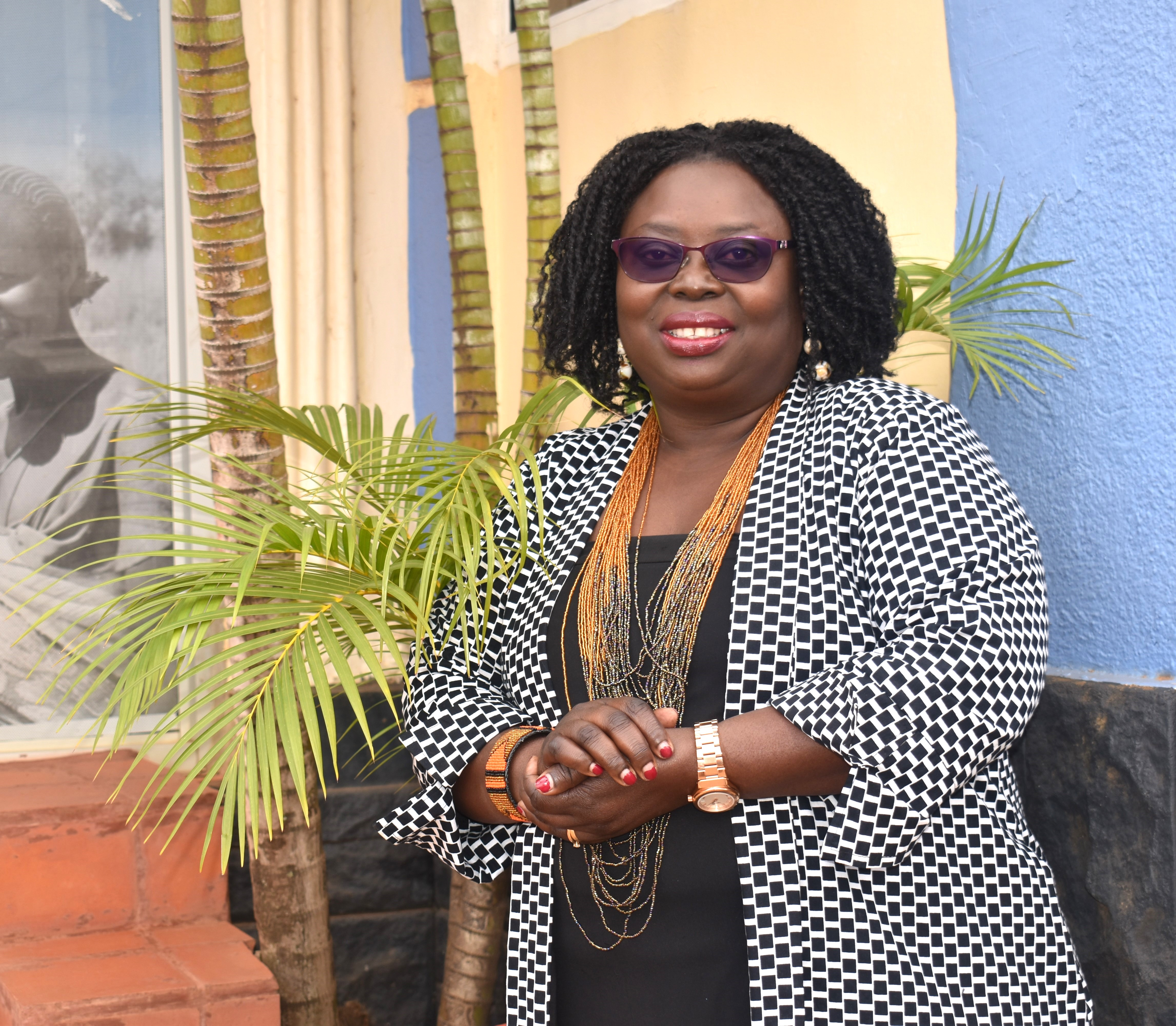
- Occupation: Executive director of Uganda Women's Network
- Awards: European Union Human Rights Defenders Award; 2021
- Website: www.uwonet.or.ug

Rita Aciro is a Ugandan human rights defender and the executive director of Uganda Women's Network (UWONET). She was the recipient of the 2021 European Union Human Rights Defenders Award.

== Background and education ==
Aciro attended Reparatrix Boarding School in Bugonga, Entebbe, before moving on to Kololo Secondary School. She joined UWONET as an intern in 1997.

== Career ==
In 2014, activists allege that Aciro had been arrested, but government officials denied the claim while acknowledging her detention. Aciro later served as the chairperson of National Election Watch, a coalition of 60 organizations that monitor elections across Uganda.

Throughout her career, Aciro has worked with communities and governments in East Africa on issues concerning women's leadership, women's land rights, combating gender-based violence, women-led peacebuilding, and civic and voter education. With over 20 years of experience, she has remained at the forefront of advocacy and campaigning for the rights of women and girls. In 2021, she received the European Union Human Rights Defenders Award, which honors individuals for their contribution to women's rights and the promotion of human rights and democratic values in Uganda.

== See also ==
- Jimmy Spire Ssentongo
- Tumuheirwe Florence
- Stella Nyanzi
- Agather Atuhaire
