= Uganda Women's Network =

NGO body

Uganda Women’s Network
- Abbreviation: UWONET
- Formation: 1993
- Legal status: Non-governmental organization
- Purpose: To advocate for gender equality in Uganda
- Location: Kampala, Uganda
- Region served: East Africa
- Members: 16 Civil society organizations
- Executive Director: Rita H. Aciro-Lakor
- Affiliations: Uganda National NGO Forum; Uganda Debt Network; Anti-Corruption Coalition Uganda; Uganda Land Alliance; FEMNET; SOAWR; Network of Ugandan Researchers and Research Users; Mwelekeo WA NGO; The NGO Coalition for East Africa; Eastern African Sub-regional Support Initiative for the Advancement of Women
- Website: http://uwonet.or.ug/

The Uganda Women's Network (UWONET) is a Ugandan non-governmental organization (NGO) working to advance public policy regarding women's rights. It is an umbrella organisation of national women's NGOs and individuals operating in East Africa. The executive director is Rita H. Aciro-Lakor.

== History ==
UWONET was created after the 1993 East African Women's Conference, held in Kampala, Uganda, in preparation for the United Nations Fourth World Conference on Women in 1995.

=== 1998 Land Act ===
During the early part of the twenty-first century, women in East Africa provided 85 per cent of the agricultural work, yet owned only 7 percent of the land. Many women's rights organizations and individuals, disillusioned by groups that were not bringing women into the political process, started turning to UWONET – especially their campaign for land reform, which started in 1995. UWONET, in conjunction with the Uganda Land Alliance, lobbied Parliament in 1998 about women's right to inherit land in Uganda. In 1998, the Land Act was passed with provisions for women's rights. This campaign set a precedent for women in Uganda to "work together and to respond to issues in a more timely and aggressive way."

=== People's Manifesto ===
In 2000, UWONET published "People's Manifesto", which took on the topics of internal reform in UWONET and also the "need to develop means of incorporating women's concerns" to the leadership level in Uganda. In the run-up to the Ugandan 2001 presidential and parliamentary elections, UWONET spearheaded an initiative that took steps towards challenging the lack of internal democracy in the Movement Government. Together with like-minded organizations, UWONET put together a 26-page manifesto known as the "People's Manifesto" to highlight the people's rights and lack thereof to aspiring presidential candidates. They also published the manifesto to "let parliamentary candidates in the 2002 March elections know the demands that women wanted addressed."

=== Women's Manifesto ===
In 2015, UWONET, together with other organisations under The Women's Democracy Group, launched a political document, "The Women's Manifesto 2016–2021", which set out demands taken from a cross section of women in both rural and urban areas. Among other things, the document made five major demands: the betterment of women's health, land and property rights, education, economic empowerment, and decision-making in politics.

== Function ==
UWONET coordinates "collective action" among its members to attain gender equality in Uganda. Since UWONET was founded, women have been contributing more economically and have won land rights from the 1998 Land Act. According to director Lakor, however, there is still a long way to go to reach gender equality.

=== Programme areas ===
UWONET'S activities are implemented under four thematic areas; namely:

- Economic justice and empowerment. Under this programme area, UWONET seeks to: advocate for gender-responsive trade policies; advocate for increased women's access, ownership, and control of economic resources; and, strengthen society's capacity to demand gender-responsive policies for equitable national resource allocation.
- Rights and access to justice. The strategic objectives of this component are to advocate for the implementation of laws and programmes that protect women's human rights and reproductive health rights.
- Leadership and democratic governance. The strategic objectives of this component are to: enhance the capacity of women leaders at national and district levels to engage in decision-making, advocate for an increased women's participation in leadership and democratic governance, and strengthen the capacity of civil society on social accountability and constitutionalism.
- Institutional development and organisational strengthening. Under this programme area, UWONET seeks to: develop and implement effective mechanisms for institutional governance and increase visibility of the network's interventions.

== Membership ==
The network was founded by nine members but has grown to be composed of sixteen women's organisations and nine individual activists. These include:

- Action for Development
- Association of Uganda Women Medical Doctors
- Association of Uganda Women Lawyers
- Centre for Domestic Violence Prevention
- Community Development Resource Network
- Department of Women and Gender Studies at Makerere University
- Disabled Women's Network and Resource Organization
- Empower Children and Communities Against Abuse
- Forum for Women in Democracy
- Women of Uganda Network (WOUGNET)
- Isis Women's International Cross-Cultural Exchange
- National Bahai Committee for the Advancement of Women
- Send a Cow Uganda
- Slum Aid Project
- Uganda Media Women's Association
- Uganda Women's Trust
- Women Engineers, Technicians and Scientists in Uganda

== See also ==
- Forum of Women's NGOs
- World Social Forum
- Sister Namibia
