= Olivia Wawire =

Ugandan civil servant

Olivia Wawire (born on 8 February 1960) also known as Olivia Rosemary Nagudi Wawire is a Ugandan civil servant currently working at Uganda police. She became the first female fire brigade officer in 1981 and became the third in command in the Uganda Police Fire Brigade which led to her appointment as the Regional Fire Officer.

== Personal and education life ==
She was born on 8 February 1960 in Ruwalasi sub county, Budadiri in Bugusege Bukameme village in Sironko district. She attended her primary education at Namburu primary school and later joined St Andrew College Tororo for her Uganda Certificate of Education (UCE). However, before completing her UCE, she joined the Uganda Police Force due to lack of school fees and later returned to school to complete her UCE in 2005 at Jinja Parents College. Olivia attended her Uganda Advanced Certificate of Education (UACE) at Njeru Secondary school in 2007. In 2017, she obtained a Bachelors of Social Works and Social Administration from Kabale University.

== Work history ==
Olivia served as the Regional Police Commander of Jinja and Kitegezi region in Southwestern between 2009 and 2015 and worked in Fire Brigade as the only female for the Community Liaison Officer in the Child and Family Protection Unit.In 2006, during the general elections, she served as the Acting District Police Commander for Jinja for four months. She was the senior Superintendent of Uganda Police and was later promoted to Commissioner of Police. She also served as the member of the standby police court, a disciplinary tribunal which is the second highest ranking position in the court. She worked as the Deputy Chief Political Commissar.

== See also ==
- Uganda Police Force
- Shaban Ramadhan Mubaje
- Tumuheirwe Florence
- Elizabeth Muwanga Alamo
