= Educ'France =

Educ'France is a French educational association and website.

== Description ==
Educ'France is a civil society organisation, a player active on the web, which offers a dynamic reflection, without bias and outside the French bureaucracy.

In the context of the coronavirus, the newspaper Le Monde praised the legal and practical monitoring carried out by Educ'France to help parents to carry out schooling at home, schools being closed due to containment.

Educ'France opposes Emmanuel Macron's proposal to abolish home schooling.,

Axelle Girard is the director of Educ'France.

== History ==
Educ'France was started at the end of 2019 and is linked to fr:Anne Coffinier, a Frenchwoman who invests in private schools. Axelle Girard has been the director since 2020.
