= Suzie Muwanga =

Ugandan academician, administrator, researcher and political scientist

Dr. Suzie Nansozi Muwanga
- Other names: Nansozi K. Muwanga
- Citizenship: Uganda
- Education: PhD in Political Science (University of Toronto); Bachelor Honors in Political Science (London University); Master’s Degree in Area Studies (London University)
- Occupation(s): academician, administrator, researcher
- Organization: Julius Nyerere Leadership Centre
- Parents: Paulo Muwanga (father); Kasalina Zawedde Muwanga (mother)
- Awards: The Rockefeller Foundation – African Dissertation Internship Award (ADIA)

Suzie Nansozi Muwanga is a Ugandan academician, administrator, researcher and political scientist. She is the executive director of the Julius Nyerere Leadership Centre (JNLC). She is a former head for the Makerere University department of political science and public administration. She is a Fulbright New Century Scholar (NCS).

== Early life and education ==
Nansozi is a daughter to the late president of Uganda Paul Muwanga and late Nalongo Kasalina Zawedde Muwanga, who died in 2024.

Nansozi holds a PhD in political science from the University of Toronto. She holds a bachelor honours in Political Science and a Master’s degree in Area Studies from London University. She holds an advanced post graduate diploma in International Relations and Development from the Institute of Social Studies (ISS). She holds a bachelor of Arts in political science at Makerere University. She received the Rockefeller Foundation – African Dissertation Internship Award (ADIA) for her PhD research titled "The Politics of Primary Education in Uganda: Parent Participation and National Reforms".

== Career ==
Nansozi lectured at Makerere University in the Department of Political Science and Public Administration. She coordinated the UNDP’s rule of law and constitutional democracy project in the department. She is the executive director of the Julius Nyerere Leadership Centre (JNLC). She organized and moderated the Uganda's presidential debate in 2016. She is a member of the scientific Committee of the council for the Development of Social Science Research in Africa (CODESRIA), Senegal. She worked as researcher and consultant for organisations and agencies that include; the African Development Bank, Hewlett Foundation and Flora Family Foundation, Mountain View California, The World Bank, UNICEF and Irish Aid. She mentors the educationally disadvantaged girls and also advocates for the delivery of quality education at different levels and national contexts at Forum for African Women Educationists (FAWE).

== Awards ==
- The Rockefeller Foundation – African Dissertation Internship Award (ADIA).

== Publications ==
- Public Expenditure Governance in Uganda's Education Sector:Application of An Innovative Assessment Framework.
- Reviewing the Form and Substance of the 2021 Elections.
- The Politics of Higher Education Reform: The Case of Makerere University.
- Owning Our Urban Future: The Case of Kampala City.
- Inclusion as Political Mobilisation: The Political Economy of Quality Education Initiatives In Uganda.
- Public Expenditure Governance in Uganda’s Education Sector: Application of an Innovative Assessment Framework.

== Read also ==
- Joy Kwesiga
- Elizabeth Muwanga
