= Sarah Mukasa =

Pan-African feminist, feminist philanthropist, social justice leader, and organiser

- Born: June 1963 (age 63); Uganda
- Education: University of East London (BA Business and Management); London School of Economics and Political Science (MSc NGO Management)
- Occupations: Feminist philanthropy leader, social justice advocate, pan‑African feminist
- Organizations: Open Society–Africa (Division Director, Women’s Rights); Open Society Initiative for Eastern Africa (Deputy Director); African Women’s Development Fund (Director of Programmes); Akina Mama wa Afrika (Programme Manager, East Africa)
- Known for: Leadership in women’s rights, philanthropy, NGO management, and feminist organising

Sarah Mukasa (born, June 1963) is a Ugandan feminist, philanthropist, social justice leader, and speaker on leadership and management in the not-for-profit sector in Africa and Europe.

== Personal and educational background ==
Mukasa was born in Uganda after independence.

Mukasa has a Bachelor of Arts in Business and Management from the University of East London and a Master of Science in Non Governmental Organisation (NGO) Management from the London School of Economics and Political Science.

== Professional career ==
She was the Division Director for Women’s Rights at Open Society-Africa until January 2024. While at the Open Society Africa, she led the development of programs that address gender justice looking at the intersections of race, ethnicity, age, class, disability, sexual orientation and gender identity.

She also worked at the Open Society Initiative for Eastern Africa as the Deputy Director, where she developed the first gender justice strategy and dedicated funding stream. She worked as the Director of Programmes at the African Women’s Development Fund where she was based in Accra, Ghana. Sarah has also worked with Ford Foundation, DANIDA, Concern Worldwide, Action Aid International and the Judicial Services Commission of Uganda at consultancy levels. She worked at Akina Mama wa Afrika as the Progammes Manager for East Africa.

She attended a press briefing in Kampala on Monday 23 March, 2026 alongside fellow activist rejecting government accusations labeling Civil Society Organizations (CSOs) and non-governmental organizations (NGOs) as “terrorists” or agents of foreign interests. This included push back by the Civil Society Organizations (CSOs) and non-governmental organizations (NGOs) activists including Sarah Mukasa, Sarah Bireete, Andrew Karamagi, and Job Kiija who pushed back against proposed government measures to regulate funding and accreditation of non-governmental organizations which will shrink civic space and undermine constitutional freedoms.

Her participation at the UN included the coordination of the advocacy strategies for women’s interest groups such as the African Women’s Caucus, and the Solidarity for African Women’s Rights, a campaign for the ratification and implementation of the Protocol to the African Charter on Human and People’s Rights on the Rights of Women in Africa. She is a member of the Working Group of the African Feminist Forum. Sarah also served as the board member of the Center for African Philanthropy. She is African feminist organiser.

== See also ==
- Jessica Horn
- Non-governmental organization
- Bisi Adeleye-Fayemi
- CSBAG
- Amina Doherty
- Jacqueline Asiimwe
