= Ssentongo =

Ssentongo is a surname. Notable people with the surname include:

- Dickson Ssentongo (1981–2010), Ugandan radio journalist
- Henry Ssentongo (1936–2019), Ugandan Roman Catholic priest
- Jimmy Spire Ssentongo (born 1979), Ugandan professor
- Moses Ddiba Ssentongo, Ugandan military officer
- Nabulya Theopista Ssentongo (born 1951), Ugandan politician
- Robert Ssentongo (footballer) (born 1988), Ugandan footballer
- Robert Ssentongo (surgeon), Ugandan plastic surgeon
