= MMQ =

MMQ or mmq may refer to:

- Methylmethaqualone, a chemical compound
- MMQ, the IATA code for Mbala Airport, Zambia
- mmq, the ISO 639-3 code for Aisi language, Papua New Guinea
- Modern Mandolin Quartet, a chamber music group from California
