= Emma Boona =

Ugandan teacher and politician (born 1954)

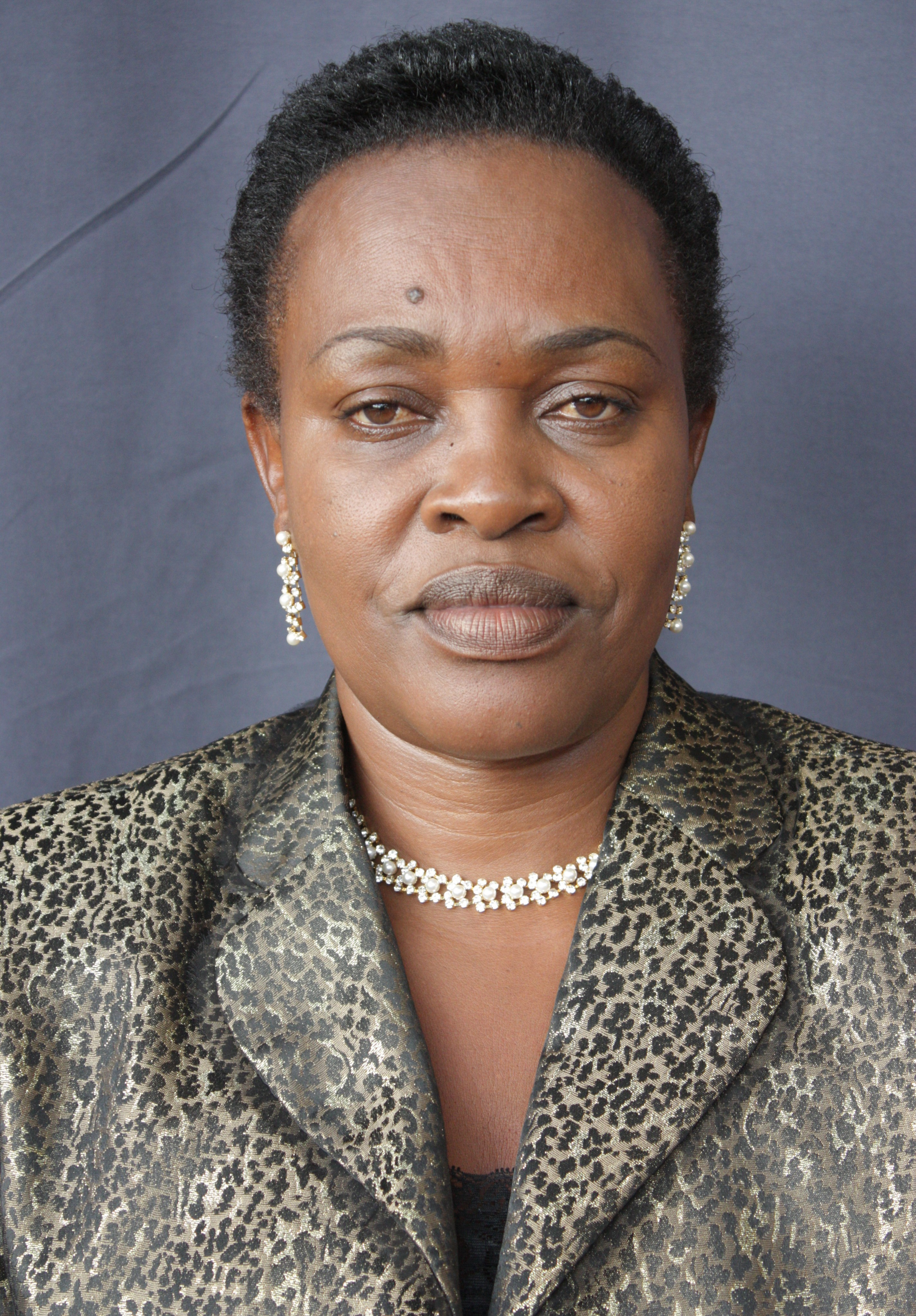
- Emma Boona in 2011

Honorable

Personal details
- Born: Emma Boona; 17 February 1954 (age 72) Mbarara, Uganda
- Citizenship: Uganda
- Spouse: Chris Boona
- Education: Makerere University; Mbarara University of Science and Technology
- Occupation: Teacher, politician
- Known for: Teaching, politics

Emma Boona (born 17 February 1954) is a Ugandan teacher, public administrator and politician. She is the former woman representative for Mbarara District in the 8th & 9th parliaments and is a member of the National Resistance Movement (NRM), the ruling political party in Uganda.

During her time in the legislative body, she served as the vice chairperson of the Public Service & Local Government Committee and as a member of both the Committee on Finance, Planning and Economic Development and the Public Accounts Committee. She was also a member of the NRM Parliamentary Caucus and the Uganda Women's Parliamentary Association (UWOPA).

Boona is also a former Local Council Five (LC5) vice chairperson for Mbarara District, deputy mayor for Mbarara Municipality, headteacher for Mbarara Secondary School and was a humanities and social sciences teacher in various secondary schools in Western Uganda earlier on in her career.

== Early life and education ==
Boona was born in Bushenyi, Ankole sub-region, on 17 February 1954 in a Christian family of the Banyankole. She had her primary education at St. Cecilia Girls' School Kitabi-Bushenyi and St. Helen's Primary School – Mbarara, acquiring a PLE certification in 1967.

She then attended Maryhill High School for her O-Level education and Trinity College Nabbingo for her A-Level education, attaining a UCE certification in 1971 and an UACE certification in 1973.

Boona further advanced to Makerere University where she attained a Bachelor of Arts with a Diploma in Education in 1977. In 2006, she acquired a Master's degree in Planning & Management of Education from Mbarara University of Science and Technology (MUST).

== Career and politics ==
Upon attaining a bachelor's degree in 1977, Boona taught humanities and social sciences in various secondary schools in Western Uganda up until 1984 when she was appointed headteacher for Mbarara Secondary School where she was the top administrator for fourteen years. In 1991, she became the deputy mayor for Mbarara Municipality and served in that capacity up until 1998 when she was elected LC5 vice chairperson for Mbarara District.

From 2002 to 2008, she represented Uganda in the International Planned Parenthood Federation – Africa Region (IPPFAR) as a Reproductive Health Uganda (RHU) senior volunteer.

In 2006, Boona continued to serve the people of Mbarara albeit in a different capacity, she bid for the Mbarara District Woman Representative seat on the NRM ticket and won both the party's primaries in 2005 and the general elections in 2006 to become a member of the 8th Parliament for the Pearl of Africa. In 2011, she was reelected by the constituents of Mbarara for another five-year term but lost out to Rosette Kajungu Mutambi in the 2015 NRM party primary elections in her third attempt to represent the constituency.

In the 8th and 9th parliaments, Boona was a member of the Committee on Finance, Planning and Economic Development and the Public Accounts Committee. She was also a member of the NRM Parliamentary Caucus and the Uganda Women's Parliamentary Association (UWOPA). In the 8th parliament, she served as the vice chairperson of the Public Service & Local Governments Committee and also represented Uganda's Western Region in UWOPA.

== Personal life ==
Emma Boona is married to Chris Boona and they have a number of children. She is a patron and mentor of various Savings and Credit Cooperative Organizations (SACCOs) in Mbarara District and serves on a number of school boards.

== See also ==
- Parliament of Uganda
- Ankole
