= Authority for Civil Society Organizations =

Ethiopian government regulator of civil society organisations

Agency overview
- Formed: 2019
- Preceding agency: Charities and Societies Agency
- Jurisdiction: Government of Ethiopia
- Headquarters: Addis Ababa
- Website: acso.gov.et

The Authority for Civil Society Organizations (ACSO) is the federal government body of Ethiopia responsible for the registration, support, monitoring and supervision of civil society organizations (CSOs). It operates under the Organizations of Civil Societies Proclamation No. 1113/2019 and is led by a board of directors.

== Background ==
In 2009, the Charities and Societies Agency was established under the Charities and Societies Proclamation No. 621/2009. It gave the regulator the statewide discretion to refuse registration and to control the funding and activities of CSOs. Following the political reforms that began in 2018, the 2009 law was repealed and replaced by the 2019 Proclamation, which established ACSO as a regulator with a narrower mandate and introduced provisions allowing CSOs to self-regulate through a sector-wide council. International observers generally welcomed the 2019 reform as a corrective to the 2009 law, and ACSO oversaw a large wave of re-registrations and new CSO registrations in the years that followed.

== Mandate ==
Under the 2019 Proclamation, ACSO registers and re-registers CSOs and monitors their compliance with the law, including provisions that cap administrative costs and restrict election-related activity by foreign and foreign-funded organisations. Its board of directors sets policy direction, hears appeals on registration decisions and issues implementing directives. The authority's institutional transformation has been supported by international partners, including the Agence française de développement.

== Proposed 2025 amendments ==
In 2025 the Ethiopian government circulated draft amendments to the 2019 Proclamation that would expand ACSO's powers, including broader suspension and asset-freeze powers, tighter restrictions on foreign and diaspora funding for governance and election-related work, reduced civil-society representation on the regulator's board, and the removal of independent judicial appeal from ACSO decisions. Human rights organisations, including the Observatory for the Protection of Human Rights Defenders (a joint programme of the International Federation for Human Rights and the World Organisation Against Torture), warned that the proposals would significantly restrict the independence and operation of civil society in Ethiopia.
