= UN Women Ethiopia =

UN_WOMEN_Logo

UN Women Ethiopia Country Office (ECO) Started functioning in 2012 and has operated as the country office. Collaborative partnerships and joint implementation are the national office's strategy for influencing capacity and resources to affect a significant number of women and girls. ECO collaborates closely with the UN agencies, civil society organizations (CSOs), the Government of Ethiopia (GoE), and other partners.
