= Dickson Ssentongo =

Ugandan journalist

- Born: 3 January 1981; Uganda
- Died: 13 September 2010 (aged 29); Nantabuliriwa, Mukono District, Uganda
- Cause of death: beaten to death with iron bars
- Occupation: Radio journalist
- Years active: 2 years
- Employer: Prime Radio
- Known for: Radio Journalism
- Political party: Democratic Party of Uganda

Dickson Ssentongo (3 January 1981 – 13 September 2010) was a Ugandan radio journalist and news anchor for Prime Radio in Nantabuliriwa, Mukono District, Uganda. He had recently announced his candidacy in upcoming local council elections, running on the opposition Democratic Party ticket.

== Personal ==
Ssentongo was living with his parents in Nantabulirirwa village, which is located in Ggoma sub-county of the Mukono district, in the Central region of Uganda. Ssentongo was a 29-years-old and had no wife or children.

The Ugandan Journalists Association (UJA) held a funeral service for Ssentongo on Friday.

== Career ==
Dickson Ssentongo was a radio journalist for Prime Radio in Nantabuliriwa, Uganda. The radio station is owned by the seventh-day adventist church's Central Ugandan Conference. He regularly read the news bulletins at 7 a.m. in the Luganda language. He was involved in Uganda's Democratic Party, which is the opposition party in Uganda. According to news editors at Prime Radio Ssentongo would occasionally bring up political issues and even tried to promote the Democratic Party. He was also a court assessor for the Mukono High Court and was hoping to be the councilor for Nantabulirirwa Parish at Ggoma sub-county. Ssentongo had joined the church-owned station in 2008 and worked there for two years before his death.

== Death ==
Ssentongo was killed just over 100 miles east of Kampala, the capital of Uganda.

Ssentongo was killed on 13 September 2010 when unidentified men beat him unconscious with metal bars and left him in a pool of blood. Ssentongo was traveling to the radio station on foot around 5 a.m. when the assailants attacked. The radio station was 43 miles from where he was attacked. Police told journalists after the attack that Ssentongo was followed prior to the attack. Ssentongo's phone and wallet were left untouched. The men dragged him nearly 100 meters to a nearby potato garden and left him there to die. He was found by a farmer who tried to help around 9 a.m. Ssentongo could only utter the word "Prime" before falling unconscious. He was taken to the nearby Mukono Health Centre IV, but was unable to receive any treatment there. He was then taken to the Mulago National Referral Hospital. He died twelve hours later before receiving any treatment. The hospital would not treat Ssentongo unless they were given full payment in advance. The family could not pay the 10,000 shillings that were needed for the operation.

Musoni Alphonse, the district police commander of Mukono, said he dispatched a team of police investigators to establish the facts of the case and make arrests. Seven iron bar hitmen were arrested in the Mokono district after the attack. The attackers were picked up by the Violent Crime Crack Unit (VCCU) operatives in just one week. The police arrested one of the suspects, who then disclosed the names of the other suspects. The first suspect was originally released from jail just one month before the attack, where he was locked up for being involved in a robbery. Police say the recovered iron bars and other sharp objects that were used during the attacks.

== Context ==
The Mukono District is known for robbery, theft, domestic violence, defilement, witchcraft, child sacrifice and other crimes. Iron bar crime, which are locally referred to as butayibwa, have led those categories in the recent years. Attacks by iron-bar hit-men have become an epidemic in the Mukono district of Uganda. Justine Nakulima was attacked by iron bar hit men at 5 a.m. on her way to work and survived. Beside pedestrians cyclists are also attacked. Cyclists hired by people pretending to be customers are hit. Nothing is stolen from these victims in most cases. According to Dr. George Kasirye, who is the Medical Officer at the Mukono Health Centre IV, the hospital receives at least two victims of iron-bar crimes every week and some victims never even seek help from the hospital. The problem has also spread to other parts of Uganda. Districts such as Kampala, Wakiso, Hoima, Mbale and others have seen similar attacks happening there. Many do not know why these attacks keep happening or who is behind the attacks. Susani Borgere, a councilor in the Mukono Central Division, thinks the attacks are a major cause of unemployment, drug abuse, and poor police operation in the country.

The iron bar hitmen have injured several people and killed six in the Mukono district all within three weeks. They have mainly targeted motorcycle riders and women who are working in markets. The suspects were charged with murder and robbery, among other crimes. Other victims of the iron bar attacks include Godfrey Gamwanga, a florist in the Mukono district and Saad Kalyango, a teacher at a school in the Mukono district.

== Impact ==
Dickson Ssentongo is one of five journalists killed after 1995 but media who are victims of violence is higher by tenfold annually.

Ssentongo's death was the second death of a journalist in Uganda in the same week. Ssentongo's death was similar to Paul Kiggundo of Masaka-based TOP (Tower of Praise) Radio, who was beaten to death three days earlier by a group of motorcycle taxi drivers in southwest Uganda. The mob claimed that Kiggundo was working for the police after he filmed the mob attacking the house of another driver.

According to the Human Rights Network for Journalists-Uganda (HRNJ), the Ugandan government is failing to uphold press freedom rights. The organization submitted a report to the United Nations urging their United Nations Human Rights Council for failure to protect press freedom rights. The HRNJ says that 50 cases of violence against media members were reported in 2010. The group is asking the government of Uganda to repeal all laws that impede the freedom of the press, expression, opinion and also implementing the decision by the Constitutional Court which overturned the sedition provision and dismiss all sedition charges against journalists. They are also tasking the government to make all reports about murdered journalists and police brutality public.

== Reactions ==
The Prime Radio station sent their condolences to Ssentongo's family and called his death "a very sad moment for the media in Uganda." They called on all media outlets to make safety of their employees their top priority. The station said they will put pressure on the police to bring the perpetrators to justice.

Irina Bokova, director-general of UNESCO, urged authorities to launch a full investigation on the deaths of both Ssentongo and Kiggundu. Bokova said, "I condemn the brutal murder of Dickson Ssentongo. The tragic killings of Mr Ssentongo and freelance journalist Paul Kiggundi three days earlier, sound the alarm for freedom of expression in Uganda and I urge the Ugandan authorities to leave no stone unturned in the efforts to find those responsible for these crimes."
