= Consortium of Christian Relief and Development Associations =

Ethiopian umbrella organisation of NGOs and civil society organisations

- Abbreviation: CCRDA
- Formation: 1973; 53 years ago
- Founded at: Addis Ababa, Ethiopia
- Type: Umbrella organisation
- Purpose: Coordination and capacity-building of NGOs and CSOs
- Headquarters: Addis Ababa, Ethiopia
- Region served: Ethiopia
- Members: 400+ member organisations

The Consortium of Christian Relief and Development Associations (CCRDA), formerly the Christian Relief and Development Association (CRDA), is an Ethiopian non-profit umbrella organisation of non-governmental organizations (NGOs) and civil society organizations (CSOs). Established in 1973, it is the first legally registered association of NGOs in Ethiopia and serves as a membership platform that provides technical, institutional and financial support to its members rather than implementing programmes directly.

== History ==
CCRDA was established in 1973 by thirteen non-governmental organizations to coordinate humanitarian responses to the1973–1974 famine in Ethiopia, which affected regions such as Wollo and Tigray. During this initial period, the organization was formed to manage the crisis and streamline aid distribution, and it subsequently played a major coordination role during the devastating 1984–1985 famine crises as well.

CCRDA gradually expanded its mandate to include long-term development, good governance, and civic engagement. By the early 2000s, it served as the primary umbrella for a significant portion of the country's local and international NGOs, with over 336 organizations registered under its umbrella by 2010.
