= W. F. S. Edwards =

British Army Officer

Brigadier-General W. F. S. Edwards CB CMG DSO KPM
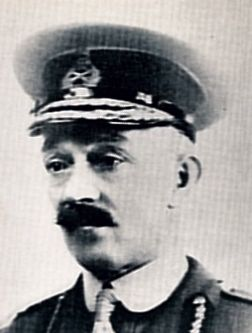
- Born: 27 July 1872; East Budleigh, Devon, England
- Died: 9 January 1941 (aged 68); Exeter, Devon, England
- Military career
- Allegiance: United Kingdom
- Branch: British Army
- Service years: 1897–1922
- Rank: Brigadier-General
- Nickname: The "Mosquito"
- Conflicts: War of the Golden Stool; Second Boer War; First World War
- Awards: Companion of the Order of the Bath; Companion of the Order of St Michael and St George; Distinguished Service Order; King's Police Medal; Mentioned in Despatches; Order of Saint Anna (Russia); Order of Aviz (Portugal)

Brigadier-General William Frederick Savery Edwards, CB, CMG, DSO, KPM (27 July 1872 – 9 January 1941) was a British Army officer who was appointed by the British Colonial Administration as the first Inspector General of the Uganda Protectorate Police, which later became the Uganda Police, and the simultaneous overall commander of the then British East Africa Police. He was the first military member of the colonial British military appointed by the British Crown to lead the Uganda Police Force and the entire law enforcement machinery in British East Africa. When the Uganda Protectorate Police officially became the Uganda police, he was the first duly appointed Inspector General of the same.

== Early life ==
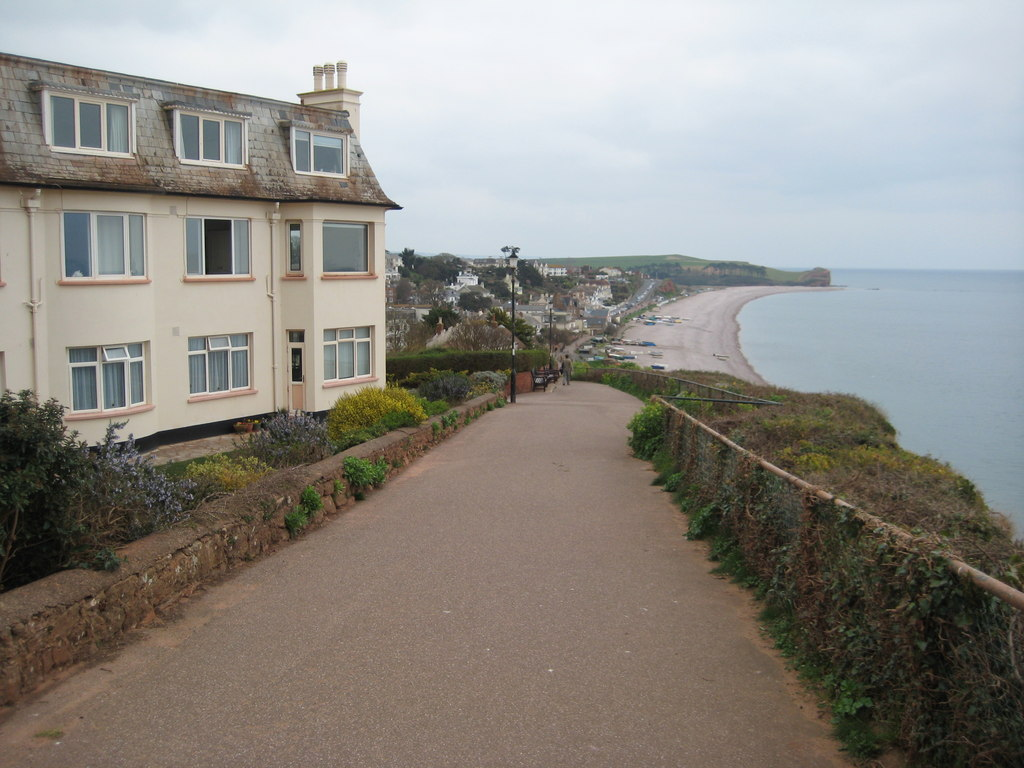
Approaching Budleigh Salterton – geograph.org.uk – 2926902, close to where Edwards was born in East Budleigh, Devon

William Frederick Savery Edwards was the son of Rev. Nathaniel William Edwards.

Edwards was educated at Christ's Hospital, a notable public school with a royal charter, located in Newgate, London.

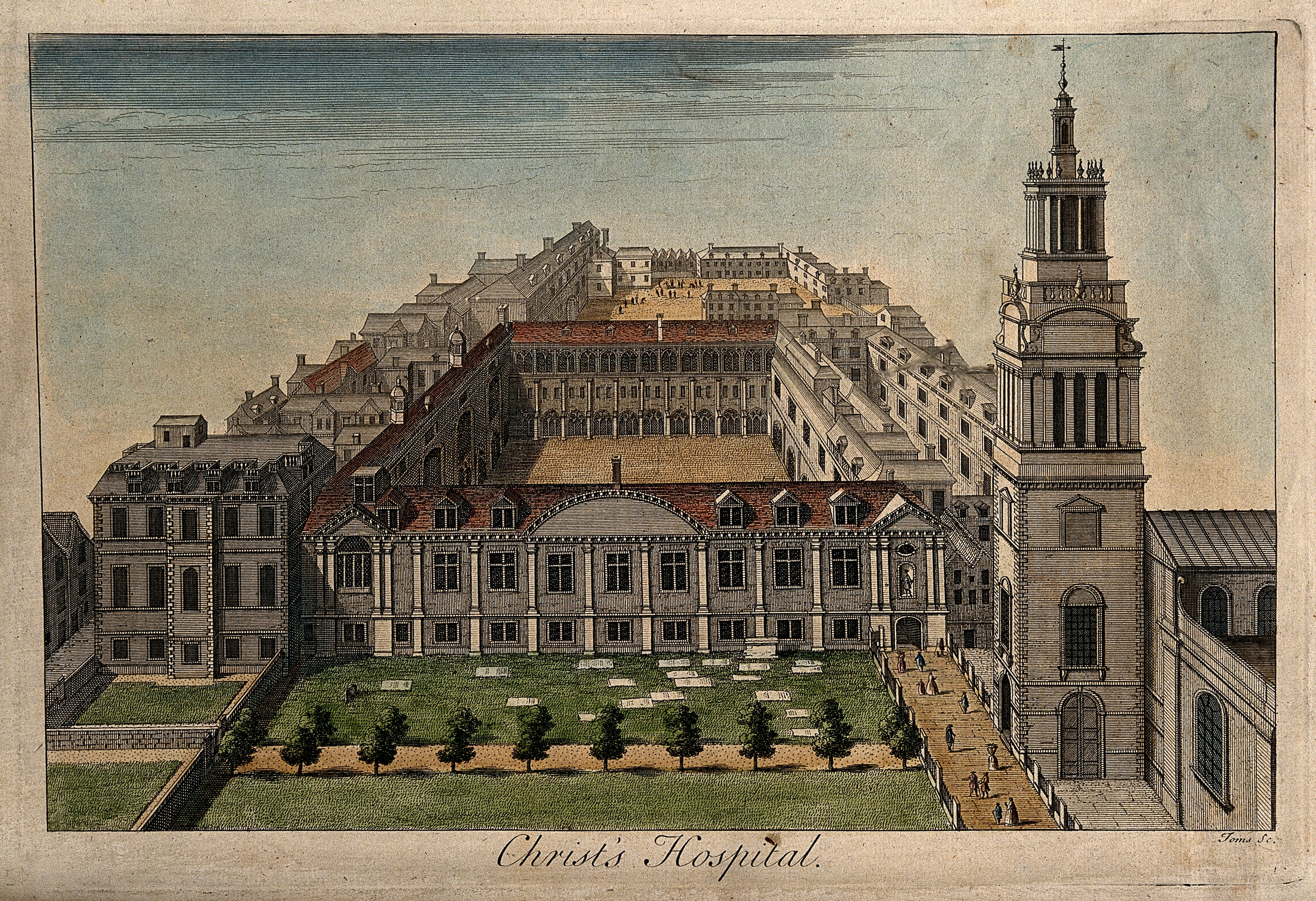
Christ's Hospital School, Newgate, London, where Edwards attended school in his early education

== Career ==
Edwards was a professional military officer by training. In 1906, upon his arrival in Uganda, he took on more than just the Inspector General position of the British East Africa Police and the Uganda Police; he also eventually took on the military command of British and local African soldiers serving the British Empire—who, at the time, were poised to confront the German military front in East Africa. Per the words contained in the official (Kenya) Gazette, his appointment orders extended to the Uganda Protectorate "Prisons" system.

Considered an "indefatigable worker, a stickler for efficiency [and] a stern disciplinarian," Edwards was a leader who represented and protected the strategic interests of the then British Empire in colonial East Africa.

Military leadership over civilian police forces in colonial territory was typical under British rule. Following General Edwards' leadership, other British military officers came to the helm of Uganda's police leadership until 1950.

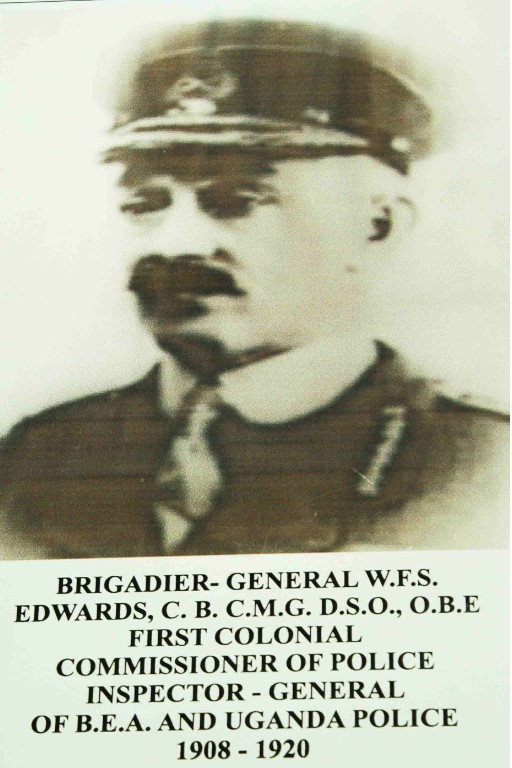
120+ year picture of Brig General William FS Edwards – commonly known as Brig General WFS Edwards

Edwards commanded Port Amelia Force (PAMFORCE) that opposed German incursions into Portuguese East Africa (current Mozambique). He also commanded the East Africa Expeditionary Forces (during the East African campaign (World War I), and a contingency Force code-named Edforce.

=== Military ===
==== Chronology of events/operations ====
- January 1897 – Commissioned 2nd lieutenant in 4th Battalion, Devon Regiment.
- 1899 – deployed to Sierra Leone, West Africa.
- October 1899 to May 1902 – engaged in the Second Boer War. Wounded twice.
- January 1900 – Promoted to full lieutenant.
- 1900 – Attached to the Ashanti Field Force.
- April 1901 – Promoted to captain.
- 1901 to 1906 – South Africa Constabulary.
- 1907 – Attached to the Kioga Punitive Force.
- 1914 to 1918, in the East African campaign (World War I) against German forces. General Edwards commanded a contingency of forces in East Africa named "Edforce".
- 1915 – simultaneous conflict against Turkana incursions.
- 1916 – Kagera River conflict against German frontline forces.
- 1917 – promoted to lieutenant colonel, commander of communication lines; 1917 to 1918 – British commander of East Africa Expeditionary Forces.
- 1918 – promoted to brigadier-general.
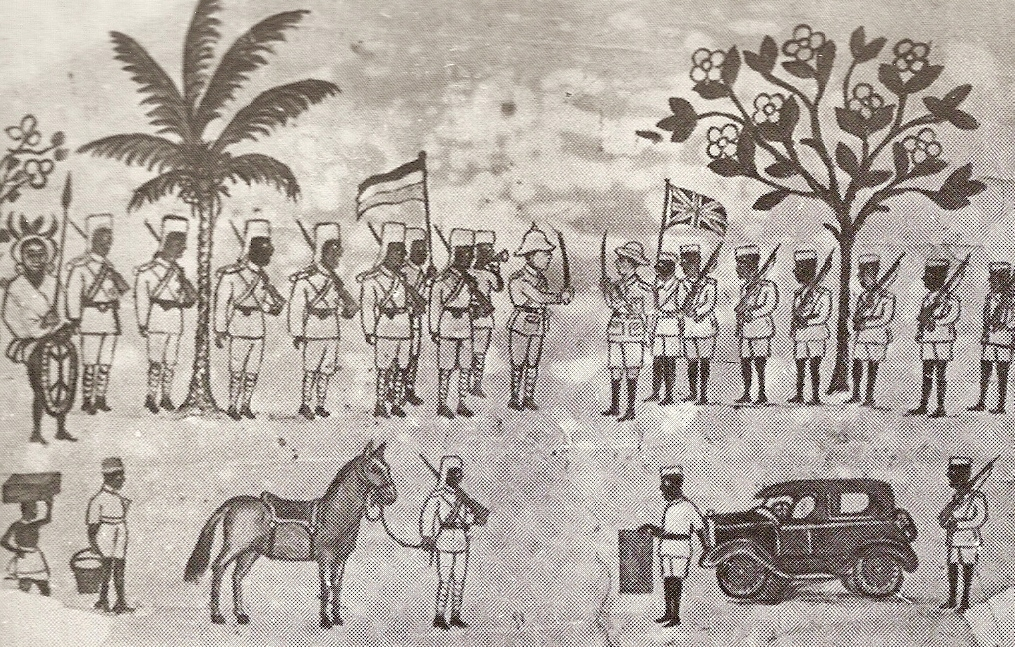
  Lettow's surrender to Edwards at Abercorn.
- 25 November 1918 – accepted surrender of German forces (under command of General Paul von Lettow-Vorbeck) at Abercorn, North Rhodesia (now Mbala, Zambia). The Mbala War Memorial, designed by Sir Edwin Lutyens, commemorates this event.

==== Achievements ====
- overcame incursions of the Turkana resistance in East Africa and Uganda Protectorate, 1915. Earned DSO and the troops under him earned the General Service Medal (1915) East Africa, bestowed by His Majesty The King (George V, aka George Frederick Ernest Albert)
- raided German (Schutztruppe) posts and demolished frontline cover areas of the enemy across the Kagera River.
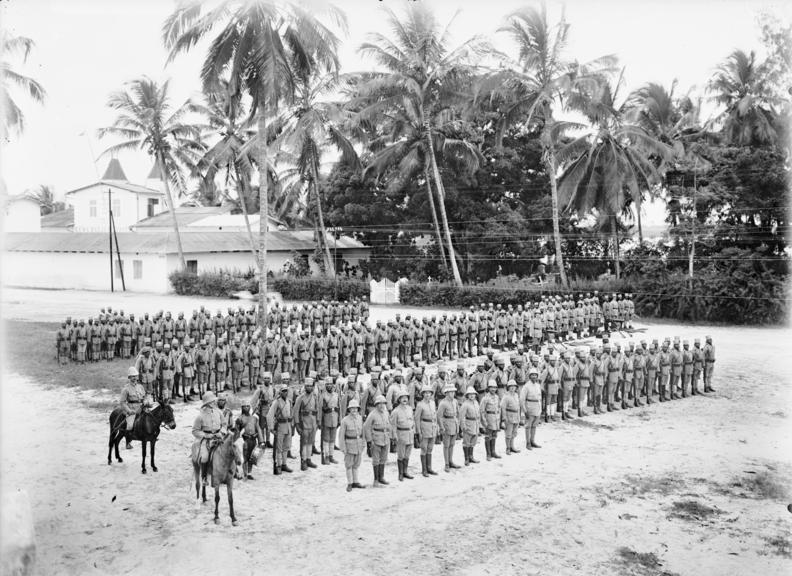
  Bundesarchiv Bild 105-DOA3056, A German post, "Schutztruppe".
- commanded forces under austere conditions as the Commander of Communication Lines, under the top Commander in Chief General Jan Smuts
- overcame German forces, in conjunction with Belgian, and Portuguese forces, in East Africa in 1918, leading to the historical surrender of Paul von Lettow-Vorbeck (Commander of the German military forces) on 25 November 1918, at Abercorn, North Rhodesia. In display of true officership, General Edwards ceremoniously returned General Paul von Lettow-Vorbeck's sword that the latter had given him as a sign of truce, "marking his respect for a noble opponent". General Paul von Lettow-Vorbeck is reported to have only surrendered after hostilities ended in Europe.

=== Police ===
- First Inspector General (and military officer/commander) of the Uganda Protectorate Police.
- First Inspector General (and military officer/commander) of the Uganda Police Force.
- First overall Commander of the British East Africa Police.

==== Achievements ====
- Re-organized and trained the police force from a military operational force perspective to that of a civilian operational force perspective.
- Established a training depot in Nairobi in 1911, equipped with a fingerprint section.
- Established "a clear system of administration, records, files and statistics."

== See also ==
- Paul von Lettow-Vorbeck
- Mbala War Memorial
