= M'Bala =

M'Bala is a surname, and may refer to:

- Dieudonné M'bala M'bala, French comedian, actor and political activist
- Borgia M'Bala, French basketball player who played for Bluefield College, Basket club Nord Ardèche and BG Aschersleben Tigers
- Roger Gnoan M'Bala, Ivorian director
- Christophe M'Bala, character on the French animated television series Code Lyoko
- M'bala N'dombassi, French boxer
- Kevin M'Bala, football player for Arlesey Town F.C.
- Cedric M'Bala, football player, who played for PSFC Chernomorets Burgas
- Placide M'Bala, Cameroonian writer

M'Bala also means elephant in Banda.

== See also ==
- M'Bala, Mozambique in the Gaza Province
- Mbala (disambiguation)
