= Elizabeth Muwanga =

Ugandan policewoman

- Born: Elizabeth Muwanga Alalo
- Citizenship: Uganda
- Education: Bachelor of Political Science and Sociology (Makerere University)
- Occupations: Civil servant, Politician
- Years active: 1980–2019
- Employer: Uganda Police Force
- Known for: First graduate policewoman in Uganda
- Notable work: Director for Welfare and Planning, Assistant Inspector General of Police
- Title: Rtd AIGP.
- Successor: Haruna Isabirye
- Children: Grandmother to twins
- Awards: Top 50 Women Movers in Uganda (2011)

Elizabeth Muwanga Alalo is a Ugandan former Assistant Inspector General of Police (AIGP) and head of Directorate of Welfare who served in the Uganda Police Force for over 37 years. She was Uganda's first graduate police woman. She joined the police force in 1980 where only 26 people were admitted with her being the only woman admitted. She was recognised as one of the highest-ranking officers in police force in Uganda and Uganda's top fifty women movers in 2011.

== Education ==
Elizabeth Muwanga attended her primary school at Rubaga Primary School and later joined Trinity College Nabbingo for her secondary education (Uganda Certificate of Education and Uganda Advanced Certificate of Education). Elizabeth later joined Makerere University and did a bachelor's degree in political science and sociology.

== Career ==
Muwanga joined the police force in 1980 and was the only woman who was considered among 26 Ugandans who were transferred to Dar es Salaam for training. She rose through ranks during her time in force from a Cadet, Assistant Superintendent of Police (ASP), head of the welfare section and became the Assistant Inspector General Of Police the third highest rank in the Uganda Police Force.

She walked to Naguru with her colleagues for induction. However, she was later transferred to Dar es Salaam for further training after two weeks while their passports were being processed. She and fellow trainees were at Tanzania Police Staff College called Chuo Kuu Chaa Poliis in Dar es Salaam, Tanzania for nine months and later returned to Uganda a few months to the general elections where Milton Obote won as president of Uganda in 1980. After finishing her training in Dar es Salaam, she was the Cadet Officer and later served as the Assistant Superintendent of Police. She rose through the rank and was the Assistant Inspector General of Police and also heads the welfare section where she ensured the welfare of Uganda Police officers and their families. While serving as the Assistant Inspector General of Police, she commented about sexual harassment rate against female recruits at the police which had increased. Before assuming the Assistant Inspector General of Police role, she was employed as the Officer in Charge at Station Jinja, Staff Officer at South Eastern region, Quarter Master at Police Stores, Deputy Commissioner of Police, United Nations Mission in Darfur.

On 17 July 2007, she was among the seventy officers from the Uganda Police Force who participated in a one-day informational workshop on the International Criminal Court that took place in Kampala. On the same day while at the workshop held on the occasion of the International Day of Justice, she was the Commissioner of Police in-Charge Non-Human Resource and she gave a closing remarks on behalf of Inspector General of Police encouraging the ICC to organise a similar workshop for their colleagues working in Northern Uganda. However, she is now tired after serving police force for over 37. She quit the Uganda police force in 2019 while serving as the director for welfare and planning when her contract was delayed for renewal.

During her time of service she advocated for justice of female cops affected with sexual harassment and also encouraged ladies to join the police force. She made sure that the welfare of children and wives of police officers is elevated during her leadership as head of Directorate of Welfare through IGP Kale Kayihura by providing housing facilities, family income and duty-free shops within barracks.

== Personal life ==
She is a grand mother to twins.

== See also ==
- Olivia Wawire
- Polly Namaye
- Tumuheirwe Florence
