= Uganda National Health Consumers' Organisation =

- Abbreviation: UNHCO
- Formation: 1999
- Legal status: Non-profit organization
- Purpose: To promote full integration and implementation of the rights based approach in Uganda's health sector through meaningful citizen-duty bearer engagement in healthcare planning and delivery.
- Location: Kampala, Uganda
- Region served: Uganda
- Executive Director: Robinah K. Kaitiritimba
- Key people: Brig. Dr. Sam Lwanga (Founder); Prof. George B. Kirya (Board Chairman)
- Affiliations: VHR, C4C, IAPO, PfPS, COPASAH, UNNGOF, HURINET, MakSPH & ACA
- Website: Homepage

The Uganda National Health Users'/Consumers' Organization or Uganda National Health Consumers' Organisation (UNHCO) is a Ugandan nonprofit organization established in 1999 to advocate for the realization of the right to health for all Ugandans.

Since its inception, UNHCO has been implementing programs that advocate for a strong institutionalized platform that is able to articulate voices of consumers of health goods and services.

UNHCO was among the champions of the Rights Based Approach (RBA) to healthcare delivery and contributed to efforts to improve community participation and accountability. Robinah Kaitiritimba is the current executive director.

== Overview ==
UNHCO was founded in 1999 by a group of Ugandans drawn from various backgrounds. This effort was spearheaded by Brig. Dr. Sam Lwanga, the organization's first executive director. In the beginning, the vision of the founders was to create an advocacy platform on which they would raise a combined voice in relation to the protection of the rights of health consumers in Uganda.

Over the years, UNHCO has been advocating for effective citizen participation in healthcare delivery and sustainable access to affordable and quality healthcare services. This has been based on the mutuality of rights and obligations of both the health service providers and users.

In executing her mandate, UNHCO employs an empowerment strategy that focuses on strengthening the capacity of local communities to demand and hold service providers and policy makers accountable. This Rights Based Approach (RBA) enables citizens to appreciate health service delivery as a right and not as a privilege.

At the community level, UNHCO works mainly through community resource persons selected from partner CBOs, Health Unit Management Committees (HUMCs), health service providers and Local Councils (LCs) or individuals seconded by the communities themselves.

== Function ==
=== Vision, mission and objectives ===
UNHCO's vision is: A Uganda where the healthcare system guarantees full enjoyment of the right to health by all people.

UNHCO's mission is: To promote full integration and implementation of the rights based approach in Uganda's health sector through meaningful citizen-duty bearer engagement in healthcare planning and delivery.

UNHCO's Strategic objectives are:

1. Evidence based advocacy and policy engagement for improved health care delivery in Uganda undertaken using research findings.
2. Increased transparency and accountability in the delivery of quality health services.
3. Target communities effectively mobilised and utilise health services to reduce morbidity and mortality related to preventable diseases.
4. UNHCO's institutional capacity to deliver its mandate strengthened.

=== Key programme areas ===
UNHCO realizes its objectives by undertaking the following eight main functions:

1. Advocacy, policy analysis, research and development. Through this program area: health related policies and laws are adjusted to address citizens' concerns; research and policy concepts, papers and reports are published; UNHCO's input into national health policy processes and monitoring implementation is increased and visible; there are visible changes in the health sector achieved through evidence and issue based advocacy and; there is strengthened CSO leadership and representation at local level and international levels.
2. Social accountability. Through this program area: citizens demand for accountability for quality health care services in the targets area; functional feedback and redress mechanisms are established at all health facilities in the areas of implementation and; there is increased budget accountability in the health sector in Uganda.
3. Social mobilization for Health. Through this program area: there is increased knowledge on prevention of common diseases in the target communities and; increased demand and utilization of health services in the targets areas of implementation.
4. Institutional Capacity building. Through this program area: UNHCO's capacity to effectively increase, diversify, manage and sustain its membership is strengthened and; UNHCO's capacity to mobilise resources for the full implementation of its strategic plan is also strengthened.
5. Training. Through this program area, UNHCO aims to have a fully-fledged and operational training centre.
6. Monitoring and evaluation of health services' delivery issues in the country. Through this program area: a functional and effective integrated M&E system for UNHCO is to be developed and implemented and; a functional and effective management information system which facilitated easy archival and retrieval of data is to be in place.
7. Finance and Administration. Through this program area, UNHCO's Financial and administrative systems are strengthened.
8. Communication, Documentation and Public Relations. Through this program area, there is increased visibility for the work of UNHCO.

== Interventions ==
Below are some of UNHCO's past and present interventions:

1. Formulation of the Patients' Charter: UNHCO spearheaded the formulation of the Uganda Patients' Charter whose objective was to empower health consumers to demand high quality health care, to promote the rights of patients and to improve the quality of life of all Ugandans and finally eradicate poverty nationwide. The charter was adopted and implemented in Uganda's health sector by the Uganda Health Ministry (MOH) in 2009.
2. Passage of the tobacco control bill: UNHCO's commitment to tobacco control advocacy influenced the passing of the Tobacco Control Bill 2014. UNHCO viewed tobacco products as the only legal consumer products that kill people when used as intended by the manufacturer and that unlike other consumer products there were no safe ways of using tobacco products.
3. Civil Society representation at the Ministry of Health: UNHCO represents health rights focused CSOs at various strategic levels in the MoH. These include; the Health Policy Advisory Committee (HPAC), Maternal and Child Health Working Group (MCHWG) and National Health Insurance (NHI) task force. The body's strategic positioning has enabled it contribute to the formulation of the National Health Policy II, Health Sector Strategic and Investment Plan 2010/11-2014/15, the Public Private Partnership in Health (PPPH) policy, and development of a manual on Health, Human Rights and Gender. Through these and more platforms, UNHCO has contributed to the formulation of health policies and programs in Uganda:
4. Provision of leadership to health advocacy CSOs: UNHCO coordinates and hosts a coalition of 30 CSOs under the Voices for Health Rights (VHRs) umbrella. The membership organization is also involved in the coordination of health focused CSOs to commemorate the Health Rights Day held on December 7 during the annual Human Rights Week.
5. Legalization of the Right to Health: UNHCO is leading the ongoing advocacy to strengthen the legal framework for the right to health in Uganda. With the support of Open Society Initiative for Eastern Africa (OSIEA) in 2013, UNHCO implemented Empowering Citizens to Demand for a Health Sector That Is Accountable and Relevant, a project that focuses on the empowerment of communities to demand and participant in improving health service delivery in different parts of Uganda.

== Membership ==
UNHCO is a member of international networks like the International Alliance of Patients' Organizations (IAPO), the Africa Capacity Alliance (ACA)., C4C, Patient safety organization (PfPS) and COPASAH as well as local networks like UNNGOF, HURINET, MakSPH and Voices for Health Rights.

Over the years, the organization has developed partnerships with the World Bank, European Union (EU) and the World Health Organization (WHO) to promote the rights based approach in healthcare delivery as well as monitor and provide feedback to decision-makers and service providers on the effective delivery of health services in Uganda.
