= Chambeshi Monument =

World War I memorial in Zambia

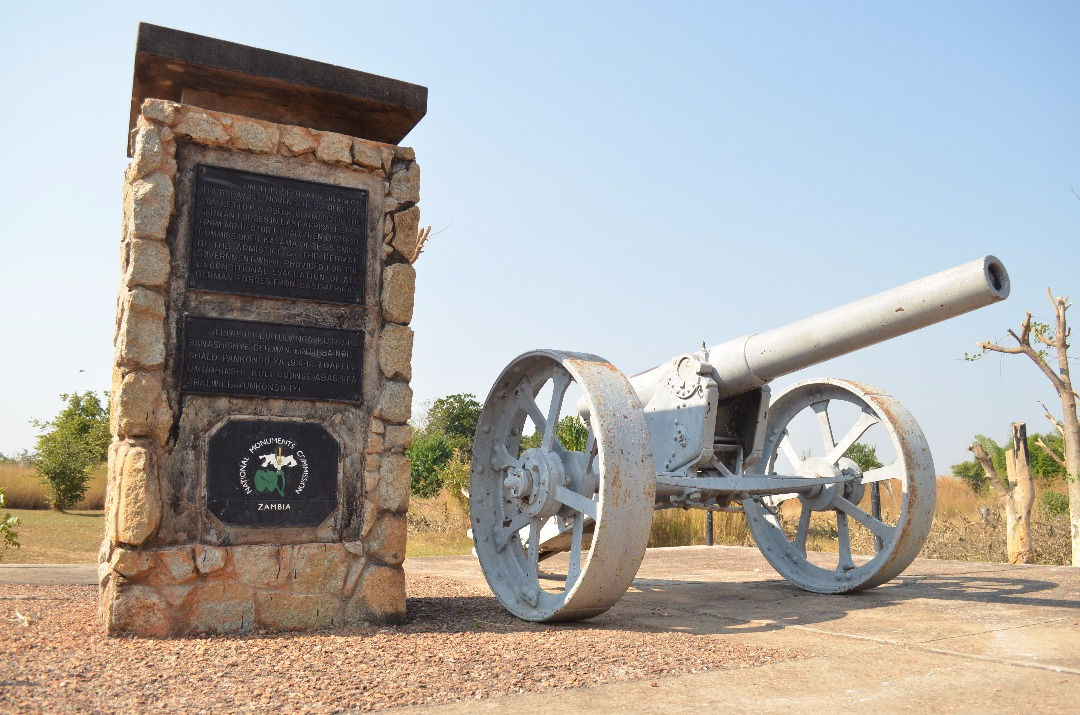
Chambeshi Monument

The Chambeshi Monument, in the Northern Province of Zambia, also called the Chambeshi Memorial and the Lettow-Vorbeck Memorial, commemorates the final cessation of hostilities of the First World War, three days after the Armistice in Europe.

== The reasons for the monument ==
The monument bears a plaque which reads:

On this spot at 7.30 am on Thursday 14th November 1918, General von Lettow-Vorbeck, commanding the German forces in East Africa, heard from Mr Hector Croad, then District Commissioner Kasama, of the signing of the Armistice by the German government, which provided for the unconditional evacuation of all German forces from East Africa.

A second plaque in the Bemba language ends with the words

Twapela umuchinshi kuli bonse abashipa abalwile mu nkondo iyi ("We honour all brave soldiers who fought in this war".)

The message given to General von Lettow-Vorbeck was a telegram sent to Croad which read

Please send the following to General von Lettow-Vorbeck under a white flag - The English Prime Minister [sic] sent notice that on 11th November an Armistice was signed and that the fighting on all fronts should cease on 11th November at 11 o'clock. I order my troops to end hostilities as from now and I expect you to do the same. General van Deventer.

Hence the Memorial marks the cessation of hostilities, not the surrender.

== Location ==
Location of the monument in Zambia Coordinates 10.92168°S 31.07664°E

The location of the Monument is on the north bank of the Chambeshi River, near the northern end of the old Chambeshi Bridge (which was built later, this bridge was destroyed by Rhodesian troops during the Rhodesian Bush War, a new bridge was built further upstream) on the Mpika-Kasama road. Most accounts of the war say that Lettow-Vorbeck surrendered at Abercorn, 250 km to the north, giving the impression that he penetrated just the few kilometres to Abercorn from German East Africa but that is only because he was instructed by Allied commanders in Northern Rhodesia to march his troops there for the official surrender on 23 November 1918.

== Historical background ==
The British force had been waiting in the Abercorn area to attack the German forces coming from northern Mozambique, thinking they would make for Lake Tanganyika, but General von Lettow-Vorbeck had evaded them by turning south-west towards Kasama. Its tiny British population evacuated to Mpika, except for nine who set up two Maxim guns at the Chambeshi, but they did not know how to work them. One, Charlie Simpson, had with him about £10,000 which was all the cash from the government offices and businesses in Kasama, which he buried in a goat pen near the rubber factory he ran, thinking that the goats' hoofprints would hide evidence of digging, and that the Germans would probably be more interested in the goats than looking for the money. On arrival at the Chambeshi the Germans machine-gunned the rubber factory before Croad arrived with the telegram.

== Setting up the monument ==
The Monument was unveiled on 14 November 1953 as a National Monument of Northern Rhodesia (now Zambia) and consists of a large stone platform with the plaques set into a stone pillar, next to a cannon of the era (but not one used by the Germans).

== See also ==
- Mbala War Memorial
