= Victoria Kakoko Sebagereka =

Ugandan legislator, politician, and AIDS activist (1946–2021)

- Born: July 17, 1946
- Died: August 4, 2021 (aged 75)
- Education: London College; Kianda College
- Occupation(s): Legislator, activist

Victoria Kakoko Sebagereka (17 July 1946 - 4 August 2021) was a Ugandan legislator, politician and AIDS activist. She served as the Woman Member of Parliament for Kayunga District in Uganda's seventh parliament.

== Background and education ==
Sebagereka was born to Bernard Kakoko and Princess Agnes Nkwenge Bagaya Kakoko (commonly referred to as Anne Mega).

She attended Kasukuru Palace Nursery and Kyebambe Primary School before enrolling at Bweranyangi Girls Senior Secondary School. She completed her secondary education at Maryhill High School in Mbarara.

Her tertiary education was at London College, England and then Kianda College, Kenya and she qualified as a secretary.

== Career ==
=== Activism ===
Kakoko served as the Chair of the National Council of Women in 1986. As one of the conveners of the International Conference on Women's Healthcare at Gayaza High School in 1990, she invited the late Philly Bongole Lutaaya to address the conference on his HIV/AIDS status. She later joined The AIDS Support Organisation (TASO) as a member.

=== Politics ===
During Uganda's 1994 Ugandan Constituent Assembly election, Sebagereka was elected as the delegate to represent Mukono. During this time, she served on the 45-member Select Committee 4 which was responsible for "discussing chapters on; the Republic, Citizenship, Local Government and General and miscellaneous provisions" in the proposed constitution.

Sebagereka later on served as the Woman Representative for Kayunga in Uganda's seventh parliament.

=== Farming ===
Sebagereka was President of the Women's' Committee of International Federation of Agricultural Producers in addition to representing the Central Region at the Uganda National Farmers Association.

== See also ==
- Noerine Kaleeba
- Kayunga district
- Mukono district
