= Uganda Road Sector Support Initiative =

- Abbreviation: URSSI
- Formation: 2010
- Legal status: Non-profit organization
- Location: Kampala, Uganda
- Region served: Sub-Saharan Africa
- Members: Transport Sector Stakeholders & Volunteers
- Official language: English
- Executive Director: Mutabazi Sam Stewart
- Key people: Henry Bazira; Board Member; Daisy Owomugasho; Board Member
- Website: https://ugandaroadsector.org

The Uganda Road Sector Support Initiative (URSSI), is a Ugandan transport advocacy nonprofit organization that works to improve governance in the transport sector, with a special focus on road transport. It is based in Uganda, the third-largest economy in the East African Community and impacts Sub-Saharan Africa.

== Overview ==
URSSI was founded in 2010 as a result of several challenges in the road sub-sector in Uganda. Being a pioneer NGO in the transport sector, it is the only CSO in the country that carries out research, advocacy and information dissemination about the sector.

URSSI is part of the Transport Sector Working Group which deliberates on issues affecting the sector and also avails essential information to Parliament and the general public to help counter corruption and abuse in the road construction industry. The activities of the organization are geared towards restructuring urban transformation and planning practices in developing countries.

Over the years, URSSI has advocated for Uganda to: join the Construction Sector Transparency Initiative (CoST); adopt and implement the Open Contracting Data Standard (OCDS) and; drive the process of making citizens Road Monitoring Tool. URSSI is also the founding member and current host of the Civil Society Coalition on Transport in Uganda (CISCOT), a coalition of 25 member organizations, whose aim is to contribute to an efficient, effective and safe transport system.

== Funding and sponsorship ==
URSSI receives financial and other support from civil society and corporate organizations, including the following:

1. The World Bank
2. United Nations Office on Drugs and Crime (UNODC)
3. The UNCAC Coalition
4. CrossRoads, a four-year programme working to improve Uganda's road network and industry.
5. The Ministry of Works and Transport
6. The Uganda National Roads Authority (UNRA)
7. Uganda Road Fund
8. Kampala Capital City Authority (KCCA)

== Key programmes & events ==
URSSI has in the recent past been involved in running the following programmes:

- In 2011, URSSI carried out a nationwide campaign under the Strengthening Community Awareness and Participation in Road Sector Legislation programme to appeal to Ugandan citizens to respect Road reserves by ensuring that buildings conform to the Road Act and the Access to Roads Act.
- Every December, URSSI coordinates the Annual Road Safety Walk to appeal to the general public to ensure safety on the road during the festive season, the period when road accidents are at their maximum in Uganda.
- In 2014, URSSI developed a Road Monitoring Tool with assistance from The World Bank to guide civil society and Ugandan citizens in: observing the implementation of road works; comparing plans and standards with actual accomplishments; checking particular aspects of specific projects and; recommending remedial actions where necessary.
