= Mbala War Memorial =

War memorial in Mbala, Zambia

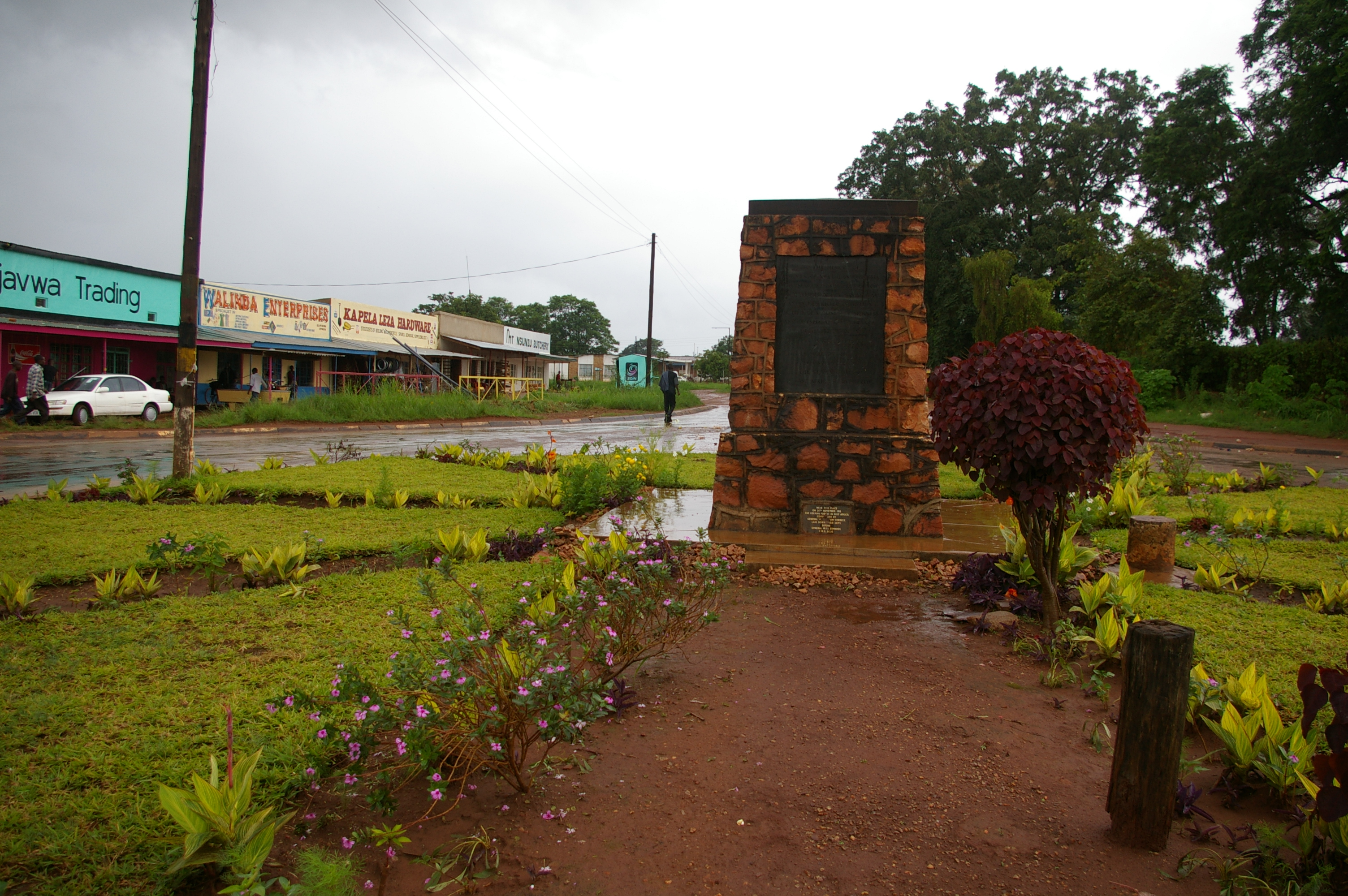
Mbala War Memorial in 2008

The Mbala War Memorial (also known as the Abercorn Memorial) is a First World War memorial which stands on a roundabout on the M1 road heading south from the centre of Mbala, Zambia. The truncated red stone column was one of the last war memorials designed by Edwin Lutyens. It commemorates almost 1,500 native carriers from North Rhodesia who died in action, or from wounds or sickness, during the East African campaign. Their names are not recorded.

The memorial bears a plaque with the inscription:

To the memory of / 1467 men of Northern Rhodesia / who served in the British Army / as carriers in the Great War / and were killed in action / or died of wounds or sickness / and in especial remembrance / of 433 who fell in / Northern Rhodesia // Here on the / 25th November 1918 / the German forces / in East Africa surrendered

A smaller plaque records

Near this place / on 25th November 1918, / the German forces in East Africa, / commanded by / General von Lettow Vorbeck / laid down their arms, / before / General W.F.S. Edwards / C.M.G., D.S.O.

Before the independence of Zambia in 1964, the settlement was known as Abercorn, after James Hamilton, 2nd Duke of Abercorn, chairman of the British South Africa Company in 1895 when the company took over administration of North-Eastern Rhodesia. The province was the most northerly outpost of British colonial presence in southern Africa. It bordered the German colony in German East Africa to the northeast.

After the outbreak of the First World War, Abercorn was defended against repeated German attacks in late 1914, and into 1915. After being pushed back, the German forces eventually re-entered British territory in 1918. The memorial stands near the place where the Imperial German forces in East Africa commanded by Paul Emil von Lettow-Vorbeck formally surrendered to British General William F.S. Edwards on 25 November 1918, concluding the East African campaign.

The formal surrender at Abercorn came nine days after Lettow-Vorbeck had agreed a ceasefire at the Chambeshi River some 250 km (160 mi) further south. The ceasefire is commemorated by the Chambeshi Monument.
