= Gladyce Kachope =

Ugandan educator and administrator

Sr. Gladyce Kachope
- Born: Mahamba Village Kabarole District
- Citizenship: Ugandan
- Education: Bachelor's degree in Education, master's in Education Administration
- Occupation: Teacher
- Successor: Sr. Sabina Tumusiime
- Awards: African Union Continental Teacher Prize, New Vision's Teachers Making a Difference Award

Gladyce Kachope is a Ugandan nun, secondary school teacher, and administrator who has served as a headteacher in schools including Immaculate Heart Nyakibale Girls' Secondary school in Rukungiri District and Boni Consilii Girls’ Vocational Secondary School in Isingiro District, Western Uganda.

Kachope was given the African Union Continental Teacher Prize (2019) in recognition of her role in the teaching profession. She is also a recipient of the New Vision Teachers Making a Difference Award (2023).

== Background and education ==
Sister Gladyce Kachope was born in Mahamba village, Kabarole District, Western Uganda to the late Mr. and Mrs. Daudi Kachope Muntukwonka Achaali.

She began her education at Kiburarara Primary School, and joined Immaculate Heart Girls' school for her secondary education. Kachope enrolled at Makerere University where she earned a bachelor's degree in education, specialising in History and CRE (Christian Religious Education). She earned a master's degree in Education Administration from Makerere University.

== Career ==
Kachope started her teaching career at Maryhill High School, Mbarara, where she served as a teacher and was promoted to deputy teacher. In 2006, she was transferred to Immaculate Heart Girls' school in Rukungiri District,Western Uganda, following the death of her predecessor, Sister Petronilla Ahikire, where she served as the headteacher for 19 years up to 2025. In 2025, she was transferred to Boni Consilii Girls' Vocational Secondary School in Isingiro District as the headteacher.

During her leadership at Immaculate Heart Girls' School in Rukungiri district, the school exhibited a great improvement in academic performance and discipline, and saw an increase in student enrollment, with over 2000 students, compared with 912 students when she joined, The school also saw development of modern infrastructure and an increase in staff. Kachope pioneered the acquisition of land for agricultural projects and the establishment of food security initiatives such as banana plantations and cattle farming at the school.

== Awards ==
- African Union Continental Teacher Prize
- New Vision: Teachers Making a Difference Award
