= Luke Kercan Ofungi =

Ugandan police officer (1934-1990)

- Born: March 29, 1934; Padolo Village, Okoro County, Nebbi District, Uganda
- Died: September 4, 1990 (aged 56)
- Occupations: Police officer, businessman
- Known for: Law enforcement

Luke Kercan Ofungi (29 March 1934 – 4 September 1990) was an inspector general in the Uganda Police Force, a businessman in the travel industry in Uganda, and a member of the Alur community.

== Early history ==
Ofungi was born in Padolo Village, Okoro County, Nebbi District, West Nile sub-region, Northern Region of Uganda. Between 1951 and 1953, he attended the East African Orthodox School, completing Junior Secondary III (J3). On 10 October 1954, he joined the Uganda Police Force as a recruit police constable. He was assigned to the Police Training School at Kibuli, in Kampala. On 1 January 1957, he was promoted to corporal and on 1 October 1959, to sergeant. On 1 June 1960, he was promoted to station sergeant, and on 1 February 1961, he was promoted to sub-inspector and transferred to Arua, attached to the Special Branch l, a division of the Uganda Police.

On 1 April 1963, he was promoted to inspector of police and sent to the United Kingdom for further studies. On 10 October 1963, he was promoted to the gazetted rank of assistant superintendent of police. On 5 September 1964, he was transferred from Arua to Fort Portal, still attached to the Special Branch, serving in that capacity until 8 June 1965, when he was transferred to Special Branch Headquarters in Kampala.

On 10 October 10, 1970, he was promoted to superintendent of police. On 13 May 1973, he was promoted to senior assistant commissioner of police. On 1 January 1974, he was appointed commissioner of police.

== Idi Amin's regime ==
As IGP, Ofungi's deputy was Ali Toweli. George William Luzide Mukasa was appointed Director of the Criminal Investigation Department, (CID) and Aisu was made Director of the Special Branch. On 1 August 1974, Inspector General Luke Ofungi was sent on leave by President Idi Amin after defying the dictator openly at a security meeting. Knowing that his life was in danger, Ofungi fled across the border with his family to exile in Nairobi, Kenya.

== After Idi Amin ==
After the fall of Amin's regime, Ofungi returned and was appointed Deputy Inspector General of Police on 9 October 1979, to help reorganize the Police Force. He was later sent to Nairobi in Uganda's Foreign Service. On 15 May 1980, he was appointed Inspector General of Police, serving in that capacity until 1 May 1981, when he took leave of absence, under the government of President Milton Obote.

On 1 November 1985, following the overthrow of the Obote II regime, Luke Ofungi was re-appointed Inspector General of Police by Tito Okello. The Okello regime was overthrown in January 1986, and President Yoweri Museveni took over. Ofungi continued to serve as Inspector General. Sometime in 1989, he was sent on forced leave, under investigation, together with his two deputies; Kyefulumya of the Administration department, and Maswere of Operations. The Uganda government cleared him of what were proven to be false charges and went on to posthumously appoint him on contract effective November 1, 1989, for 24 months.

== Later years ==
During his leave he focused on the tour and travel company he had set up in the 1970s and with his wife Claudia Kinobe, and continued to run a confectionery and restaurant called Confe in Kampala. Ofungi served as Inspector General of Police through four regimes and many turbulent years in Uganda. He died on 4 September 1990 at the age of 56, before being reinstated to the post of IGP for the fifth time. Luke Ofungi was buried in his home county on 12 September 1990. In honour of his contributions to the building of the Uganda Police Force and the country. The Uganda government accorded him a full state funeral.

== See also ==
- Katumba Wamala
- Kale Kayihura
