= Rosette Kajungu Mutambi =

Ugandan politician

- Born: October 26, 1964 (age 61)
- Citizenship: Uganda
- Education: Bachelors degree
- Alma mater: Maryhill High School, Makerere University, University of Leicester
- Occupations: Politician, journalist
- Political party: National Resistance Movement

Rosette Kajungu Mutambi (born 26 October 1964) is a Ugandan professional social worker and journalist, a politician and legislator who represented the people of Mbarara district as district woman representative in the Parliament of Uganda. She is a member of the National Resistance Movement (NRM) party, the party in political leadership in Uganda under the chairmanship of Yoweri Kaguta Museveni president of the republic of Uganda.

== Early life and education ==
Kajungu Mutambi was born on 26 October 1964. She studied her O-level education from Maryhill High School where she undertook her Uganda Certificate of Education (UCE) in 1981. She later enrolled at Bweranyangi Girls' Senior Secondary School for her A-level education and did the Uganda Advanced Certificate of Education (UACE) examinations in 1984 thereafter joining Makerere University where she graduated with a bachelor's degree in arts in 1988. She earned a certificate in public relations from (MTAC) Nakawa in 1992 and added a diploma in journalism in 1993 from Uganda Management Institute (UMI). She later pursued an advanced certificate in journalism from the International Institute for Journalism Berlin in 1996 and added a postgraduate diploma in management from the University of Leicester in 2008. She is currently pursuing a master's degree in social sector planning and management from Makerere University.

== Career ==
Kajungu Mutambi was the founder/executive director of HEPS Uganda coalition for health promotion from 2000 to 2016. She was a volunteer coordinator of Health Action east Africa from 1998 to 2000 and was information officer in the ministry of information and broadcasting/office of the president from 1990 to 1998. Between 1994 and 1996, Kajungu Mutambi was deputy manager, AIDS control programme, was a research assistant at Recon Uganda limited from 1987 to 1989, and was a community health consultant from 2002 to date. She is currently a woman member of parliament of Uganda since 2016. In parliament, she serves on the committee on local government accounts and the committee on health. She is a member of Uganda Women Parliamentary Association (UWOPA) where she is the chairperson of the succession act round table committee.

Kajungu Mutambi has membership in professional bodies; Uganda media women association as a full member and an associate member in the Association of social workers.
