= Forum of Women's NGOs =

Non-Governmental Organization

The Forum of Women's NGOs in Kyrgyzstan is an NGO set up to provide administrative and financial aid to other NGOs, whose primary concern is helping women.

== Introduction ==
The Forum of Women's NGOs of Kyrgyzstan (FWNGO) was conceived in 1995. It was created to provide assistance to women's NGOs and establishing a network for mutual cooperation. The Forum seeks to consolidate the country's network of women's organizations, activists, and leaders. The consolidation activities focus on strengthening the capacity of institutional members to improve women's lives and increase gender equality in communities across Kyrgyzstan.

Accordingly, the Forum focuses its main efforts in addressing gender issues in the Central Asian region. Today, the Forum of Women's NGOs of Kyrgyzstan works closely with more than 85 NGOs in Kyrgyzstan.

== History & Formation ==
Following a conference of Central Asian women's organisations in 1995, participants at the conference decided that regular meetings between women's organizations would facilitate information exchange and help groups cooperate. Thus, they published a women's informational bulletin titled "Joogazyn" (Tulip) in Russian and Kyrgyz; assisting group members in writing grants and project proposals; and sponsoring conferences and seminars on topics concerning women.

== Vision ==
"Women’s empowerment is a key to successful development"

== Mission ==
The Forum's mission is the consolidation and strengthening of women's movement towards gender equality and women's empowerment.

This is achieved by building partnerships towards women's equality, creating an increase in women's participation in public life through their organizations and NGOs.

As part of this mission the Forum of Women's NGOs of Kyrgyzstan contributes to developing the capacity of women's organizations', and organizing active networking in Kyrgyzstan and in Central Asia.

== Activities ==
The Forum has three main activities: i. monthly seminars and national workshops ii. monthly newsletters iii. training to develop organizational capacity

With funding from the Asian Development Bank, the Forum conducted a number of activities designed to build partnerships between women's NGOs in both the Kyrgyz Republic and in Central Asia.

== Peaceful March of Citizens for Law and Order ==
These ‘marches’ are organized on a regular basis, as a form of a peaceful demonstration, bringing to light “women's positions with regards to growing criminality in Bishkek and in Kyrgyzstan”.

Flyers are distributed during the March and the text of flyers were in two languages – Kyrgyz and Russian to help raise awareness. Those in attendance don violet scarves, as a show of solidarity.

Though there was a crackdown on the media's broadcasting of this peaceful demonstration, certain political leaders acquiesced to the requests put forth by the Forum at past marches. Nevertheless, major media networks were present at past events to interview some of the participants of the demonstration, a sign that even if there was no televising the event, there was still much interest from the public and media at large.

== Women's Dialogue ==
In June 1997, the Forum hosted a conference of Central Asian women's NGOs entitled "Women's Dialogue".

== 50 Women in Politics ==
This is a four-year programme run by the Forum, and it seeks to increase gender equality in Kyrgyzstan's political system and aims to empower women's political leadership capacity by increasing the number of women participating in the next set of regional and local elections. The ultimate goal is to facilitate the election of female candidates in the 2010 parliamentary elections.

== School of Women’s Studies ==
At present, the Forum is working to create a School of Women's Studies in Bishkek.

== Affiliations ==
The Forum is an active member of the United Nations ECOSOC and has participated several sessions in the interests of UN ECOSOC in addressing the status of women.

The Forum is an active member of the Asian-Pacific Forum on Women, Law and Development (APWLD). It represents the national monitor for Violence Against Women (VAW) in Kyrgyzstan.

The Forum is also supported by the European Union in campaigning the role of civil society by encouraging non-state actors to play an active role.

== Other Resources ==
- http://www2.ohchr.org/english/bodies/cedaw/docs/NGOs/ForumofWomensNGOS_Kyrgyzstan42.pdf
- http://unesdoc.unesco.org/images/0014/001465/146593e.pdf
