= Maryhill High School =

Coordinates: 0.6155°S 30.6335°E

- Mbarara, Mbarara District; Uganda

Information
- Type: Public Middle School and High School
- Motto: Domine Dirige Nos (Lord guide us)
- Established: 1961
- Athletics: Track, Tennis, Netball, Volleyball, Football, Basketball, and Hockey
- Website: Homepage

Maryhill High School is a catholic founded Girls’ O & A-level Boarding school located at Nyamitanga hill in Mbarara District in the Western Region of Uganda. The school is affiliated with the Roman Catholic Diocese of Mbarara. It was started in 1961 with the aim of promoting the education of the girl child to build the nation.

== Location ==
It is located on Nyamitanga Hill, about 2.5 kilometres (2 mi) from Mbarara City's central business district, along the Mbarara-Kabale Highway.

== Notable staff ==
- Gladyce Kachope

== Notable alumni ==
- Emma Boona, teacher, public administrator and politician
- Leah Kagasa, model and beauty pageant contestant
- Kasha Nabagesera, LGBT rights activist
- Polly Namaye, communications professional, educator and policewoman
- Irene Pauline Batebe, Permanent Secretary, Ministry of Energy and Mineral Development
- Victoria Kakoko Sebagereka, politician and AIDS activist

== See also ==
- Polly Namaye
- Mbarara
