= Mukono Health Centre IV =

Coordinates: 00°21′40″N 32°44′49″E

- Uganda Ministry of Health

Geography
- Location: Mukono Town, Uganda

Organisation
- Care system: Primary
- Type: Outpatient
- Affiliated university: Uganda Ministry of Health

Services
- Emergency department: IV
- Beds: 12

History
- Opened: 2006

Links
- Other links: Hospitals in Uganda

Mukono Health Centre IV (MHC4), commonly known as Mukono Mini Hospital is an outpatient health facility in Mukono Town in Uganda.

== Location ==
The health facility is located on the Kampala-Jinja Highway, in the town of Mukono, approximately 20 kilometres (12 mi), east of Kampala, the capital and largest city in the country. The coordinates of the clinic are: 0°21'40.0"N, 32°44'49.0"E (Latitude:0.361123; Longitude:32.746941).

== Overview ==
MHC4 is owned and operated by the Government of Uganda, through the Uganda Ministry of Health. The facility faces challenges with infrastructure, staffing and medication. Some of the operational funding is met by outside donors. There are plans to upgrade the facility to full hospital status.

== See also ==
- List of hospitals in Uganda
- Uganda Ministry of Health
