= Human Rights Network Uganda =

Ugandan non-governmental organization

- Abbreviation: HURINET
- Predecessor: Martin Okumu-Masiga
- Formation: 1993
- Legal status: Non-governmental organization
- Purpose: To foster the promotion, protection and respect of human rights in Uganda through linking and strengthening the capacity of member organizations.
- Location: Kampala, Uganda
- Region served: East Africa
- Members: 60 CSOs
- Executive Director: Mohammad Ndifuna
- Affiliations: CICC, CHRI, Human Rights House Network, AFIC; EAHAHRDN, EACSOF
- Website: Homepage; Official blog

The Human Rights Network - Uganda (HURINET) is a Ugandan non-governmental organization (NGO) whose mission is to foster the promotion, protection and respect of human rights in Uganda through linking and strengthening the capacity of member organizations. HURINET works towards having a Ugandan society free of human rights abuse. It is an umbrella organization of 60 human rights organizations. Mohammad Ndifuna is the current executive director.

== Overview ==
HURINET was established in 1993 by a group of eight human rights organizations. It was formally registered as a not for profit organization in 1994. The identity of HURINET lies with its diverse membership of 60 NGOs. Membership is drawn from organizations that are committed to a wide range of human rights issues which are complementary in terms of areas of focus including: civil and political rights; economic, social and cultural rights; children's rights; gender and women's issues; peacebuilding and conflict resolution; prisoners' rights; refugee rights and labour rights.

The network is a host to a number of national civil society campaigns and coalitions including: National Coalition on Human Rights Defenders Uganda; National Coalition on Transitional Justice; Uganda Coalition on the International Criminal Court; National Coalition on Police Accountability & Security Sector Reform; Human Rights Education Coalition; Economic, Social & Cultural Rights Coalition and the Coalition on Freedom of Information among others.

== Function ==
=== Vision, mission and objectives ===
HURINET's vision is: A society free from human rights abuse

HURINET's mission is: To foster the promotion, protection and respect of human rights in Uganda through linking and strengthening the capacity of member organizations at national, regional and international levels.

HURINET's objectives are to:

- Promote and protect human rights as provided for in the regional and international instruments that Uganda is party to and as provided in the constitution of Uganda;
- Encourage close collaboration and networking among human rights organizations in Uganda;
- Encourage optimum sharing of information and resources both human and material among human rights organizations in Uganda;
- Continually assess a collective impact in the Ugandan society occasioned by several programs of human rights organizations in Uganda;
- Build the professional capacity of human rights organizations through training, research and technical skills acquisition;
- Adopt strategies necessary for an effective and coordinated human rights advocacy in the country;
- Develop policy guidelines for the effective, proper, transparent and accountable conduct of human rights organizations in Uganda; and
- Provide a frame work for regional collaboration and exchange- for the sharing of experiences and strategies and the analysis of specific needed advocacy skills thus making human rights organizations more effective in the ongoing human rights education and information.

=== Key program areas ===
HURINET has six key program areas which fall under the following categories:

1. Advocacy, Research and Information Exchange Program: Under this program area, HURINET aims to facilitate collective advocacy and action of human rights defenders and pro-democracy activists in influencing and shaping the human rights agenda in Uganda.
2. Capacity Building and Network Development Program: Under this program area, HURINET aims to grow and strengthen a fellowship of human rights defenders in Uganda that are well grounded in the norms and best practices in human rights protection and promotion, rule of law and good governance and ensure integration in the regional and international human rights movement.
3. International Criminal & Transitional Justice (IC & TJ) Program: Under this program area, the human rights body aims to engage the state and other supranational bodies on the ratification, domestication, and implementation of international treaties and other instruments especially those relating to promoting accountability and ending impunity after conflict.
4. Human Rights Fund (HRF) Program: The Fund was established in 2001 by Human Rights Network-Uganda (HURINET) in collaboration with the Swedish International Development Agency (SIDA) and the Royal Netherlands Embassy (RNE) as an initiative to support the promotion and defense of human rights in Uganda. It is a re-granting initiative that enhances the work and capacity of CSOs and groups involved in the promotion of human rights in Uganda through providing them with financial and skills support. Member CSOs of the National Coalition of Human Rights Defenders-Uganda (NCHRDs-U) have benefited greatly from this program.
5. Monitoring, Documentation and Reporting Under Regional & International Mechanisms (RIM): Under this program area, HURINET aims to equip civil society organizations in Uganda with skills on how to hold the state accountable to international instruments Uganda has ratified.
6. Institutional Strengthening and Development: This area of focus involves: strengthening the operational and policy base of HURINET with the view of enhancing effectiveness; and enhancing mutuality of understanding between HURINET and her relevant publics - as well as projecting her image as the leading human rights network in Uganda.

== Membership ==
The identity of HURINET lies with its diverse membership of 60 NGOs. Members range from purely Ugandan NGOs to international organizations. The network's members include the following:

Women Rights Cluster

1. Karambi Action for Life Improvement
2. Democracy and Human Rights Link Africa (RIDE-Africa)
3. Disabled Women's Network & Resources Organization in Uganda (DWNRO)
4. Hope After Rape (HAR)
5. National Association of Women's Organization in Uganda (NAWOU)
6. Uganda Association of Women Lawyers (FIDA)
7. Center for Domestic Violence Prevention (CEDOVIP)
8. The Baha'i Faith
9. Action for Development (ACFODE)
10. Women and Rural Development Network (WORUDET)

Child Rights Cluster

1. Defence for Children International (DCI)
2. African Network for the Prevention and Protection against Child Abuse and Neglect (ANPPCAN)
3. Huys Link Community Initiative (HUYSLINCI)
4. Uganda Children's Centre (UCC)
5. World Vision Uganda
6. Youth Aid Uganda (YAU)
7. Concern for the Girl Child (CGC)
8. Rural Action Community Based Organization (RACOBAO)
9. Joy for Children- Uganda (JFC-Uganda)
10. Avocats Sans Frontières (ASF)

Civil & Political Rights Cluster

1. Muslim Centre for Justice and Law (MCJL)
2. Human Rights Centre Uganda (HRCU)
3. African Centre for Treatment and Rehabilitation of Torture Victims (ACTV)
4. Foundation for Human Rights Initiative (FHRI)
5. Human Rights Focus-Gulu (HURIFO)
6. Uganda Joint Christian Council (UJCC)
7. Legal Aid Project (LAP)
8. Human Rights Concern (HURICO)
9. Kumi Human Rights Initiative (KHRI)
10. Rule of Law Association (RULA)
11. Public Defender Association of Uganda (PDAU)
12. Constitutionalism, Reconciliation, Human Rights and Development Organization (CEHURD)
13. National Foundation for Democracy and Human Rights in Uganda (NAFODU)
14. Mubende Human Rights

Economic Social & Cultural Rights (ESCR) Cluster

1. New Eden Christian Foundation (NECF)
2. Community Development Resource Network (CDRN)
3. Development Foundation for Rural Areas (DEFORA)
4. Platform for Labour Action (PLA)
5. Uganda National Health Consumers' Organisation (UNHCO)
6. Action Group for Health, Human Rights and HIV/AIDS (AGHA-Uganda)
7. Sudan Human Rights Association (SHRA)
8. Rural Initiative for community Empowerment (RICE West Nile)
9. Human Right Awareness and Promotion Forum (HRAPF)
10. Voluntary Action for Development (VAD)
11. Coalition of Uganda Private School Teachers' Association (COUPSTA)
12. Action for Community Development in Uganda (ACODEV-U)
13. Peace & Conflict Resolution
14. Center for Conflict Resolution (CECORE)
15. Jamii ya Kupatanisha (JYAK)
16. Life Concern (LICO)
17. Isis-Women's International Cross Cultural Exchange (Isis – WICCE)
18. Education Access Africa (EAA)
19. Rwenzori Peace Bridge of Reconciliation (RPBR)
20. Good Hope Foundation for Rural Development (GHFRD)

== See also ==
- Children's rights
- Human rights group
- Human rights literature
- Human Rights Watch
- List of human rights organizations
