= Mbala Airport =

Airport in Zambia

- IATA: MMQ; ICAO: FLBA

Summary
- Airport type: Public
- Serves: Mbala
- Elevation AMSL: 5,454 ft / 1,662 m
- Coordinates: 8°51′30″S 31°20′00″E

Map
- Location of the airport in Zambia

Runways
Direction	Length		Surface
Direction	m	ft	Surface
12/30	2,500	8,202	Asphalt
- Sources: Google Maps GCM

Mbala Airport (IATA: MMQ, ICAO: FLBA) is an airport serving Mbala, Northern Province, Zambia. Runway 12 has a displaced threshold of 95 metres (312 ft) that can be used for takeoff.

As of April 2024, there are plans by the government of Zambia to transform Mbala Airport into a military base, therefore transferring the management responsibilities from Zambia Airports Corporation Limited to the Zambian Air Force.

== See also ==
- Transport in Zambia
- List of airports in Zambia
