= Mbala, Zambia =

Mbala
- Town
- Location within Zambia
- Coordinates: 8°50′S 31°28′E
- Country: Zambia
- Province: Northern Province
- District: Mbala District
- Time zone: UTC+2 (CAT)
- Climate: Cwb

Mbala is Zambia's most northerly large town and seat of Mbala District in Northern Province, occupying a strategic location close to the border with Tanzania and controlling the southern approaches to Lake Tanganyika, 40 km by road to the north-west, where the port of Mpulungu is located. It had a population of about 20,000 in 2006. Under the name Abercorn, Mbala was a key outpost in British colonial control of this part of south-central Africa.

== History ==
A number of archaeological sites in the area (such as at Kalambo Falls) provides a record of human activity in the Mbala area over the past 300,000 years.

Before colonial times, Mbala was the village of Chief Zombe on the Lucheche River. It became the focus of British interest as a result of travels by the explorer David Livingstone, the first European to visit the area, in the 1860s. He was followed some years later by Verney Lovett Cameron who surveyed Lake Tanganyika. Livingstone inspired missionaries of the London Missionary Society to come in the 1880s to Niamkolo on the lake and Fwambo and Kawimbe on the plateau. These missions had links to the African Lakes Company which later set up in Mbala and Mpulungu. The area was ravaged by the slave trade during much of the 19th Century, and the African Lakes Company devoted some efforts to trying to stamp it out. This activity drew in the representative of the British Government in the region, Harry Johnston in Nyasaland, and decisions were taken to strengthen the imperial presence south of the lake and prevent other colonial powers establishing a foothold there.

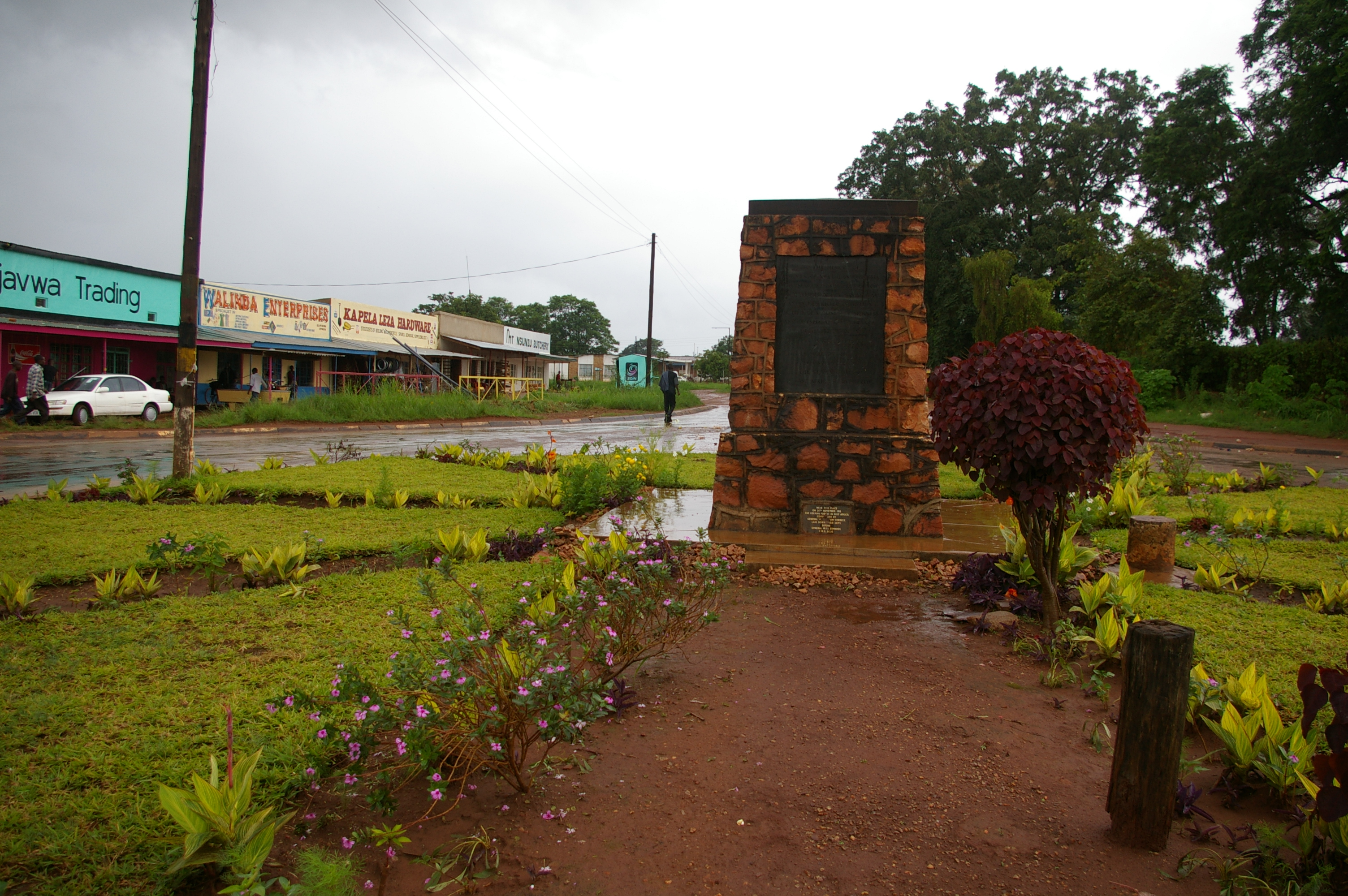
The Mbala War Memorial, where von Lettow-Vorbeck formally surrendered at the end of the First World War, designed by Sir Edwin Lutyens

As a result, the colonial era began in Mbala in 1893, earlier than in most other areas of what would become Zambia, when Hugh Marshall was sent by Johnston as the British Consul for the area. Marshall built a well-fortified boma at Chief Zombe's village and acted as Magistrate and Postmaster. In 1895 the British South Africa Company took over administration of the territory, called it North-Eastern Rhodesia, and the 'Zombe boma' became known as Abercorn, named after the company chairman. The site was favoured by British administrators as being healthy and having a pleasant climate with plenty of hunting and fishing. Until German East Africa was taken over by Britain in 1919 as Tanganyika, Abercorn and the smaller Chiengi boma on Lake Mweru were the most northerly outposts of British southern Africa. During World War I Mbala was a focus of the unsuccessful British military effort to defeat German General von Lettow-Vorbeck's German army, and British forces were concentrated there. After Germany's surrender in Europe, von Lettow-Vorbeck formally surrendered at Mbala on 25 November 1918, though he had agreed a ceasefire at the Chambeshi River 250 km south nine days earlier. The Mbala War Memorial marks the spot of the formal surrender about 2 km south-west of the centre of town. Following the surrender ceremony, the German troops were ordered to throw their weapons into Lake Chila.

Polish refugees from General Anders' army arrived there during World War 2 and were housed in a camp. A cemetery with Polish tombstones testifies to their past presence.

After Zambia's independence in 1964, the name of the town was changed back to Mbala.

Since its heyday as a colonial town in the 1950s and early 60s, Mbala has suffered some decline, and has lost out in development terms to the provincial capital, Kasama, and Mpika, which have better road and rail connections. Although the Mbala area has fertile soils and plenty of water, it is far from urban markets and transport costs limited the viability of most agricultural crops. Similarly, while it has tourist potential it is a bit too far off the main tourist routes and the poor state of the main highway and the lack of regular air services discourage visitors. There is one hotel but no resorts in the immediate area, the nearest being those in Nsumbu National Park such as Kasaba Bay, 100 km away, but there is no road link there − in fact the lack of a road serving the south-western side of the lake, which is mountainous, is a serious barrier to tourism or to any development there. Kalambo Falls is an attraction, but is not accessible throughout the rainy season. Wars and unrest on the eastern and northern shores of Lake Tanganyika have also hindered trade and tourism on the lake, which has not given Mbala and Mpulungu the advantages of their location. With recent steps towards resolution of those conflicts, the future may be brighter. The population was 16,963 in the 2000 census.

== Geography and transport ==
The town is at the edge of the plateau covering most of Zambia, at an elevation of 1670 m, about 900 m higher than Lake Tanganyika, which comes within 22 km (straight-line distance). The escarpment above the lake is the end of the Albertine Rift, the western branch of the East Africa Rift, and the Mbala area experiences occasional earth tremors. It is also said that the tiny but picturesque Lake Chila within the town experiences inexplicable drying out, and sudden flooding from underground springs, but this may be just a legend.

The second highest waterfall in Africa, Kalambo Falls lies about 40 km (by road) north west, and is formed where the Kalambo River comes over the Rift Valley escarpment.

Mbala is on the old Great North Road (M1 road) 165 km north of Kasama, and at one time was the end of that road. It has been paved and as of late 2008 is in poor condition, with large patches of pavement missing, and stretches have reverted to a dirt road. However, work crews were patching the road in late 2008, with one crew starting in Kasama, and the other starting from Mbala. Since it is the only paved highway access to the town and district, as well as to the port of Mpulungu, its poor condition is a major barrier to development in the area. Buses run daily from Mbala to Kasama and Lusaka, the capital.

Mbala is 25 km from the border with Tanzania and connected by a dry-season road to one of only two road border crossings between the two countries. It is not much used, the road beyond the border is a dirt track impassable in the rainy season.

The paved road which winds down the escarpment to Mpulungu (the M2 road) affords scenic views and passes close to Lunzua Falls. From Mpulungu the MV Liemba provides a boat service to other ports and countries on the lake. In the 19th century the lake was an important entry point to the territory of northern Zambia, by boat from Ujiji, which was reached by an overland trade route from the Indian Ocean coast near the island of Zanzibar.

Mbala has an airport but does not currently receive scheduled services, though it has a 2.6 km runway and was once a Zambian Air Force Base.

=== Climate ===
Mbala features a climate (Köppen: Aw/Cwa) with consistently mild temperatures and clear wet and dry seasons. The wet season, from November to April, experiences high humidity and significant rainfall, whereas the dry season, from May to October, is marked by minimal precipitation.

Climate data for Mbala (Mbala Airport) (1991–2020, extremes 1961–2020)
| Month | Jan | Feb | Mar | Apr | May | Jun | Jul | Aug | Sep | Oct | Nov | Dec | Year |
|---|---|---|---|---|---|---|---|---|---|---|---|---|---|
| Record high °C (°F) | 30.0 (86.0) | 31.6 (88.9) | 32.5 (90.5) | 33.4 (92.1) | 31.4 (88.5) | 31.6 (88.9) | 31.5 (88.7) | 33.4 (92.1) | 34.5 (94.1) | 37.0 (98.6) | 33.4 (92.1) | 33.3 (91.9) | 37.0 (98.6) |
| Mean daily maximum °C (°F) | 24.6 (76.3) | 25.1 (77.2) | 25.9 (78.6) | 26.0 (78.8) | 26.5 (79.7) | 25.9 (78.6) | 25.5 (77.9) | 27.1 (80.8) | 29.0 (84.2) | 29.2 (84.6) | 27.0 (80.6) | 25.3 (77.5) | 26.4 (79.5) |
| Daily mean °C (°F) | 19.8 (67.6) | 20.1 (68.2) | 20.6 (69.1) | 20.5 (68.9) | 19.9 (67.8) | 18.6 (65.5) | 18.1 (64.6) | 19.7 (67.5) | 21.6 (70.9) | 22.3 (72.1) | 21.3 (70.3) | 20.2 (68.4) | 20.2 (68.4) |
| Mean daily minimum °C (°F) | 15.0 (59.0) | 15.0 (59.0) | 15.3 (59.5) | 15.0 (59.0) | 13.3 (55.9) | 11.2 (52.2) | 10.6 (51.1) | 12.2 (54.0) | 14.1 (57.4) | 15.3 (59.5) | 15.5 (59.9) | 15.1 (59.2) | 14.0 (57.2) |
| Record low °C (°F) | 8.8 (47.8) | 10.4 (50.7) | 9.6 (49.3) | 7.8 (46.0) | 8.4 (47.1) | 5.6 (42.1) | 5.2 (41.4) | 5.5 (41.9) | 9.5 (49.1) | 10.0 (50.0) | 6.6 (43.9) | 7.8 (46.0) | 5.2 (41.4) |
| Average precipitation mm (inches) | 268.2 (10.56) | 238.0 (9.37) | 186.4 (7.34) | 81.0 (3.19) | 11.1 (0.44) | 0.0 (0.0) | 0.0 (0.0) | 0.1 (0.00) | 1.8 (0.07) | 27.9 (1.10) | 99.8 (3.93) | 228.2 (8.98) | 1,142.5 (44.98) |
| Average relative humidity (%) | 83 | 82 | 80 | 76 | 71 | 64 | 53 | 50 | 49 | 54 | 69 | 80 | 68 |
| Mean monthly sunshine hours | 130.2 | 134.4 | 170.5 | 213.0 | 285.2 | 300.0 | 306.9 | 303.8 | 273.0 | 235.6 | 189.0 | 142.6 | 2,684.2 |
| Percentage possible sunshine | 34 | 39 | 46 | 60 | 79 | 87 | 86 | 84 | 76 | 62 | 51 | 37 | 61 |
Source 1: NOAA (sun 1961–1990)
Source 2: DWD (humidity 1950-1980)

== Attractions ==
- Moto Moto Museum — a museum of Mambwe/Lungu culture, named after the French Catholic bishop Joseph Dupont, nicknamed Moto Moto.
- Mutomolo harvest thanksgiving ceremony at Lake Chila even military training also a site of attraction it has a better view
- Uringa Pans
