= Uganda Police Force =

Law enforcement agency

Uganda Police Force Poliisi ya Uganda
- Common name: Uganda Police
- Abbreviation: UPF
- Motto: Protect and Serve

Agency overview
- Formed: 1906

Jurisdictional structure
- Operations jurisdiction: UG
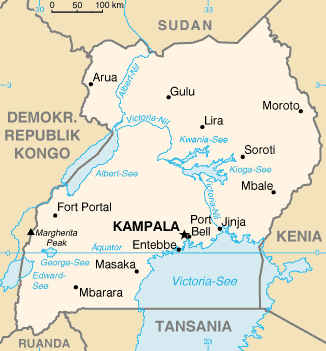
- Map of Uganda showing Uganda National Police Jurisdiction
- Area: 241,038 square kilometres (93,065 sq mi)
- Population: 35,918,900
- Legal jurisdiction: Uganda
- General nature: Civilian police

Operational structure
- Headquarters: UP Headquarters; Katalima Road; Naguru, Kampala
- Agency executives: Abbas Byakagaba, Inspector General of Police; James Ochaya, Deputy Inspector General of Police
- Parent agency: Uganda Ministry of Internal Affairs
- Units: Administration; Counter Terrorism; Criminal Investigation; Human Resource Development & Management; Information & Communication Technology; Interpol; Kampala Metropolitan Police; Logistics and Engineering; Oil and Gas; Operations; Political Commissariat; Research, Planning & Development; Special Duties; Welfare
- Districts: Districts of Uganda

Website
- upf.go.ug

The Uganda Police Force is the national police force of Uganda. The head of the force is called the Inspector General of Police (IGP). The current IGP is Abbas Byakagaba. Byakagaba replaced former IGP, Martins Okoth Ochola on 18 May 2024. Recruitment to the forces is done annually.

== History ==
The Uganda Police Force was established in 1906 by the British administration. At that time, it was referred to as the Uganda Armed Constabulary with the primary responsibility of quelling "riots and unrest."

On 25 May 1906, then Captain (later Brigadier General) William F.S Edwards, DSO, arrived in Uganda and became the first Inspector General of the Uganda Protectorate Police. Brigadier General William FS Edwards was regarded as a "stern disciplinarian and an excellent administrator." He held the IGP appointment until 1908, but held a position in administration up to the time of his retirement in 1922.

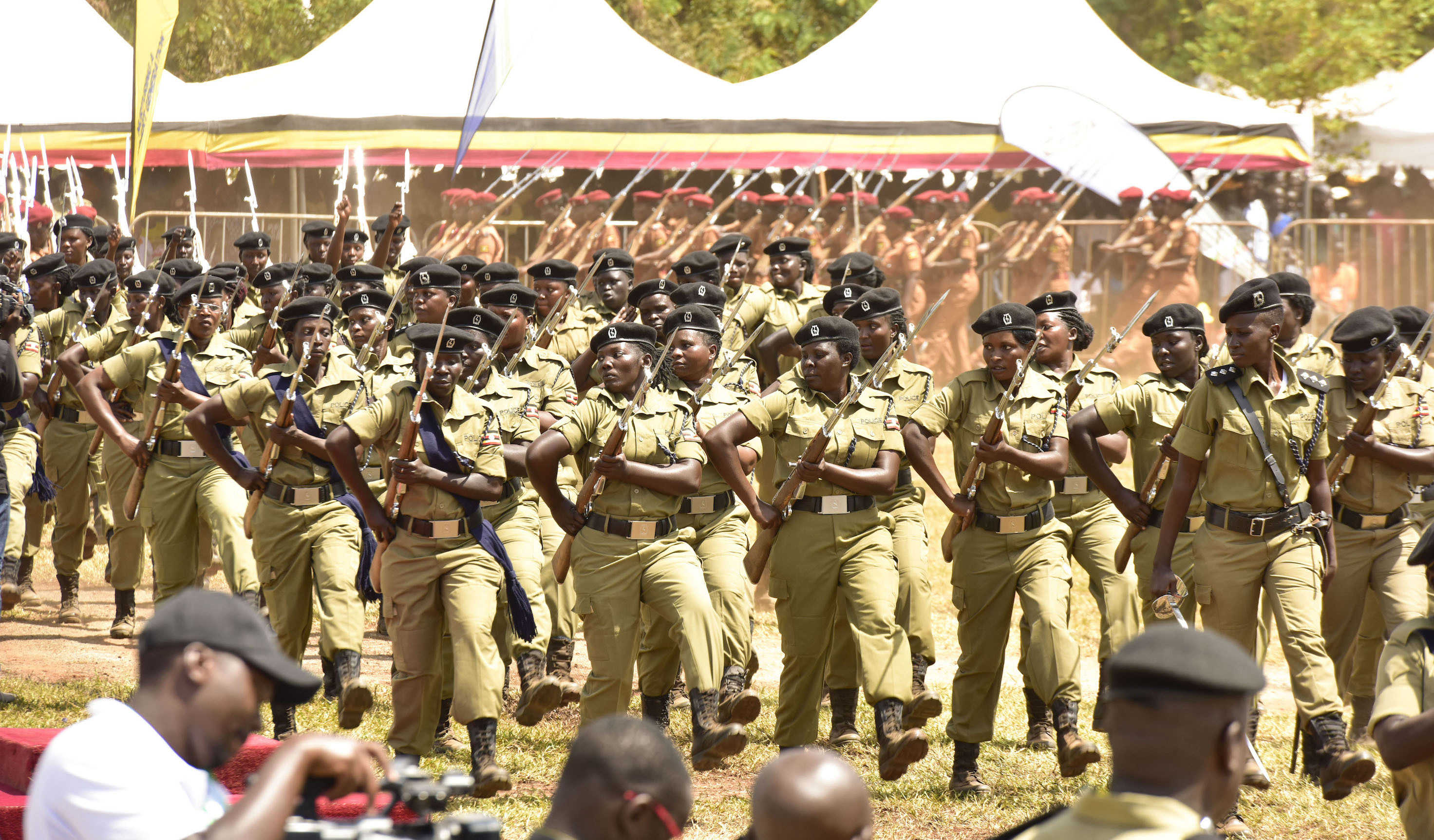
WOMEN OF UGANDAN POLICE

The size of the force was reduced from 8,000 to 3,000 in 1986. Up until April 2014, the official name of the government agency was Uganda Police Force. On that day, the IGP publicly announced the name change to Uganda National Police.

== Equipment ==
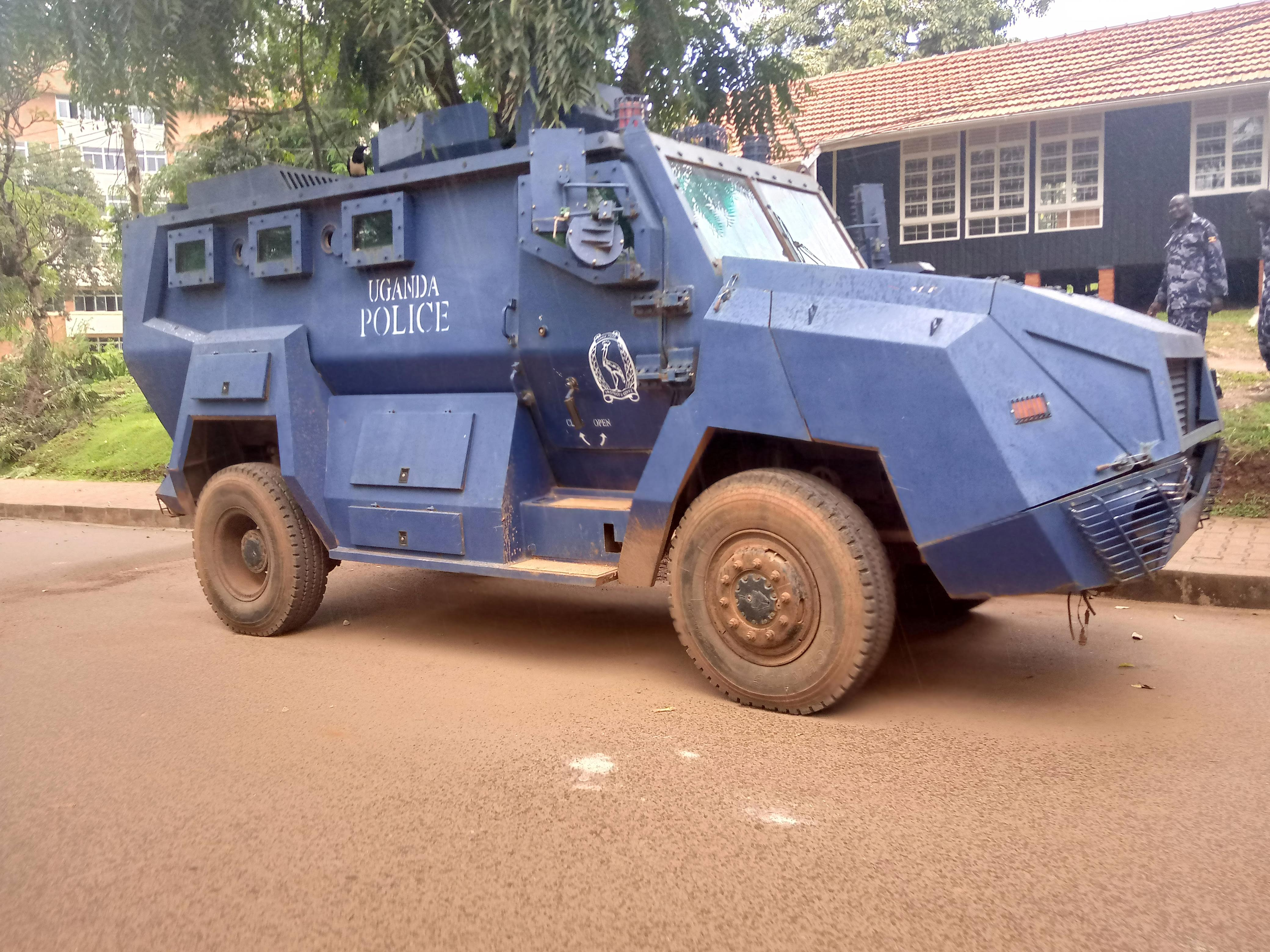
Armoured vehicle of Uganda National Police

In 2015, the police agency took delivery of three new aircraft, including one PZL W-3A Sokół helicopter; one AgustaWestland AW109 GrandNew helicopter; and one fixed wing aircraft.

== Firearms ==
- Jericho 941- counter-terrorism officers
- Remington 870 12 Gauge
- AK-47 7.62x39mm
- Federal Riot Gun- Deployed by riot police

== Notable people ==
Below are some notable people who have served in the Uganda National Police:

- Joshua Cheptegei - Olympian long-distance runner
- Luke Kercan Ofungi - Long serving former IGP
- General Edward Katumba Wamala - First Ugandan military officer to serve as Inspector General
- Elizabeth Muwanga - First woman to join the police force in 1980

Below are some notable people who have served in the original Uganda Protectorate Police, Uganda Police and British East Africa Police:

- Brigadier General William FS Edwards - first Inspector General of the Uganda Protectorate Police, first IG of the Uganda Police and the IG of then British East Africa Police.

== Controversies ==
Uganda police force has had a number of incidences that have been cited as controversial for example use of force against the opposition political parties like FDC and NUP. It has also brutally manhandled leaders like Kiiza Besigye, Erias Lukwago, Betty Nambooze and Bobi Wine.

These incidents have led to the organisation being identified as partisan and intolerant to dissent.

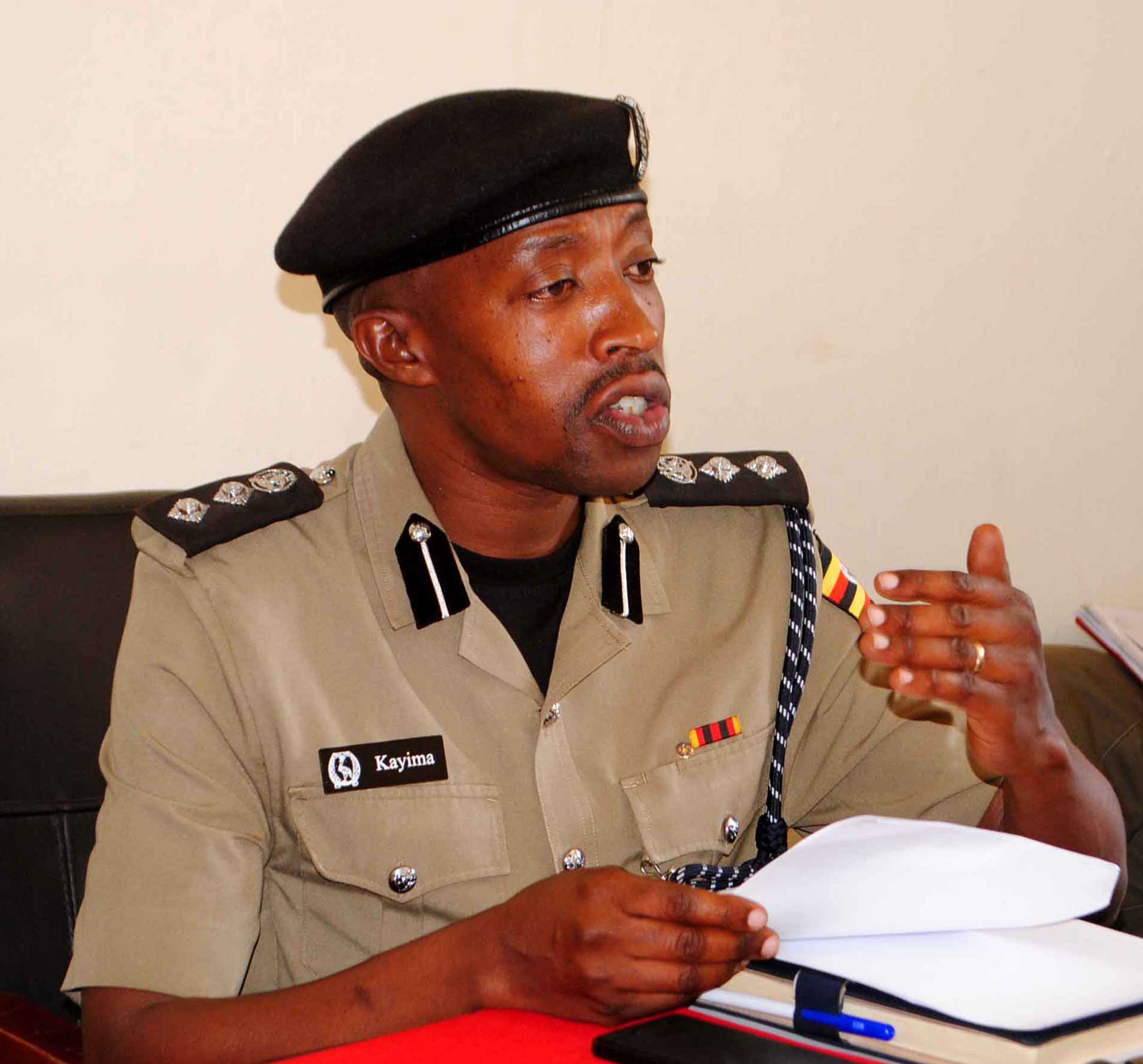
EMILIAN KAYIMA KAFEERO

== See also ==
- Joint Anti-Terrorist Task Force of Uganda
