= Tumuheirwe Florence =

Ugandan human rights activist (born 1963)

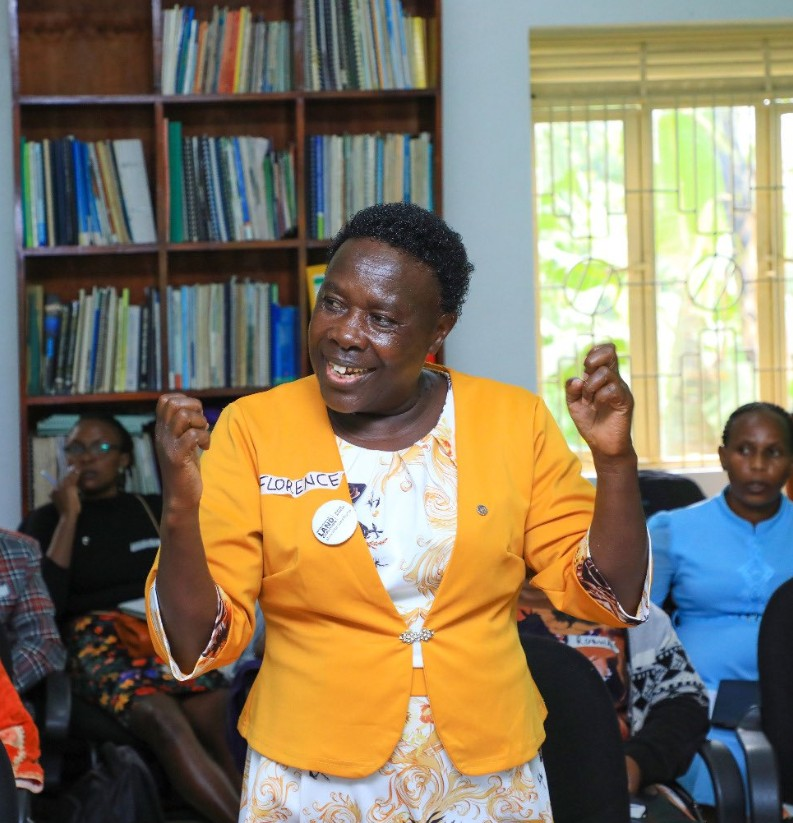
- Tumuheirwe Florence in 2023
- Born: 5 March 1963 (age 63); Rweikonko village, Rukiga District, Uganda
- Occupations: Human rights activist; Executive director, Kigezi Women in Development
- Organizations: Kigezi Women in Development (KWID); Forum for Women in Democracy (FOWODE); CSBAG

Tumuheirwe Florence (born 5 March 1963) is a Ugandan human rights activist. She is currently the executive director of Kigezi Women in Development (KWID), a women-led organization established in 1996 operating in Kigezi sub-region, in South Western Uganda. Her work focuses on gender equality, health advocacy, climate justice, economic justice, and environmental conservation.

== Background and education ==
Florence was born in Rweikonko village, Kamwezi sub-county, Rukiga District. She had her secondary education at Bweranyangi Girls' Senior Secondary School and holds qualifications in economics and community development, with specialized training in psychosocial support, reproductive health, and advocacy.

== Career and activism ==
=== Kigezi Women in Development ===
Florence is the founder and executive director of Kigezi Women in Development. Under her leadership, KWID has implemented programs in partnership with organizations like Amref Health Africa, Ministry of Water and Environment (Uganda), Girls Not Brides, Click Rukiga, Deutsche Gesellschaft für Internationale Zusammenarbeit - GIZ Uganda, ActionAid, Women of Uganda Network (WOUGNET), CSBAG and Forum for Women in Democracy (FOWODE). Collaborating with Amref Health Africa, she led the Health Systems Advocacy Partnership Project aimed at improving healthcare access, particularly in maternal health and family planning.

Florence led campaigns in Kabale to increase the availability of long-term family planning services in lower health centers, address low male participation in family planning by conducting community sensitization programs she advocated for hands-on training for university students in sustainable practices to combat climate change. In 2018, she developed and delivered petition Loy Zikampereza, the speaker of Kabale district local government, to improve Maziba Health Center IV. The petition was signed by 2306 people who use the health facility. The district approved four hundred million (400 M) for the renovation and construction of staff quarters.

=== Forum for Women in Democracy ===
Florence worked for Forum for Women in Democracy (FOWODE) as a field officer for the Kabale field office from 2010 to 2017. She was a critic of regressive taxation (e.g., value-added tax on essentials like sugar and kerosene), stating that such policies disproportionately harm low-income women. In 2014, she was recognized for her contribution during the Agriculture Tax campaign. She collected over 1,000 farmers; signatures, and was the lead petitioner who submitted the 1 million farmers' petition to Rebecca Kadaga, speaker of Parliament, on behalf of CSBAG in 2014.

She continues to lead accountability efforts in public services, especially in governance, education, and healthcare delivery. She is also a frequent commentator on radio and television, sensitizing communities on health rights, education, gender equity, climate change, and fiscal justice. She also mentors female journalists to amplify marginalized voices.

Florence is currently leading KWID in a partnership with Kabale University and Mountains of the Moon University. implementing the Strengthening Smallholder Farmer Resilience to climate change through joint learning, development and evaluation of Contextualized Solutions case of the Rwenzori and Kigezi highland Regions of Uganda (SFR2CC) project. Under the SFR2CC project, she appealed for hands-on trainings for university students to equip them with transferable skills.
