= Civil society organization =

A civil society organization (CSO) is a group of people that operates in the community in a way that is distinct from both government and business. Please see:

- Civil society
- Nonprofit organization
- Non-governmental organization
