= LGBTQ-affirming religious groups =

Religious groups that affirm LGBTQ+ rights and relationships

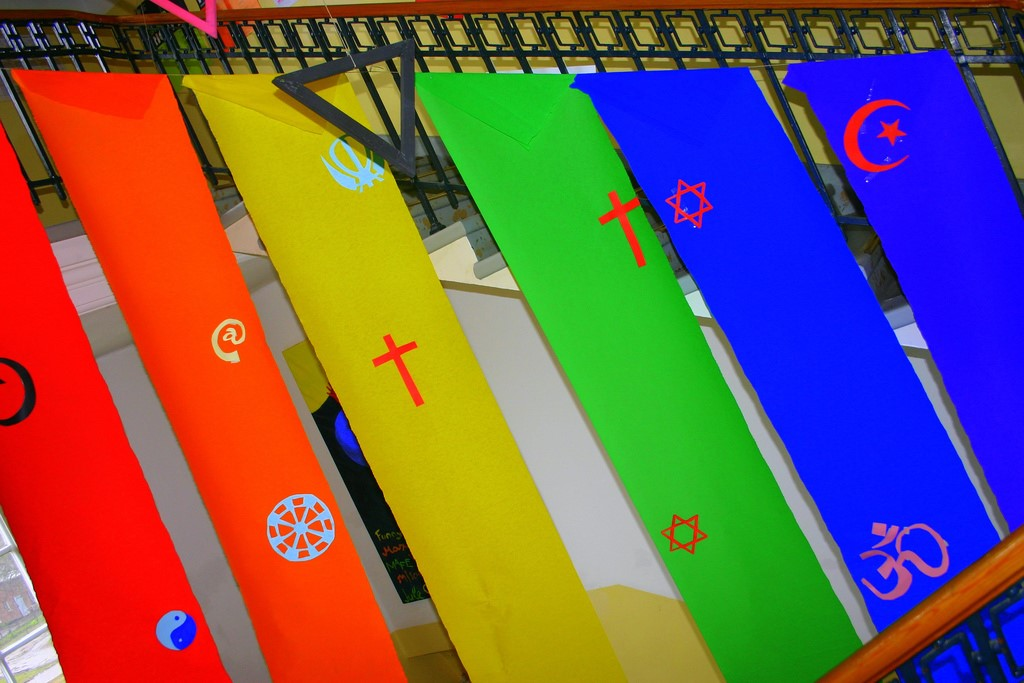
Symbols of the world's largest religions displayed on rainbow flags at the Queer Easter, Germany

Lesbian, gay, bisexual, transgender and queer (LGBTQ)-affirming religious groups are religious groups that welcome LGBTQ people and affirm LGBTQ rights and relationships. LGBTQ-affirming religious groups including entire religions as well as sects, lineages, denominations, or traditions. They also include individual religious communities, organizations, and institutions.

Religions intersect with LGBTQ people through a range of beliefs, practices, and organizational policies that shape experiences of romantic orientation and relationships including same-sex couples, sexual orientation and acts including homosexuality, gender identity and expression, and participation in social and religious life. The relationship between religion and sexual orientation, romantic orientation, and gender identity varies widely across traditions and communities. In many cases, understandings of romance, gender, and sexuality do not align with modern Western LGBTQ categories, reflecting different cultural and historical perspectives. Historic and cross cultural elements of religious and cultural incorporation of non-heterosexual identities can still be identified in traditions that have survived into the modern era, such as the Berdache, Hijra, Muxe, bugi genders, Fa'afafine, Kathoey, and Xanith.

Within both historic and contemporary religious traditions, views on LGBTQ people vary widely. These range from full support from LGBTQ-affirming religious groups, including affirmation of diverse sexual and romantic orientations, gender identities and expressions, and same-sex marriage, to opposition, including condemnation that can extend from social exclusion to violence. Some religions and traditions may affirm certain members of the LGBTQ community while rejecting others, for example supporting gay rights while opposing transgender rights, or accepting gender diversity while condemning same-sex relationships.

Historically, some cultures and religions accommodated, institutionalized, revered and/or tolerated same-sex relationships and non-heterosexual identities; such mythologies and traditions can be found in numerous religions around the world. In support of LGBTQ people, many religious and spiritual communities look to sacred teachings, texts, traditions, customs, practices, insight, and cultural practices for guidance.

== Scholarship on LGBTQ people and religion ==
Attitudes toward homosexuality have been found to be determined not only by personal religious beliefs, but by the interaction of those beliefs with the predominant national religious context—even for people who are less religious or who do not share their local dominant religious context. Scholars have applied cultural sociology as well as religious context-based effects to explain public opinion variations among nations.

Within the social sciences, religious practice and institutions have been studied for their role in orienting heteronormative societies in how they relate to LGBTQ people and same-sex couples, and their abilities to be functional beings in societal contexts.

== Abrahamic religions ==
Abrahamic religions (namely Judaism, Samaritanism, Christianity, the Baháʼí Faith, and Islam) have traditionally affirmed and endorsed a patriarchal and heteronormative approach towards human sexuality, favouring exclusively penetrative vaginal intercourse between men and women within the boundaries of marriage over all other forms of human sexual activity, including autoeroticism, masturbation, oral sex, non-penetrative and non-heterosexual sexual intercourse (all of which have been labeled as "sodomy" at various times), believing and teaching that such behaviors are forbidden because they are considered sinful, and further compared to or derived from the behavior of the alleged residents of Sodom and Gomorrah. However, the status of LGBTQ people in early Christianity and early Islam is debated.

In modern times, LGBTQ-affirming Christian denominations cite several reasons for their support of LGBTQ rights and relationships. Some argue that passages in the Bible never discuss LGBTQ relationships as they are known today. Others reject the belief in biblical inerrancy citing translation errors, biases, and other modern reinterpretations of biblical passages such as those seemingly supportive of slavery. Others argue that God created LGBTQ people, LGBTQ relationships produce good-fruit, and those relationships are therefore good or the fact that Jesus never addressed homosexuality but focused on messages of love. Similar interpretations have been applied to LGBTQ rights within Islam and Judaism.

=== Christianity ===
Several denominations within Christianity accept LGBTQ members, affirm LGBTQ relationships, and permit the ordination of openly LGBTQ candidates for their ministries. In addition to denominations many independent churches support LGBTQ members.

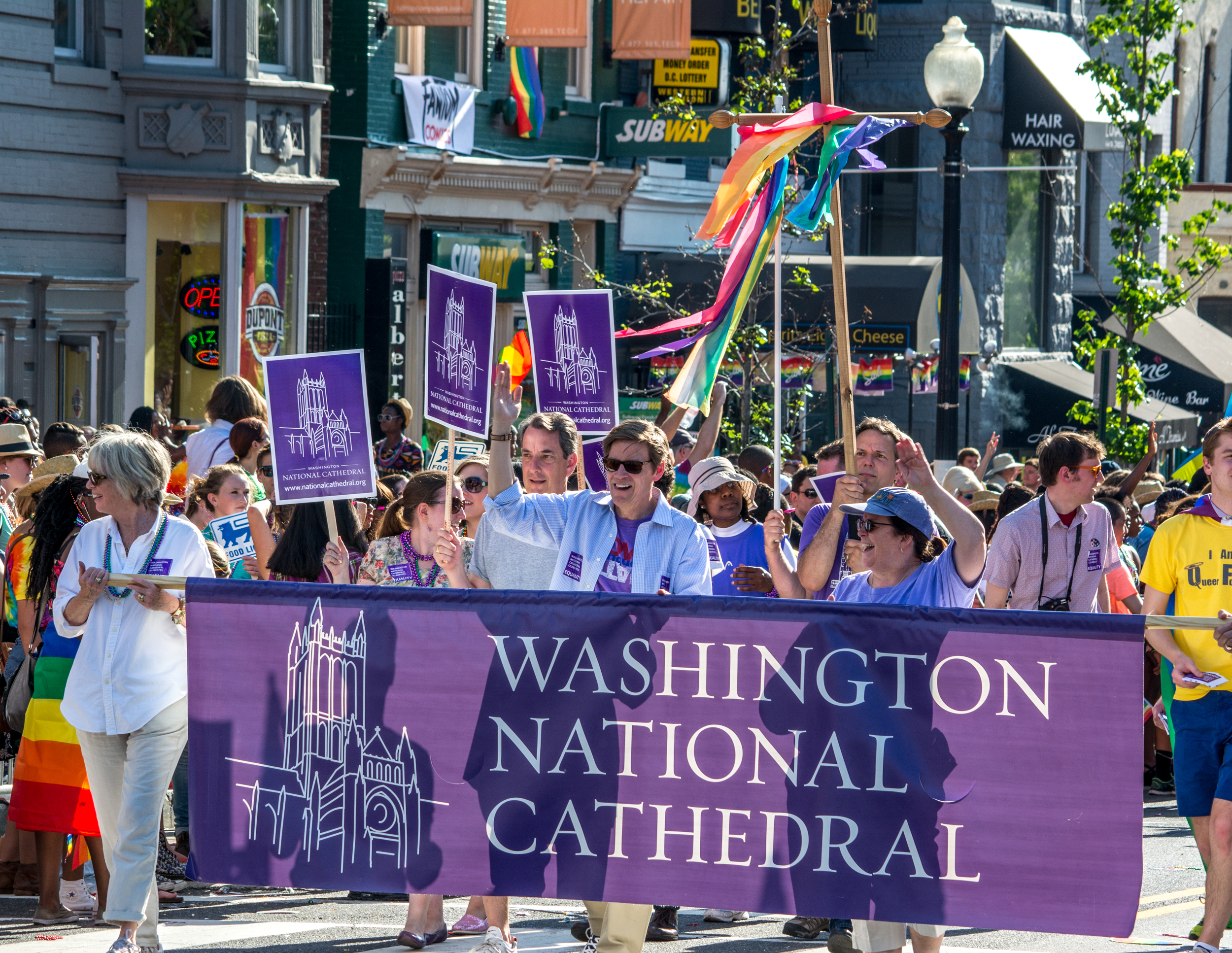
Washington National Cathedral (Episcopal Church in the United States) at D.C. Gay Pride (2014)

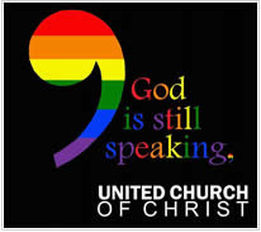
United Church of Christ's motto which expresses its support for LGBTQ rights

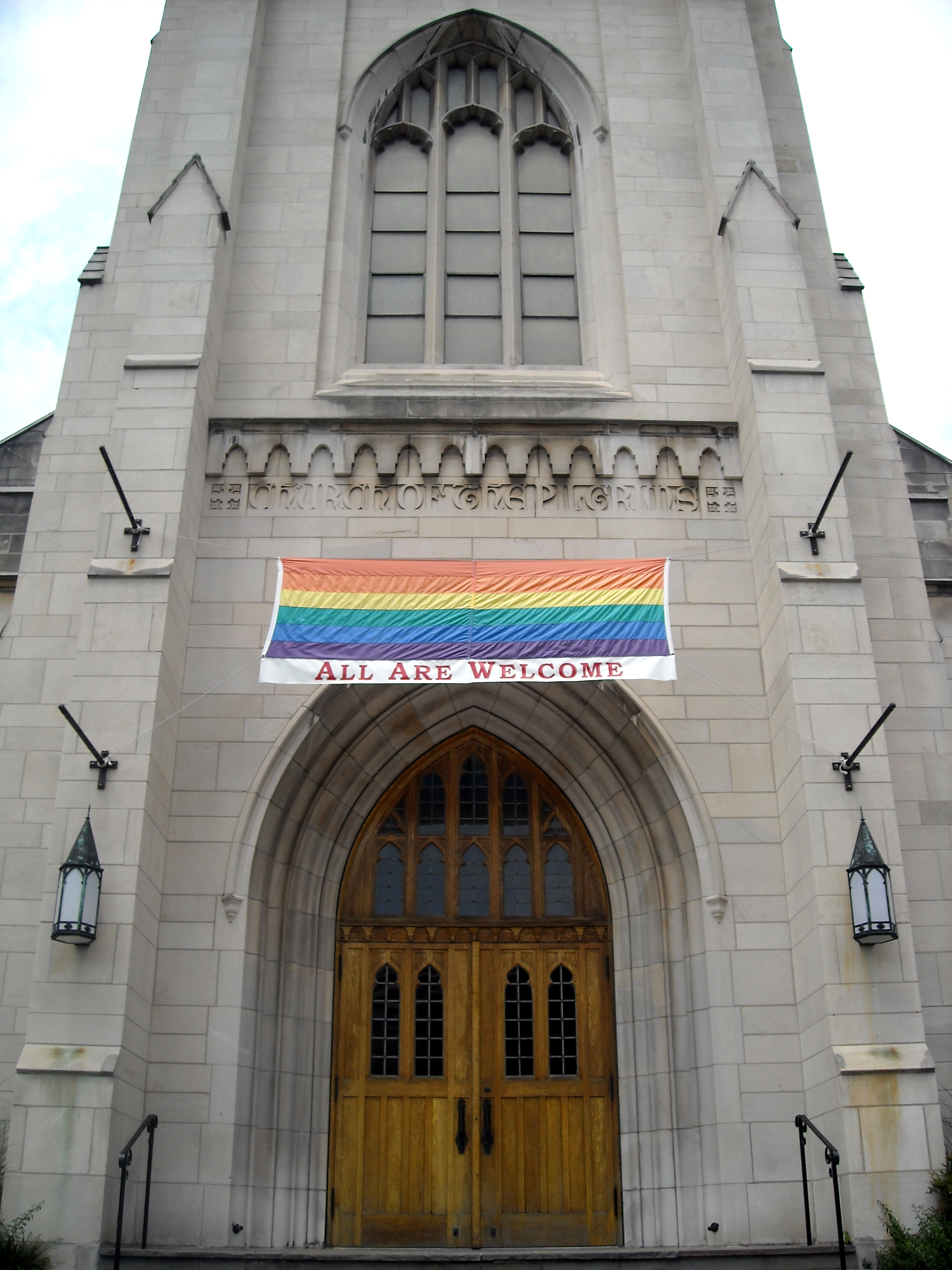
Church of the Pilgrims in Washington, D.C., indicating its support for LGBTQ rights

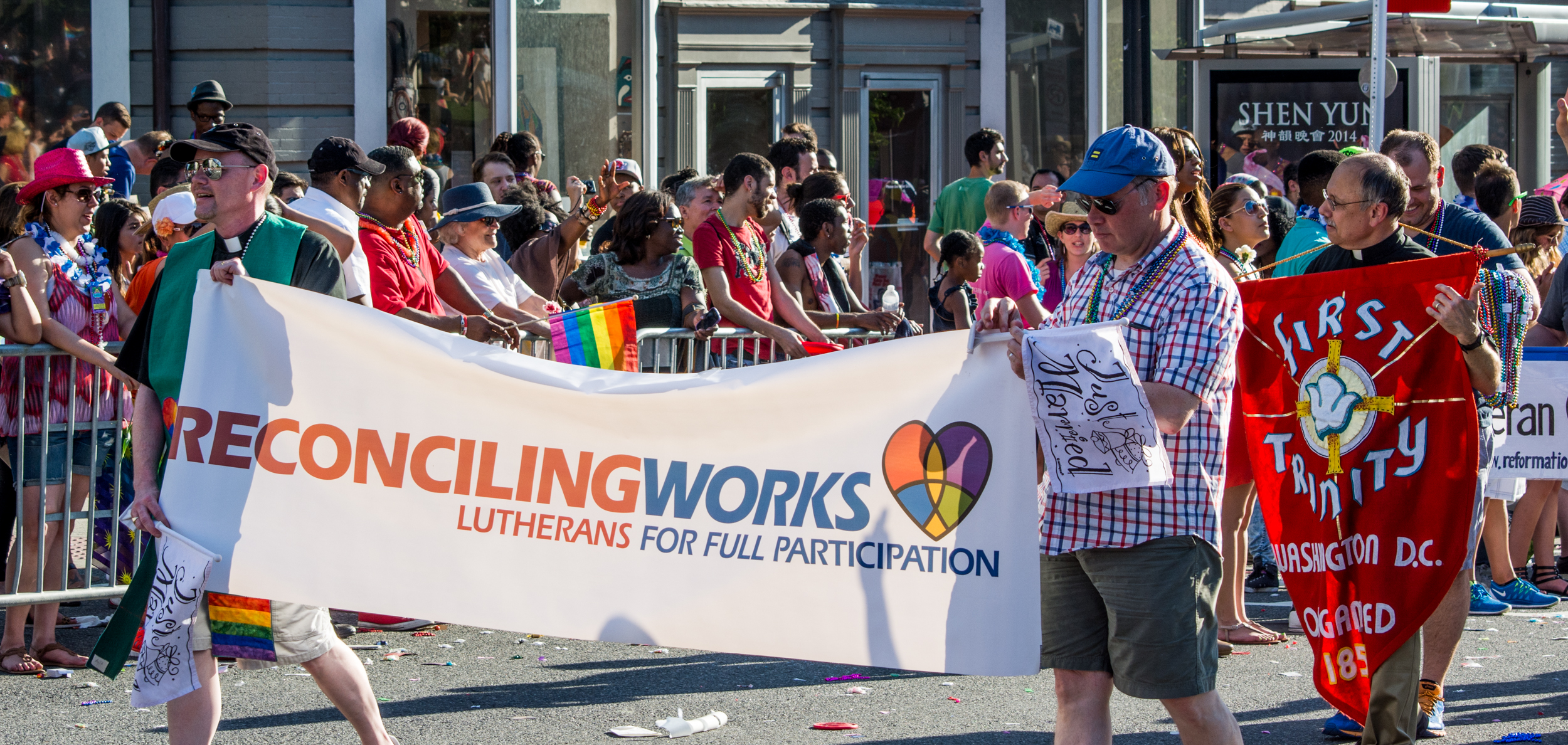
ReconcilingWorks, an LGBTQ-affirming Lutheran organization in North America, at DC Capital Pride in 2014

The European Forum of LGBTI+ Christian Groups was founded in 1982 by various national associations. As of 2026, it has 40 member associations in 20 countries.

==== Denominations with strong LGBTQ support ====
- The Episcopal Church (United States): At its 2015 triennial General Convention, the Episcopal Church voted overwhelmingly to allow religious weddings for same-sex couples. Many dioceses had previously allowed their priests to officiate at civil same-sex marriage ceremonies, but the church had not yet changed its own laws on marriage. The church law replaced the terms "husband" and "wife" with "the couple". Individual members of the clergy may still decline to perform same-sex weddings. Previously, the Episcopal Church had voted to allow a "generous pastoral response" for couples in same-sex civil unions, domestic partnerships, and marriages.
- The United Church of Christ: In 2005, the General Synod adopted a resolution supporting equal access to marriage for all couples, regardless of gender. This resolution encouraged (but did not require) individual congregations to adopt policies supporting equal marriage rights for same-sex couples.
- Lutheranism (See Homosexuality and Lutheranism):
  - The Evangelical Lutheran Church in America: During its 2009 Churchwide Assembly, the ELCA passed a resolution by a vote of 619–402 reading "Resolved, that the ELCA commit itself to finding ways to allow congregations that choose to do so to recognize, support and hold publicly accountable lifelong, monogamous, same-gender relationships."
  - The Evangelical Lutheran Church in Canada permits same-sex marriages.
  - The Evangelical Lutheran Church in Denmark: In 2012, the Danish parliament voted to make same-sex marriages mandatory in all state churches. Individual priests may refuse to perform the ceremony, but the local bishop must organize a replacement.
  - The Church of Iceland permits same-sex marriages.
  - The Lutheran Evangelical Church in Italy permits same-sex marriages.
- The Church of Sweden: On 22 October 2009, the governing board of the Church of Sweden voted 176–62 in favour of allowing its priests to wed same-sex couples in new gender-neutral church ceremonies, including the use of the term marriage.
- The Church of Norway: In 2013, the bishops announced that they would allow "gay couples to receive church blessings for their civil unions..." In 2017, the Church of Norway decided to allow same-sex marriages to be performed in churches.
- The Presbyterian Church (USA), the largest Presbyterian group in the United States, voted to allow same-gender marriages on 19 June 2014. This vote allows pastors to perform marriages in jurisdictions where same-sex marriages are legally recognized. Additionally, the Assembly voted to send out a proposed amendment to the Book of Order, changing the description of marriage from "between a man and a woman" to "between two people, traditionally between a man and a woman." This amendment needed to be approved by a majority of the 172 Presbyteries to take effect. On 17 March 2015, the New Jersey–based Presbytery of the Palisade became the 87th presbytery to approve the ratification, making the change official.
- The Metropolitan Community Church performs same-sex marriages. The MCC was founded to support LGBTQ Christians. In 1968, MCC founder Rev. Troy Perry officiated the first public same-sex marriage ceremony in the United States, though it was not legally recognized at the time.
- The United Church of Canada: The General Council of the church accepts same-sex marriages. However, each individual congregation is free to develop its own marriage policies.

==== Denominations with mixed support ====
- Anglicanism (See Homosexuality and Anglicanism): The Anglican Communion is divided over the issue of homosexuality. The more liberal provinces that are open to changing Church doctrine on marriage in order to allow for same-sex unions include Brazil, Canada, New Zealand, Scotland, South India, South Africa, the US and Wales.
  - The Anglican Church in New Zealand: In 2014, the "General Synod passe[d] a resolution that will create a pathway towards the blessing of same-gender relationships, while upholding the traditional doctrine of marriage...It therefore says clergy should be permitted [while the blessings are being developed] 'to recognise in public worship' a same-gender civil union or state marriage of members of their faith community..." On a diocesan level, the Dunedin Diocese already permits a blessing for relationships irrespective of the partners' gender. "Blessings of same-sex relationships are offered in line with [Dunedin] Diocesan Policy and with the bishop's permission." In the Diocese of Auckland, a couple was "joined in a civil union at the inner-Auckland Anglican church of St Matthews in the City in 2005." The larger Anglican Church in Aotearoa, New Zealand and Polynesia allows priests to bless same-sex civil marriage or civil unions, but not to carry out same-sex marriage ceremonies in an Anglican church.
  - The Anglican Church of Australia: The church does not have an official position on homosexuality. In 2013, the Diocese of Perth voted to recognise same-sex relationships.The Social Responsibilities Committee of the Anglican Church Southern Queenslandsupported "the ability for same-sex couples to have a legally recognised ceremony to mark their union." The Diocese of Gippsland has appointed clergy in a "same-sex partnership." St. Andrew's Church in Subiaco, in Perth, has publicly blessed a same-sex union. In 2020, the church's highest court, the Appellate Tribunal, ruled that a diocese may authorise the blessing of persons in same-sex unions.
  - The Anglican Church of Canada: In 2016, the Anglican Church of Canada voted to permit same-sex marriage after a vote recount. The motion must pass a second reading in 2019 to become church law. The dioceses of Niagara and Ottawa, both of which already allowed blessing rites, announced after the 2016 vote that they would immediately allow same-sex marriages. In 2019, the General Synod approved a resolution which allows each provincial synod and diocese to bless or perform same-sex marriages if they choose to do so. The Diocese of Toronto has specifically allowed churches to perform same-sex marriages as of mid-November 2016 when Archbishop Colin Johnson issued the Pastoral Guidelines for Same-Sex Marriages. In brief, the guidelines stated that such marriages could proceed in the Church "at the pastoral discretion of the Bishop and with the agreement of local clergy".At the same General Synod, a resolution, called "A Word to the Church", was approved that recognised that a diocese may choose to perform same-sex marriages.
  - The Anglican Church of Southern Africa: Clergy are not permitted to enter in same-sex marriages or civil unions, but the church "tolerates same-sex relationships if they are celibate". Archbishop Thabo Makgoba, the current Anglican Primate, is "one among few church leaders in Africa to support same-sex marriage". The Diocese of Saldanha Bay has proposed a blessing for same-sex unions. Famous anti-apartheid activist and theologian Desmond Tutu, who was an archbishop within the Anglican Church of Southern Africa, was a major advocate for gay rights and religious acceptance of LGBTQ individuals.
  - The Church in Wales: Clergy are allowed to enter into same-sex civil partnerships, and there is no requirement of sexual abstinence. In 2015, a majority of the General Synod of the Church in Wales voted for same-sex marriage. Also, the "Church has published prayers that may be said with a couple following the celebration of a civil partnership or civil marriage." In September 2021, the Church in Wales voted to "formally bless same-sex couples" instead (by way of debate and compromise) – but still not legally recognising same-sex marriage within titles of the Church officially.
  - The Church of England: Since 2005, clergy are permitted to enter into same-sex civil partnerships, but are requested to give assurances of following the Bishops' guidelines on human sexuality. In 2013, the House of Bishops announced that priests in same-sex civil unions may serve as bishops. As for ceremonies in church, "clergy in the Church of England are permitted to offer prayers of support on a pastoral basis for people in same-sex relationships; many priests already bless same-sex unions on an unofficial basis. Some congregations may offer "prayers for a same-sex commitment" or may "offer services of thanksgiving following a civil marriage ceremony."
  - The Scottish Episcopal Church: Since 2008, St. Mary's Cathedral in Glasgow has offered blessing services for same-sex civil partnerships. The Scottish Episcopal Church agreed to bless same-sex marriages in 2015. In 2016, the General Synod voted to amend the marriage canon to include same-sex couples. The proposal was approved in a second reading in 2017, and same-sex marriages may be legally performed in the Scottish Episcopal Church.
  - Episcopal Anglican Church of Brazil voted, by an overwhelming majority, to amend to define marriage as a 'lifelong union between two people, regardless of sexual orientation or gender identity' thus permitting same-sex marriages within the church.
- Baptists (See: Homosexuality and Baptist churches): Some Baptist associations do not have official beliefs about marriage in a confession of faith and invoke congregationalism to leave the choice to each church to decide. This is the case of American Baptist Churches USA, Progressive National Baptist Convention (USA), Cooperative Baptist Fellowship (USA), National Baptist Convention, USA and the Baptist Union of Great Britain. Some Baptist associations support same-sex marriage. This is the case of the Alliance of Baptists (USA), the Canadian Association for Baptist Freedoms, the Aliança de Batistas do Brasil, the Fraternidad de Iglesias Bautistas de Cuba, and the Association of Welcoming and Affirming Baptists(international).
- The Latter Day Saint movement
  - The Community of Christ: In 2013, the Community of Christ officially decided to extend the sacrament of marriage to same-sex couples where gay marriage is legal, to provide covenant commitment ceremonies where it is not legal, and to allow the ordination of people in same-sex relationships to the priesthood. However, this is only in the United States, Canada, and Australia. The church does have a presence in countries where homosexuality is punishable by law, even death, so for the protection of the members in those nations, full inclusion of LGBTQ individuals is limited to the countries where this is not the case. Individual viewpoints do vary, and some congregations may be more welcoming than others. Furthermore, the church has proponents for support of both traditional marriage and same-sex marriages. The First Presidency and the Council of Twelve will need to approve policy revisions recommended by the USA National Conference.
- Lutheranism (See Homosexuality and Lutheranism):
  - The Evangelical Church in Germany (EKD): The EKD is a federation of twenty Protestant churches in Germany. The blessing of same-sex unions is allowed in many constituent member churches.
  - The Evangelical Lutheran Church of Finland: The church does not currently allow same-sex marriages to be legally officiated in churches. However, couples may enter in a civil partnership and "the couple may organise prayers with a priest or other church workers and invited guests. This may take place on church premises – but practice varies from parish to parish." After a civil same-sex marriage, couples may request the same prayers in church. "All of the bishops have taken the position that it is possible to hold prayer services to bless same-sex couples."
  - The Union of Evangelical Churches in Germany allows for the blessing of same-sex marriages.
- Methodism (See Homosexuality and Methodism):
  - The Methodist Church of Great Britain permits same-sex marriage. Clergy are allowed to enter into same-sex civil partnerships or marriages.
  - The Methodist Church of New Zealand: Clergy may enter into same-sex unions and permits same-sex marriages.
  - The Methodist Church of Southern Africa: In Southern Africa, the Methodist Church has allowed clergy in same-sex relationships, but they are not permitted to be in a same-sex marriage. The Methodist "Church allowed [clergy] to be in a homosexual relationship whilst being a minister, and allowed [clergy] to stay in the Church's manse with [their] partner, but drew the line at recognising [their] same-sex marriage." "The Methodist Church 'tolerates homosexuals' and even accepts same-sex relationships (as long as such relationships are not solemnised by marriage)..."
  - Many of the Protestant Church of Switzerland churches permit blessings for same-sex couples.
  - The Evangelical Methodist Church in Argentina allows "the freedom to accompany homosexual couples" in ministry.
  - The Evangelical Church in Uruguay, a Methodist denomination, has "resolved that pastors that wish to minister to homosexuals may do so freely". Each pastor is free to provide blessing services for same-sex unions if he or she chooses to do so.

==== Other Christian denominations and organizations ====
- National Council of Churches in India leadership has expressed support for LGBTQ rights.
- The Old Catholic Church: A group of churches which separated from Roman Catholicism over the issue of papal authority.
  - Many American Old Catholic churches perform same-sex marriage ceremonies including American Apostolic Church, Catholic Apostolic Church in North America, Ecumenical Catholic Communion, American Catholic Church in the United States, American Catholic Church Diocese, and the National Catholic Church of America.
  - The Union of Utrecht of the Old Catholic Churches is a federation of six European Old Catholic organizations, four of which allow same-sex marriage ceremonies.
- Presbyterianism and Reformed Christianity (See also Homosexuality and Presbyterianism):
  - The Church of Scotland: In 2015, the Kirk voted to allow congregations to ordain clergy who enter into same-sex civil partnerships. The General Assembly voted to allow clergy in same-sex marriages in 2016. Then, the General Assembly approved draft legislation that would allow ministers of Word and Sacrament and deacons to marry same-sex couples if they wish for further consideration of the general assemble and membership.
  - In 2011, the United Reformed Church allowed blessings of same-sex couples. In July 2016, the United Reformed Church allowed same-sex marriage.
- Quakerism (See Homosexuality and Quakerism)
  - The Canadian Yearly Meeting supports the right of same-sex couples to marry.
  - Several American, British, and Australian Quaker groups bless same-sex marriages.
- United and uniting churches are mostly theologically liberal and often LGBTQ-affirming:
  - The United Protestant Church in Belgium permits same-sex marriage.
  - The Protestant Church of Switzerland is a group of 26 member churches. Several of its member churches permit prayer services and blessings of same-sex civil unions.
  - The Protestant Church in the Netherlands: The church has allowed the blessing of same-sex unions since 2001. This has included the blessing of same-sex unions as well as marriages.
  - The United Protestant Church of France authorized the blessing of same-sex unions by pastors in May 2015, two years after the government legalized same-sex marriages. Individual vicars may refuse to perform same-sex marriage ceremonies.
  - The Evangelical Church of the Augsburg Confession in Austria permits same-sex marriages.
  - The Church of South India has many members and clergy that support same-sex marriages.
  - The Uniting Reformed Church in Southern Africa permits same-sex marriage
  - The United Church of Christ in the Philippines supports LGBTQ rights and inclusion.
- Rainbow Catholics India now has representation at Mumbai, Goa, and Bangalore
- The Philippine Independent Church is LGBT-supportive and "acknowledges past homophobic wrongs" through their statement "Our Common Humanity, Our Shared Dignity".
- The Waldensian Evangelical Church permits same-sex marriage.
- Mennonites in the Netherlands offer marriage to both heterosexual and same-gender couples.
- The Mennonite Church Canada offers marriage to both heterosexual and same-gender couples.
- Each congregation within the Christian Church (Disciples of Christ) is permitted to determine if would like to perform same-sex marriages.
- Parts of the Moravian Church permit same-sex marriage.
- The Unity Church is fully LGBT-affirming.

A number of Christian ministries seek to create officially sanctioned "safe-spaces" in a similar vein as gay–straight alliances in various schools.

==== Unitarian Universalism ====
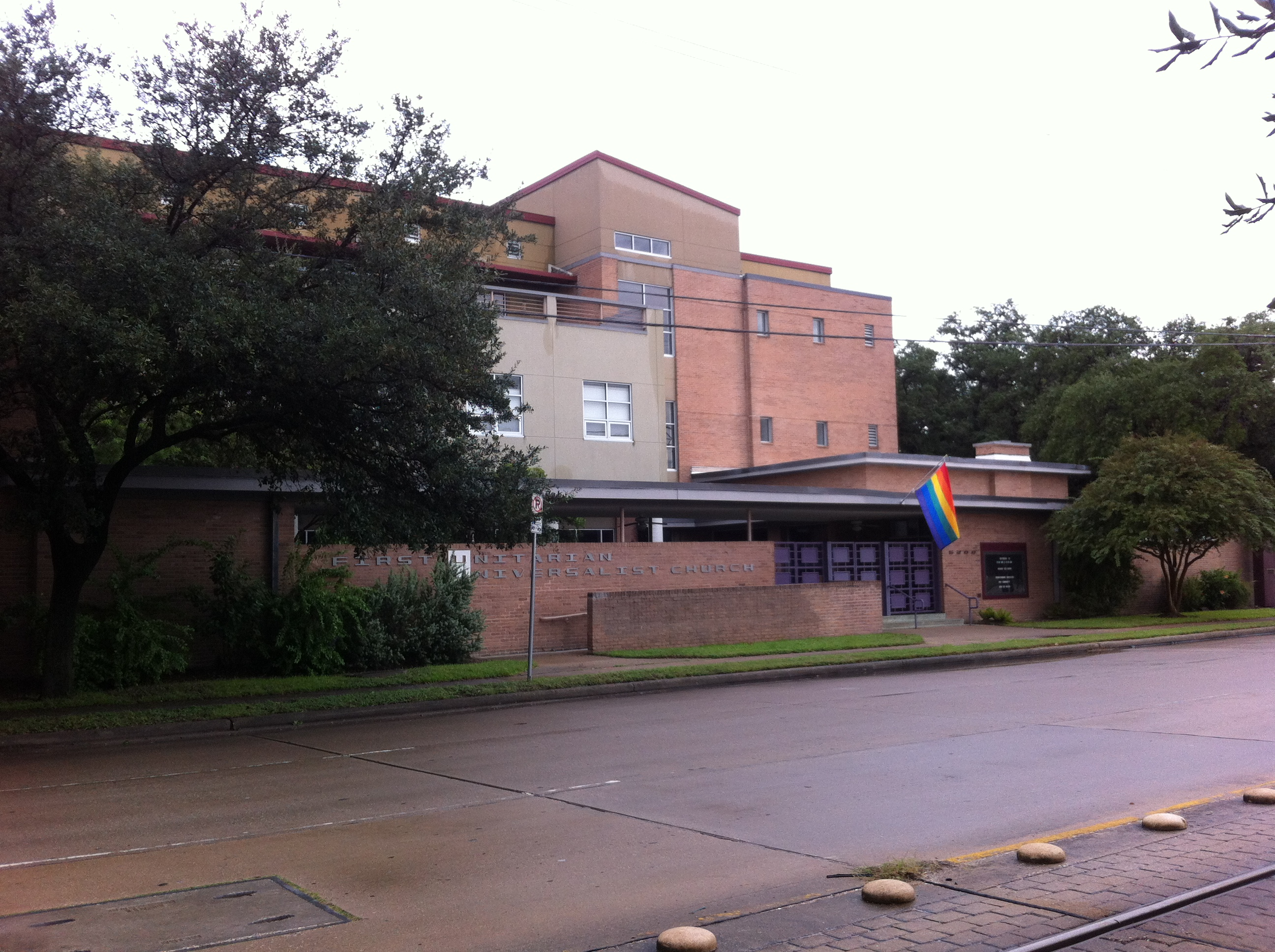
The LGBTQ flag at the First Unitarian Universalist Church in Houston indicates that the church welcomes LGBTQ-identifying people.

Unitarian Universalism has a long-standing tradition of welcoming LGBTQ people. The official position of the Unitarian Universalist Association (UUA) states that "Each of us has worth and dignity, and that worth includes our gender and our sexuality. As Unitarian Universalists (UUs), we not only open our doors to people of all sexual orientations and gender identities, we value diversity of sexuality and gender and see it as a spiritual gift. We create inclusive religious communities and work for LGBTQ justice and equity as a core part of who we are. All of who you are is sacred. All of who you are is welcome."

The first ceremony of union performed by a UU minister for a same-gender couple was reportedly done in the late 1950s. It became more commonplace in the late 1970s and early 1980s. The UUA has been ordaining people regardless of sexual orientation since the 1970s, and the first openly transgender person was ordained in 1988. The UUA expects all ministers to show ministerial competency in the area of human sexuality before being approved for ordination. In 2004 the UUA President's Freedom to Marry Fund was launched. In 2009 Standing on the Side of Love was launched, a public advocacy campaign that seeks to harness love's power to stop oppression. The campaign provides a platform for freedom to marry efforts, among other causes.

=== Judaism ===
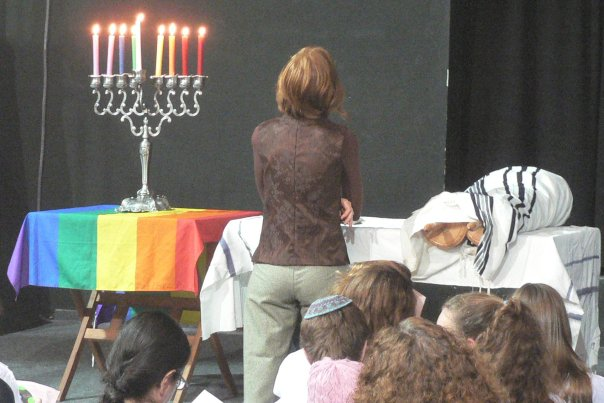
A halakhic egalitarian Pride minyan in Tel Aviv on the second Shabbat of Hanukkah

The Jewish LGBT+ World Congress organization was founded in 1976 by various national associations. By 2025, it had 19 member associations in 10 countries.

The American branch of Conservative Judaism formally approves of same-sex marriage ceremonies. As of 1992 with the Report of the Reconstructionist Commission on Homosexuality, the Reconstructionist Movement of Judaism has expressed its support for same-sex marriages as well as the inclusion of gay and lesbian people in all aspects of Jewish life. The Jewish Reconstructionist Federation leaves the choice of whether or not to perform same-sex marriages to individual rabbis but the procedure is included in the Reconstructionist Rabbi's Manual and many choose to use the traditional language and symbols of kiddushin. Reform Judaism, the largest Jewish denomination in the United States, is generally supportive of LGBTQ rights and marriage. In Canada, Congregation Shir Libeynu was founded in 1997 in Toronto as an LGBTQ+-inclusive congregation.

Views on LGBTQ inclusion in Judaism are varying across its major branches: Reform, Conservative, and Orthodox Judaism. The differences in views on LGBTQ are based on different interpretation of religious text and the role of the community. Reform Judaism is the most supportive of LGBTQ inclusion. It historically supported their rights, especially same-sex marriage, and each individual in religious leadership and community life. Conservative Judaism shows increasing support for LGBTQ inclusion. For example, the American religious life approved same-sex marriage ceremonies, though interpretations still vary across congregations. However, Orthodox Judaism tends to maintain a more traditional interpretation of Jewish law, limiting acceptance of same-sex relationships. Even though the limiting acceptance, some individuals show support and advocates for greater inclusion, which has been an ongoing debate.

==== Orthodox Judaism ====
Orthodox Judaism maintains traditional interpretations of Jewish law. It disallows homosexual relationships and less affirms LGBTQ identities compared to other branches such as Reform and Conservative Judaism. Within Orthodox Judaism, there is also internal diversity. The Ultra-Orthodox (Haredi) communities tend to maintain stricter adherence to religious law, often rejecting LGBTQ identities. In contrast, Modern Orthodox Jews have started to acknowledge LGBTQ identities and encourage to the greater inclusion, while keeping the traditional prohibitions. Despite these differences, prohibitions on same-sex relationship remain as fundamental in Orthodox Judaism. Many LGBTQ Jews struggle to harmonize with their religious and sexual identities, particularly within Orthodox communities. A minority of LGBTQ individuals, leaving Orthodox communities, were disaffiliated with this group because of their sexual identity.

These prohibitions are rooted in biblical and rabbinical teachings, particularly laws found in the Torah, where certain same-sex acts are described as an "abhorrent" act and are associated with severe sexual religious penalties in traditional interpretations. Orthodox teaching also emphasizes family structure, reproduction, and specific gender roles, contributing to the rejection of same-sex relationships that do not align with these expectations: "institutes a functional gender duality anchored in the need for reproduction of the Jewish collective body". This creates a tension between religious teaching and modern ideas of individual identity that some individuals to feel excluded and pressured to reconcile their identities. Israel's context suggests that an individual's freedom is included as a most basic value that also shapes laws related to the marriage.

=== Islam ===
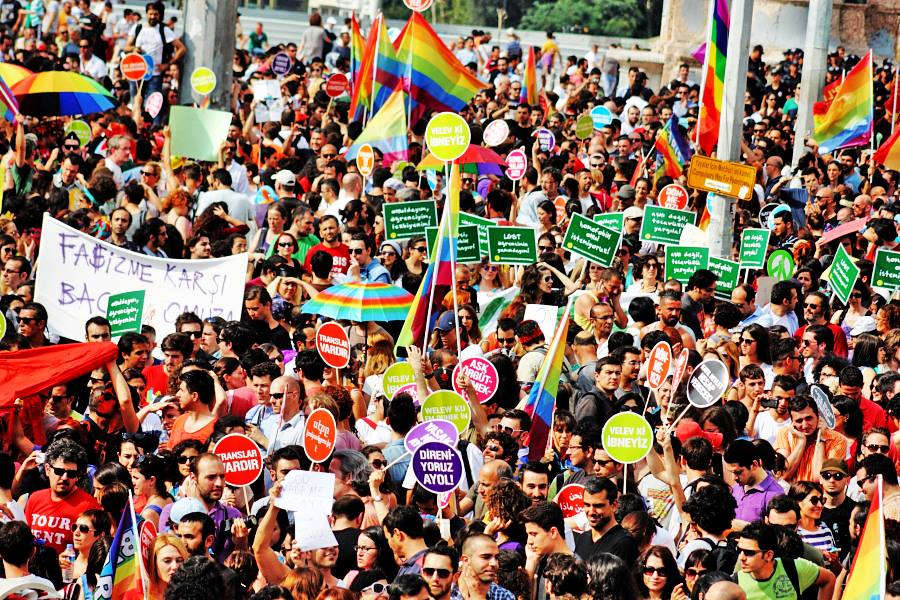
Istanbul LGBTQ Pride parade in 2013, Taksim Square, Istanbul, Turkey

Attitudes toward LGBTQ+ people and their experiences in the Muslim world have been influenced by its religious, legal, social, political, and cultural history. The religious stigma and sexual taboo associated with homosexuality in Islamic societies can have profound effects for those Muslims who self-identify as LGBTQ. Today, most LGBTQ-affirming Islamic organizations and individual congregations are primarily based in the Western world and South Asian countries; they usually identify themselves with the liberal and progressive movements within Islam.

Homosexual acts are forbidden in traditional Islamic jurisprudence and are liable to different punishments, including flogging, stoning, and the death penalty, depending on the situation and legal school. However, homosexual relationships were generally tolerated in pre-modern Islamic societies, and historical records suggest that these laws were invoked infrequently, mainly in cases of rape or other "exceptionally blatant infringement on public morals". Public attitudes toward homosexuality in the Muslim world underwent a marked negative change starting from the 19th century through the global spread of Islamic fundamentalist movements such as Salafism and Wahhabism, and the influence of the sexual notions and restrictive norms prevalent in Europe at the time: a number of Muslim-majority countries have retained criminal penalties for homosexual acts enacted under European colonial rule. In recent times, extreme prejudice, discrimination, and violence against LGBTQ people persists, both socially and legally, in much of the Muslim world, exacerbated by increasingly socially conservative attitudes and the rise of Islamist movements in Muslim-majority countries. There are laws against homosexual sexual activities in a large number of Muslim-majority countries, which prescribe the death penalty in a limited number of them.

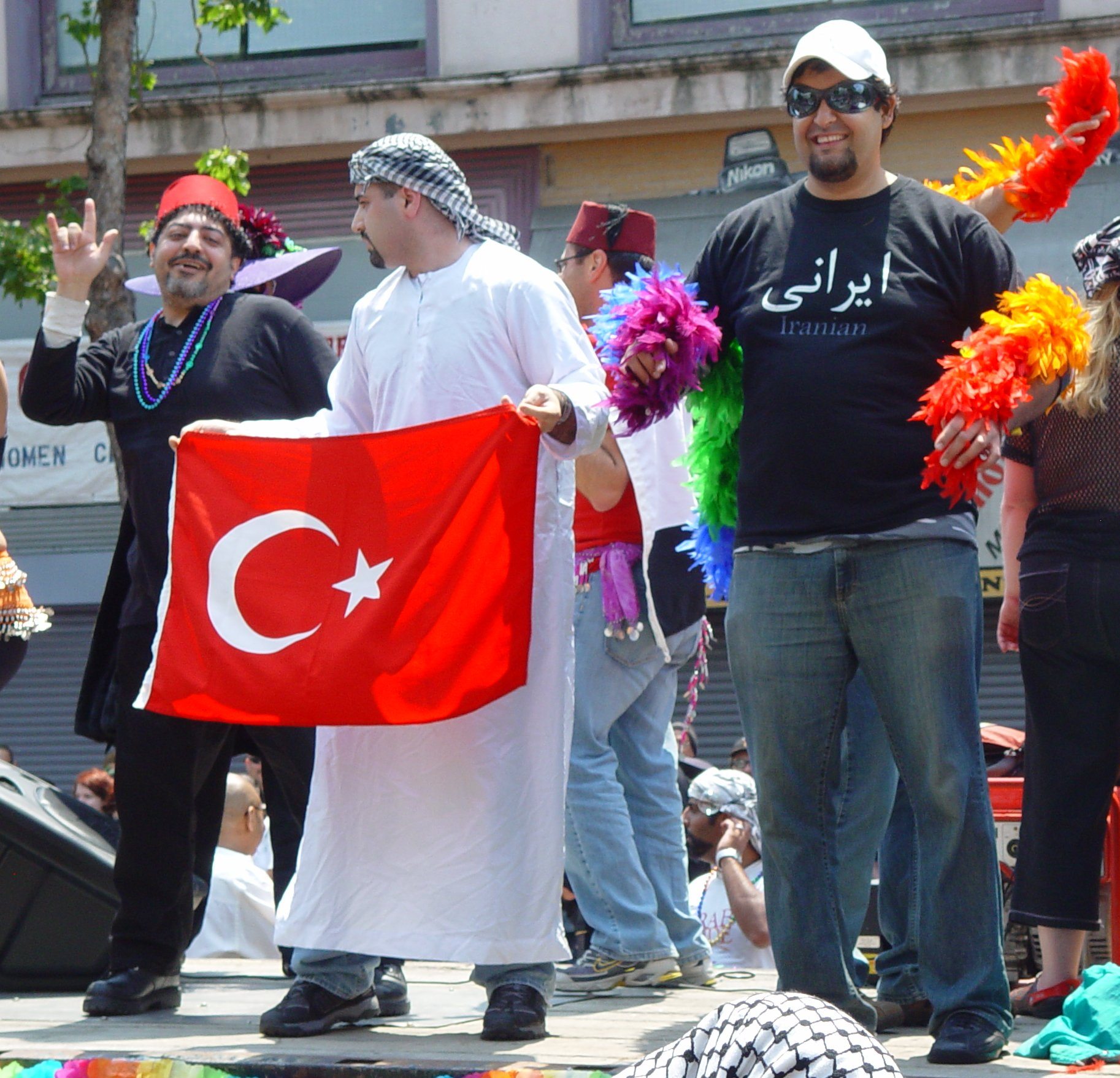
Gay Muslim activists of the Al-Fatiha Foundation holding the flag of Turkey at the San Francisco Pride (2008)

In France there was an Islamic same-sex marriage on 18 February 2012. In Paris, in November 2012, a room in a Buddhist prayer hall was used by gay Muslims and called a "gay-friendly mosque", and a French Islamic website is supporting religious same-sex marriage. The Ibn Ruschd-Goethe mosque in Berlin is a liberal mosque open to all types of Muslims, where men and women pray together and LGBTQ worshippers are welcomed and supported. Other significant LGBT-inclusive mosques or prayer groups include the El-Tawhid Juma Circle Unity Mosque in Toronto, Masjid an-Nur al-Isslaah (Light of Reform Mosque) in Washington D.C., Masjid Al-Rabia in Chicago, Unity Mosque in Atlanta, People's Mosque in Cape Town South Africa, Masjid Ul-Umam mosque in Cape Town, Qal'bu Maryamin in California, and the Nur Ashki Jerrahi Sufi Community in New York City.

Muslims for Progressive Values, based in the United States and Malaysia, is "a faith-based, grassroots, human rights organization that embodies and advocates for the traditional Qur'anic values of social justice and equality for all, for the 21st Century." MPV has recorded "a lecture series that seeks to dismantle the religious justification for homophobia in Muslim communities." The lectures can be viewed at MPV Lecture Series. The Mecca Institute is an LGBT-inclusive and progressive online Islamic seminary, and serves as an online center of Islamic learning and research.

== Dharmic religions ==
=== Buddhism ===
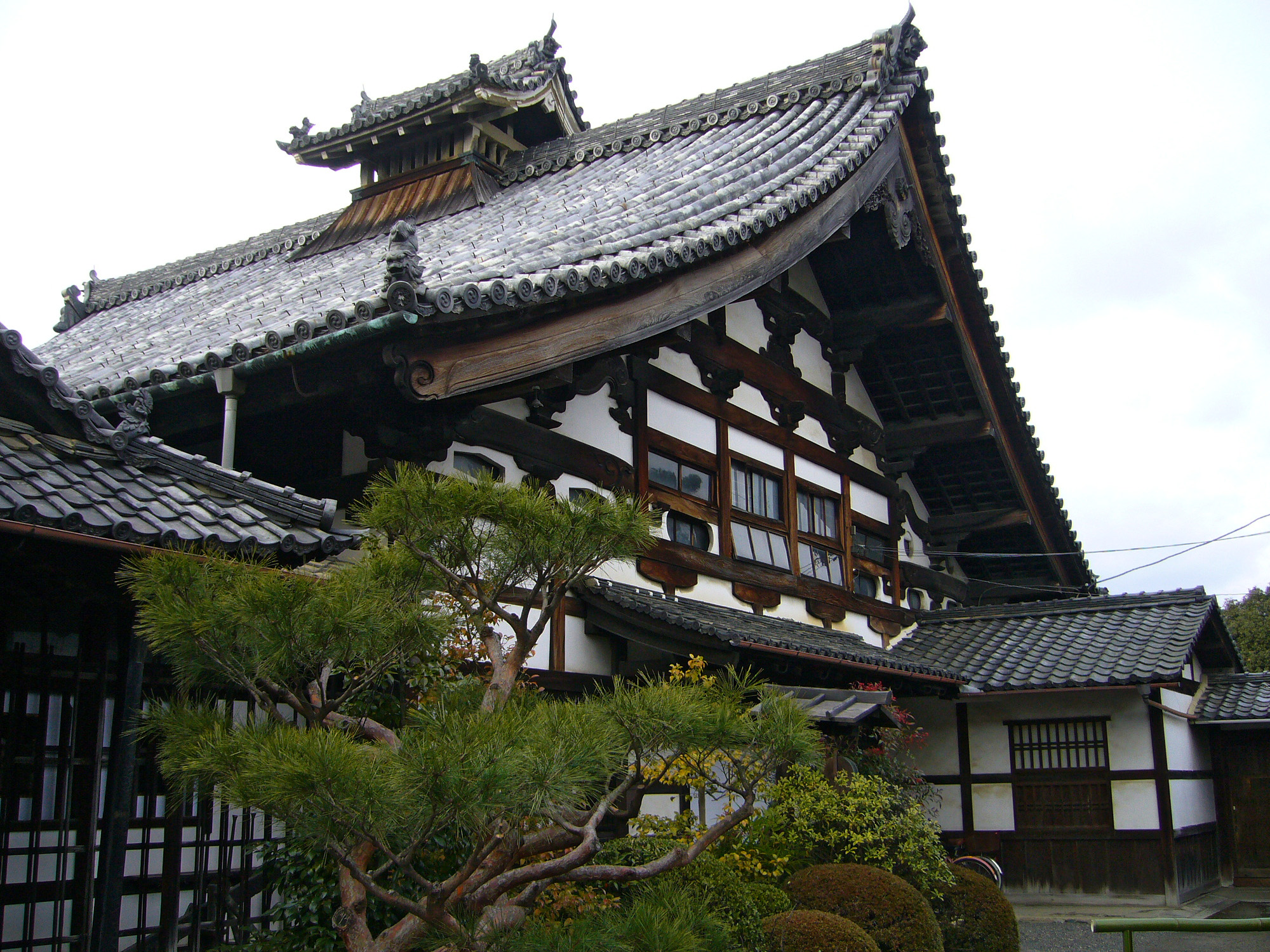
Shunkō-in (Japanese: 春光院: "Temple of the Ray of Spring Light") in Kyoto, Japan, that performs same-sex marriage ceremonies

Among Buddhists there is a wide diversity of opinion about homosexuality. According to the Pāli Canon and Āgama (the Early Buddhist scriptures), there is not any saying that same-sex or opposite sex relations have anything to do with sexual misconduct. Scholars argue that early Buddhism did not see sexual orientation as a moral issue and that tolerance aligns with core values of Buddhism as a whole. As such, Buddhist attitudes towards homosexuality are often a reflection of local culture rather than Buddhist teachings. The history of homosexuality in Buddhist societies includes cultures of acceptance and non-acceptance in different locations and times.

Several Buddhist influenced societies have historically documented same-sex relationships and forms of gender variance. East Asian historical sources contain references to male same-sex relationships, including China's LGBT history and documented male-male relationships in Japan, the tales of the great mirror of male love, and queerness within some Buddhist monastic communities Early European travelers and missionaries to East Asia and Tibet also commented, with condemnation, on the common visibility of these relationships. Some of the Jātaka tales, such as the Sāma Jātaka, include characters who change gender, reflecting gender fluidity Buddhist literature.

Gender diverse social roles have existed in several Buddhist cultural contexts, including the Kathoey of southeast Asia. Gender diverse ritual and spiritual roles have also appeared in syncretic traditions such as the Vietnamese Đạo Mẫu and the Burmese Nat Kadaw. Buddhist texts including the Lotus Sutra and the Vimalakirti Sutra contain episodes in which sex or gender is transformed or used to challenge fixed understandings of gender. In East Asian Buddhism, the bodhisattva Guanyin came to be represented in male, female, and androgynous forms and is traditionally understood as capable of manifesting in different forms and genders in order to compassionately assist all sentient beings.

Traditionally, Buddhist monks are not involved in marriages. viewing marriage as a secular. In contemporary times, Taiwan and Thailand (with the support of King Maha Vajiralongkorn) have both legalized same-sex marriage. Public support for same-sex marriage has grown in several Buddhist influenced societies, including Japan, Vietnam and Cambodia.

In the contemporary period, many Buddhist leaders have supported LGBTQ inclusion in various ways. The Plum Village Tradition, founded in Vietnam by Thích Nhất Hạnh and Chân Không and now headquartered in France has strongly supported LGBT inclusion. The tradition is notable for emphasizing engaged Buddhism, including activism for LGBTQ rights. In South Korea, Venerable Jinwoo, president of the Jogye Order, the largest Buddhist group in the country, expressed support for anti-discrimination protections for LGBT people. In Taiwan, the Buddhist nun Shih Chao-hwei was a prominent advocate for same-sex marriage. Hsing Yun, founder of Fo Guang Shan, expressed the view that homosexuality warranted tolerance rather than condemnation stating homosexuality "...is neither right nor wrong. It is just something that people do". In Japan, several Buddhist temples and clergy have participated in LGBT advocacy and same-sex blessing ceremonies. Same-sex marriages are performed at Shunkō-in, a Rinzai Zen Buddhist temple in Kyoto, Japan. Shozenji Temple in Moriguchi City, Osaka is LGBT affirming and includes a shrine to Guanyin.

In Thailand, the monk Phra Maha Shine Waradhammo publicly supported same-sex marriage efforts. In Cambodia, King Norodom Sihanouk endorsed same-sex marriage in a 2004 French language letter. Current King Norodom Sihamoni also supports the legalisation of same-sex marriage. Religious services are available for Cambodians in some Buddhist pagodas during pride celebrations. In Loas, activist Anan Bouapha has stated that the culture and mentality seem to be quite open-minded to people from all walks of life and they have seen many transgender people wearing traditional costumes to temples and attending traditional ceremonies.

Within Tibetan Buddhism, the 17th Gyalwang Karmapa has expressed understanding toward LGBT people, while Dzongsar Jamyang Khyentse Rinpoche has expressed support for LGBT rights in Buhtan. The Tibetan Nalandabodhi and Shambhala sanghas have both stated that they welcome practitioners of all LGBT people. The 14th Dalai Lama, who leads the Gelug sect of Tibetan Buddhism, has given conflicting statement on LGBTQ rights, but stated in 2014 that same-sex marriage is permissible provided it does not conflict with the values of one's chosen religion.

Some adherents of the Navayāna (Ambedkarite) Buddhist tradition are supporting LGBTQ rights within their larger religious and social efforts.

In Western Buddhist communities, support for LGBT rights has been expressed by many prominent Buddhists including zenju earthlyn manuel and queer scholar bell hooks, whose work on love, community, and liberation integrated Buddhist thought (particularly the writings of Thích Nhất Hạnh) into her framework. Queer resources have also appeared in publications such as Tricycle and Lions Roar magazines. Organizations including the European Buddhist Union, the Buddhist Churches of America, the Federation of Australian Buddhist Councils, and the Australian Sangha Association have expressed support. The Buddhist Church of San Francisco performed same-sex marriage ceremonies beginning in the 1970s, while American Soka Gakkai Buddhists have performed same-sex union ceremonies since the 1990s.

=== Hinduism ===
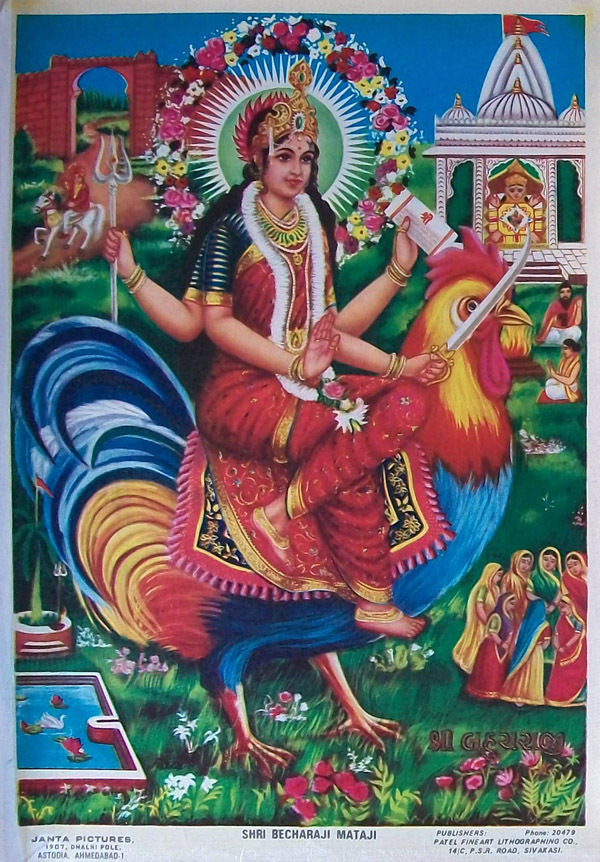
Bahuchar Mata is sometimes considered a patron goddess of the Hijras.

Hinduism is an umbrella term for a range of Indian religious and spiritual traditions (sampradayas). Hinduism has no central doctrinal authority and many Hindus do not claim to belong to any denomination nor are there universally agreed upon texts, traditions, leaders, or authorities.

Many queer-affirming Hindus look to LGBTQ themes in Hindu mythology and LGBTQ content in pre-modern India as reasons to support and celebrate LGBTQ people. Some Medieval Hindu temples such as those at Khajuraho depict sexual acts in sculptures on the external walls some of which involve same-sex sexuality.

A third-gender known as hijra, has a long history in South Asia, with commentary on their existence in Hindu society in texts like the Ramayana and the Mahabharata. In the 21st century, many hijras live in well-defined and organised all-hijra communities, led by a guru.

Hinduism, and LGBTQ rights in India, have has also been influenced by British colonization, which including making homosexuality illegal in India 1860 due to colonial British laws which was overturned by the Indian Supreme Court in 2018 in the case of Navtej Singh Johar v. Union of India.

Mohan Bhagwat, head of the large and influencial Rashtriya Swayamsevak Sangh (RSS) has stated that LGBT people "should have their own private and social space as they are humans and have the right to live as others" and cited Hindu scriptures and mythology as the basis of his support. Bhagwat also stated "Without much hullabaloo, we have found a way with a humane approach to provide them social acceptance."

The Hindu American Foundation (HAF) states that one of Hinduism's core teachings is that every being is Divine or a reflection of Divine qualities, regardless of one's outer attributes. HAF states that this and other fundamental and ancient Hindu teachings may allow Hindus to more openly embrace LGBTQ rights and marriage equality. HAF supports marriage equality for all Americans and submitted amicus briefs in various U.S. courts, including the U.S. Supreme Court, to this end.

Anil Bhanot, general secretary of The United Kingdom Hindu Council said: "The point here is that the homosexual nature is part of the natural law of God; it should be accepted for what it is, no more and no less. Hindus are generally conservative but it seems to me that in ancient India, they even celebrated sex as an enjoyable part of procreation, where priests were invited for ceremonies in their home to mark the beginning of the process."

The Gay & Lesbian Vaishnava Association is a nonprofit religious organization offering positive information and support to LGBTQI Vaishnavas and Hindus more generally

=== Sikhism ===
As individuals, many Sikhs support LGBTQ rights, civil partnerships, and same sex marriage because of the religion's emphasis on justice and equality. Civil partnerships and same sex marriage are not banned in the Guru Granth Sahib. LGBT-affirming Sikhs point to the Sikh belief that marriage is a union of souls. In Sikhism, the soul is seen as genderless, and the outward appearance of human beings (man, woman) is a temporary state.

Sikhism does not have a singular stance on LGBTQ rights. In 2005, the Jathedar of the Akal Takht, the highest temporal authority in Sikhism based in India, condemned homosexuality and urged Sikhs in Canada to vote against gay marriage. Navdeep Singh Bains defied this advice and supported gay marriage rights. Past edicts from the Jathedar have not always been acknowledged or accepted by Sikh communities, both within India and abroad. The Sikh Council of the United Kingdom supports gay commitment ceremonies and legal rights but not marriage rights. Many Sikhs, particular in Canada, have vocally support LGBTQ rights including Jagmeet Singh who is the first Sikh to be elected to leadership of a Canadian federal political party. LGBTQ groups were invited to march in the Sikh Baisakhi Parade in Vancouver and invited to the spring Vaisakhi festival. The World Sikh Organization (WSO) based in Canada supports the rights of LGBTQ people.

Sarbat is an organization consisting of a group of volunteer Sikhs who are both practising and non-practising with a mission of furthering the Sikh LGBT+ cause. The members host meetings and provide support for LGBT Sikhs. They do not consider themselves to be a religious group. Most of their volunteers are based around London. Sarbat's core ethics include the idea of Seva (selfless service); equality and respect; acknowledgement of five fundamental qualities that Gurus advocated (1. Sat (truth), 2. Daya (compassion), 3. Santokh (contentment), 4. Nimrata (humility), and 5. Pyaar (love)); and confidentiality/discretion.

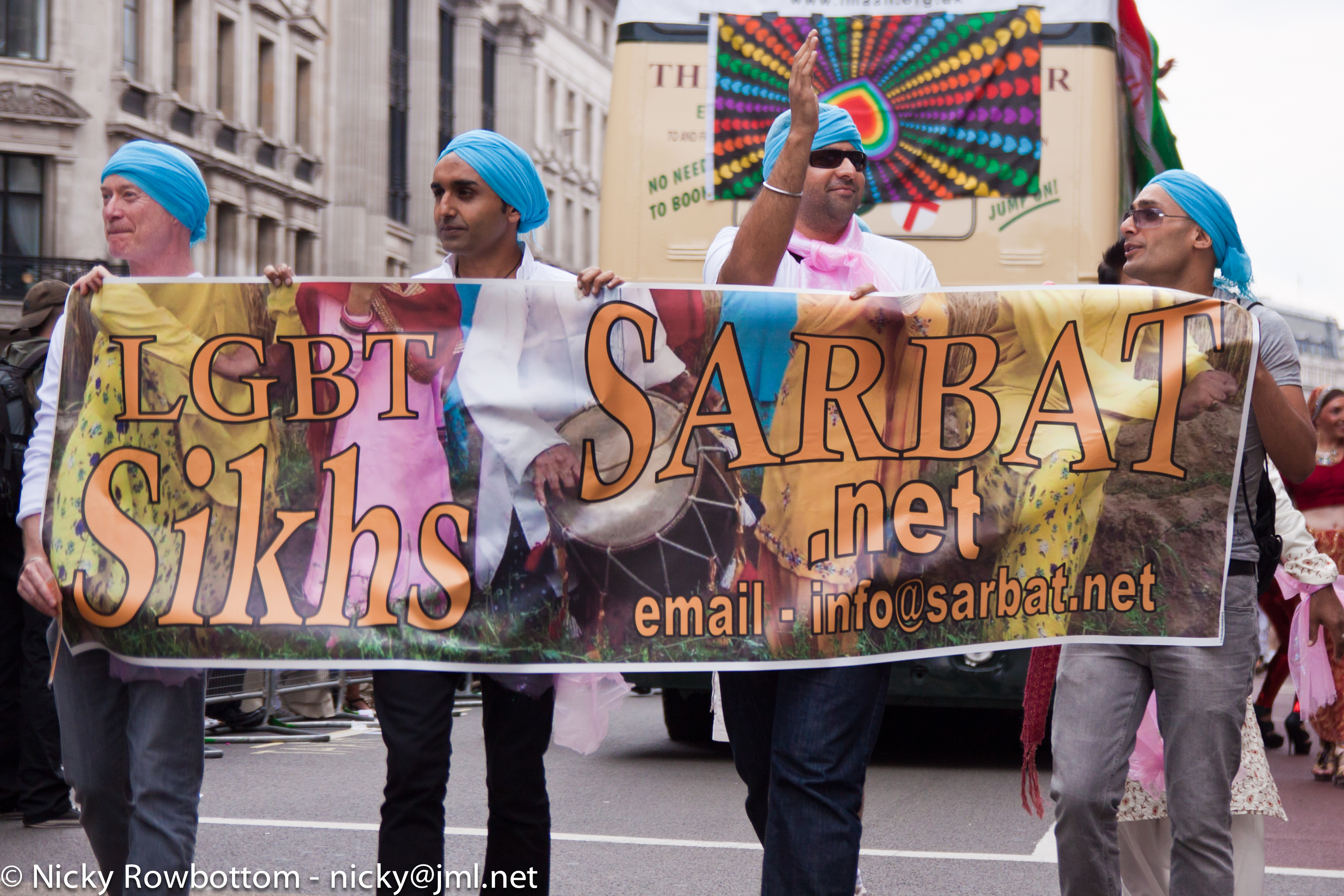
LGBTQ Sikhs at London gay pride event

== Eastern and Southeast Asian religions ==
=== Chinese folk religion ===
Tu'er Shen, also known as the Rabbit God, is a gay Chinese deity. In 2006, Lu Wei-ming founded a temple for Tu'er Shen and Taoist worship in Yonghe District in the New Taipei City in Taiwan. About 9,000 pilgrims visit the temple each year praying for a suitable (same-sex) partner. The Wei-ming temple also performs love ceremonies for gay couples. It is the world's only religious shrine for homosexuals.

=== Confucianism ===
Homosexuality is not explicitly addressed in the Analects of Confucius. Modern Confucian perspectives on same-sex relationships vary that some scholars argue about Confucian values: care, relationships, and personal cultivation. However, others still adhere to the traditional Confucian family ideals and strict gender roles. This challenges Confucianism to accept same-sex marriage because some still focus on the reproduction of humanity and hierarchical social structures.

Central concept in Confucian s filial conduct (xiào), which emphasizes family responsibility, obedience, and the continuation of the family line and caring for aging parents. Due to this expectation of family role, they are expected to marry and have children, supporting heterosexual relationships. LGBTQ+ individuals are strongly pressured by the Confucian community in supporting LGBTQ+ identities and hard to follow traditional family roles. Confucianism prioritizing social harmony and hierarchy suggests that maintaining stability is important, forming an unsupportive community within Confucian.

=== Shinto ===
Historically, Shinto "had no special code of morals and seems to have regarded sex as a natural phenomenon to be enjoyed with few inhibitions." While Shinto beliefs are diverse, Japanese Shinto does not condemn homosexuality, and the formally organized Konkokyo sect is fully affirming. Multiple Shinto leaders advocated in support of gay marriage in Hawaii.

=== Taoism ===
In a similar way to Buddhism, Taoist schools sought throughout history to define what would be sexual misconduct. The precept against Sexual Misconduct is sex outside your marriage. The married spouses (夫婦) usually in Chinese suggest male with female, though the scripture itself does not explicitly say anything against same-gender relations. Many sorts of precepts mentioned in the Yunji Qiqian (雲笈七籤), The Mini Daoist Canon, does not explicitly say anything against same-gender relations as well. Homosexuality is not unknown in Taoist history, such as during the Tang dynasty when Taoist nuns exchanged love poems.

=== Cao Dai ===
Cao Dai views on LGBTQ people are mixed. Cao Dai views all human beings as children of the Supreme Being, regardless of sexual orientation. While the faith emphasizes the balance of Yin and Yang as a fundamental principle of life, it acknowledges that individual life paths are spiritually preordained by divine will. Homosexuality is not explicitly mentioned in Cao Dai doctrine or divine messages, and it is regarded more as a social issue rather than a religious one. The overarching perspective is one of acceptance without judgment, aligning with the principle of "live and let live," while recognizing that homosexuality does not align with the traditional Yin-Yang balance.

== Indigenous religions ==
=== African Continental religions ===
Traditionally, the Meru culture included people called "Mugwe", who served spiritual roles and who were often homosexual and could marry other men. Several pre-colonial religious and cultural groups across the continent permitted non-heterosexual relationships or gender identities outside of the modern western gender binary.

=== African Diasporic religions ===
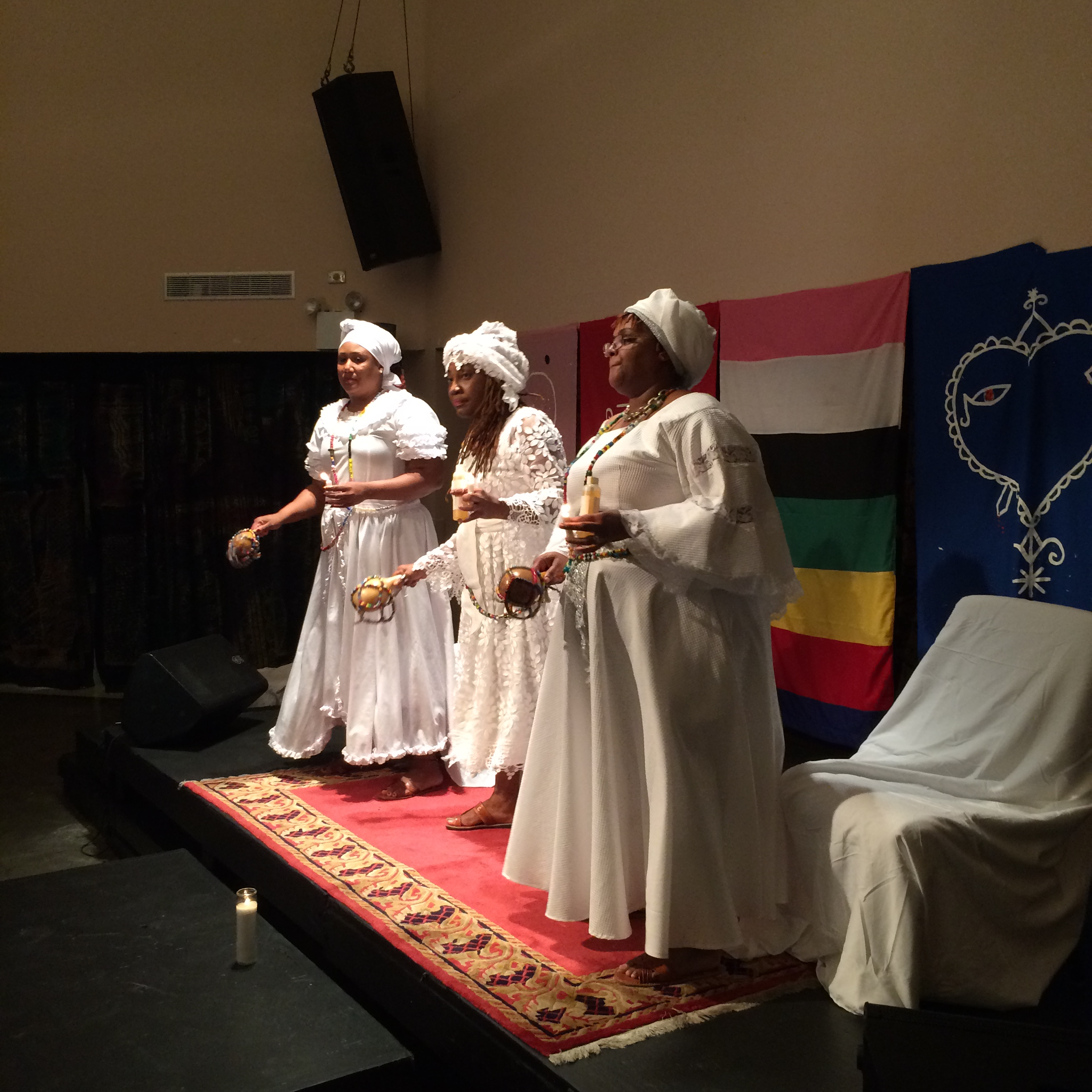
Vodou event held at the National Black Theatre in Harlem, New York City

==== Candomblé ====
Within Candomblé, a syncretic religion founds primarily found in Brazil, there is widespread (though not universal) support for gay rights, many members are LGBT, and have performed gay marriages.

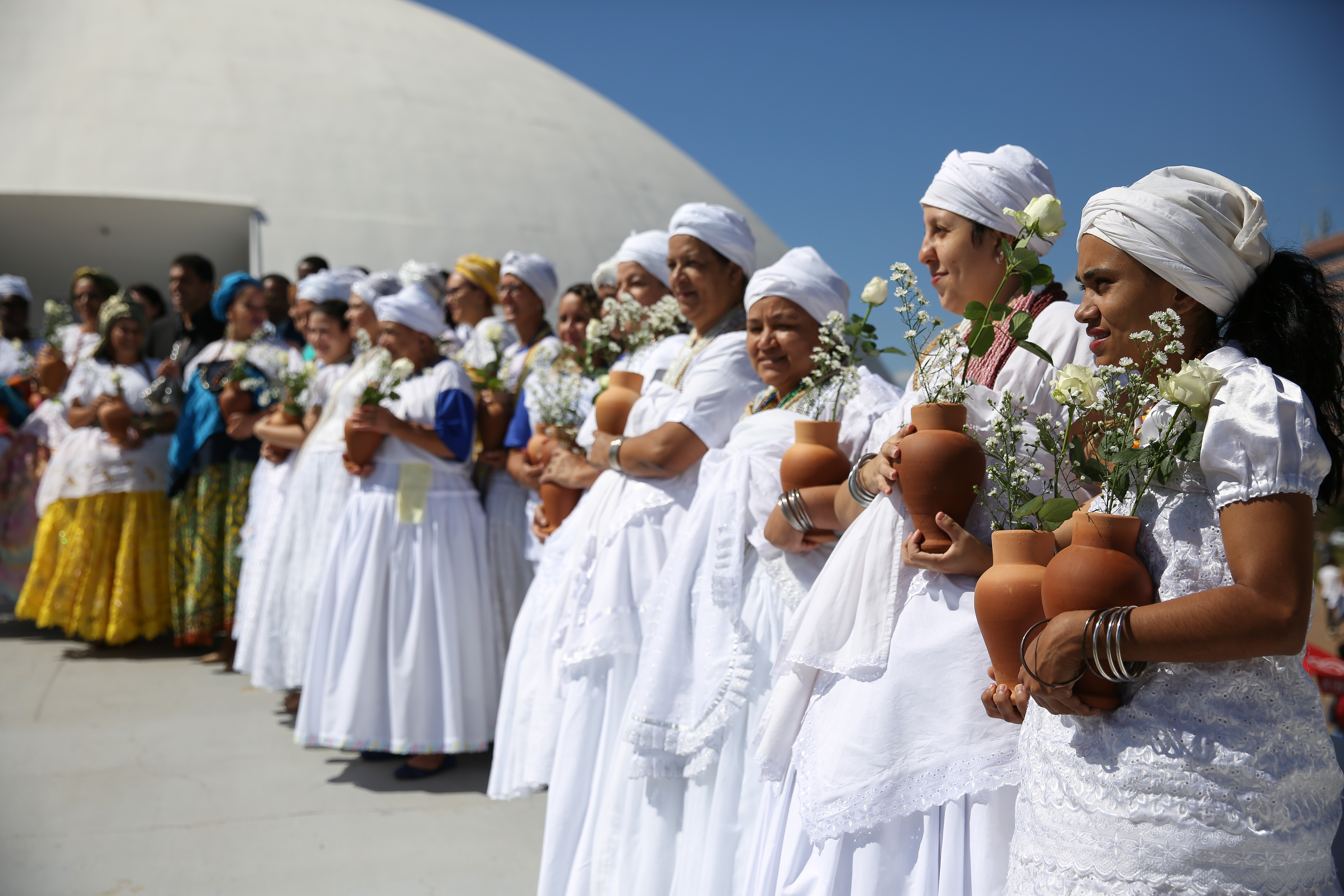
A gathering of both Candomblé and Umbanda followers in Brazil

==== Haitian Vodou ====
Homosexuality is religiously acceptable in Haitian Vodou. The lwa or loa (spirits) Erzulie Dantor and Erzulie Freda are often associated with and viewed as protectors of queer people. The lwa Guede Nibo is sometimes depicted as an effeminate cross-dresser, and inspires those he inhabits to lascivious sexuality of all kinds.

==== Santería ====
Practitioners of Santería, primarily found in Cuba, generally (though not universally) welcome LGBTQ members and include them in religious or ritual activities.

==== Umbanda ====
Also a Brazilian syncretic religion, Umbanda houses generally support LGBTQ rights and have performed gay marriages.

=== Ancient Mesopotamian religion ===
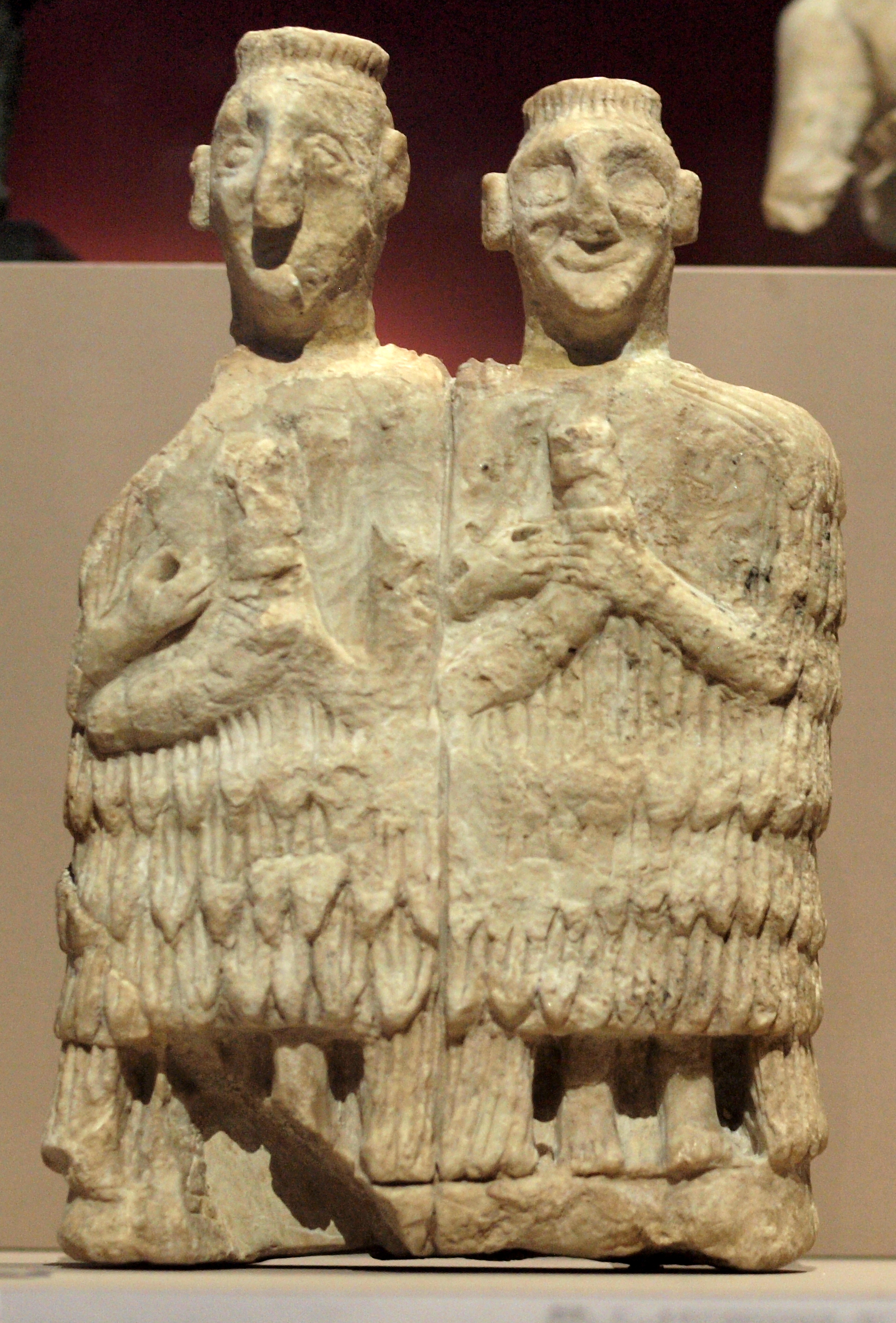
Sculpture of two Sumerian gala priests, dating to c. 2450 BC, found in the temple of Inanna at Mari

Individuals who went against the traditional gender binary were heavily involved in the cult of Inanna, an ancient Mesopotamian goddess. During Sumerian times, a set of priests known as gala worked in Inanna's temples, where they performed elegies and lamentations. Men who became gala sometimes adopted female names and their songs were composed in the Sumerian eme-sal dialect, which, in literary texts, is normally reserved for the speech of female characters. Some Sumerian proverbs seem to suggest that gala had a reputation for engaging in anal sex with men. Some modern pagans include Inanna in their worship.

During the Akkadian Period, kurgarrū and assinnu were servants of Ishtar who dressed in female clothing and performed war dances in Ishtar's temples. Several Akkadian proverbs seem to suggest that they may have also had homosexual proclivities. Gwendolyn Leick, an anthropologist known for her writings on Mesopotamia, has compared these individuals to the contemporary Indian hijra. In one Akkadian hymn, Ishtar is described as transforming men into women.

=== Burmese folk religion ===
Many Nat Kadaws in traditional Burmese folk religion are members of the LGBTQ community.

=== Đạo Mẫu ===
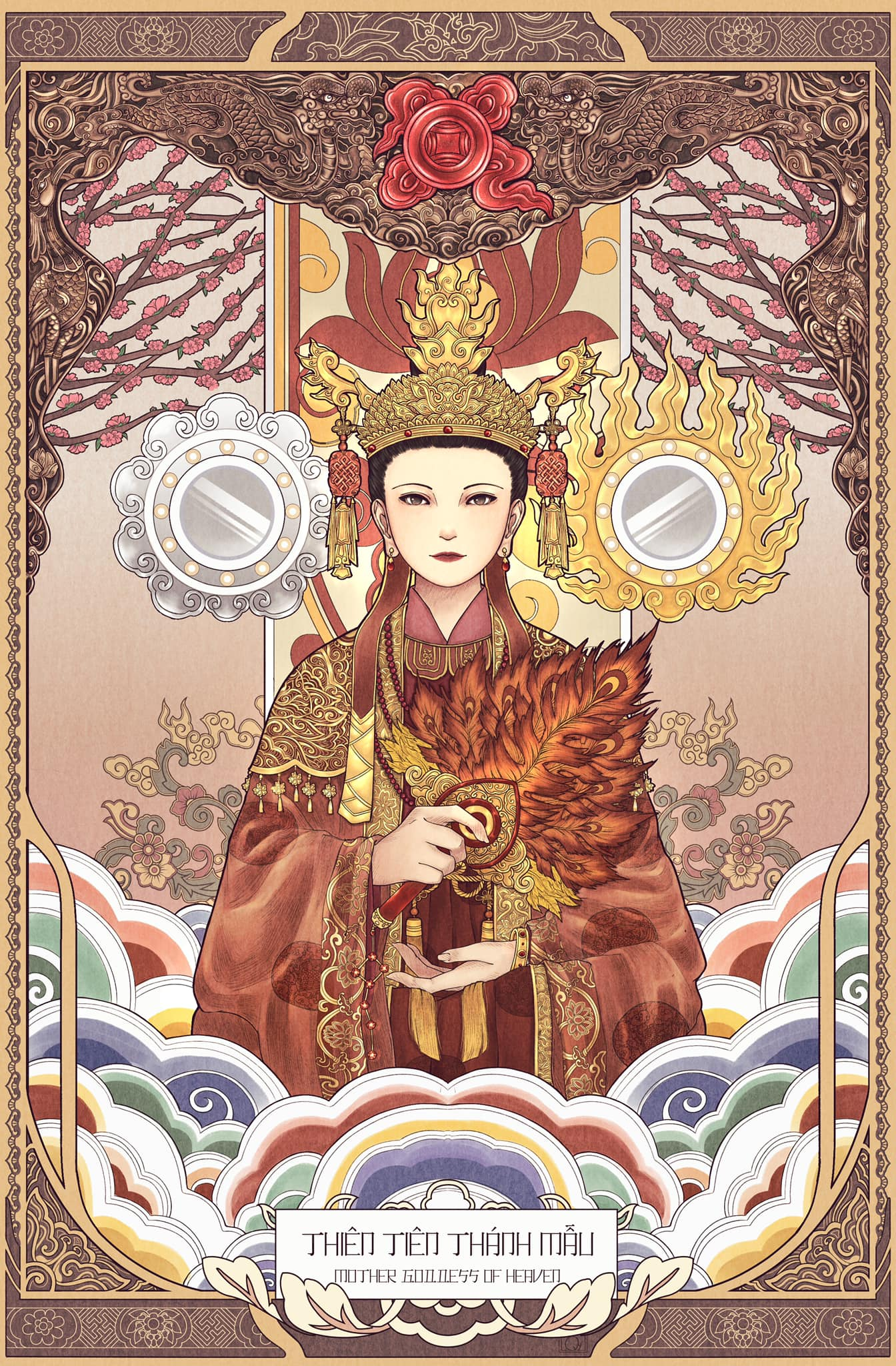
Đạo Mẫu Mother Goddess of Heaven Mẫu Thượng Thiên – Artist Lunae Lumen – Four Palaces Tứ Phủ

In Vietnam, many LGBTQ people find a safe community within the Đạo Mẫu religion which is worship on the mother god. Many LGBTQ people act as mediums during Đạo Mẫu rituals.

=== Indonesian religions ===
Among the Saʼadan (eastern Toraja) in the island of Sulawesi (Celebes), Indonesia, there are shamans who do not fit into the western gender binary. Many within the Bugis society recognize five genders: makkunrai, oroané, bissu, calabai, and calalai. Historically, the bissu gender often played religious roles though modern discrimination has reduced the number of bissu religious leaders.

=== Pre-colonial religions of the Americas ===
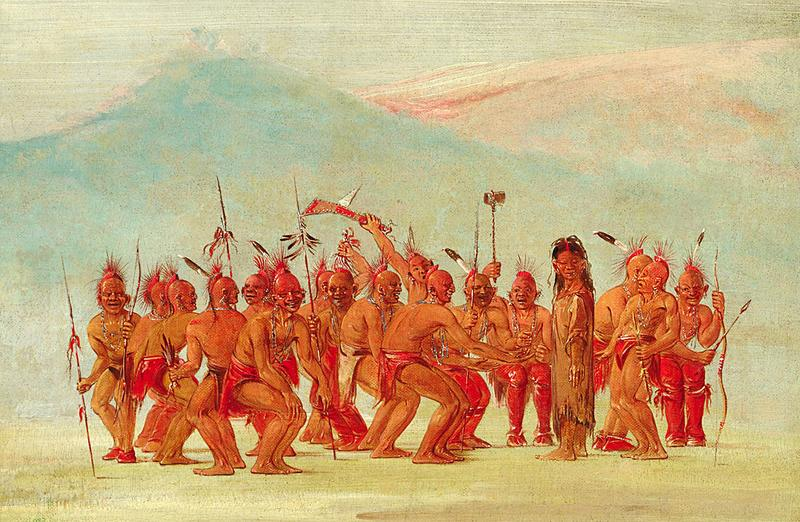
Drawing by George Catlin (1796–1872) while on the Great Plains among the Sac and Fox Nation. Depicting a group of male warriors dancing around a male-bodied person in a woman's dress, non-Native artist George Catlin titled the painting Dance to the Berdache.

Among the Indigenous peoples of the Americas prior to the European colonization, many Nations had respected ceremonial, religious, and social roles for homosexual, bisexual, and gender-nonconforming individuals in their communities and in many contemporary Native American and First Nations communities, these roles still exist. Homosexual and gender-variant individuals were also common among other pre-conquest civilizations in Latin America, such as the Aztecs, Mayans, Quechuas, Moches, Zapotecs, and the Tupinambá of Brazil and were accepted in their various religions.

The indigenous peoples of the Americas includes hundreds of cultures with varying views on sex, gender, and spirituality. Additionally, first nations and indigenous views on gender and sexuality may not fall within modern western categorizations of sex and gender.

=== Pre-colonial religions of the Philippines ===
Filipino shamans, often known as babaylan held positions of authority as religious leaders or healers in some precolonial Philippine societies. Cross-dressing or non-gender conforming males sometimes took on the role of the female babaylan. Early historical accounts record the existence of male babaylans who wore female clothes and took the demeanor of a woman. Anatomy was not the only basis for gender. Being male or female was based primarily on occupation, appearance, actions and sexuality. A male babaylan could partake in romantic and sexual relations with other men without being judged by society. A small number of Filipinos practice local indigenous religions today.

=== Traditional religions of Pacific Islands ===
In Native Hawaiian and Tahitian cultures there are third gender people called māhū with traditional spiritual and social roles within the culture. The term is similar to the Tongan fakaleiti and Samoan fa'afafine who were accepted in the traditional pre-colonial religions of their societies.

== New religious movements ==
Since the beginning of the sexual liberation movement in the Western world, which coincided with second-wave feminism and the women's liberation movement initiated in the early 1960s, new religious movements and alternative spiritualities such as Modern Paganism and the New Age began to grow and spread across the globe alongside their intersection with the sexual liberation movement and the counterculture of the 1960s, and exhibited characteristic features, such as the embrace of alternative lifestyles, unconventional dress, rejection of Abrahamic religions and their conservative social mores, use of cannabis and other recreational drugs, relaxed attitude, sarcastic humble or self-imposed poverty, and laissez-faire sexual behavior. The sexual liberation movement was aided by feminist ideologues in their mutual struggle to challenge traditional ideas regarding female sexuality, male sexuality, and queer sexuality. Elimination of undue favorable bias towards men and objectification of women, as well as support for women's right to choose their sexual partners free of outside interference or societal judgment, were three of the main goals associated with sexual liberation from the feminist perspective.

=== Antoinism ===
Antoinism, a new religious movement founded in Belgium in 1910, does not provide any prescription on issues such as sexuality, as it considers that this is not related to spirituality; homosexuality is not deemed a sin and there is nothing wrong to be gay and antoinist.

=== Eckankar ===
Eckankar, an American new religious movement founded by Paul Twitchell in 1965, says on its website that "where legally recognized, same-sex marriages are performed, in the form of the ECK Wedding Ceremony, by ordained ministers of Eckankar".

=== Modern Paganism ===
Most Neopagan religions have the theme of fertility (both physical and creative/spiritual) as central to their practices, and as such encourage what they view as a healthy sex life, consensual sex between adults, regardless of gender.

Heathenry, a modern Germanic Pagan movement, includes several pro-LGBTQ groups. Some groups legitimize openness toward LGBTQ practitioners by reference to the gender-bending actions of Thor and Odin in Norse mythology. There are, for instance, homosexual and transgender members of The Troth, a prominent U.S. Heathen organisation. Many Heathen groups in Northern Europe perform same-sex marriages, and a group of self-described "Homo-Heathens" marched in the 2008 Stockholm Pride carrying a statue of the Norse god Freyr. Research found a greater proportion of LGBTQ practitioners within Heathenry (21%) than wider society, although noted that the percentage was lower than in other forms of modern Paganism.

==== Wicca ====
Wicca, like other religions, has adherents with a broad spectrum of views, ranging from conservative to liberal. It is a largely nondogmatic religion and has no prohibitions against sexual intercourse outside of marriage or relationships between members of the same sex. The religion's ethics are largely summed up by the Wiccan Rede: "An it harm none, do as thou wilt", which is interpreted by many as allowing and endorsing responsible sexual relationships of all varieties. Specifically in the Wiccan tradition of modern witchcraft, one of the widely accepted pieces of Craft liturgy, the Charge of the Goddess instructs that "...all acts of love and pleasure are [the Goddess'] rituals", giving validity to all forms of sexual activity for Wiccan practitioners.

In the Gardnerian and Alexandrian forms of Wicca, the "Great Rite" is a sex ritual much like the hieros gamos, performed by a priest and priestess who are believed to embody the Wiccan God and Goddess. The Great Rite is almost always performed figuratively using the athame and chalice as symbols of the penis and vagina. The literal form of the ritual is always performed by consenting adults, by a couple who are already lovers and in private. The Great Rite is not seen as an opportunity for casual sex.

Many Wiccans are generally welcoming of LGBTQ people. Wiccans tend to view sex in a positive light without guilt. Some strands of Wicca go beyond welcoming queer people and actively celebrate gay relationships.

=== Neo-Druidism ===
The Order of Bards, Ovates and Druids is a worldwide group dedicated to practicing, teaching, and developing modern Druidry and has more than 25,000 members in 50 countries. The Order is LGBT-affirming within a larger framework of support for civil rights, love of justice, and the love of all existences.

=== Raëlism ===
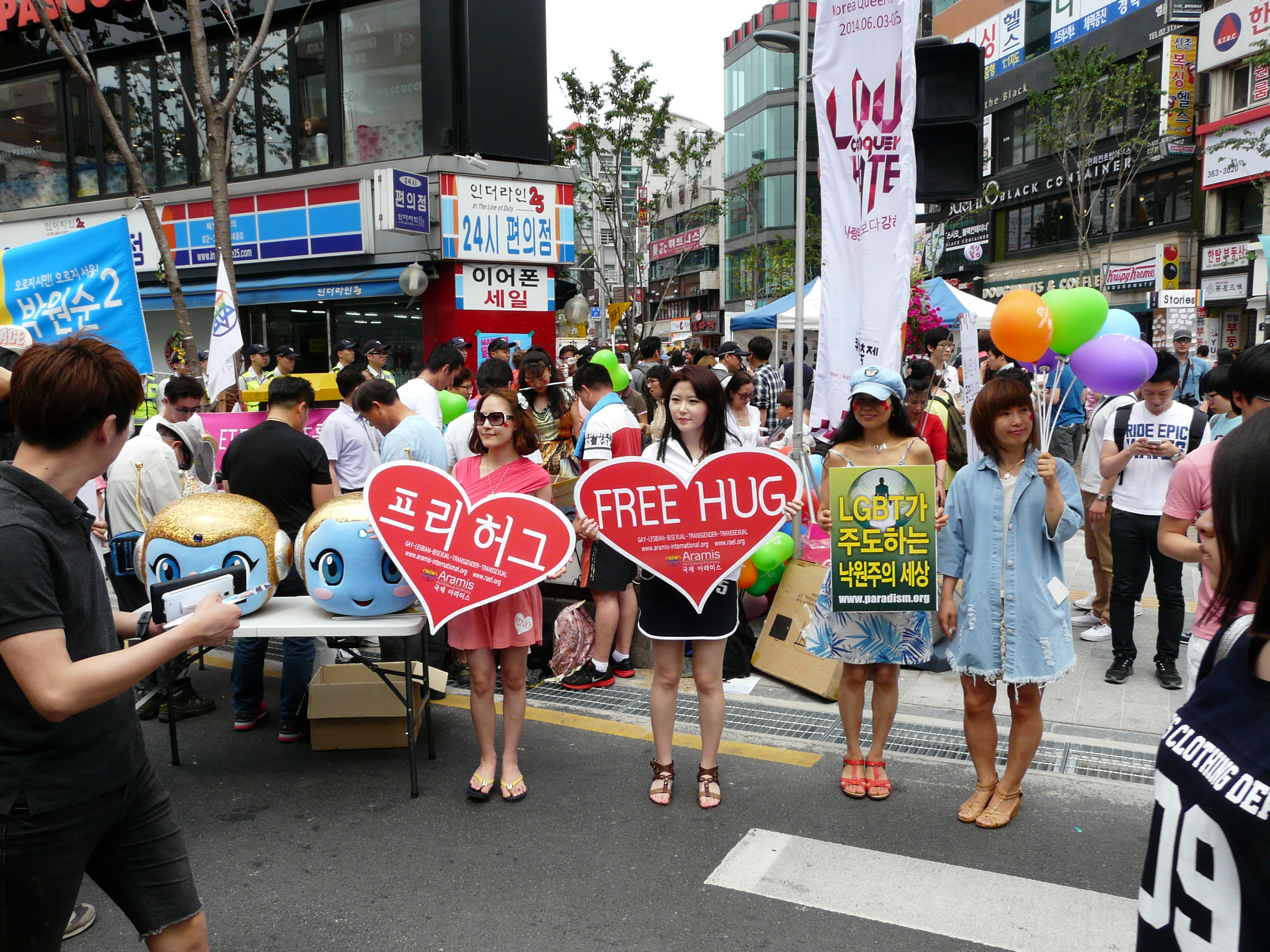
Raëlian participants attending the Korea Queer Culture Festival (2014)

Raëlism, an international new religious movement and UFO religion which was founded in France in 1974, promotes a positive outlook towards human sexuality, including homosexuality. Its founder Raël recognised same-sex marriage, and a Raëlian press release stated that sexual orientation is genetic and it also likened discrimination against gay people to racism. Some Raëlian leaders have performed licensed same-sex marriages.

=== Santa Muerte ===
The cult of Santa Muerte is a new religious movement centered on the worship of Santa Muerte, a cult image, female deity, and folk saint which is popularly revered in Mexican Neopaganism and folk Catholicism. A personification of death, she is associated with healing, protection, and safe delivery to the afterlife by her devotees. Santa Muerte is also revered and seen as a saint and protector of the lesbian, gay, bisexual, transgender, and queer (LGBTQ) communities in Mexico, since LGBTQ+ people are considered and treated as outcasts by the Catholic Church, evangelical churches, and Mexican society at large. Many LGBTQ people ask her for protection from violence, hatred, disease, and to help them in their search for love. Her intercession is commonly invoked in same-sex marriage ceremonies performed in Mexico. The Iglesia Católica Tradicional México-Estados Unidos, also known as the Church of Santa Muerte, recognizes gay marriage and performs religious wedding ceremonies for homosexual couples. According to R. Andrew Chesnut, PhD in Latin American history and professor of Religious studies, the cult of Santa Muerte is the single fastest-growing new religious movement in the Americas.

=== Satanism ===
In both of the two primary mainstream modern Satanist denominations, sex is viewed as an indulgence, but one that should only be freely entered into with consent. The Satanic Temple appears to be more vocally supportive of the LGBTQIA+ community. Satanists from The Satanic Temple are pluralists, accepting bisexuals, lesbians, gays, transgender people, BDSM, and polyamorists. On 14 July 2013, The Satanic Temple travelled to the Mississippi gravesite of the mother of Westboro Baptist Church founder, Fred Phelps. They performed a 'pink mass' ritual, aiming to make Phelps believe that The Satanic Temple had "turned his mother gay".

LaVeyan Satanism is critical of Abrahamic sexual mores, considering them narrow, restrictive and hypocritical. The Eleven Satanic Rules of the Earth which are specific to the Church of Satan, only give two instructions regarding sex: "Do not make sexual advances unless you are given the mating signal" and "Do not harm little children", though the latter is much broader and encompasses physical and other abuse. This has been a consistent part of Church of Satan policy since its inception in 1966.

In a 2004 essay supporting same-sex marriage:

The Church of Satan is the first church to fully accept members regardless of sexual orientation and so we champion weddings/civil unions between adult partners whether they be of opposite or the same sex. So long as love is present and the partners wish to commit to a relationship, we support their desire for a legally recognized partnership, and the rights and privileges which come from such a union.

— Magister Peter H. Gilmore

Though the Church of Satan began marketing an anti-equality polo shirt in March 2015 just 3 months before the Supreme Court legalized gay marriage, to the criticism of some, their site states that their purpose in doing so was to "embrace the stratified & Darwinian reality of Nature to encourage strength, self-improvement & the mastery of diverse skills."

Some Theistic Satanists also oppose homophobia. The group Order of Nine Angles released several texts including homosexual versions of sex magic rites. However, the ONA-inspired Black Order, originally founded by Kerry Bolton, split into two separate groups because the new grandmaster, Abaaner Incendium (former editor of Key of Alocer) was openly homosexual and a transvestite who would later undergo gender-affirming surgery. The American section of the order therefore considered the new grandmaster unsuitable and formed the White Order of Thule. In July 1997, two members of the Misanthropic Luciferian Order committed the Keillers Park murder. According to the Svenska Mord website, the exact motives were never elucidated, but Satanism and homophobia may have been relevant factors. According to a later statement from the secretary of the band one of the perpetrators played in, the man had harassed them and was killed out of anger.

== See also ==
- History of human sexuality
- LGBTQ history
  - LGBTQ rights by country
  - List of LGBT-related organizations and conferences
  - Outline of transgender topics
  - Timeline of LGBTQ history
- Religion and sexuality
  - Homosexuality and religion
  - Side B Christian
  - Side A, Side B, Side X, Side Y (theological views)
  - LGBTQ themes in mythology
  - Religion and LGBTQ people
  - Religious views on same-sex marriage
  - Transgender people and religion
- Same-sex marriage
  - History of same-sex unions
  - Legal status of same-sex marriage
  - Timeline of same-sex marriage
- Societal attitudes toward homosexuality
- Third gender
- Two-spirit
