= Tu'er Ye =

Rabbit deity of the Chinese folk religion

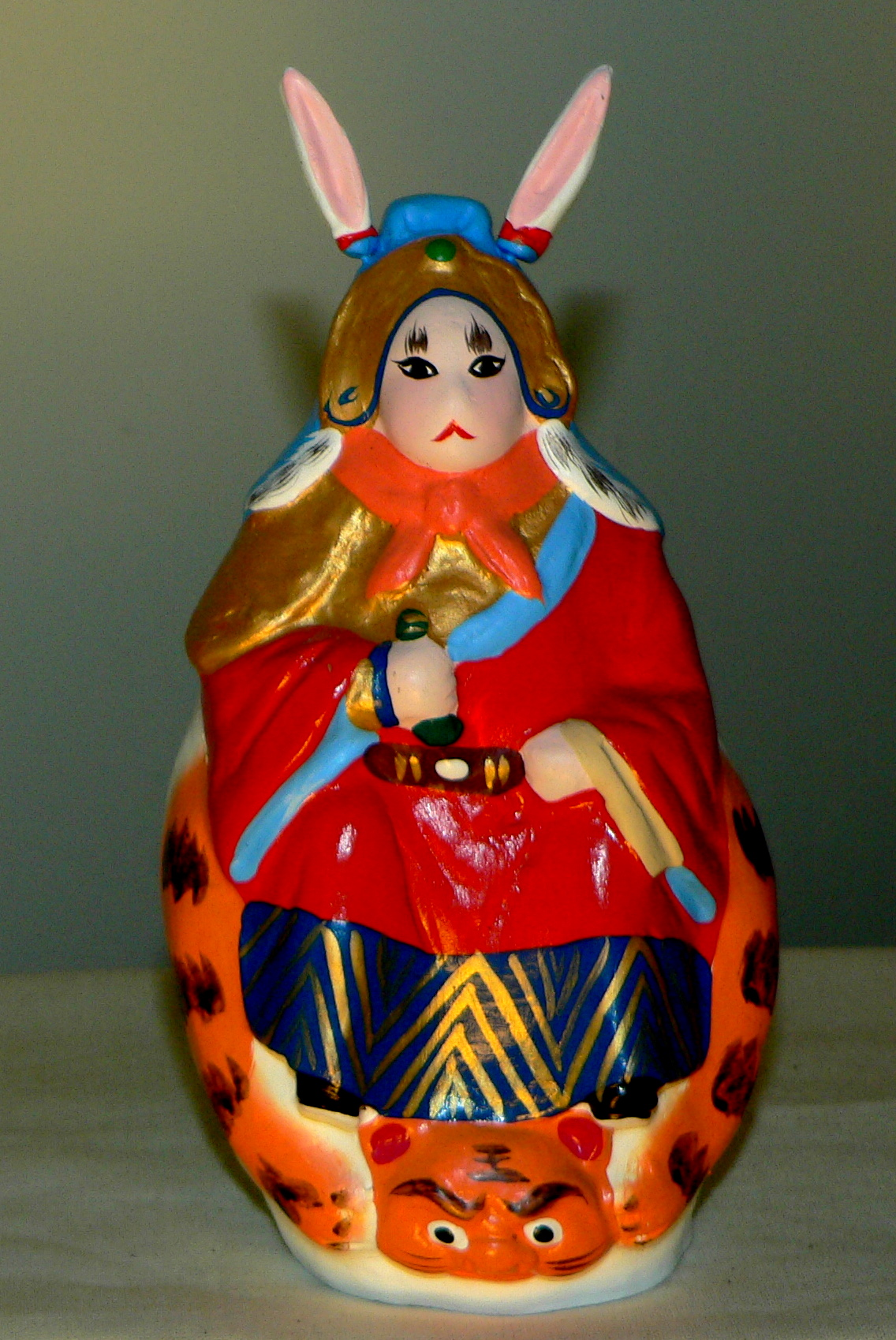
Sculpture of Tu'er Ye.

Tu'er Ye (Chinese: 兔兒爺; pinyin: Tù'eryé; lit. 'Lord Leveret'), also known as the Rabbit God, is a deity of Chinese folk religion unique to Beijing, where his sculptures are traditionally crafted. He is related with moon worship, as he is considered the moon rabbit of the goddess Chang'e. A frequent misnomer is "Tuye Er" (兔爺兒, "Rabbit God (as a) Youth"). Based on the correct Beijing dialect, it should be "Tu'er Ye" (兔兒爺).

In his traditional iconography, he rides a tiger, a dragon or a horse, but he is represented standing alone as well. The cult of the Rabbit God started in Beijing in 1906, later in the 20th century disappeared, and was resumed only in the late 2000s. He has a female counterpart, Tu'er Nainai (Chinese: 兔兒奶奶; pinyin: Tù'ernǎinai; lit. 'Lady Leveret'). However the two could be one and the same deity since in some legends, Tu'er Ye changed his appearance depending on what human clothing was donated to him by the people he helped. So Tu'er Nainai could simply be a cross-dressing Tu'er Ye. He is not to be confused with Tu'er Shen, a different cult of perhaps the same deity.

== Depiction in media works ==
- Tu'er Ye appears in the Chinese manhua and animated series You Shou Yan, however he is renamed to Tuye.

== See also ==
- Lunar deity
- Chang'e
- Tuershen
- Moon rabbit
