= Pixiu =

Chinese mythical hybrid creature

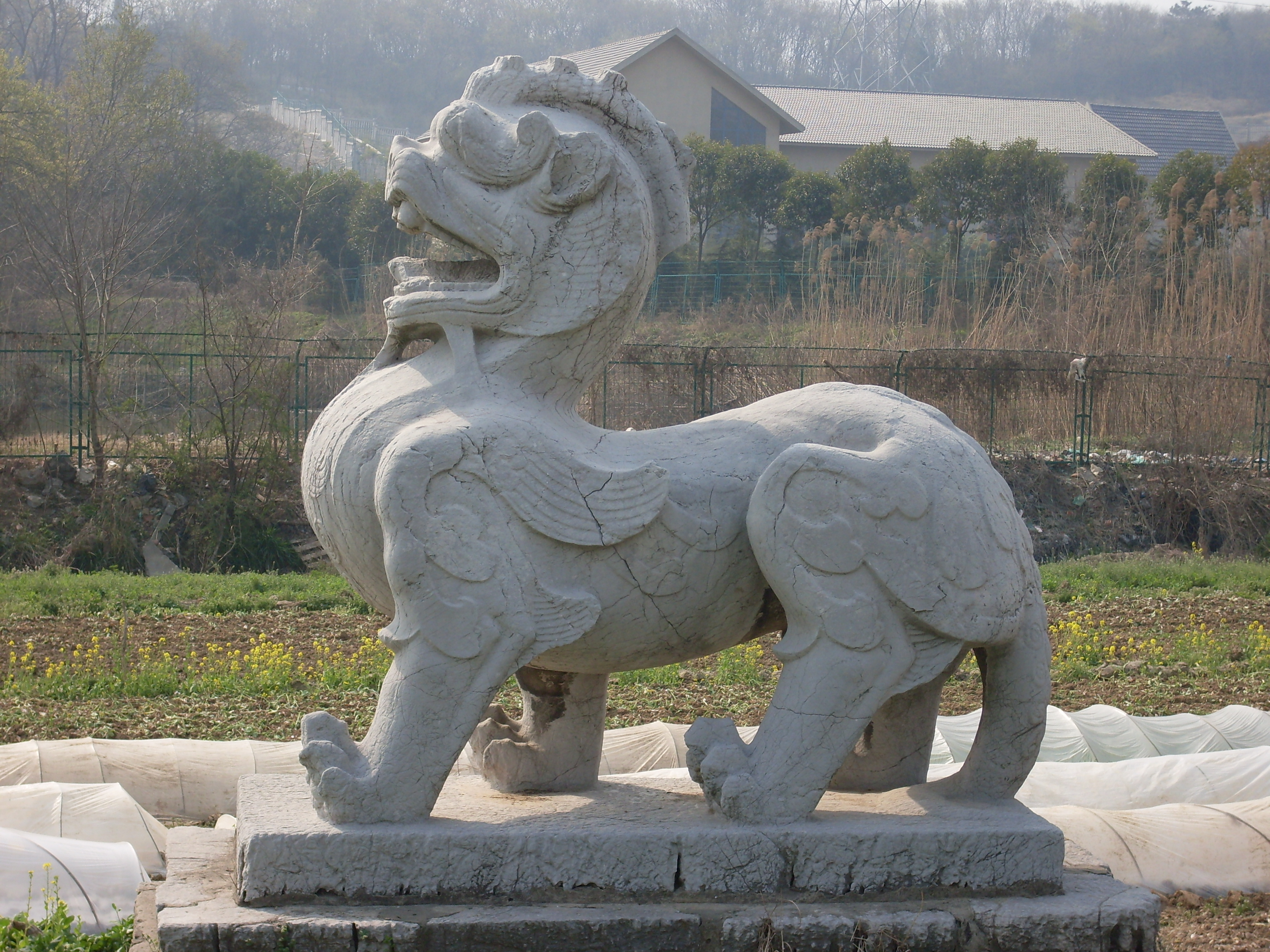
- Pixiu

Chinese name
- Chinese: 貔貅
Transcriptions
Standard Mandarin
- Hanyu Pinyin: píxiū
- Wade–Giles: pʻi^{2}-hsiu^{1}
- IPA: [pʰǐ.ɕjóʊ]
Yue: Cantonese
- Yale Romanization: pèihyāu
- Jyutping: pei4-jau1
- IPA: [pʰej˩.jɐw˥]

Alternative Chinese name
- Chinese: 辟邪
Transcriptions
Standard Mandarin
- Hanyu Pinyin: bìxié
- Wade–Giles: pi4-hsieh2
Southern Min
- Hokkien POJ: phiah-siâ, phek-siâ, phì-siâ

Vietnamese name
- Vietnamese alphabet: tỳ hưu
- Chữ Hán: 貔貅

Korean name
- Hangul: 비휴
- Hanja: 豼貅

Japanese name
- Kanji: 貔貅
- Hiragana: ひきゅう
Transcriptions
- Romanization: hikyū

The pixiu ([pʰǐ.ɕjóʊ]; Chinese: 貔貅) is a Chinese mythical hybrid creature. Pixiu are considered powerful protectors of the souls of the dead, xian, and feng shui practitioners, and resemble strong, winged lions. A Pixiu is an earth and sea variation, particularly an influential and auspicious creature for wealth, and is said to have a voracious appetite exclusively for gold, silver, and jewels. Therefore, traditionally to the Chinese, Pixiu have always been regarded as auspicious creatures that possessed mystical powers capable of drawing cai qi (財氣; "wealth") from all directions, and according to the Chinese zodiac, it is especially helpful for those who are going through a bad year.

There are two types of Pixiu that are categorised by their antlers. The one with two antlers is the female and is called a Bìxié, and the one with one antler is the male and is called a Tiānlù.

- Bìxié (辟邪; bìxié; pi-hsieh; lit. "to ward off evil spirits"): The female of the species wards off evil. It is also believed that Bìxié have the ability to assist anyone who is suffering from bad feng shui from having offended Tai Sui (太歲).
- Tiānlù (天祿; tiānlù; t'ien-lu): The male of the species is in charge of wealth. It is said to go out into the world to search for gold and other forms of wealth. When it returns to its master's house, the Bìxié is then said to guard the riches. Displaying Tiānlù at home or in the office is said to prevent wealth from flowing away.

Pixiu crave the smell of gold and silver and like to bring their masters money in their mouth. Statues of this creature are often used to attract wealth in feng shui.

Today, Pixiu are a popular design on jade pendants.

== Etymology ==
Sinologist Axel Schuessler (2007) states that in old texts pí (貔) referred to large panther-like cats. Minimally reconstructing 貔's Old Chinese pronunciation as *bi, Schuessler compares it to Tibetan: དབྱི།, Wylie: dbyi "lynx" then proposes a probable Sino-Tibetan etymology. Moreover, he sees possible cognacy with པི (pi) and བྱི (byi) in two Tibetan words for "cat", namely: པི་ཤི (pi shi) and བྱི་ལ (byi la) respectively. Elements པི (pi) and བྱི (byi) are either of native Tibetan origin or derived from Indic (cf. Hindi बिल्ला (billā) ← Sanskrit बिडाल (biḍāla)).

Xu Ke (徐珂) describes the 貔貅; pixiu as resembling either tigers or bears and having ashen white furs, the 貔; pi being male and the 貅; xiu female.

== Characteristics ==
Pixiu are auspicious, winged animals, written about in ancient Chinese history and heralded through the millennia by fantastic stories of powerful and grandiose feats of victory in battle. Their legend has been passed down through 2,000 years of Chinese lore. They have the head of a Chinese dragon, the body of a lion, and historically sport on their heads either one antler (male) or two antlers (female). In modern times, this legendary creature's historical physical appearance has been somewhat lost, and is now more commonly depicted with only one antler.

Ancient Chinese descriptions, depictions and stone carvings of Pixiu from the Han dynasty (206 BC – 220 AD) show the male with a single antler and the female with two. As with the Chinese phoenix, the common image today represents a single gender with one antler (male). Pixiu have protruding eyes and sharp teeth. There is one ancient stone sculpture variation found with hooves, but all Pixiu have wings. Many have a bifurcated (split) tail that hangs low and downward that covers its rear, a representative metaphor that they hold gold inside their stomachs but will not let it out.

Imperial Pixiu used during the Qing dynasty developed the physical characteristic of a fatter, more rotund body, indicating a stomach that could be loaded with unlimited amounts of gold and all forms of wealth and good fortune.

Due to their similar appearances, Pixiu are often confused with stone lions and qilin, but they can easily be distinguished from those two animals by its pair of feathered wings with which it can fly between Heaven and Earth.

In the Eastern Han dynasty, pixiu were thought to be able to fly into the realm of immortals or xian by Daoists and a minority of Confucianists.

== Mythology ==
One story of the Pixiu tells that it violated a law of Heaven by defecating on the floor of Heaven. When it was found out, it was punished by a spanking executed by the Jade Emperor. The spanking was hard enough to cause its rectum to be permanently sealed. This is why Pixiu can eat gold, silver and jewels but cannot expel it. This is one of the origins of the status of Pixiu statues as a symbol of the acquisition and preservation of wealth.

Another story describes the Pixiu as the well-behaved, youngest son of the Dragon King and was spoiled by its parents. One day, Pixiu played on the Dragon King's desk and accidentally broke a seal that represented the power of the Dragon King. The Dragon King became very angry and used magic to turn Pixiu into an animal. He then sealed his rectum and declared that from then on, Pixiu could only eat things representing wealth.

Pixiu have a reputation of being fierce creatures. The large fangs visible in their mouths are used to attack demons and evil spirits, draining their essence and converting it to wealth. Pixiu also guard against disease caused by these evil spirits. It is written that Pixiu patrol the Heavens to keep demons at bay and to protect their owners from all harm.

It was believed that the ferociously devoted Pixiu would always and constantly guard its master, even after he passed from this life onto the next world. It was also believed that Pixiu would help their masters ascend to heaven by flying them up to Heaven on their backs.

== History ==
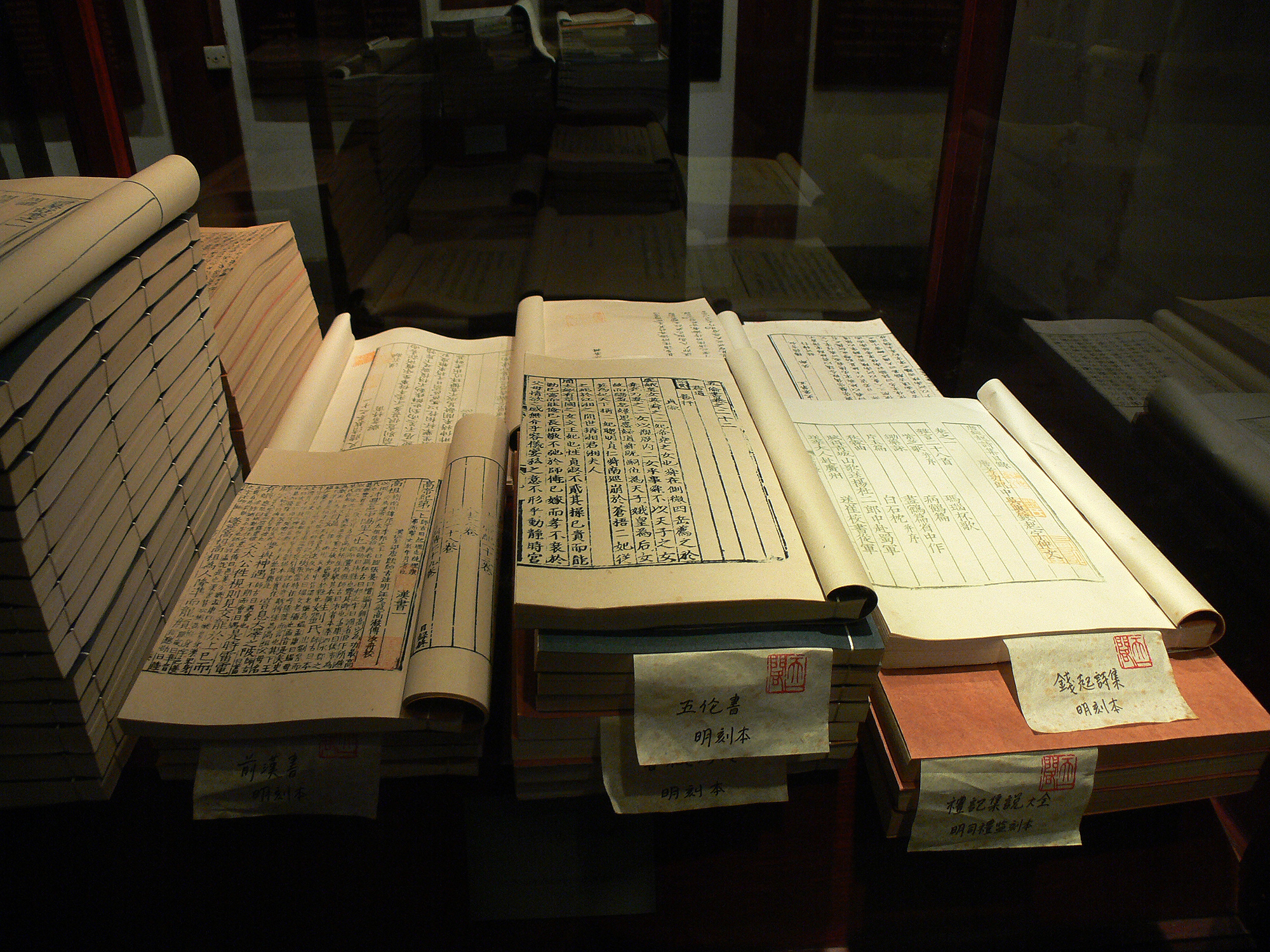
Book of Han, Tian Yi Chamber Library Collection

Pixiu appear to have their origin in the Han dynasty (206 BC–220 AD) where they are found mentioned and were originally called Táo bá in chapter 96 of the Book of Han.

An annotation describes the female and male Táo bá to have antlers like a deer, where the male (Tiānlù) has one antler, and the female (Bìxié) two. In tribute to the legend of the ferocity and prowess of the Pixiu in battle, it became synonymous with the army in ancient China. The word Pixiu, interpreted as meaning "fierce beast" and also "brave warrior", was used as a symbol on battle flags and banners.

Emperor Wu of the Han dynasty declared that the Pixiu, who obtained and guarded the Master's gold, would be forever known as the "Treasure of the Emperor". It is said the Emperor declared that only royal personage could possess a Pixiu and it was strictly forbidden for all others to own one, including officials. This law was kept through to the end of the Qing dynasty.

== Architecture ==
During China's history, Pixiu were commonly displayed in ancient architecture to ward off yin qi (陰氣) and to harness auspicious qi.

Statues of Pixiu are commonly found on the four corners of the roofs of houses, palaces and halls of the most important people such as the Chinese Emperor. The Pixiu sits behind the dragon, the phoenix, the winged horse, the seahorse, and other, similar creatures.

In ancient China, stone statues of Pixiu were also used as tomb guardians of Han dynasty emperors and other royal persons.

== Feng shui ==
In feng shui, Pixiu (aka Piyao in some modern cultural translations) is the heavenly variation of a creature of good fortune. They are said to have the power to assist anyone suffering from bad feng shui due to having offended Tai Sui.

== Gallery ==
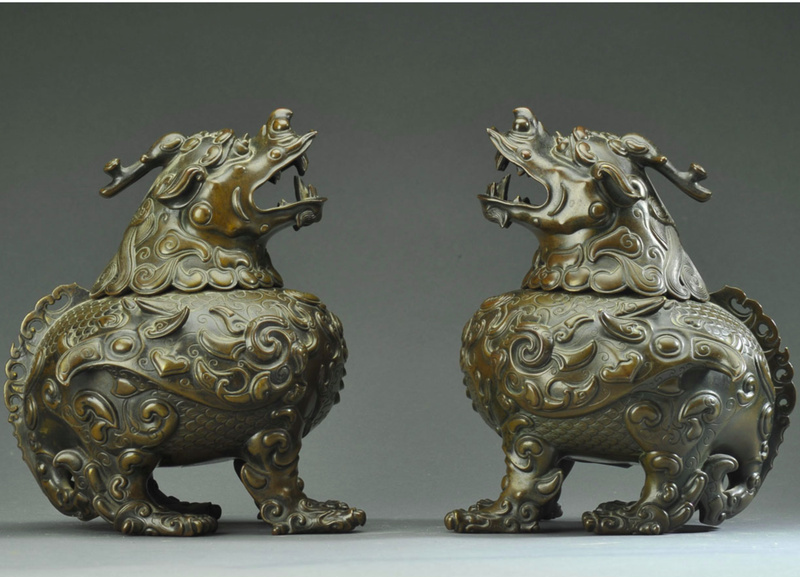

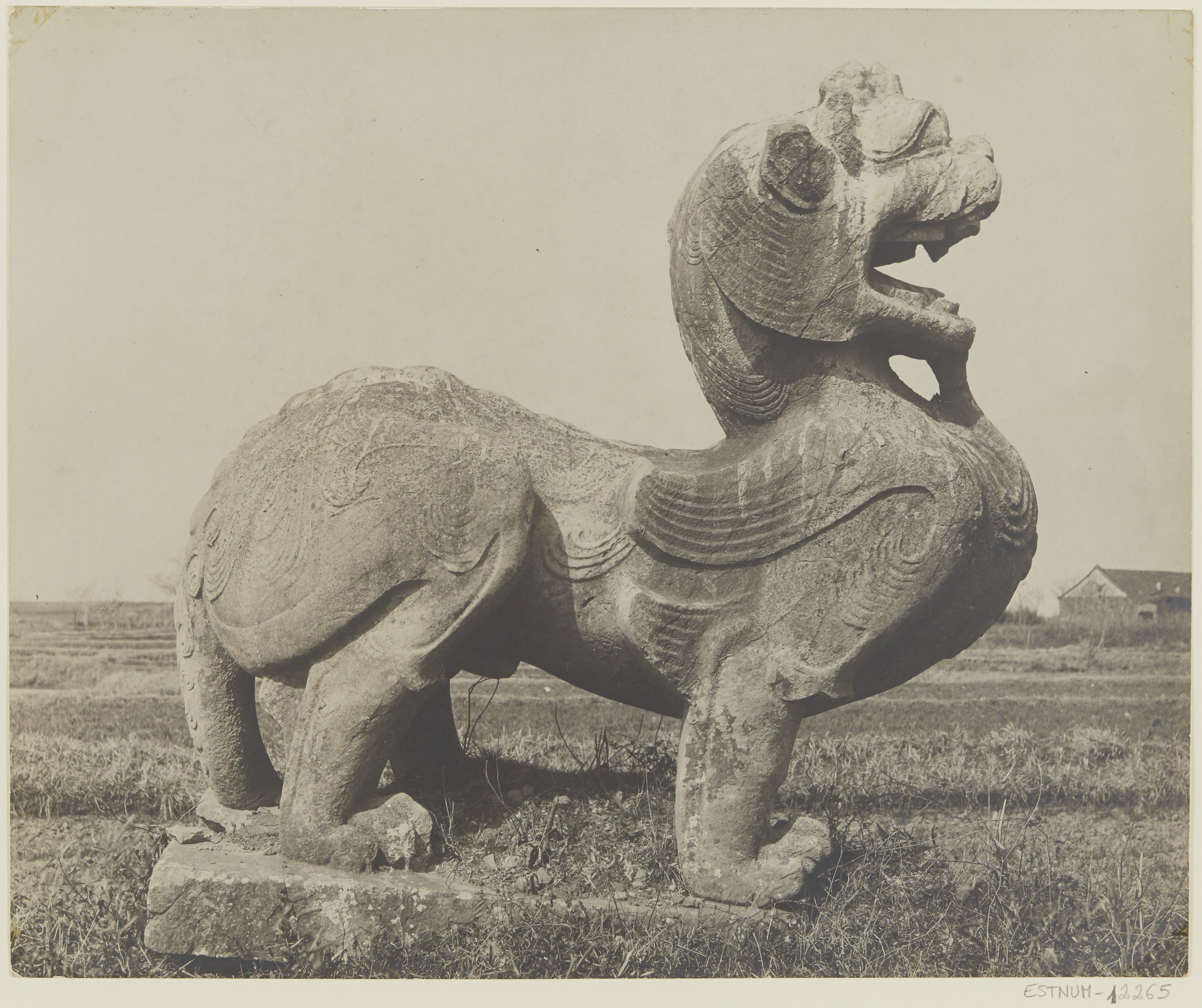
A Chinese Pixiu, (Chinese: 貔貅; pinyin: píxiū; Wade–Giles: P'i-hsiu) head of a Chinese dragon, body of a lion and with a pair of feathered wings, at the tomb of Emperor Wu of Southern Qi (Xiao Ze) in Danyang (near Nanjing, China).

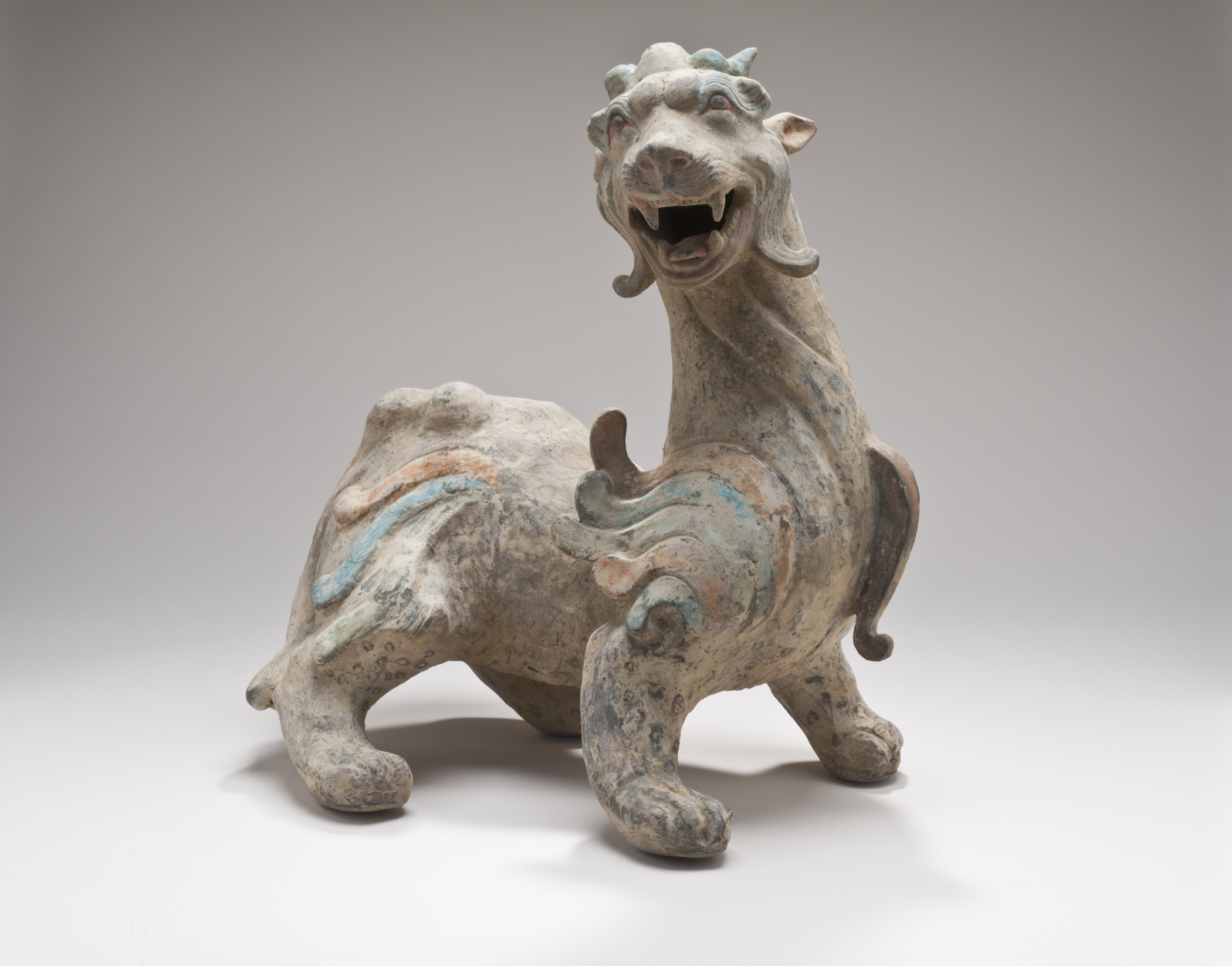
A sculpture of a Chinese Pixiu "Bìxié" − a female pixiu with two antlers. Los Angeles County Museum of Art (LACMA)

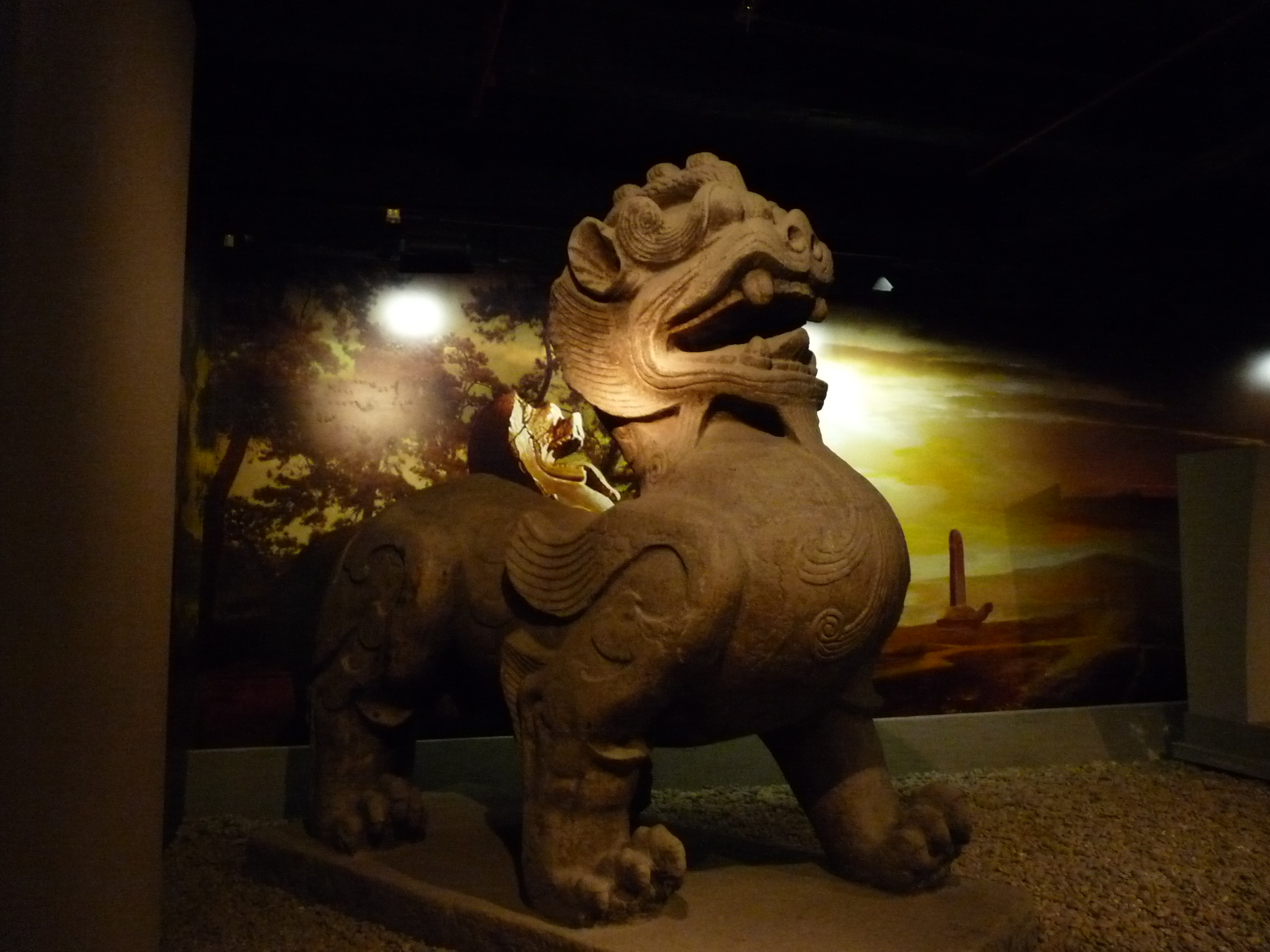
A Chinese pixiu, part Chinese dragon, part lion and with feathered wings, in Chaotian Palace, Nanjing

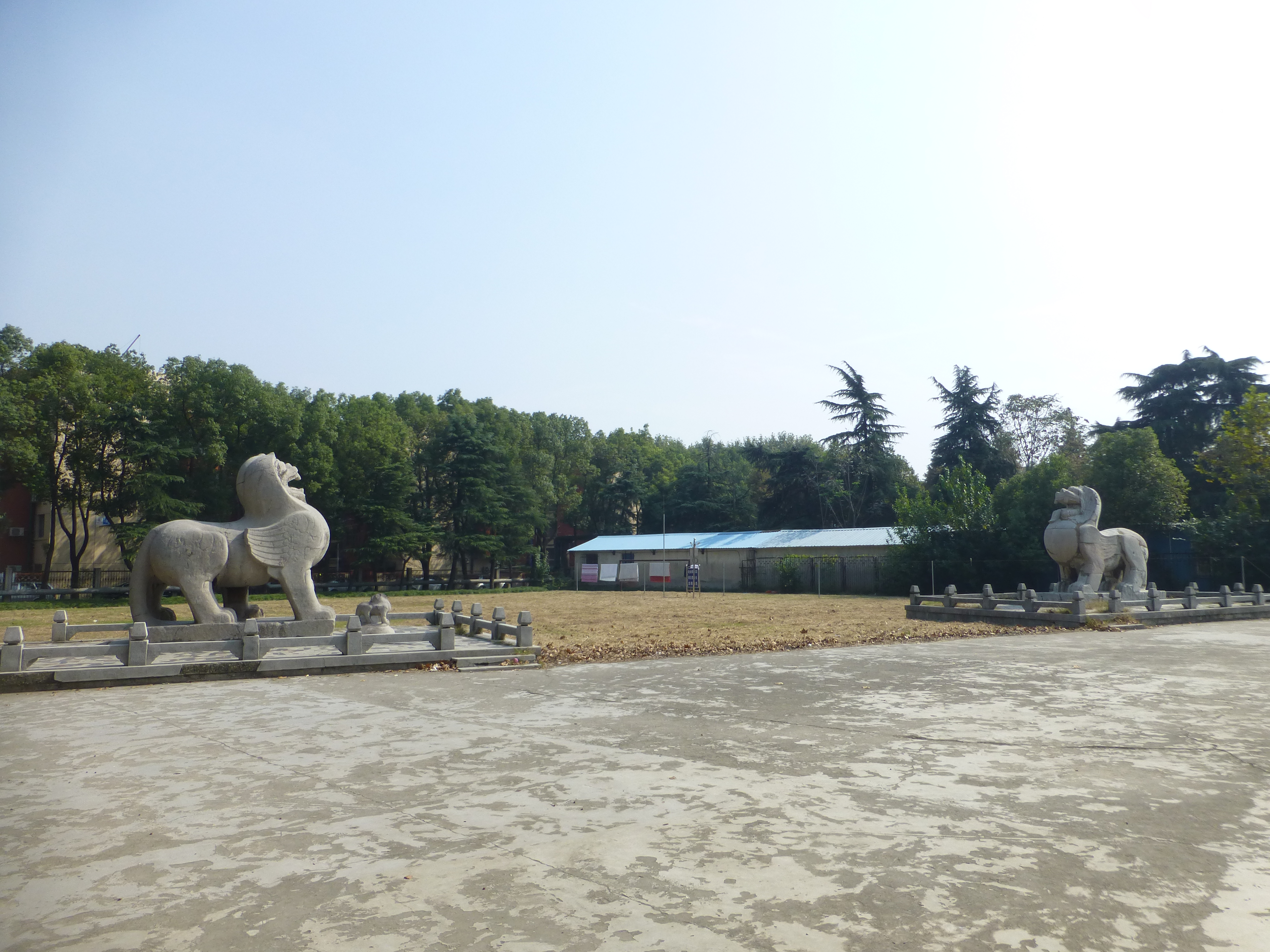
A very large pair of winged, stone pixiu guarding a tomb in China

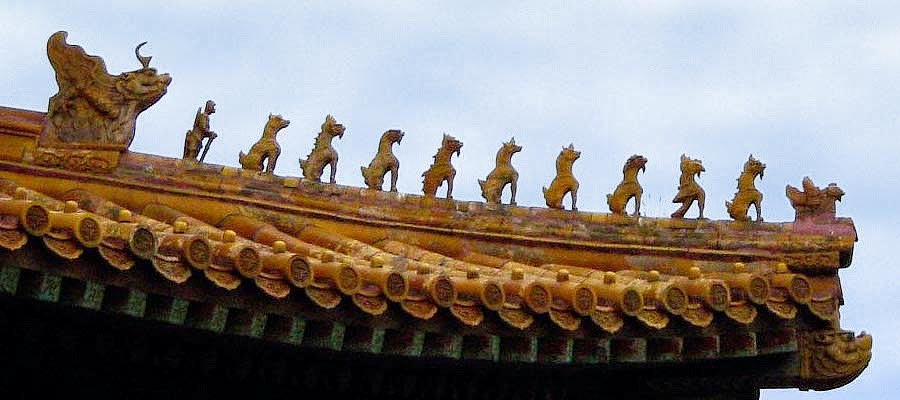
Ceramic figures decorating the Hall of Supreme Harmony at the Imperial Palace Museum. The 9 mystical beasts indicate the highest status in the empire for this building. Picture taken late September 2002 by Leonard G

== In popular culture ==
In Mulan. Pixiu is featured as a design on the sword of Fa Mulan's.

In DuckTales of 2017, Pixiu serves as a minor antagonist.

In American Born Chinese, Shiji Niangniang has a pet Pixiu that was turned into a dog, along with having his anus sealed, after he pooped in the Jade Emperor's pond.

In Yashahime: Princess Half-Demon, Pixiu as Hikyumaru serves as the next main antagonist with titled of Dark Destructive God after Kirinmaru.

In Fabulous Beasts (有兽焉), Tianlu (The Pixiu of Wealth) and Bixie (The Pixiu of Spirit Warding) are described as brothers and with both being part of the main character line in the story. All Pixius are white-furred and are shaped after a Corgi (According to Fabulous Jokes (You Shou Xi Hua) Scene 5). Tianlu has a light blue accents with a light blue target pattern on his thighs while Bixie has red accents with red 4 petal plum-blossom pattern on his thighs. In the story, Bixie is the more responsible brother while Tianlu is the more careless and enthusiastic one. Later in the story, another Pixiu named Qishiqi (77) joined the group after escaping Heaven. He has black accents with a black patterned target in a shape of a diamond and has a tag on his left ear labelled "77", since he isn't a true pixiu but an experiment from Heaven and relies on Heavenly Dew to survive. He has an excitable yet naive personality.

In the video game Overwatch, a Pixiu costume is available for the character Zenyatta.

== See also ==
- Chinese culture
- Chinese spiritual world concepts
- Feng shui
- Fenghuang
- Four symbols
- Imperial guardian lion
- Legendary creature
- Qilin
- Simurgh
- Xiezhi
