= Tu'er Shen =

Chinese deity of homosexual love and sex

- Male same-sex love, sexuality, and matchmaking
- Affiliation: Chinese folk religion, Taoism
- Animals: Rabbit

Tu'er Shen (traditional Chinese: 兔兒神; simplified Chinese: 兔儿神; pinyin: Tùrshén, The Leveret Spirit), Hu Tianbao or Tu Shen (Chinese: 兔神; pinyin: Tùshén, The Rabbit God), is a Chinese deity who manages love and sex between men. His name literally means "rabbit deity". His adherents refer to him as Ta Yeh (traditional Chinese: 大爺; simplified Chinese: 大爷; pinyin: dàyé, The Master).

In a folk tale from 17th century Fujian, a soldier is in love with a provincial official, and spies on him to see him naked. The official has the soldier tortured and killed, but he returns from the dead in the form of a leveret (a hare in its first year) in the dream of a village elder. The leveret demands that local men build a temple to him where they can burn incense in the interest of "affairs of men". The story ends:

According to the customs of Fujian province, it is acceptable for a man and boy to form a bond [qi] and to speak to each other as if to brothers. Hearing the villager relate the dream, the other villagers strove to contribute money to erect the temple. They kept silent about this secret vow, which they quickly and eagerly fulfilled. Others begged to know their reason for building the temple, but they did not find out. They all went there to pray.

== Legends ==
According to What the Master Would Not Discuss, written by Yuan Mei during the Qing dynasty, Tu'er Shen was a man named Hu Tianbao (胡天保) who fell in love with a very handsome imperial inspector of Fujian Province. One day he was caught peeping on the inspector through a bathroom wall, at which point he confessed his reluctant affections for the other man. The imperial inspector had Hu Tianbao sentenced to death by beating. One month after Hu Tianbao's death, he appeared to a man from his hometown in a dream, claiming that since his crime was one of love, the underworld officials decided to right the injustice by appointing him the god and safeguarder of homosexual affections.

After his dream the man erected a shrine to Hu Tianbao, which became very popular in Fujian, so much so that in late Qing times, the cult of Hu Tianbao was targeted for extermination by the Qing government.

The deity can be seen as an alternative to Yue Lao, the matchmaker god, for heterosexual relations.

== Cults ==
A slang term for homosexuals in late imperial China was "rabbits" which is why Hu Tianbao is referred to as the rabbit deity, though in fact he has nothing to do with rabbits and should not be confused with Tu'er Ye, the rabbit on the moon.

=== Government suppression ===
Images of Hu Tianbao show him in an embrace with another man. The sense that the villagers must keep the reason for the temple secret in the story may relate to pressure from the central Chinese authorities to abandon the practice. Qing dynasty official Zhu Gui (1731–1807), a grain tax circuit intendant of Fujian in 1765, strove to standardize the morality of the people with a "Prohibition of Licentious Cults". One cult which he found particularly troublesome was the cult of Hu Tianbao. As he reports,

The image is of two men embracing one another; the face of one is somewhat hoary with age, the other tender and pale. [Their temple] is commonly called the small official temple. All those debauched and shameless rascals who on seeing youths or young men desire to have illicit intercourse with them pray for assistance from the plaster idol. Then they make plans to entice and obtain the objects of their desire. This is known as the secret assistance of Hu Tianbao. Afterwards they smear the idol's mouth with pork intestine and sugar in thanks.

=== Modern interpretations ===
Although Tu'er Shen is popularly revered by some temples, some Taoist schools may have considered homosexuality as sexual misconduct throughout history, probably deeming it to be outside of marriage. However, many Taoism scriptures do not mention anything against same-gender relations, mostly maintaining neutrality.

The story may be an attempt to mythologize a system of male marriages in Fujian attested to by the scholar-bureaucrat Shen Defu and the 17th century writer Li Yu. The older man in the union would play the masculine role as a qixiong or "adoptive older brother", paying a "bride price" to the family of the younger man—it was said virgins fetched higher prices—who became the qidi, or "adoptive younger brother". Li Yu described the ceremony, "They do not skip the three cups of tea or the six wedding rituals- it is just like a proper marriage with a formal wedding." The qidi then moved into the household of the qixiong, where he would be completely dependent on him, be treated as a son-in-law by the qixiongs parents, and possibly even help raise children adopted by the qixiong. These marriages could last as long as 20 years before both men were expected to marry women in order to procreate.

Keith Stevens reports seeing images like these in Hokkien-speaking communities in Taiwan, Malaysia, Thailand and Singapore. Stevens refers to these images as 'brothers' or 'princes' and calls them Taibao (太保), which is probably a perversion of Tianbao. Stevens was usually told that the two figures in an embrace were brothers, and only in one temple in Fujian was he told that they were homosexuals.

The history of Hu Tianbao has been largely forgotten even by the temple keepers. However, there is a temple in Yonghe District, Taiwan that venerates Hu Tianbao in his traditional guise. The temple is known as the Hall of Martial Brilliance (威明堂).

== Revival ==
External videos
- Report by BBC News Chinese on the Tu'er Shen Temple in Taiwan, Youtube video

In 2006, a Taoist priest named Lu Wei-ming founded a temple for Tu'er Shen in Yonghe District, New Taipei City, Taiwan. Roughly 9,000 gay pilgrims visit the temple each year praying to find a suitable partner. The temple also performs a love ceremony for gay couples at the world's only religious shrine for homosexuals. As of 2020, the temple remains the only extant shrine to the deity as the original temple in Fujian, China has not yet been rebuilt. Some of the deity's followers have established altars dedicated to the god in their homes. Visitors to Tu'er Shen's temple in Taiwan have increased exponentially in the last decade, especially after the legalization of same-sex marriage in Taiwan.

== Depiction in media works ==
- He is the main character in the 2010 Taiwanese drama The Rabbit God's Matchmaking.
- In Andrew Thomas Huang's short film Kiss of the Rabbit God, Tu'er Shen seduces a restaurant worker.
- Tu'er Shen appears in the American Gods episode "The Rapture of Burning". He is portrayed by Daniel Jun.
- Tu’er Shen was added into Tokyo Afterschool Summoners as a playable character. The origin story of this character closely follows the origin of his inspiration, only he now has the ability to see into the near future, and enjoys parkour.
- Tuye from the Chinese manhua and animated series You Shou Yan is based on Tu'er Ye, however seems like a pun on Tu'er Shen as well, because he is overly attracted to the male character Sibuxiang, this being one of his main character traits.

== See also ==
- LGBT rights in Taiwan
- Homosexuality in China
