= Wei-ming temple =

Taoist LGBT temple in Taiwan

- 威明堂
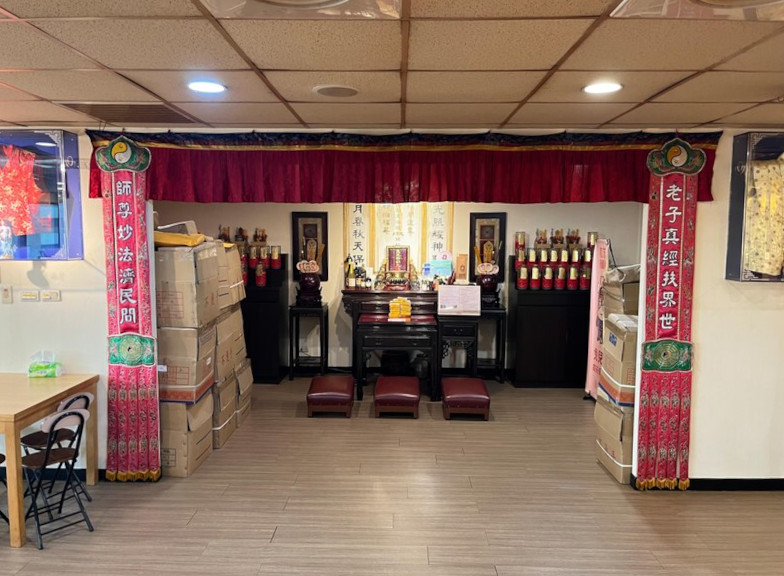
- Shrine dedicated to Tu'er Shen in the Wei-ming temple

Religion
- Affiliation: Taoist
- Deity: Tu'er Shen, other Taoist deities

Location
- Location: New Taipei City, Taiwan
- Interactive map of Wei-ming temple

Wei-ming temple (Chinese: 威明堂; pinyin: Wēi míngtáng), also known as Rabbit Temple, is a Taoist temple in New Taipei City, Taiwan dedicated to Tu'er Shen (lit. "The Rabbit God"), a Chinese deity associated with gay love and sex.

== History ==
Shrine dedicated to major Taoist gods inside the Wei-ming temple

Founded by Taoist priest Lu Wei-ming in 2006, the shrine is explicitly welcoming to gay congregants, and draws about 9,000 attendees per year. According to Wei-ming, the temple is the only shrine in the world dedicated to homosexuals, and has stated that his intent in creating the shrine was to create a welcoming place for a demographic subject to ostracism. While praying to the gods for a lover is a traditional Taoist custom, the Wei-ming temple's focus on sexuality is distinct, and a symbol of queer identity in Taiwanese society. The temple has been the target of sporadic protests by Taiwan's small Christian community, with a priest attempting to perform an exorcism of the shrine on one occasion. In recent years, the temple has received an increase in visitors, mainly well-wishers of the god Tu'er Shen.

== See also ==
- LGBT rights in Taiwan
- Religion in Taiwan
- Homosexuality in China
- Religion and LGBT people
