= You Shou Yan =

Chinese manhua and animated series

- Author: Xue Xia Mao Yao Zi
- Current status/schedule: Ongoing
- Publisher: Bilibili
- Genre: Comedy

You Shou Yan (Chinese: 有兽焉; pinyin: Yǒu shòu yān), also known as Fabulous Beasts, is a Chinese comedy manhua and animated series (donghua) created by Xue Xia Mao Yao Zi (靴下猫腰子) with animation by FENZ Co. Ltd. and published by Bilibili. The story features various beasts from Chinese mythology, many of which take the form of anthropomorphic animals. It is compiled in 5 books and has been listed on Chinese publisher Xiron's 2022 and 2023 "top 10 best-selling comic books" lists.

== Story ==
You Shou Yan tells the story of mythical beasts that live in the world of mortals. The protagonists are a group of beasts that have left the heavenly realm and ended up on Earth for various reasons. They often end up in comedic situations, many of which are at the expense of Tianlu the Pixiu or Sibuxiang. Over time, the amnesiac Tianlu's history is brought to light, and Sibuxiang struggles to keep the Pixiu from remembering his past, prevent heavenly officials from noticing the presence of Bixie, Tianlu's brother, and to manage his shop as an increasing number of beasts seek out his help.

== Production ==
You Shou Yan is a work written by author Xue Xia Mao Yao Zi, whose name translates as "Puss in Boots". From 15 October 2017, the webcomic was published every Tuesday, Thursday and Sunday through the author's official Weibo channel, which was affiliated with Feirenzai Studio. The comic started publication in paper after 1 December 2018.

Tencent Animation was given the contract to complete the work, but eventually stopped serialization. The author collaborated with Hokuto Penguin for the production of an audio comic.

Since 11 January 2021, the You Shou Yan comic has been published on the Bilibili platform. An animated adaptation of the comic was produced for the Bilibili platform, and its first season appeared 14 April 2023. The fourth season debuted on 2 August 2024.
