= List of Christian denominational positions on homosexuality =

This is a list of Christian denominational positions on homosexuality. The issue of homosexuality and Christianity is a subject of ongoing theological debate within and between Christian denominations and this list seeks to summarize the various official positions. Within denominations, many members may hold somewhat differing views on and even differing definitions of homosexuality.

== Adventism ==
The Seventh-day Adventist Church is opposed to same-sex sexual practices and relationships on the grounds that "sexual intimacy belongs only within the marital relationship of one man and one woman." They believe the Bible consistently affirms the pattern of heterosexual monogamy, and all sexual relations outside the scope of spousal intimacy are contrary to God's original plan.

== Ancient Church of the East ==
The Ancient Church of the East regards marriage as only being between one man and one woman, stating "We believe that faithful in Christian Marriage between a male and a female, free of impediments, is the only legitimate state for sexual expression between individuals."

== Anglicanism (including Episcopal) ==
The Anglican Communion is divided over the issue of homosexuality and in 2008, in response to the appointment of Bishop Gene Robinson in the Episcopal Church in the U.S. and a growing concern about the ambivalent position of the Church of England, the Anglican mother church, led to the founding of the Global Fellowship of Confessing Anglicans (FCA) - a global network of conservative Anglican churches representing more than two-thirds of Anglicans throughout the world.

The Church of England currently maintains (according to the statement Issues in Human Sexuality) that same-sex partnerships are acceptable for laypersons, and gay clergy may enter in a civil partnership as long as they are expected to give assurances of celibacy. The Lambeth Conference of 1998 called homosexuality "incompatible with Scripture" but this remains a purely advisory guideline as there are no communion-wide legislative bodies in the Anglican Church. On the other hand, in 2003 the Episcopal Church, which is the American body (province) of the Anglican Communion, approved Gene Robinson to the bishopric of the diocese of New Hampshire. Bishop Gene Robinson is the first openly gay (non-celibate) clergy to be ordained to the episcopate. Mary Glasspool became first open lesbian suffragan bishop to be consecrated a bishop in the Anglican Communion in the Diocese of Los Angeles of the Episcopal Church in the United States of America. In 2016, Nicholas Chamberlain, the Bishop of Grantham, became the first bishop in the Church of England to come out as gay and in a same-sex relationship.

In the Seventeenth Session of the General Synod of the Anglican Church of Australia in 2017, the Anglican Church of Australia passed a motion recognising "that the doctrine of our church, in line with traditional Christian teaching, is that marriage is an exclusive and lifelong union of a man and a woman, and further, recognises that this has been the subject of several General Synod resolutions over the past fifteen years". In 2018, the Primate of Australia and Archbishop of Melbourne, Philip Freier, released an ad clerum reiterating the current position that clergy cannot perform a same-sex marriage. The Anglican Church of New Zealand has experienced division and some bishops decided not to allow non-celibate homosexuals to become clergy. However, the Dunedin Diocese of the Anglican Church of New Zealand ordained an openly partnered gay man as deacon and, subsequently, as priest in 2005. The Dioceses of Auckland and Dunedin allow blessings for same-sex relationships. In 2014, the Anglican Church in New Zealand voted for "a resolution that will create a pathway towards the blessing of same-gender relationships, while upholding the traditional doctrine of marriage."

In response to several controversies in the Episcopal Church, among which was its changed policies relating to sexual morality, a number of alternative Anglican churches were founded during the 1960s and 1970s. They are customarily referred to as the churches of the Continuing Anglican movement.

Favoring more inclusion of same-sex relationships, "more liberal provinces that are open to changing Church doctrine on marriage in order to allow for same-sex unions include Brazil, Canada, New Zealand, Scotland, South India, South Africa, Spain, the US and Wales." In 2015, the Church in Wales published "a series of prayers which may be said with a couple following the celebration of a civil partnership or civil marriage." In 2016, the Anglican Church of Canada voted to allow same-sex marriages, but a second vote, in 2019, failed to reach the two-thirds majority required from the House of Bishops. In the Anglican Church of Southern Africa, the Diocese of Saldanha Bay proposed a prayer of blessing for same-sex marriages and civil unions, but the proposal did not pass. The archbishop of the Southern African Church, Thabo Makgoba, is "one among few church leaders in Africa to support same-sex marriage." However, in 2017 the Scottish Episcopal Church became the first major Christian church in the U.K. to allow same-sex marriages and in June 2018, the General Synod of Anglican Episcopal Church of Brazil did the same.

The Anglican Church in North America (ACNA) was formed in 2009 as yet another conservative alternative to the Episcopal Church. It and the Continuing Anglican churches are primarily made up of people who left the Episcopal Church, partially in opposition to its approval of homosexual relationships and gay clergy.

== Assyrian Church of the East ==
The Assyrian Church of the East does not recognize same-sex marriages, although it does not condemn any individuals, as it stated in 2015:

"Christian marriage must be between two people—male and female—who are open to the natural and free gift of life to be conceived of them...Marriage as a natural human relationship, across different cultures and religions, has always been about the creation of families for the ordered and thriving continuance of the human race. Christian marriage particularly, is that and more...The Church of the East remains ever committed to her indelible and absolute orthodox and catholic faith. As such, it cannot bless or solemnize any marriage that is not committed to the Scriptural principles, nor do the Church's sacred ministers have the authority to attempt to do so, under any condition...Finally, we remind our children in Christ that we are not to condemn anyone but must always seek to make the Gospel known in as respectful and loving a heart as possible."

== Baptists ==
Most Baptist associations in the world only support marriage between a man and a woman.

Some Baptist associations allow local churches to decide about blessings of same-sex marriage, such as the American Baptist Churches USA, the Progressive National Baptist Convention (USA), the Cooperative Baptist Fellowship (USA), the National Baptist Convention, USA and the Baptist Union of Great Britain.

Some Baptist associations support blessings of same-sex marriage, such as the Alliance of Baptists (USA), the Baptist Peace Fellowship of North America (USA), the Canadian Association for Baptist Freedoms, the Aliança de Batistas do Brasil, the Fraternidad de Iglesias Bautistas de Cuba, the Open Baptists Association (Australia) and the Association of Welcoming and Affirming Baptists (international).

== Chaldean Catholic Church ==
After Pope Francis indicated his approval of priests to bless individuals in same-sex unions in December 2023, the Chaldean prelate Francis Y. Kalabat of the Chaldean Catholic Church stated that a priest can bless any individual, regardless of their disposition, though the civil union itself cannot be blessed:

The Church welcomes and invites all in their imperfections to come forward to ask for a blessing. Nevertheless, "he [God] does not and cannot bless sin: he blesses sinful man, so that he may recognize that he is part of his plan of love and allow himself to be changed by him... For the above mentioned reasons, the Church does not have, and cannot have, the power to bless unions of persons of the same sex in the sense intended above." In conclusion, a priest is welcome to bless any individual regardless of their state of life, however, no priest is to call upon a blessing for any persons in such a way as to simulate or suggest that it is a blessing for the civil union of a same-sex couple.

== Christian Church (Disciples of Christ) ==
In July 2013, the General Assembly of the Disciples of Christ issued a "Sense of the Assembly" resolution (GA-1327 "Becoming a People of Grace and Welcome to All") that (in part) acknowledges that people within society and within the church have been "devalued and discriminated against... because of their sexual orientation and/or gender identity," calls for the church to "welcome to all God's children though differing in... sexual orientation, (and/or) gender identity," and that it "affirm(s) the faith, baptism and spiritual gifts of all Christians regardless of their sexual orientation or gender identity, and that neither are grounds for exclusion from fellowship or service within the church, but are a part of God's good creation." Through this resolution, the General Assembling endorsed the ordination of LGBT clergy. GA-1327 also states, however, that local congregations have final say over matters of consciences.

Local Disciples of Christ congregations have also performed same-sex marriages (such as the First Christian Church of Davenport), although the General Assembly has no official policy on same-sex marriages.

== Christian Reformed Church in North America ==
The Christian Reformed Church in North America has maintained the stance since the 1970s that homosexuality is the direct result of a "broken," sinful world, but that the Church should offer a compassionate community for Christian homosexuals. "Homosexualism" (explicit homosexual behavior) is considered disobedience to God's will revealed in Scripture. Celibate and repentant gays and lesbians should not be denied any right granted to heterosexuals. They have the right to maintain office and be an active member in a congregation, as their gifts can still be used to glorify God. The Church must provide support for homosexuals to find "healing and wholeness" in their "broken sexuality".

Although the First Christian Reformed Church of Toronto (also the first CRC congregation to call a woman minister) voted to allow gays and lesbians in committed partnerships as elders and deacons, this decision was later rescinded in the face of pressure from Classis Toronto (regional gathering of churches).

== Community of Christ ==
The Community of Christ officially decided to extend the sacrament of marriage to same-sex couples where gay marriage is legal, to provide covenant commitment ceremonies where it is not legal, and to allow the ordination of people in same-sex relationships to the priesthood. However, this is only in the United States, Canada, and Australia. The church does have a presence in countries where homosexuality is punishable by law, even by death, so for the protection of members in those nations, full inclusion of LGBT individuals is limited to the countries where this is not the case. Individual viewpoints do vary, and some congregations may be more welcoming than others. Furthermore, the church has proponents for support of both traditional marriage and same-sex marriages. The First Presidency and the Council of Twelve will need to approve policy revisions recommended by the USA National Conference.

== Eastern Orthodox Church ==
The Eastern Orthodox Church holds the opinion that sexuality, as we understand it, is part of the fallen world only. In Eastern Orthodox theology, both monasticism and marriage are paths to salvation (sotiria in Greek; literally meaning, 'becoming whole'). Celibacy is the ideal path of exclusive concern for the Kingdom of God, exemplified in monasticism, while marriage is a reflection of the Messianic covenant and blessed under the context of true unitive love ("Man must love his wife as Jesus loved his Church": this phrase is part of the Orthodox marriage rite) with openness to procreation ("bearing fruit"). This context can be interpreted by the non-Orthodox as not being exclusive of homosexuality; whereas it is seen as exclusive of homosexuality by all Orthodox Christians. Traditionally, the Christian East has maintained a comparatively non-legalistic view of sin (see above), in which homosexuality is spiritually disordered. Although some members of the Church may have assumed an active role in encouraging negative social stereotypes against unrepentant homosexuals, they misrepresent the stance of the Orthodox Church, which does not promote judgment of people but judgment of actions. However, several prominent members of the clergy have made statements condemning homosexuality.

All jurisdictions, such as the Orthodox Church in America, have taken the approach of welcoming people with homosexual feelings and emotions, while encouraging them to work towards overcoming its harmful effects in their lives, while not extending the holy mysteries (sacraments) to people who seek to justify homosexual activity.

The Assembly of Canonical Orthodox Bishops of North and Central America, the highest Orthodox Christian representative body in the Americas, reaffirmed in a statement in September 2013 that "the Orthodox Christian teaching on marriage and sexuality, firmly grounded in Holy Scripture, two millennia of Church Tradition, and Canon Law, holds that the sacrament of marriage consists in the union of a man and a woman, and that authentic marriage reflects the sacred unity that exists between Christ and His Bride, the Church". "Acting upon any sexual attraction outside of sacramental marriage, whether the attraction is heterosexual or homosexual, alienates us from God". Moreover, the Assembly reminded that "persons with homosexual orientation are to be cared for with the same mercy and love that is bestowed on all of humanity by our Lord Jesus Christ".

LGBT activism within Orthodox Christianity has been much less widespread than in Roman Catholicism and many Protestant denominations. In 1980, the group Axios was founded in Los Angeles to affirm and advocate for sexual minorities within the Orthodox Church, and has since started several other chapters in the United States, Canada, and Australia.

== Jehovah's Witnesses ==
Jehovah's Witnesses consider same-sex sexual activity to be sinful, but recognize that some people may be prone to homosexuality, including members of their congregation. Members are required to abstain from any sexual behavior outside of marriage, including homosexual behaviour, which is listed as a serious sin, but are told not to hate homosexual individuals. Their literature has stated that Christians should not make homosexuals the target of ridicule or harassment. They believe that God intended marriage to be a permanent and an intimate bond between a man and a woman, and, regarding same-sex marriage, they have stated that it "cannot give homosexuality a cloak of respectability", and are told to avoid debates about the legality of homosexuality: "Even when the laws of the land are in conflict with their Bible-trained conscience, Jehovah's Witnesses do not engage in protests or any form of political campaigns in order to change such laws."

== Church of Jesus Christ of Latter-day Saints ==
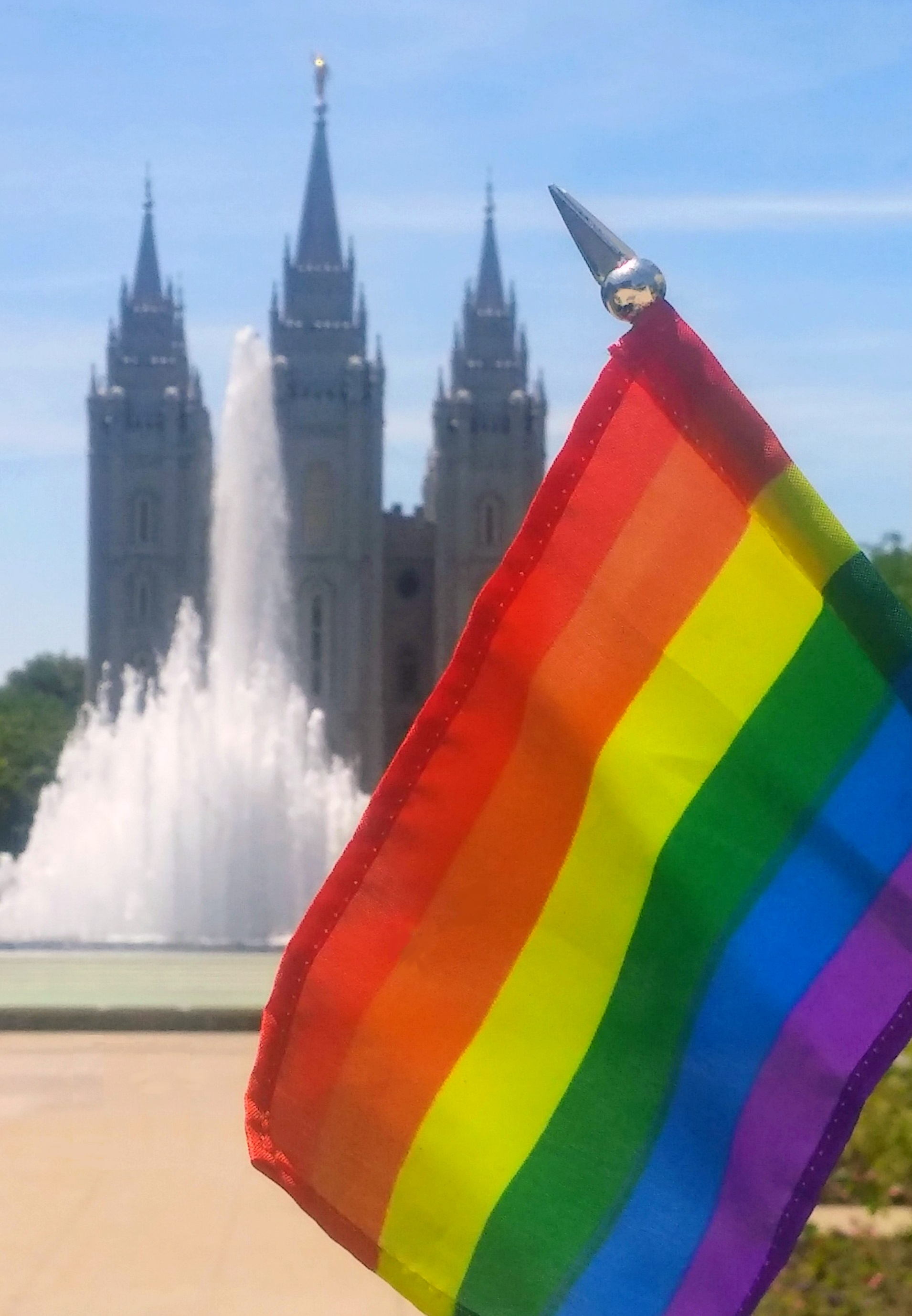
An LGBT Pride flag in front of the LDS Salt Lake Temple.

All same-sex sexual activity is forbidden by Mormonism's largest denomination the Church of Jesus Christ of Latter-day Saints (LDS Church) in its law of chastity, and the church teaches that God does not approve of same-sex marriage. Adherents who participate in same-sex sexual behavior may face church discipline. Members of the church who experience homosexual attractions, including those who self-identify as gay, lesbian, or bisexual remain in good standing in the church if they abstain from same-sex marriage and all sexual relations outside an opposite-sex marriage, but all, including those participating in same-sex activity and relationships, are allowed to attend weekly church worship services. However, in order to receive church ordinances such as baptism, and to enter church temples, adherents are required to abstain from same-sex relations or any sexual activity outside a legal marriage between one man and one woman. Additionally, in the church's plan of salvation noncelibate gay and lesbian individuals will not be allowed in the top tier of heaven to receive exaltation unless they repent, and a heterosexual marriage is a requirement for exaltation.

The church previously taught that homosexuality was a curable condition and counseled members that they could and should change their attractions and provided therapy and programs with that goal. From 1976 until 1989 even celibate gay people were subject to excommunication. Church publications now state that "individuals do not choose to have such attractions", its church-run therapy services no longer provides sexual orientation change efforts, and the church has no official stance on the causes of homosexuality. These current teachings and policies leave homosexual members with the option of potentially harmful attempts to change their sexual orientation, entering a mixed-orientation opposite-sex marriage, or living a celibate lifestyle without any sexual expression (including masturbation).

The LDS Church has campaigned against government recognition of same-sex marriage, and the topic of same-sex marriage has been one of the church's foremost public concerns since 1993. The church's policies and treatment of LGBT people has long been a source of controversy both within and outside the church. They have also been a significant cause of disagreement and disaffection by members.

== Lutheranism ==
=== United States ===
The Evangelical Lutheran Church in America, the largest Lutheran church body in the United States, allows for LGBTQ+ marriage and ordination of LGBTQ+ clergy. ELCA policy states that LGBTQ+ individuals are welcome and encouraged to become members and to participate in the life of the congregation. The ELCA has provided supplemental resources for the rite of marriage in Evangelical Lutheran Worship which use inclusive language and are suitable for use in LGBTQ+ marriage ceremonies. The group ReconcilingWorks supports the full inclusion of LGBTQ+ members in Lutheran churches in the ELCA, and provides resources to assist ELCA congregations in becoming more welcoming communities for LGBTQ+ persons. ReconcilingWorks recognizes ELCA congregations that have committed to embracing LGBTQ+ persons as Reconciling in Christ congregations.

The current policy on LGBTQ+ inclusion in the ELCA developed over a period of several years. During the national meeting in 2005, delegates voted against a measure that would have allowed non-celibate gay ordination and the blessing of same-sex unions by 503 against to 490 in favor. On 21 August 2009, the ELCA voted 559 to 451 in favor of allowing non-celibate LGBTQ+ persons in committed monogamous relationships to become ordained ministers. Another motion passed at the 2009 Assembly directed its leaders to develop a rite of blessing for same-sex unions. In 2013, the ELCA elected Guy Erwin as their first openly gay bishop.

The Lutheran Church – Missouri Synod (LCMS), the second largest Lutheran church body in the United States, does not permit same-sex marriage and does not ordain homosexuals. The LCMS Synodical President Gerald Kieschnick was present to register the objections of the LCMS to the ordination of homosexuals at the ELCA Churchwide Assembly in 2009.

The Wisconsin Evangelical Lutheran Synod (WELS), the third largest Lutheran church body in the United States, does not permit same-sex marriage and does not ordain homosexuals.

=== Canada ===
In 2006, Lionel Ketola became the first person in a same-sex marriage to be appointed vicar (intern) of an Evangelical Lutheran Church in Canada (ELCIC) congregation. This occurred at Newmarket, Ontario. Later that year, the Eastern Synod of the ELCIC voted to allow a "local option" for blessing same-sex unions. The national church, which had previously rejected such a proposal, proceeded to assert that it alone had the authority to make such a decision. The National Church Council agreed in a September ruling, but promised to bring forward another motion authorizing the local option for approval at the 2007 National Convention.

In 2011, the National Convention of the Evangelical Lutheran Church in Canada approved a motion that allows rostered ministers to "preside at or bless legal marriages according to the laws of the province within which they serve". Since same-sex marriage was legalized in Canada in 2005 through the Civil Marriage Act this permitted ELCIC clergy to bless same-sex marriages. This same motion also permitted the ordination of openly-gay pastors and blessing of clergy in same-sex relationships. At the same convention, the ELCIC issued a statement on human sexuality. This statement recognizes the diversity of sexual orientations and advocates for inclusion of all people within the church.

=== Europe ===
Most Lutheran and united state churches in Germany, Lutheranism's country of origin, are liberal, viewing homosexuality as moral and allow gay and lesbian clergy. Most of the Lutheran and united churches in Germany are blessing same-sex unions. In general, some churches of the Evangelical Church in Germany in the more rural parishes are against blessing same-sex unions, while most other churches do allow them.

In 2006, the Church of Sweden allowed blessings of same-sex unions, and in 2009 allowed same-sex marriage and the ordination of gay clergy. KG Hammar, former Archbishop of Uppsala and primate of the Church of Sweden, has been very vocal in supporting gay and lesbian Lutherans. In 2009, Eva Brunne became the first lesbian woman to be elected as a bishop, in the Diocese of Stockholm.

The Church of Iceland allows same-sex marriages.

The Lutheran Church of Norway was divided, with 6 of 11 bishops accepting homosexual practice as moral, even though the church officially rejects it. But in 2015 the Church of Norway allowed the blessing of same-sex unions. In 1993 lesbian Norway bishop Rosemarie Köhn was ordained. She was married with Susanne Sønderbo.

Since 2012, the Church of Denmark has allowed same-sex marriages. However, some controversy has arisen over the constitutionality of this move, as the Danish Constitution requires the state church to uphold the Lutheran doctrine, which states that homosexual acts are sinful.

The Evangelical Lutheran Church of Finland is divided on the issue and does not approve of same-sex marriages, though many bishops have expressed their acceptance for homosexual unions. As of October 2010, the Church of Finland allows, but does not oblige its clergy to pray for same-sex couples.

The United Protestant Church of France and the United Protestant Church in Belgium allow the blessing of same-sex marriages.

=== Australia and New Zealand ===
The Lutheran Church of Australia and Lutheran Church of New Zealand, which are both closely tied, reject same-sex unions, and affirm that homosexual acts are immoral.

== Mennonite Churches ==
The Mennonite church has multiple LGBT-affirming denominations. However, acceptance of LGBT Christians varies widely. No Mennonite Churches in North or South America have officially endorsed same-sex marriage, but some have taken steps towards this practice. In the Netherlands, same-sex marriages can be both ordained and conducted by the Mennonite Church since 2001.

The Supportive Communities Network brings together LGBTQ affirming churches and universities. This is coordinated through the Brethren Mennonite Council on Lesbian, Gay, Bisexual and Transgender Interests with over 70 participating congregations. In February 2014, the Mountain States Conference of the Mennonite Church USA approved the ministerial license and ordination of an openly lesbian pastor.

In contrast, some Mennonite pastors who performed same-sex unions have had their credentials revoked by their conference and some within the Mennonite Church USA have had their credentials reviewed without any disciplinary actions taken. A small number of Mennonite churches have been censured or disciplined for not expelling openly homosexual members.

The Pink Menno Campaign is a parachurch organization that advocates for the inclusion of LGBT Christians for membership, marriage and ordination in Mennonite churches. The Welcome Committee is an ad hoc group that issued an open letter to Mennonite churches defending inclusion of LGBT members and encourages conversation in churches about the issue.

The Conservative Mennonite churches, which observe traditional Conservative Anabaptist practices (such as head coverings and modest dress) completely forbid homosexual marriage. In these churches and also in their conferences, homosexuality is seen as sinful. Homosexual marriage is seen as a sin and against the Biblical teaching of a marriage between one man and one woman.

== Methodism ==
=== Timeline of changing attitudes ===
Since 1972, the United Methodist Church (UMC), as its official position on homosexuality, has maintained the Book of Discipline and had until May 2024 declared "homosexual practice" to be "incompatible with Christian teaching." Following the 1972 incompatibility clause, other restrictions were added at subsequent General Conferences. Until May 2024, the Book of Discipline prohibited the ordination of "practicing, self-avowed homosexuals"," blessing or presiding over same-sex unions by clergy, the use of UMC facilities for same-sex union ceremonies, and the use of Church funds for "gay caucuses", or other groups that "promote the acceptance of homosexuality".

Despite this language, members of the Church were not of one mind on this issue during the years from 1972 to 2024. Preceding the incompatibility clause, the Book of Discipline clearly stated that "homosexual persons, no less than heterosexual persons, are individuals of sacred worth". Some believe that this "sacred worth" clause stands in contradiction to the following statement regarding the incompatibility of homosexual practice with Christian teaching. The Book of Discipline affirms that all persons, both heterosexual and homosexual, are included in the ministry of the church and can receive the gift of God's grace. While the Book of Discipline supports the civil rights of homosexual persons and rejects the abuse of homosexuals by families and churches, it also calls for laws defining marriage as a union between one man and one woman.

Unsuccessful efforts were made to pass resolutions to "fully include gay, lesbian, bisexual and transgender persons in the life of the Church" at General Conferences after the introduction of the incompatibility clause in 1972; delegates from annual conferences in the Northeast and on the West Coast typically voted to do so, but are outnumbered by those from the Southeast and Africa.

Some of these issues came before the Judicial Council. On 31 October 2005, the Council undertook two measures on this topic. Firstly, the Council upheld the revocation of Irene Elizabeth Stroud's clergy status for disclosing she is openly lesbian. The council also rendered a decision allowing a Virginia pastor to deny church membership to a gay man. The latter decision appeared to UMC LGBT proponents to contradict both the Constitution and membership policies of the United Methodist Church which stipulate that membership shall be open to all persons "without regard to race, color, national origin, status or economic condition". The Judicial Council had previously found that the word "status" applies to gay, lesbian, bisexual and transgender persons (See Decision 1020). Decision 1032 created vigorous debate on the level of autonomy individual pastors and congregations have in interpreting and applying Church doctrine.

On May 1, 2024 the UMC allowed same-sex weddings and struck down the 40-year ban on gay clergy.

=== Methodist Church of Great Britain ===
The Methodist Church of Great Britain Within the Methodist Church of Great Britain, people have many views about human relationships, sexuality and the nature and purpose of marriage.

==== On Inclusion ====
In 1993, the Methodist Conference passed six resolutions on human sexuality (see below), including a Resolution 6 which "recognized, affirmed and celebrated the participation and ministry of lesbian and gay people in the Methodist Church". Furthermore, it called on the Methodist people to begin a pilgrimage of faith to combat repression and discrimination, to work for justice and human rights and to give dignity and worth to people whatever their sexual orientation. In passing these resolutions, the Methodist Conference made its opposition to homophobia known.

==== On Marriage ====
In 2021, the Methodist Conference reviewed its position on same-sex marriage and altered the denomination's definition of marriage to: A) Marriage can only be between a man and a woman B) Marriage can be between two people

As of March 2023 every Methodist local church in Britain has the right to decide whether they wish to register to perform same sex marriage. However presbyters are not required to perform them if their religious beliefs align with the first definition.

==== On Homophobia ====
The Methodist Church of Great Britain has issued the following definition of homophobia, which is supported by supplementary guidance. Homophobia is any statement, policy or action which denies the image of God in another person due to their actual or perceived sexual orientation; which is, treating someone in a discriminatory manner because of their actual or perceived sexual orientation. Homophobic attitudes, words, and behaviours are inconsistent with the nature of Christian conduct and a violation of the worth and dignity of all people. Homophobia can be experienced in a number of ways, including:

1. Physical violence or emotional or psychological abuse, including the threat of or incitement to such behaviour (which may also be deemed hate crimes in law).
2. Applying stereotypes and assumptions to people based on their sexual orientation.
3. Using language that is hostile, hurtful or offensive in its intent.
4. Abusive or coercive 'spiritual practices' (i.e. demanding or requiring repentance or participation in healing or other types of service).

==== Context: the 1993 Resolutions on Human Sexuality ====
At the annual Methodist Conference in 1993 in Derby, following long debate at all levels of the Church's life on the basis of a detailed report, the Methodist Church considered the issues of human sexuality. At the end of the debate, the Conference passed in the same session a series of resolutions (known as 'The 1993 Resolutions'). These resolutions are as follows:

1. The Conference, affirming the joy of human sexuality as God's gift and the place of every human being within the grace of God, recognises the responsibility that flows from this for us all. It therefore welcomes the serious, prayerful and sometimes costly consideration given to this issue by The Methodist Church.
2. All practices of sexuality, which are promiscuous, exploitative or demeaning in any way are unacceptable forms of behaviour and contradict God's purpose for us all.
3. A person shall not be debarred from church on the grounds of sexual orientation in itself.
4. The Conference reaffirms the traditional teaching of the Church on human sexuality; namely chastity (not celibacy) for all outside marriage and fidelity within it. The Conference directs that this affirmation is made clear to all candidates for ministry, office and membership, and having established this, affirm that the existing procedures of our church are adequate to deal with all such cases.
5. The Conference resolves that its decision in this debate shall not be used to form the basis of a disciplinary charge against any person in relation to conduct alleged to have taken place before such decisions were made.
6. Conference recognises, affirms and celebrates the participation and ministry of lesbians and gay men in the church. Conference calls on the Methodist people to begin a pilgrimage of faith to combat repression and discrimination, to work for justice and human rights and to give dignity and worth to people whatever their sexuality.

=== United Methodist Church ===
On May 7, 2018, the Bishops in the United Methodist Church, a denomination long divided on questions of LGBT equality, have proposed allowing individual pastors and regional church bodies to decide whether to ordain LGBT clergy and perform same-sex weddings. However, this proposal has not been formally approved yet and will be decided between February 23–26, 2019. After voting (February 2019), this proposal was rejected in favor of a "traditional plan" which rejects gay marriage.

The United Methodist Church (UMC) has a General Conference every four years to make decisions and when a decision is made, they add it to the Book of Discipline. From the 2016 Book of Discipline, the United Methodist Church Website cites multiple decisions on homosexuality. On the basis of membership, all persons are eligible to "attend its worship services, participate in its programs, receive the sacraments, upon baptism be admitted as baptized members, and upon taking vows declaring the Christian faith, become professing members in any local church in the connection".

Regarding the ministry of the ordained, the practice of homosexuality is seen as incompatible with Christian teaching. Thus self-identifying homosexuals are not "to be certified as candidates, ordained as ministers, or appointed to serve in The United Methodist Church". Also, "ceremonies that celebrate homosexual unions are not to be conducted by our ministers nor in our churches". On the basis of funds, the UMC does not want any of their ministries' funds used or allocated to LGBTQ+ groups or organizations. Although UMC does not want the funds to be used to condemn any such organizations either.

On 15 July 2016, Reverend Karen Oliveto became the first openly gay United Methodist Bishop after several annual conferences passed resolutions not to conform with any LGBT discriminatory church laws. UMC Bishops are elected for life. Oliveto is married to Robin Ridenour, who is a deaconess in UMC. In November 2022, gay bishop Cedrick Bridgeforth was elected.

On May 1, 2024 the UMC allowed same-sex weddings and struck down the 40 year ban on gay clergy.

In July, 2024, the lesbian married bishop Kristin Stoneking was elected.

=== Global Methodist Church ===
The Global Methodist Church formed out of schism and disaffiliation from the United Methodist Church over disputes about human sexuality. The Global Methodist Church is against same-sex marriage. Being in a same-sex relationship is a chargeable offense for clergy in the GMC.

=== Uniting Church in Australia ===
In July 2018, the Uniting Church in Australia voted by national Assembly to approve the creation of official marriage rites for same-sex couples.

== Metropolitan Community Church ==
The Metropolitan Community Church is an international fellowship of Christian congregations. Acceptance of homosexuality is an important part of its theology and the church has performed same sex marriage ceremonies since 1968.

The Metropolitan Community Church was instrumental in the first legal challenges to the heterosexual legal definition of marriage in Ontario (see Same-sex marriage in Ontario). Two couples used an old legal procedure called reading the banns to marry without a licence. When same-sex marriage was legalized in Ontario, their marriages were recognized.

== Moravian Church ==
The Moravian Church declared in 1974 that gays and lesbians were full members of the Christian community. In 2002, the Northern Provincial Synod placed a moratorium for the time being on further decisions about homosexuality. During the 2014 Northern Province Synod, they voted to permit the ordination of gay and lesbian individuals and create a ritual for solemnizing gay relationships in North America. In 2018, the Southern Province Synod permitted same-sex clergy to marry their same-sex partners. Currently, the questions of marriage and ordination are unresolved in the other provinces in the Moravian Church.

== New Apostolic Church ==
The New Apostolic Church does not approve of homosexual acts:

On the grounds of Biblical tenets and Christian tradition, the New Apostolic Church does not approve of practised homosexuality. It is solely for God to determine whether, and to what extent, a person who is absolutely confirmed in his or her homosexual disposition acquires guilt before God through the practice of his or her homosexuality. In this regard, it should be expressly stated that sexual disposition has no relevance in the pastoral care of our brothers and sisters. Brothers and sisters who are practicing homosexuals, or living in a homosexual partnership, cannot carry out ministerial and teaching duties in our Church.

== Oriental Orthodox Churches ==
Oriental Orthodoxy is a communion of six independent churches. They teach that same-sex sexual activity is sinful, and does not support any form of same-sex unions.

== Pentecostalism ==
Most churches in the Pentecostal Movement view homosexual behavior as a sin. The largest Pentecostal Church in the U.S., the Assemblies of God, makes its view clear on homosexuality in a position paper stating: "...there is absolutely no affirmation of homosexual behavior found anywhere in Scripture. Rather, the consistent sexual ideal is chastity for those outside a monogamous heterosexual marriage and fidelity for those inside such a marriage. There is also abundant evidence that homosexual behavior, along with illicit heterosexual behavior, is immoral and comes under the judgment of God." The largest Oneness Pentecostal organization, the United Pentecostal Church International, is "absolutely opposed to homosexuality."

The Indian Pentecostal Church of God the largest Pentecostal denomination in India has made its position clear that according to the 66 books of the Holy Bible, marriage must be between husband and wife and there must be no sexual union outside of marriage.

The Church of God (Cleveland, Tennessee) similarly condemns homosexuality. These churches therefore oppose same-sex unions, gay pastors, and would tend to forbid congregants who persist in homosexual practices. Politically, they are likely to support politicians with the same viewpoints. Assemblies of God churches insist that those who engage in homosexual activity should cease such behavior, as with any sin. The Church of God In Christ has taken similar positions which condemn homosexuality and same sex marriage.

Additionally, the bylaws of the International Church of the Foursquare Gospel affirm that "marriage is a biblical covenant relationship between a man and a woman established initially by God."

There are, however, a minority of LGBT affirming Pentecostal churches, both denominations and independent churches. These include the Anointed Affirming Independent Ministries, The Anthem Church was birthed out of the Pentecostal Movement, and merged into an Inter Denominational Fellowship with members from the Evangelical Lutheran Church in America, Catholic Church, Episcopalian, APCI/GAAAP, Affirming Pentecostal Church International, the LDS Church, the Covenant Network, the Global Alliance of Affirming Apostolic Pentecostals (GAAAP), and the Fellowship of Reconciling Pentecostals International (RPI). Some Pentecostal churches that are gay-affirming base their position on research done into scripture in the original languages, where they believe they find no condemnation of homosexuality.

== Presbyterianism ==
The Presbyterian Church (USA) is currently the only Presbyterian denomination in the United States that allows same-sex marriage, and ordains self-affirmed LGBT members in committed relationships as teaching elders (clergy), and ruling elders (elders elected to serve on the Session).

On Marriage: In 2014, the Presbyterian Church (USA) voted to change its definition of marriage, allowing its pastors to officiate same-sex marriages wherever gay marriage is legal. In addition, by a vote of 429–175, leaders of the 1.76 million-member Church voted during the biennial General Assembly in Detroit to change the denomination's Book of Order to describe marriage as being between "two people." A vote of the individual presbyteries began immediately after the 2014 General Assembly approval and was completed in 2015.

On Ordination: The PC(USA) approved the ordination of non-celibate gays on 8 July 2010, when, by a vote of 373 to 323, the General Assembly voted to propose to the presbyteries a constitutional amendment to remove the restriction against the ordination of partnered homosexuals. This action required ratification by a majority of the 173 presbyteries within 12 months for the proposed amendment to take effect. On 10 May 2011, a majority of the presbyteries voted to approve the constitutional change. It took effect on 10 July 2011. Until this vote, denominational policy prohibited non-celibate same-sex relations (as well as non-celibate heterosexual relations outside of marriage) for those serving as ministers or as elders on key church boards. After rancorous debate, that policy was upheld in a vote of presbyteries in 2002, but overruled in 2010. The denomination commissioned a study on the "peace, unity, and purity" of the church which found that homosexuality was not, in and of itself, a stumbling block to ordination. The report also suggested that Presbyteries and local governing bodies be the place where case-by-case decisions be made on the "readiness" of homosexual candidates for ministry. In 2008 the General Assembly sent to the presbyteries a vote to remove the wording from the constitution of the denomination that is seen as barring homosexuals from ordination (G-6.106b). The 2008 General Assembly also removed all precedent-setting cases and "authoritative interpretations" concerning homosexuality since 1978 which were seen by full-inclusion advocates as being stumbling blocks to ordination of homosexual individuals.

Other, smaller American Presbyterian bodies, such as the Presbyterian Church in America, the Evangelical Presbyterian Church, the Associate Reformed Presbyterian Church, the Orthodox Presbyterian Church, and the Communion of Reformed Evangelical Churches condemn same-sex sexual behavior as incompatible with Biblical morality, but believe gays and lesbians can repent and abandon the lifestyle.

Many Presbyterians in New Zealand are active in the Association for Reconciling Christians and Congregations, an ecumenical group that supports the full inclusion and participation of all people in the Church, including gay and lesbian persons.

In America, More Light Presbyterians, a coalition of gay-inclusive congregations, was founded in 1980. Today the organization has 194 member churches, while many more informally endorse its mission to more fully welcome people of all sexualities into the life of the church.

== Quakerism ==
Quakers in many countries, such as Australia, Canada, New Zealand and the United Kingdom, are supportive of gay, lesbian, bisexual and transgender people, seeing this as necessary aspect of the Equality Testimony and part of historical Quaker activism against injustice and oppression. Quakers in these countries have become active in the fight for equality of marriage for same-sex couples, and perform same-sex commitment or marriage ceremonies as part of Quaker business.

In 2009, several Quaker meetings including the Twin Cities Friends Meeting (St. Paul and Minneapolis) announced they would stop signing certificates for opposite-sex marriages until same-sex marriages were fully legalized. Conservative Friends have differing theological stances on homosexuality. Ohio Yearly Meeting of Conservative Friends defines marriage as between one man and one woman; it does not sanction same-sex unions, or accept sexual relationships outside of marriage. The other two Conservative yearly meetings do accept same-sex marriage.

The majority (52%) of Quakers live in Africa. They do not usually accept homosexuality; for example, Friends Church in Kenya "condemns homosexuality"

== Roman Catholic Church ==
Homosexuality is considered in the Roman Catholic Church teaching under two distinct aspects: homosexuality as an orientation and homosexual sexual activity.

Homosexuality as an orientation is not considered sinful, though is referred to, in highly technical language, as an "objective disorder" as it is seen as "ordered toward an intrinsic moral evil". The term 'disorder' is used several times throughout The Catechism of the Catholic Church to reference sin in general—e.g. venial sin, sin within marriage, the disorder of divorce, etc. All sin creates a disordering of the direction and proper ordering of nature.

The Church therefore recognizes that homosexuality is an innate condition in most cases, not a choice, and cannot be considered a sin. Homosexual sexual activity, however, is seen as a "moral disorder" and "homosexual acts" as "contrary to the natural law". The same acts would be considered equally 'contrary to the natural law' if performed by heterosexual couples. "They close the sexual act to the gift of life. They do not proceed from a genuine effective and sexual complementary."

The Roman Catholic Church believes that marriage is only between one man and one woman, and opposes same-sex marriage at both the religious and civil levels. The Church also holds that same-sex unions are an unfavorable environment for children and that the legalization of such unions damages society.

From the Catechism of the Catholic Church 2396: "Among the sins gravely contrary to chastity are masturbation, fornication, pornography, and homosexual practices."

In the film Francesco from 2020, Pope Francis supported in an interview some legal framework for homosexuals, to guarantee rights such as hospital visitation and inheritance, stating that "that way they are legally covered. I stood up for that." He further stated that families should not expel teenage children from home if they display a homosexual orientation, saying "they [still] have a right to a family."

In his 25 September 2023 response to conservative cardinals' written dubia before the World Synod of Bishops, Pope Francis signaled the Church's openness to blessings for gay couples as long as they did not misrepresent the Church's view of marriage as between one man and one woman.

On 18 December 2023, Pope Francis approved Fiducia supplicans which allow priests to give blessings to same-sex couples, as long as they do not "resemble marriage". The formal announcement reiterates that marriage is between a man and a woman and that a same-sex union should not be conferred and blessed at the same time.

In April 2025, Roman Catholic Bishop Conference in Germany published a guidelinehelp document of blessing ceremonies for same-sex couples.

== Independent Catholic Denominations ==
There are a number of catholic denominations that claim an apostolic succession but have split from the historic Roman Catholic Church. Acceptance of homosexuality varies between these groups but there are a few that fully support LGBT inclusion. Some of these groups are the American Apostolic Old Catholic Church, American Catholic Church in the United States, American National Catholic Church, Catholic Apostolic Church in North America, Christ Communion, Ecumenical Catholic Communion, Ecumenical Catholic Church, Evangelical Catholic Church, Independent Catholic Christian Church, Liberal Catholic Church, Orthodox-Catholic Church of America, Reformed Catholic Church, The National Catholic Church of America, and United Catholic Church.

== Swedenborgianism ==
The largest Swedenborgian denomination in North America, the General Church of the New Jerusalem, does not ordain gay and lesbian ministers, but the oldest denomination, the Swedenborgian Church of North America, does.

The Lord's New Church Which Is Nova Hierosolyma has no official doctrine on the debate of homosexuality. Personal opinions vary, but respecting others and not condemning anyone is an important facet of the Lord's New Church: "Human freedom is necessary if men are to be led in freedom according to reason by the Lord into the life in the Lord which is freedom itself." So the Church values the "expression of the thoughts and feelings of all in the Church provided they are not in opposition to the Essentials and the Principles of Doctrine of the Church"

== United Church of Canada ==
The United Church of Canada, the largest Protestant denomination in Canada, affirms that gay and lesbian persons are welcome in the church and the ministry. The resolution "A) That all persons, regardless of their sexual orientation, who profess Jesus Christ and obedience to Him, are welcome to be or become full member of the Church. B) All members of the Church are eligible to be considered for the Ordered Ministry." was passed in 1988. This was not done, however, without intense debate over what was termed "the issue"; some congregations chose to leave the church rather than support the resolution. In August 2012, the governing body of the church, General Council - which gathers trianually to determine the leadership and direction of the church - selected Rev. Gary Paterson to be its moderator. He is believed to be the first openly gay leader of any mainline Christian denomination anywhere in the world.

The church campaigned starting in 1977 to have the federal government add sexual orientation to federal non-discrimination laws, which was accomplished in 1996. The church has also engaged in activism in favour of the legalization of same-sex marriage in Canada, and on 20 July 2005, Canada became the fourth country in the world and the first country in the Americas and the first country outside Europe to legalize same-sex marriage nationwide with the enactment of the Civil Marriage Act. In 2012, Gary Paterson became first open gay moderator of United Church of Canada.

== United Church of Christ ==
The United Church of Christ (UCC) was formed by the General Council of Congregational Christian Churches and the Evangelical and Reformed Church. Its polity is such that the views of one setting of the church cannot be unwillingly 'forced' on another church setting, whether between congregations of local churches, or between the upper levels of the church and individual congregations. Each individual church is independent and autonomous, in effect ecclesiastically sovereign. Thus, views on many controversial matters can and do vary among congregations. David Roozen, director of the Hartford Institute for Religion Research who has studied the United Church of Christ, said surveys show the national church's pronouncements are often more liberal than the views in the pews but that its governing structure is set up to allow such disagreements.

The United Church of Christ General Synod in 1985 passed a resolution entitled "Calling on United Church of Christ Congregations to Declare Themselves Open and Affirming" saying that "the Fifteenth General Synod of the United Church of Christ encourages a policy of non-discrimination in employment, volunteer service and membership policies with regard to sexual orientation; encourages associations, Conferences and all related organizations to adopt a similar policy; and encourages the congregations of the United Church of Christ to adopt a non-discrimination policy and a Covenant of Openness and Affirmation of persons of lesbian, gay and bisexual orientation within the community of faith". General Synod XIV in 2003 officially added transgender persons to this declaration of full inclusion in the life and leadership of the Church.

In July 2005, the 25th General Synod encouraged congregations to affirm "equal marriage rights for all", and to consider "wedding policies that do not discriminate based on the gender of the couple." The resolution also encouraged congregations to support legislation permitting civil same-sex marriage rights. By the nature of United Church of Christ polity, General Synod resolutions officially speak "to, but not for" the other settings of the denomination (local congregations, associations, conferences, and the national offices). This Synod also expressed respect for those bodies within the church that disagree and called for all members "to engage in serious, respectful, and prayerful discussion of the covenantal relationship of marriage and equal marriage rights for couples regardless of gender."

Some associations permit ordination of non-celibate gay clergy and some clergy and congregations are willing to perform or allow same-sex marriages or union services. Approximately 10% of UCC congregations have adopted an official "open and affirming" statement welcoming gay and lesbian persons in all aspects of church life. A few congregations explicitly oppose the General Synod Equal Marriage Rights resolution – an independent movement called "Faithful and Welcoming Churches(FWC)" that partly defines faithful as "Faithful... to the preservation of the family, and to the practice and proclamation of human sexuality as God's gift for marriage between a man and a woman." Many congregations have no official stance; these congregations' de facto stances vary widely in their degree of welcome toward gay and lesbian persons.

The United Church of Christ Coalition for Lesbian, Gay, Bisexual, and Transgender Concerns is one of the officially recognized "Historically Underrepresented Groups" in the United Church of Christ, and as such has a dedicated seat on the United Church of Christ Executive Council and a number of other boards. The Biblical Witness Fellowship, a notable conservative renewal organization within the UCC, formed in the 1970s in response to general synods opinions on the sexuality issue and has argued that there "has been a deliberate and forceful attempt within the mainline church to overthrow Biblical revelation [about] ... what it means to be human particularly in the Biblical revelation of a humanity reflective of God and sexually created for [heterosexual] marriage and family."

== Uniting Church in Australia ==
The Uniting Church in Australia allows for the membership and ordination of gay and lesbian people and permits local presbyteries to ordain gay and lesbian ministers, and extends the local option to marriage; a minister may bless a same-sex marriage. In July 2018, the Uniting Church in Australia voted by national Assembly to approve the creation of official marriage rites for same-sex couples.

The role of gay and lesbian people in the church, their possibility of being ordained and the blessing of same-sex unions have been issues debated throughout the Uniting Church's history. The fairly broad consensus has been that a person's sexual orientation should not be a bar to attendance, membership or participation in the church. More controversial has been the issue of sexual activity by gay and lesbian people and the sexual behaviour of ordination candidates. In 2003, the church voted to allow local presbyteries to decide whether to ordain gay and lesbian people as ministers. Ministers were permitted to bless same-sex couples entering civil unions even before same-sex marriage was legalized in Australia in late 2017. In July 2018, the national assembly approved the creation of marriage rites for same-sex couples.

Since 1997, some ministers living in same-sex relationships have come out without their ordination (or ministry) being challenged. In 2011, the church approved the blessing of same-sex unions. Seven years later it allowed local congregations and ministers to decide whether to perform same-sex marriages, and ministers may now do so.

== United Reformed Church ==
A detailed report was submitted to the 2007 General Assembly of the United Reformed Church exploring its position on homosexuality. In 2011, The United Reformed Church in United Kingdom allowed the blessing of same-sex unions. On 9 July 2016 the church formally voted by 240 votes to 21 in favour of allowing any local church to offer same-sex marriages, if it chooses to obtain a licence.

== Swiss Reformed Church ==
In August 2019, the blessing of same-sex marriages is allowed in Swiss Reformed Church.

== Vineyard Churches, USA ==
The United States branch of the Association of Vineyard Churches issued a statement on LGBT issues in 2014. The statement "affirms marriage as a covenantal union between a man and a woman" and states "that outside of the boundaries of marriage, the Bible calls for abstinence." At the same time, the statement expresses repentance for "sinful stigmatization" of homosexual persons and encourages the expression of grace and compassion towards all who are tempted by extramarital sex.

== Unity Church ==
Unity Church issued a Statement of Diversity in 1995 which stated in part: "We strive for our ministries, publications and programs to reach out to all who seek Unity support and spiritual growth. It is imperative that our ministries and outreaches be free of discrimination on the basis of race, color, gender, age, creed, religion, national origin, ethnicity, physical disability or sexual orientation. Our sincere desire is to ensure that all Unity organizations are nondiscriminatory and support diversity." Unity has stated on their website that: "Unity proudly supports the LGBTQIA+ community. We believe everyone is divine and that every person shines with the light of God!"

While Unity does not impose formal requirements on individual Unity churches to perform same-sex marriages, many Unity churches do perform same-sex marriages. Unity performs same-sex marriages at their world headquarters in Unity Village, Missouri.

Unity allows LGBTQ people to become ministers and licensed Unity teachers.

== Philippine Independent Church ==
Officially known as the Iglesia Filipina Independiente and colloquially called the Aglipayan Church, an Independent Catholic denomination with Anglo-Catholic orientation, the church has adopted an official and binding position of inclusion and full acceptance of LGBT individuals and organizations since 2017 after the question of inclusiveness was raised in an official leadership meeting by a gay member of the church in 2014. Its youth organization wing has also repeatedly elected presidents, vice presidents, and executives who belong to the Filipino LGBT youth sector. On February 24, 2023, the church ordained Wylard "Wowa" Ledama, a trans woman, to the diaconate as the church's first trans clergy.

== Summary of denominational positions in North America, Europe, and Asia ==
The following table summarizes various denominational practices concerning members who are currently in a homosexual relationship. See also: Blessing of same-sex unions in Christian churches.

Denomination	Allows homosexuals as members	Ordains homosexuals	Blesses unions	Marries
Adventist	No	No	No	No
Alliance of Baptists	Yes	Yes	Yes	Yes
Anglican Church in North America	No	No	No	No
American Baptist Churches USA	Varies	No	No (official denominational position; local congregational practices may differ)	No (official denominational position; local congregational practices may differ)
Assemblies of God	No	No	No	No
National Baptist Convention	Varies	No	Varies	Varies
Southern Baptist Convention	No	No	No	No
Catholic Church	Yes (Catechism considers homosexual acts to be sinful, but states that homosexuals must be treated with respect, compassion and sensitivity.)	Yes	Varies (Strictly speaking, no. Priests are allowed to bless individuals but not the union itself. Regardless, there are still priests and episcopal conferences who consider this as an affirming stance).	No
Christian Church (Disciples of Christ)	Yes (General Assembly has affirmed all orientations; local regions and congregations can make their own choice)	Yes (General Assembly has affirmed all orientations; local regions and congregations can make their own choice)	Varies	Varies (General Assembly does not have a stated a position on same-sex marriage; local regions and congregations may perform)
Christian Reformed Church in North America	No	No	No	No
Church of the East	No	No	No	No
Reformed Church in America	Yes	Varies	Varies	Varies (decided within classes)
Churches of Christ	No	No	No	No
Church of God (Anderson, Indiana)	Yes	No	No	No
Indian Pentecostal Church of God	No	No	No	No
Church of the Nazarene	No	No	No	No
Church of England	Yes	No	Yes	No
Church of Scotland	Yes	Yes	Varies	Yes
Eastern Orthodox	No (Weaning from the sacrament for 15 years. In case of termination and repentance for 3 years.)	No.	No	No
Episcopal	Yes	Yes (All dioceses ordain candidates regardless of orientation. A minority of bishops require celibacy; others have shown an expectation that homosexual clergy should take advantage of what legal and ecclesiastical recognition is available for their unions).	Yes	Yes
The Church of Jesus Christ of Latter-day Saints (Mormons)	Yes (Homosexual behavior is considered sinful and may be subject to church discipline short of excommunication)	No	No	No
Community of Christ	Yes	Varies. In nations where it is illegal, even punishable by death, homosexuals will not be ordained into the priesthood	Varies (In nations where it is illegal, even punishable by death, same-sex unions of any kind will not be blessed)	Varies (In nations where it is illegal, even punishable by death, same-sex marriages will not be performed)
Evangelical Covenant Church	No	No	No	No
Evangelical Free Church of America	No	No	No	No
Evangelical Lutheran Church in America	Yes	Yes	Varies (by discernment of congregation and pastor)	Varies (in civil jurisdictions where allowable and by discernment of congregation and pastor)
Lutheran Church–Missouri Synod	No	No	No	No
Evangelical Lutheran Church in Canada	Yes	Yes	Yes	Yes
German Lutheran and United Churches in Evangelical Church in Germany	Yes	Yes	Yes	Varies
Mennonite	Varies	Varies	Varies	Varies
United Methodist Church	Yes	Yes	Yes	Yes
Metropolitan Community Church	Yes	Yes	Yes	Yes
United Pentecostal Church International	No	No	No	No
Evangelical Presbyterian Church	No	No	No	No
Orthodox Presbyterian Church	No	No	No	No
Oriental Orthodox Church	No	No	No	No
Presbyterian Church (USA)	Yes	Yes	Varies	Yes
Presbyterian Church in America	No	No	No	No
Religious Society of Friends (Quaker)	Yes	Varies	Varies	Varies
Union of Scranton (Old Catholic)	No	No	No	No
Union of Methodist and Waldensian Churches (Italy)	Yes	Yes	Yes	No
Union of Utrecht of the Old Catholic Churches	Yes	Yes	Yes	No
Swedenborgian	Yes	Varies	Varies	Varies
Church of Sweden	Yes	Yes	Yes	Yes
Church of Denmark	Yes	Yes	Yes	Yes
Church of Iceland	Yes	Yes	Yes	Yes
Church of Norway	Yes	Yes	Yes	Yes
Evangelical Lutheran Church of Finland	Yes	Yes	Yes	Yes
Unification Church	No	No	No	No
Unitarian and Free Christian Churches (Note: Unitarian Universalism is not a Christian religion) (UK)	Yes	Yes	Yes	Yes
United Church of Canada	Yes	Yes	Not applicable	Varies
United Church of Christ	Yes	Yes	Yes	Yes
Vineyard USA	No	No	No	No
The Wesleyan Church	No	No	No	No
Rosicrucian Fellowship (Esoteric Christians)	Undefined (homosexual activity is considered sinful; members are expected to eventually abstain from any sexual practice other than for procreation, performed as a sacramental act)	No (the Fellowship does not ordain; however, access to Discipleship requires Generative Purity)	No	No (marriage is seen as a sacrament binding man and woman; the marriage service requires the presence of an ordained Minister of a Christian church)
Unity Church	Yes	Yes	Varies	Varies
Philippine Independent Church (Iglesia Filipina Independiente)	Yes	Yes	No	No

== See also ==
- Blessing of same-sex unions in Christian churches
- Gay bishops
- Homosexuality and Christianity
- Homosexuality and religion
- LGBT-affirming religious groups
- Marriage privatization
- Ordination of LGBT Christian clergy
- Status of same-sex marriage
