= List of Christian denominations affirming LGBTQ people =

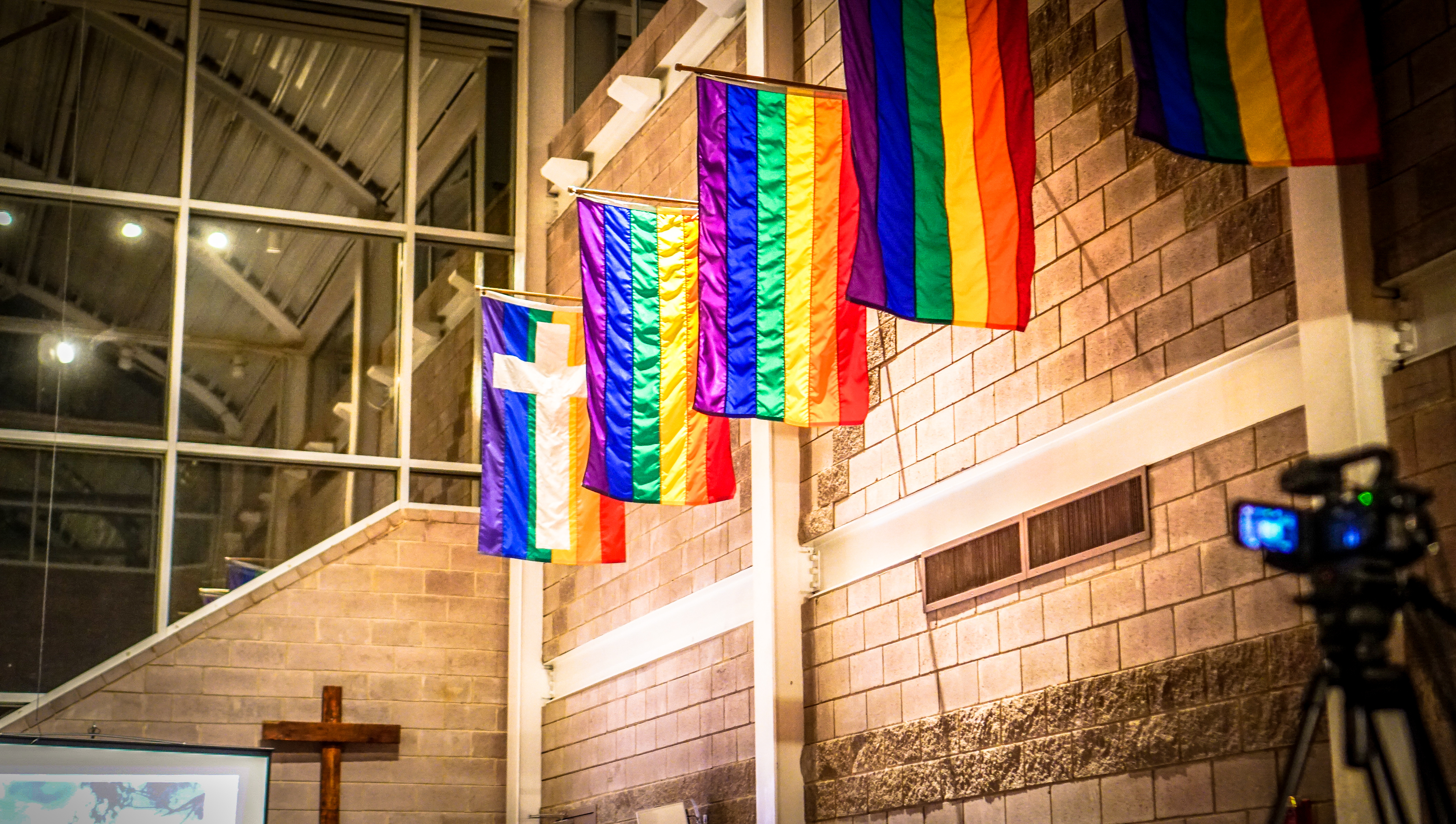
Christian LGBTQ pride flag with cross hanging in a Metropolitan Community Church

The list of Christian denominations affirming LGBTQ people lists denominations that affirm same-sex relationships are theologically and morally compatible with the Christian faith, or that leave it up to each local church to determine its position on the subject. These denominations may have statements that support the ordination of LGBTQ ministers, the blessing of same-sex unions or same-sex marriage.

These statements often follow the courts' recognition of LGBTQ+ rights and are primarily adopted at the local church level.

== History ==
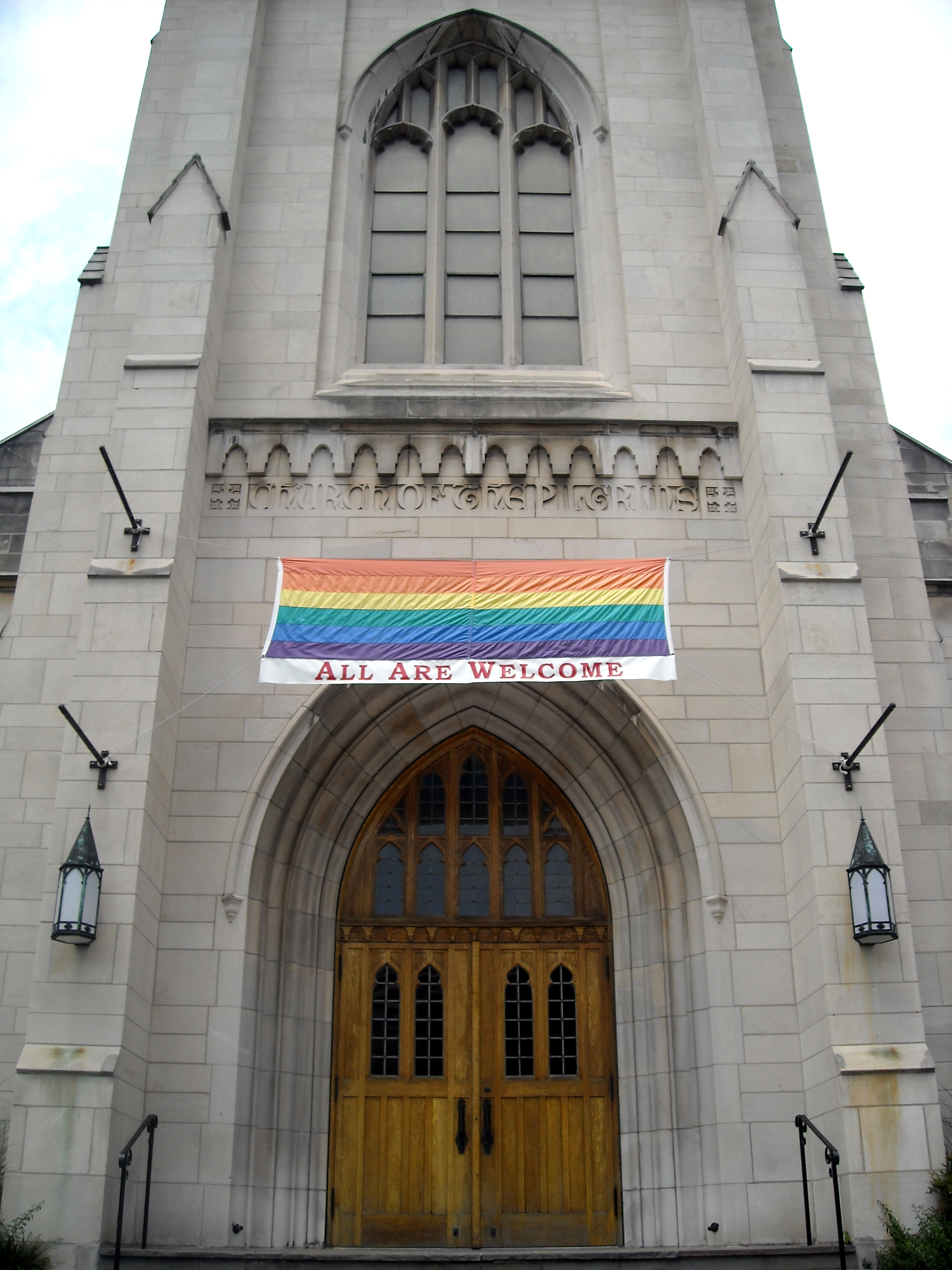
Church of the Pilgrims in Washington, D.C., US, with a banner affirming its welcome for everyone

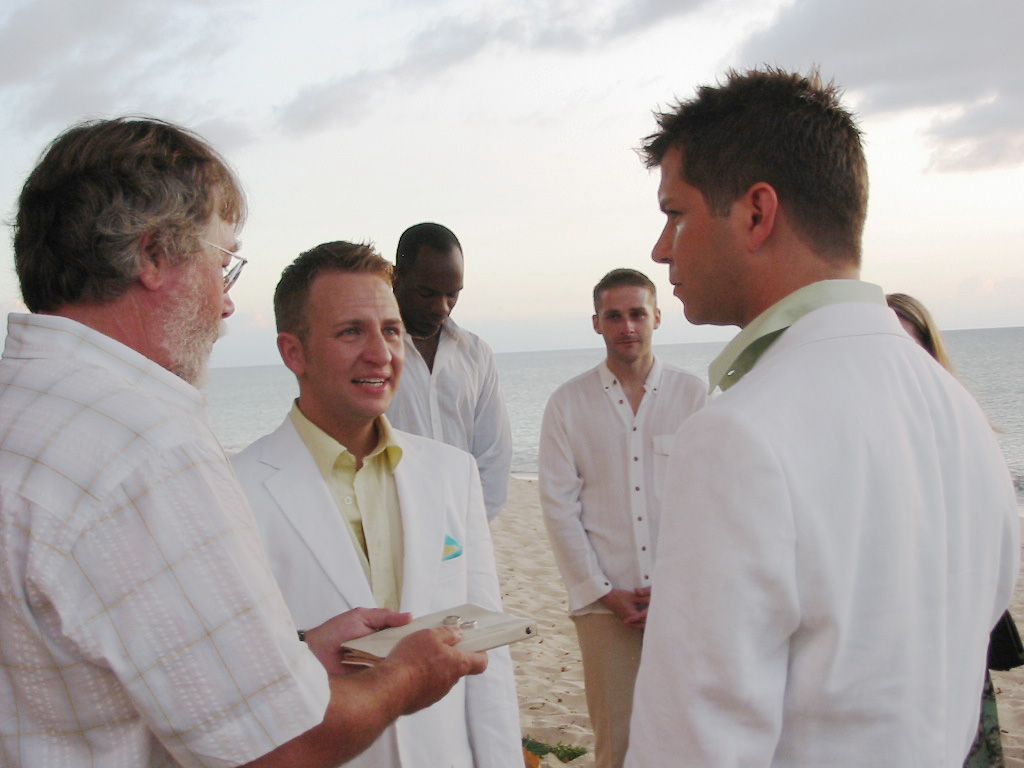
Marriage of two men celebrated by a Christian pastor in the United States

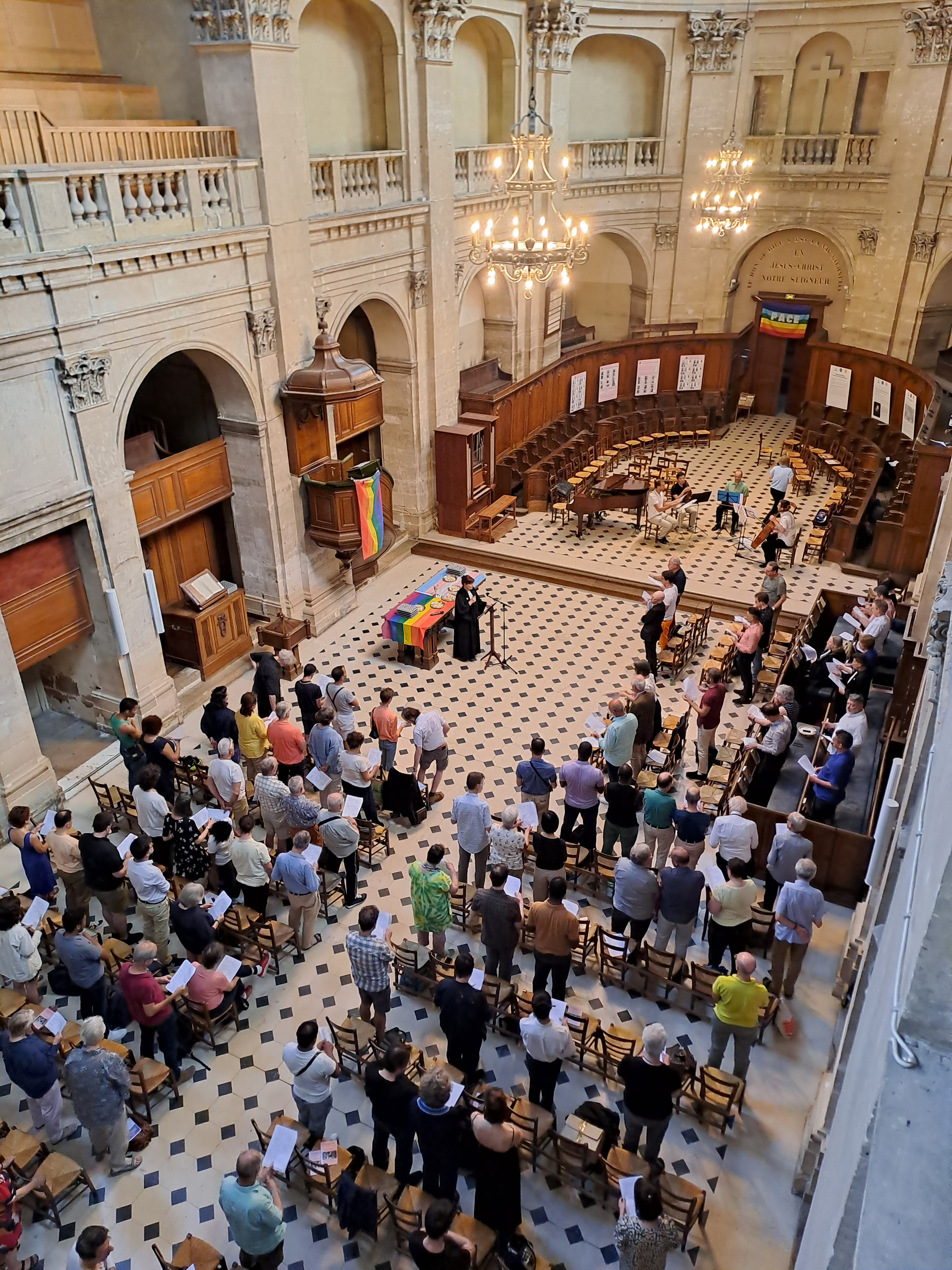
Inclusive ecumenical vigil at the Protestant church of the Oratoire du Louvre, before the Paris Pride.

On May 1, 1972, the United Church of Christ in the San Francisco Bay Area approved the ordination of William R. Johnson, an openly gay seminarian. He was ordained as a pastor at the Community Church San Carlos (United Church of Christ) on June 25, 1972. In 1974, with the help of San Francisco State University professor Sally Miller Gearhart, he published the book Loving Women/Loving Men: Gay Liberation and the Church, which argues, among other things, that marriage is a covenant relationship, regardless of gender.

In the context of the gay liberation movement and the declassification of homosexuality as a disease by the American Psychiatric Association in 1973, these studies prompted various Progressive Christians churches and denominations to abandon discriminatory interpretations for LGBTQ people and offer equal recognition within their churches. In some denominations, this recognition has come through the development of affirming networks of churches, universities and seminaries. These include American Baptists Concerned for Sexual Minorities in 1972 (replaced by the Association of Welcoming and Affirming Baptists in 1993) by members of the American Baptist Churches USA, UCC Coalition for Lesbian/Gay Concerns in 1972 (renamed Open and Affirming Coalition UCC in 2014) by members of the United Church of Christ, Lutherans Concerned for Gay People in 1974 (renamed ReconcilingWorks in 2012) by members of the Evangelical Lutheran Church in America, Presbyterians for Gay Concerns in 1974 and More Light Churches Network in 1992 (merged and renamed More Light Presbyterians in 1999) by members of the Presbyterian Church (USA), Affirmation: United Methodists for Lesbian/Gay Concerns in 1975 and Reconciling Ministries Network in 1984 by members of the United Methodist Church, Brethren Mennonite Council for LGBT Interests and Supportive Communities Network in 1976 by members of the Mennonite Church USA. Some of these networks have become international, such as the Association of Welcoming and Affirming Baptists and Reconciling Ministries Network.

The European Forum of LGBT+ Christian Groups was founded in 1982 by various national associations. In 2025, it had 40 member associations in 20 countries.

According to the book Same-Sex Unions in Pre-Modern Europe, published in 1994 by the American historian John Boswell, despite the lack of legal recognition, the ritual of adelphopoiia celebrated by the Catholic Church until the 14th century and by the Eastern Orthodox Church until the early 20th century, could be considered a blessing of same-sex unions.

In the context of the legalization of same-sex marriage in various US states and countries during the 2000s, conceptual research into the meaning of marriage commitment in biblical texts prompted various churches to consider that the basis of Christian marriage and sexuality is to remain faithful in a covenant with one's spouse, regardless of gender. After national reflection, some Progressive Christian denominations then began to allow the blessing or same-sex marriage, usually leaving it to each local church to decide.

In 2020 and 2025, the European Forum of LGBT Christian Groups in collaboration with the Protestant Theological University of Amsterdam published the Rainbow Index of Churches in Europe to measure the level of inclusion in Christian denominations.

== Characteristics ==
Affirming denominations generally have one or more of the following statements about LGBTQ people, or leave it up to each local church to determine its position on the subject:

1. Ordination of LGBTQ ministers
2. Blessing of same-sex unions
3. Blessing of same-sex marriages

These statements often follow the courts' recognition of LGBTQ+ rights and are primarily adopted at the local church level.

In English, the term "inclusive" is sometimes used for organizations that allow differing positions on the subject to coexist.

== International ==
Countries	Denomination	Ordination of LGBTQ ministers	Blessing of same-sex unions	Blessings of same-sex marriage	Decisions left to local churches or dioceses	Network of Inclusive Churches
5 countries	Association of Welcoming and Affirming Baptists	Yes Since 1993	Yes Since 1993	Yes	No	Yes Since 1993
4 countries	Ecumenical Catholic Communion (Independent Catholicism)	Yes	Yes	Yes	No	Yes Since 2003
4 countries	Ecumenical Catholic Church (Independent Catholicism)	Yes	Yes	Yes	No	Yes Since 1987
20 countries	Metropolitan Community Church	Yes Since 1968	Yes Since 1969	Yes Since 1969	No	Yes Since 1968
5 countries	Reconciling Ministries Network (United Methodist Church)	Yes Since 2024	Yes Since 2024	Yes Since 2024	No	Yes Since 1984
4 countries	Covenant Network (Pentecostal)	Yes	Yes	Yes	No	Yes Since 2014

== Africa ==
Country	Denomination	Ordination of LGBTQ ministers	Blessing of same-sex unions	Blessings of same-sex marriage	Decisions left to local churches or dioceses	Network of Inclusive Churches
Kenya	Association of Welcoming and Affirming Baptists	Yes Since 1993	Yes Since 1993	Yes	No	Yes
Kenya	Ecumenical Catholic Church	Yes	Yes	Yes	No	Yes
Kenya	Metropolitan Community Church	Yes Since 1968	Yes Since 1969	Yes Since 1969	No	Yes
Kenya	Reconciling Ministries Network	Yes Since 2024	Yes Since 2024	Yes Since 2024	No	Yes
Uganda	Metropolitan Community Church	Yes Since 1968	Yes Since 1969	Yes Since 1969	No	Yes
South Africa	Metropolitan Community Church	Yes Since 1968	Yes Since 1969	Yes Since 1969	No	Yes
South Africa	Methodist Church of Southern Africa	Yes Since 2020	No	No	Yes	No
South Africa	Uniting Reformed Church in Southern Africa	Yes Since 2018	Yes Since 2018	Yes Since 2018	Yes	No
South Africa	Dutch Reformed Church in South Africa (NGK)	Yes Since 2019	Yes Since 2019	Yes Since 2019	Yes	No
South Africa	Uniting Presbyterian Church in Southern Africa	Yes Since 2015	Yes Since 2015	Yes Since 2015	Yes	No
South Africa	Deo Gloria Global Apostolic Network in South Africa	Yes	Yes	Yes	No	Yes

== North America ==
Country	Denomination	Ordination of LGBTQ ministers	Blessing of same-sex unions	Blessings of same-sex marriage	Decisions left to local churches or dioceses	Network of Inclusive Churches
Canada	Association of Welcoming and Affirming Baptists	Yes Since 1993	Yes Since 1993	Yes	No	Yes
Canada	Baptist Peace Fellowship of North America	Yes Since 1995	Yes	Yes	No	Yes
Canada	Canadian Association for Baptist Freedoms	Yes	Yes	Yes	Yes	No
Canada	Evangelical Lutheran Church in Canada	Yes Since 2011	Yes Since 2011	Yes Since 2011	Yes	ReconcilingWorks : Since 1974
Canada	Community of Christ	Yes Since 2013	Yes Since 2013	Yes Since 2013	Yes	Harmony : Since 1982
Canada	Anglican Church of Canada	Yes Since 2019	Yes Since 2019	Yes Since 2019	Yes	No
Canada	Mennonite Church Canada	Yes Since 2016	Yes Since 2016	Yes Since 2016	Yes	In This Together Network : Since 2019
Canada	Presbyterian Church in Canada	Yes Since 2021	Yes Since 2021	Yes Since 2021	Yes	No
Canada	United Church of Canada	Yes Since 1988	Yes Since 2000	Yes	Yes	Affirm United/S'affirmer Ensemble : Since 1982
United States	Affirming Christian Fellowship	Yes	Yes	Yes	No	Yes
United States	Alliance of Baptists	Yes	Yes	Yes Since 2004	Yes	No
United States	American Baptist Churches USA	No	Yes	Yes	Yes	No
United States	American National Catholic Church	Yes	Yes	Yes	No	Yes
United States	Association of Welcoming and Affirming Baptists	Yes Since 1993	Yes Since 1993	Yes	No	Yes
United States	Baptist Peace Fellowship of North America	Yes Since 1995	Yes	Yes	No	Yes
United States	Catholic Apostolic Church in North America	Yes	Yes	Yes	No	Yes
United States	Christian Church (Disciples of Christ)	Yes Since 2013	Yes	Yes Since 2015	Yes	Alliance Q : Since 1979
United States	Community of Christ	Yes Since 2013	Yes Since 2013	Yes Since 2013	Yes	Harmony : Since 1982
United States	Covenant Network (Pentecostal)	Yes	Yes	Yes	No	Yes
United States	Cooperative Baptist Fellowship	No	Yes	Yes	Yes	No
United States	Ecumenical Catholic Communion	Yes	Yes	Yes	No	Yes
United States	Ecumenical Catholic Church	Yes	Yes	Yes	No	Yes
United States	Episcopal Church (United States)	Yes Since 2009	Yes Since 2012	Yes Since 2018	Yes	No
United States	Evangelical Anglican Church In America	Yes	Yes	Yes	No	Yes
United States	Evangelical Lutheran Church in America	Yes Since 2009	Yes	Yes Since 2015	Yes	ReconcilingWorks : Since 1974
United States	Evangelical Catholic Church	Yes	Yes	Yes	No	Yes
United States	Fellowship of Reconciling Pentecostals International	Yes	Yes	Yes	No	Yes
United States	Friends General Conference (Quakers)	Yes Since 2004	Yes Since 2004	Yes Since 2004	Yes	No
United States	Mennonite Church USA	Yes Since 2022	Yes Since 2022	Yes Since 2022	Yes	Supportive Communities Network : Since 1976
United States	Metropolitan Community Church	Yes Since 1968	Yes Since 1969	Yes Since 1969	No	Yes
United States	Moravian Church in America	Yes Since 2014	Yes Since 2014	Yes Since 2014	Yes	No
United States	National Baptist Convention, USA	Yes	Yes	Yes	Yes	No
United States	National Association of Congregational Christian Churches	Yes	Yes	Yes	Yes	No
United States	Progressive National Baptist Convention	Yes	Yes	Yes	Yes	No
United States	Presbyterian Church (USA)	Yes Since 2011	Yes Since 2014	Yes Since 2014	Yes	More Light Presbyterians et Covenant Network of Presbyterians : Since 1974
United States	Reformed Church in America	Yes	Yes	Yes	Yes	Room for All : Since 2005
United States	Swedenborgian Church of North America	Yes	Yes	Yes	Yes	No
United States	United Church of Christ	Yes Since 1972	Yes Since 2005	Yes Since 2005	Yes	Open and Affirming Coalition UCC : Since 1972
United States	United Methodist Church	Yes Since 2024	Yes Since 2024	Yes Since 2024	Yes	Reconciling Ministries Network : Since 1984
United States	Unity Church	Yes	Yes	Yes	Yes	No
Cuba	Fellowship of Baptist Churches in Cuba	Yes	Yes	Yes	Yes	No
Cuba	Metropolitan Community Church	Yes Since 1968	Yes Since 1969	Yes Since 1969	No	Yes
Costa Rica	Anglican Church in Central America	Yes	No	No	Yes	No
Costa Rica	Ecumenical Catholic Church	Yes	Yes	Yes	No	Yes
Costa Rica	Costa Rican Lutheran Church	Yes	Yes	Yes	Yes	No
Costa Rica	Metropolitan Community Church	Yes Since 1968	Yes Since 1969	Yes Since 1969	No	Yes
El Salvador	Anglican Church in Central America	Yes	No	No	Yes	No
Mexico	Ecumenical Catholic Church	Yes	Yes	Yes	No	Yes
Mexico	Metropolitan Community Church	Yes Since 1968	Yes Since 1969	Yes Since 1969	No	Yes
Mexico	Covenant Network (Pentecostal)	Yes	Yes	Yes	No	Yes
Puerto Rico	Association of Welcoming and Affirming Baptists	Yes Since 1993	Yes Since 1993	Yes	No	Yes
Puerto Rico	Covenant Network (Pentecostal)	Yes	Yes	Yes	No	Yes
Puerto Rico	Metropolitan Community Church	Yes Since 1968	Yes Since 1969	Yes Since 1969	No	Yes
Puerto Rico	Reconciling Ministries Network	Yes Since 2024	Yes Since 2024	Yes Since 2024	No	Yes

== South America ==
Country	Denomination	Ordination of LGBTQ ministers	Blessing of same-sex unions	Blessings of same-sex marriage	Decisions left to local churches or dioceses	Network of Inclusive Churches
Argentina	Evangelical Church of the River Plate	Yes Since 2010	Yes Since 2010	Yes Since 2010	No	No
Argentina	Waldensian Evangelical Church of the River Plate	Yes Since 2010	Yes Since 2010	Yes Since 2010	Yes	No
Argentina	Evangelical Methodist Church in Argentina	Yes Since 2014	Yes Since 2014	Yes Since 2014	Yes	No
Argentina	Metropolitan Community Church	Yes Since 1968	Yes Since 1969	Yes Since 1969	No	Yes
Argentina	Reconciling Ministries Network	Yes Since 2024	Yes Since 2024	Yes Since 2024	No	Yes
Argentina	United Evangelical Lutheran Church (Argentina and Uruguay)	Yes	Yes	Yes	Yes	No
Brazil	Alliance of Baptists in Brazil	Yes Since 2011	Yes Since 2011	Yes Since 2011	Yes	No
Brazil	Anglican Episcopal Church of Brazil	Yes Since 2018	Yes Since 2018	Yes Since 2018	Yes	No
Brazil	Metropolitan Community Church	Yes Since 1968	Yes Since 1969	Yes Since 1969	No	Yes
Brazil	Reconciling Ministries Network	Yes Since 2024	Yes Since 2024	Yes Since 2024	No	Yes
Chile	Evangelical Lutheran Church in Chile	Yes	Yes	Yes	Yes	No
Colombia	Colombian Methodist Church	Yes	Yes	Yes	Yes	No
Colombia	Metropolitan Community Church	Yes Since 1968	Yes Since 1969	Yes Since 1969	No	Yes
Paraguay	Evangelical Church of the River Plate	Yes Since 2010	Yes Since 2010	Yes Since 2010	No	No
Uruguay	Evangelical Church of the River Plate	Yes Since 2010	Yes Since 2010	Yes Since 2010	No	No
Uruguay	Waldensian Evangelical Church of the River Plate	Yes Since 2010	Yes Since 2010	Yes Since 2010	Yes	No
Uruguay	Metropolitan Community Church	Yes Since 1968	Yes Since 1969	Yes Since 1969	No	Yes
Uruguay	United Evangelical Lutheran Church (Argentina and Uruguay)	Yes	Yes	Yes	Yes	No
Uruguay	Methodist Church in Uruguay	Yes	Yes	Yes	Yes	No

== Asia ==
Country	Denomination	Ordination of LGBTQ ministers	Blessing of same-sex unions	Blessings of same-sex marriage	Decisions left to local churches or dioceses	Network of Inclusive Churches
Philippines	Metropolitan Community Church	Yes Since 1968	Yes Since 1969	Yes Since 1969	No	Yes
Philippines	Philippine Independent Church	Yes Since 2017	No	No	No	No
Philippines	Reconciling Ministries Network	Yes Since 2024	Yes Since 2024	Yes Since 2024	No	Yes
Philippines	United Church of Christ in the Philippines	Yes Since 2014	No	No	No	No

== Europe ==
Country	Denomination	Ordination of LGBTQ ministers	Blessing of same-sex unions	Blessings of same-sex marriage	Decisions left to local churches or dioceses	Network of Inclusive Churches
Austria	Evangelical Church of the Augsburg Confession in Austria	Yes Since 2019	Yes Since 2019	Yes	Yes	No
Austria	Reformed Church in Austria	Yes Since 1999	Yes Since 1999	Yes Since 2019	Yes	No
Austria	Old Catholic Church of Austria	Yes	Yes Since 2022	Yes Since 2022	No	No
Belgium	Ecumenical Catholic Communion	Yes	Yes	Yes	No	No
Belgium	United Protestant Church in Belgium	Yes Since 2015	Yes Since 2007	Yes Since 2007	Yes	No
Czech Republic	Evangelical Church of Czech Brethren	Yes Since 2023	Yes Since 2023	Yes Since 2023	Yes	No
Czech Republic	Old Catholic Church of the Czech Republic	Yes Since 2022	Yes Since 2022	Yes Since 2025	No	Yes
Denmark	Church of Denmark	Yes Since 2012	Yes Since 2012	Yes Since 2012	Yes	No
Finland	Evangelical Lutheran Church of Finland	Yes Since 2025	Yes Since 2025	Yes Since 2025	Yes	No
Finland	Metropolitan Community Church	Yes Since 1968	Yes Since 1969	Yes Since 1969	No	Yes
France	United Protestant Church of France	Yes Since 2015	Yes Since 2015	Yes Since 2015	Yes	No
France	Union of Protestant Churches of Alsace and Lorraine	Yes Since 2019	Yes Since 2019	Yes Since 2019	Yes	No
Georgia	Association of Welcoming and Affirming Baptists	Yes Since 1993	Yes Since 1993	Yes	No	Yes
Germany	Catholic Diocese of the Old Catholics in Germany	Yes Since 2003	Yes Since 2003	Yes Since 2021	No	No
Germany	Evangelical Church in Germany	Yes Since 2016	Yes Since 2016	Yes Since 2016	Yes	No
Germany	Metropolitan Community Church	Yes Since 1968	Yes Since 1969	Yes Since 1969	No	Yes
Iceland	Church of Iceland	Yes Since 2008	Yes Since 2008	Yes Since 2015	No	No
Italy	Lutheran Evangelical Church in Italy	Yes Since 2011	Yes Since 2011	No	Yes	No
Italy	Metropolitan Community Church	Yes Since 1968	Yes Since 1969	Yes Since 1969	No	Yes
Italy	Waldensian Evangelical Church	Yes Since 2010	Yes Since 2010	No	Yes	No
Ireland	Religious Society of Friends (Quakers)	Yes Since 2018	Yes Since 2018	Yes Since 2018	Yes	No
Ireland	Unitarian Church in Ireland	Yes	Yes	Yes	Yes	No
Norway	Church of Norway	Yes Since 2007	Yes Since 2008	Yes Since 2016	Yes	No
Netherlands	Old Catholic Church of the Netherlands	Yes Since 1996	Yes Since 1996	Yes Since 2006	No	Yes
Netherlands	Protestant Church in the Netherlands	Yes Since 2004	Yes Since 2004	Yes Since 2004	Yes	No
Netherlands	Remonstrants Broederschap	Yes Since 1986	Yes Since 1986	Yes	Yes	No
Netherlands	Mennonite Church in the Netherlands	Yes	Yes	Yes Since 2001	Yes	No
Poland	Reformed Catholic Church in Poland (Ecumenical Catholic Communion)	Yes	Yes	Yes	No	Yes
Spain	Spanish Evangelical Church	Yes Since 2015	Yes Since 2015	Yes Since 2015	Yes	No
Sweden	Church of Sweden	Yes Since 2009	Yes Since 2009	Yes Since 2009	Yes	No
Sweden	Uniting Church in Sweden	Yes	Yes	Yes	Yes	No
Switzerland	Christian Catholic Church of Switzerland	Yes Since 2007	Yes Since 2007	Yes Since 2022	No	Yes
Switzerland	Protestant Church of Switzerland	Yes	Yes Since 2019	Yes Since 2019	Yes	No
United Kingdom	Baptist Union of Great Britain	No	Yes Since 2014	Yes Since 2014	Yes	Affirm : Since 2000
United Kingdom	Church of England	Yes Since 2024	No	No	Yes	No
United Kingdom	Church in Wales	Yes Since 2005	Yes Since 2021	No	Yes	No
United Kingdom	Scottish Episcopal Church	Yes Since 2005	Yes Since 2017	Yes Since 2017	Yes	No
United Kingdom	Church of Scotland	Yes Since 2016	Yes Since 2022	Yes Since 2022	Yes	No
United Kingdom	Methodist Church of Great Britain	Yes Since 1993	Yes Since 2021	Yes Since 2021	Yes	No
United Kingdom	Metropolitan Community Church	Yes Since 1968	Yes Since 1969	Yes Since 1969	No	Yes
United Kingdom	General Assembly of Unitarian and Free Christian Churches	Yes	Yes Since 2012	Yes Since 2012	Yes	No
United Kingdom	Religious Society of Friends (Quakers)	Yes Since 2009	Yes Since 2009	Yes Since 2009	Yes	No
United Kingdom	United Ecumenical Catholic Church	Yes	Yes	Yes	No	Yes
United Kingdom	United Reformed Church	Yes Since 2012	Yes Since 2012	Yes Since 2016	Yes	No
United Kingdom	Open Episcopal Church	Yes	Yes	Yes	Yes	No

== Oceania ==
Country	Denomination	Ordination of LGBTQ ministers	Blessing of same-sex unions	Blessings of same-sex marriage	Decisions left to local churches or dioceses	Network of Inclusive Churches
Australia	Open Baptists Association	Yes	Yes	Yes	Yes	No
Australia	Anglican Church of Australia	Yes	Yes Since 2020	No	Yes	No
Australia	Community of Christ	Yes Since 2013	Yes Since 2013	Yes Since 2013	Yes	Harmony : Since 1982
Australia	Metropolitan Community Church	Yes Since 1968	Yes Since 1969	Yes Since 1969	No	Yes
Australia	Uniting Church in Australia	Yes Since 2003	Yes Since 2015	Yes Since 2018	Yes	Uniting Network Australia : Since 1994
Australia	United Ecumenical Catholic Church in Australia	Yes	Yes	Yes	Yes	No
Australia	Religious Society of Friends (Quakers)	Yes Since 2010	Yes Since 2010	Yes Since 2010	Yes	No
Australia	Covenant Network (Pentecostal)	Yes	Yes	Yes	No	Yes
New Zealand	Anglican Church in New Zealand	Yes Since 2018	Yes Since 2018	Yes Since 2018	Yes	No
New Zealand	Metropolitan Community Church	Yes Since 1968	Yes Since 1969	Yes Since 1969	No	Yes
New Zealand	Methodist Church of New Zealand	Yes Since 1999	Yes Since 1999	Yes Since 2013	Yes	No

== Organizations not recognized by their denominations ==
Countries	Denomination	Organization	Ordination of LGBTQ ministers	Blessing of same-sex unions	Blessings of same-sex marriage	Local groups
International	The Church of Jesus Christ of Latter-day Saints	Affirmation: LGBTQ Mormons, Families, & Friends	Yes	No	No	Yes
International	Seventh-day Adventist Church	SDA Kinship International	Yes	Yes	Yes	Yes
International	Christian Science	Emergence International	Yes	Yes	Yes	Yes
United States	Roman Catholic Church	Call to Action	Yes	Yes	Yes	Yes
United States	Roman Catholic Church	DignityUSA	Yes	Yes	Yes	Yes
United States	Roman Catholic Church	Fortunate Families	Yes	Yes	Yes	Yes
United States	Church of God (Anderson, Indiana)	ChogAffirm	Yes	Yes	Yes	No
United States	Eastern Orthodox Church	Axios	Yes	Yes	Yes	Yes
United Kingdom	Anglican Communion	Changing Attitude	Yes	Yes	Yes	Yes

== Ecumenical organizations ==
Countries	Organization	Ordination of LGBTQ ministers	Blessing of same-sex unions	Blessings of same-sex marriage
Europe	European Forum of LGBT Christian Groups	Yes	Yes	Yes
United States	Believe Out Loud	Yes	Yes	Yes
United States	Evangelicals Concerned	Yes	Yes	Yes
United States	Q Christian Fellowship	Yes	Yes	Yes
United States	Reformation Project	Yes	Yes	Yes
Czech Republic	Logos Česká republika	Yes	Yes	Yes
Russia	Nuntiare et Recreare	Yes	Yes	Yes
South Africa	Inclusive & Affirming Ministries South Africa	Yes	Yes	Yes
United Kingdom	Inclusive Church	Yes	Yes	Yes
United Kingdom	OneBodyOneFaith	Yes	Yes	Yes

== See also ==
- LGBTQ clergy in Christianity
- Blessing of same-sex unions in Christian churches
- Sexual practices between women
- Sexual practices between men
- Same-sex parenting
- Queer theology
- Progressive Christianity
