= Homosexuality and Baptist churches =

The positions of the Baptist churches about homosexuality are varied. The main ones being conservative fundamentalist or moderate, liberal and progressive. Some Baptist associations support blessings of same-sex marriage.

== Basic beliefs ==
There is a diversity of views of Baptist denominations on homosexuality. Most denominations remain conservative, believing in what they describe as 'traditional' marriage between one man and one woman. Some denominations allow local and autonomous congregations to determine their own regional policies. Some Baptist denominations supports same-sex marriage.

== Denominational positions ==
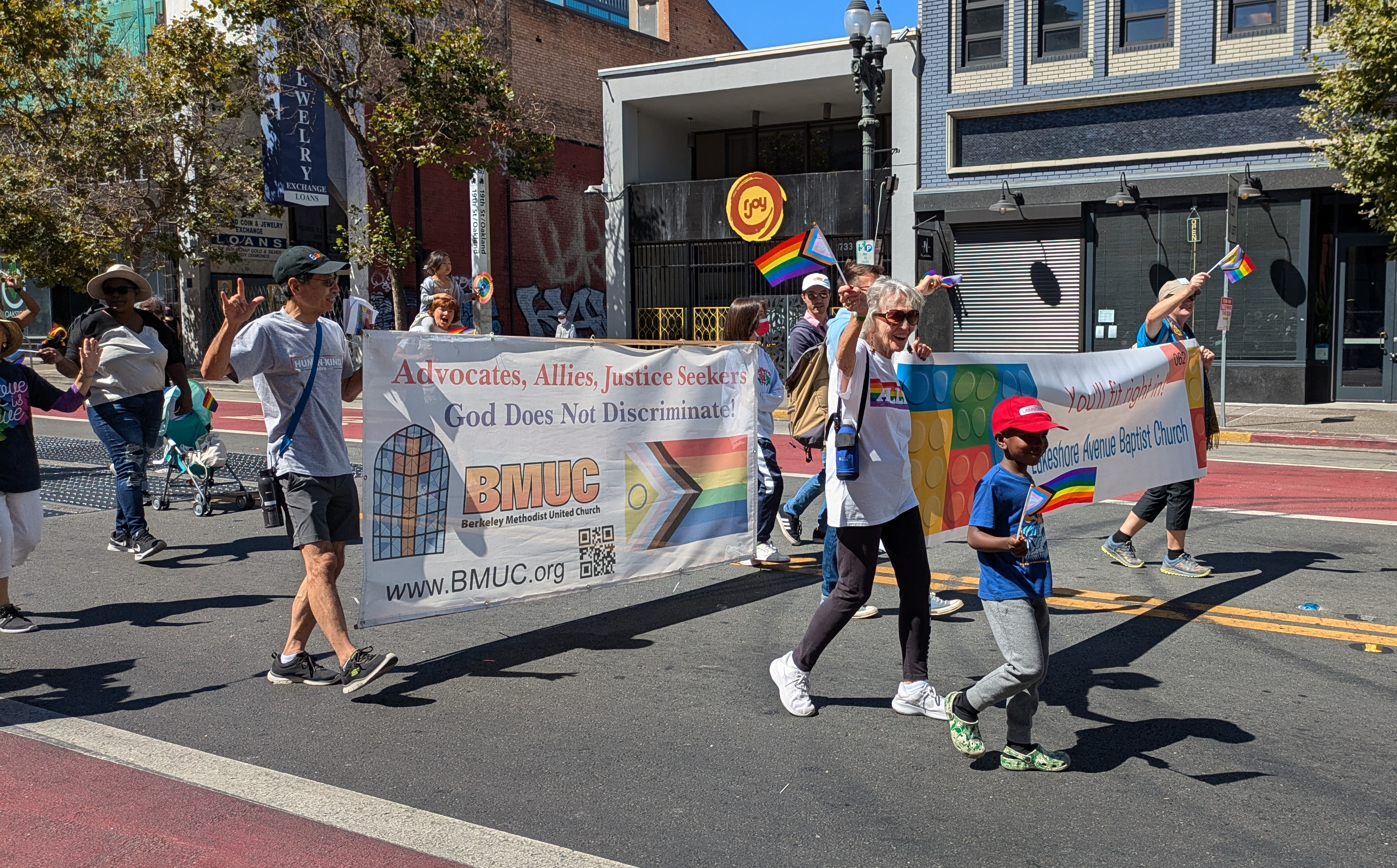
A Baptist church represented at a pride parade in Oakland, California, United States

Several organizations and denominations of Baptist churches have issued statements and resolutions about homosexuality.

=== International denominations ===
==== Fundamentalist position ====
In some Independent Baptist churches, there are anti-LGBT activists.

==== Conservative position ====
The vast majority of Baptist denominations around the world hold a conservative view on homosexuality, like those gathered in the Baptist World Alliance. They only support sexuality in marriage between a man and a woman, but show sympathy and respect towards LGBT people. Churches thus see themselves as “welcoming, but not affirming”. This expression has its origin in the book Welcoming but Not Affirming: An Evangelical Response to Homosexuality published in 1998 by the American Baptist theologian Stanley Grenz.

==== Inclusive position ====
The Association of Welcoming and Affirming Baptists is made up of Baptist churches, organizations, and individuals who welcome and affirm people regardless of sexual orientation or gender identity, and advocate for LGBTQ people inclusion within Baptist faith communities.

=== National denominations ===
==== Neutral position ====
Some Baptist denominations do not have official beliefs about marriage in a confession of faith and invoke congregationalism to leave the choice to each church to decide.

- The Canadian Association for Baptist Freedoms
- The American Baptist Churches USA released a statement following the legalization of same-sex marriage by the Supreme Court of the United States saying that the denomination will "respect and will continue to respect congregational freedom on this issue." While the General Board had previously voted to define marriage as "between one man and one woman," the denomination did not adopt the policy statement. The ABCUSA "allows individual congregations to decide whether to ordain LGBT clergy or perform same-sex marriages" and does not have a denomination-wide policy.
- The Progressive National Baptist Convention (USA) does not have an official position and, like many Baptist denominations, allows individual congregations to determine their own view. As a result, some congregations have performed blessings and marriages for same-sex couples.
- The Cooperative Baptist Fellowship (USA) allows individual organizations and churches to support or fund gay rights advocacy if they so choose, but it is not required or prohibited. In February 2018, the association removed a statement from its hiring policy prohibiting the hiring of LGBT staff members or sending LGBT missionaries, mentioning that leadership positions were reserved for those living in faithful celibacy in marriage between a woman and a man. In June 2018, the Affirming Network for full LGBTQ inclusion and affirmation was founded.
- The National Baptist Convention, USA passed a resolution in 2012 affirming that marriage is a union between a man and a woman, but mentioned that it leaves autonomy to each church to decide on the subject.
- The Baptist Union of Great Britain stated in a 2024 consultation that the Council upholds the liberty of the local church to appoint ministry according to their governing documents.
- The Open Baptists Association (Australia)

==== Inclusive position ====
Some Baptist denominations supports same-sex marriage.

- The Alliance of Baptists (USA).
- The Aliança de Batistas do Brasil.
- The Fraternidad de Iglesias Bautistas de Cuba.

== See also ==
- Blessing of same-sex unions in Christian churches
