= Evangelical Catholic Church =

Evangelical Catholic Church may refer to the following:

- Evangelical Catholic Church (Lutheran), a High Church Lutheran denomination founded in 1976
- Evangelical Catholic Church (Independent Catholic), an Independent Catholic denomination founded in 1997
