= Affirming Pentecostal Church International =

Pentecostal denomination

Affirming Pentecostal Church International (APCI) is an LGBT-affirming, Oneness Pentecostal denomination. It was founded December 5, 2010 in Indianapolis, Indiana. The APCI claims to have established congregations across the Americas, Africa, and the British Isles.
