= Emergence International =

LGBT support organization

Emergence International (EI) is a worldwide community of Christian Scientists and their families and friends, with the purpose of supporting lesbian, gay, bisexual, and transgender (LGBTQ) people and to advocate for change in the Christian Science movement.

== History ==
By the late 1970s, groups of Christian Scientists were meeting in no fewer than six cities in the United States and United Kingdom. The first conference for representatives from some of these groups met in Chicago in 1983. Following a second conference in 1985, several participants decided to develop a national identity for gay Christian Scientists and Emergence International was born.

The name derives from a quote by Mrs. Eddy: "Emerge gently from matter into Spirit. Think not to thwart the spiritual ultimate of all things, but come naturally into Spirit through better health and morals and as the result of spiritual growth."

== Activities ==
The organization hosts an annual conference where papers, workshops, and a unique worship service are presented. Conferences are held in various cities in the United States.

== See also ==
- Homosexuality and Christianity
- List of Christian denominational positions on homosexuality
- List of Christian Science tenets, prayers, and statements
- Craig Rodwell, a notable gay activist who was a Christian Scientist
