= Reconciling Ministries Network =

- Classification: Progressive Christianity
- Theology: Methodist
- Associations: United Methodist Church
- Region: 5 countries
- Origin: 1984
- Congregations: 1,439
- Official website: rmnetwork.org

The Reconciling Ministries Network (RMN) is an international inclusive Methodist churches network. It is affiliated with the United Methodist Church.

== History ==
The group was founded in 1983 as the Reconciling Congregation Program as part of Affirmation: United Methodists for Lesbian/Gay Concerns. It was created as a system for congregations to publicly support lesbians and gay men, and welcome them to full participation in the life of the church both locally and beyond the local congregation. The group was named "Reconciling Congregations" in reference to discussion regarding the need for reconciliation between gay people and the church.

In 1984, the United Methodist Church, at its General Conference, added to its Book of Discipline the statement that "no self-avowed, practicing homosexual shall be ordained or appointed in the United Methodist Church." Affirmation members gathered outside the meeting hall, inviting churches to join the Reconciling Congregations. Soon after, the first two congregations declared themselves to be part of the movement: Washington Square United Methodist Church in New York City, and Wesley United Methodist Church in Fresno, California.

As the program grew, it broke away from Affirmation, becoming autonomous in 1989. The name changed to its current name in October 2000 as a recognition that the diverse ministries the program was serving went beyond congregations.

RMN members have challenged United Methodist policies on same-sex relationships. After pastor Jimmy Creech officiated at a union ceremony for two lesbians, the church in 1996 forbade any same-sex commitment ceremonies to be celebrated in United Methodist churches or by United Methodist pastors.

In 1999, 95 clergy officiated in a union service for Jeanne Barnett and Ellie Charlton. Later that year, Reverend Gregory Dell was tried and found guilty of violating Methodist policy in officiating at the marriage of two men in his church.

In 2000, 229 members of the Reconciling Ministries and Soulforce were arrested at the United Methodist Church's General Conference. 29 more were arrested when they entered the conference floor to protest church policies regarding LGBTQ people. At the 2004 General Conference, some conservative Methodists proposed that the denomination split over the question of inclusion of LGBT people, a proposal which did not meet with wide approval.

In 2006, the organization became active in a dispute over a pastor's right to refuse membership to an LGBTQ churchgoer.

On February 23 through February 26, 2019, General Conference met in St. Louis, Missouri, to address the single issue of language in the Book of Discipline about human sexuality. In total, 129 Annual Conferences were represented. Of those, 54 Annual Conferences representing 7 million members were from the United States and 75 Annual Conferences representing 5.7 million members were from Europe, Eurasia, the Philippines, and Africa. At least eight countries that criminalize homosexuality (Sierra Leone, Liberia, Nigeria, Zimbabwe, Zambia, Tanzania, Burundi, and Kenya) were represented. Despite advocacy by RMN, the Traditional Plan, "which excludes LGBTQ persons from ordained leadership and prohibits ministers from officiating at same-sex marriages", passed with a vote of 438 in favor and 384 against.

During the 2020-2023 period, over 7,660 conservative congregations in the United States disaffiliated from the UMC, largely over continued tensions within conferences over LGBT parishioners and clergy.

For the Postponed 2020 General Conference, held April 25-May 3, 2024, RMN jointly formed the UM Queer Collaborative, a coalition with the United Methodist Queer Clergy Caucus, Affirmation, the United Methodist Queer Clergy Caucus (UMQCC) and the Queer Delegates Caucus (QDC), in order to advocate for votes in favor of amendments to church law and the Social Principles to repeal anti-LGBT language, including the Traditional Plan, and allow for regionalization of the denomination. Having lost many supporters of the Traditional Plan since 2019, the General Conference passed the pro-LGBT legislation and submitted the constitutional amendment for regionalization to the Annual Conferences for ratification.

In 2025, it has 1,439 churches in 5 countries.

== Beliefs ==
=== Marriage ===
The network support blessings of same-sex marriage.

== Relationships within the UMC ==
Since its beginnings, the RMN and other organizations have had some success in advocating for change within the denomination. The Connectional Table, a governing committee of the UMC, approved legislation to create a localized option allowing regional conferences to marry same-sex couples. In 2016, the New York Annual Conference and Baltimore-Washington Annual Conference voted to allow openly gay and lesbian clergy and the Baltimore conference ordained a partnered lesbian to the provisional diaconate. The Methodist Federation for Social Action has also been invited to work with RMN.

== Reception ==
In 1986, the Northern Illinois and Wisconsin conferences of the United Methodist Church supported the Reconciling Ministries, but The United Methodist Reporter refused to accept advertising from the group, saying that it violated Methodist policies by "promoting the acceptance of homosexuality." The publication eventually accepted a classified ad from RMN in 1994. In 2012, 15 Annual Conferences (local governing bodies in the Church) voted to support same-sex marriage and LGBTQ inclusion in the church. In 2015, the New York, Baltimore-Washington, and Great Plains conferences also voted to support same-sex marriage. In a similar vote, the Virginia Annual Conference has petitioned the General Conference to allow openly gay and lesbian clergy. In 2016, the Indigo Girls were featured at a benefit concert and called on the UMC to support marriage equality.

== Convocations ==
The first convocation of the organization was held in 1987 in Chicago, Illinois. Convocations have been held biannually since then.

The 2005 convocation, "Hearts on Fire," was held at the United Methodist retreat at Lake Junaluska, North Carolina. It received much attention in the press, and was protested by members of the KKK.

The 2007 convocation, "Faith, Hope, Love," was held in Nashville, Tennessee at Vanderbilt University. This event was attended by almost 400 Methodists, including almost 50 young people.

The 2009 convocation, "Justice and Joy," was held in Estes Park, Colorado over labor day weekend. Over 500 persons attended, with almost 100 young persons.

The 2011 convocation, "Sing A New Song," was held in Huron, Ohio in conjunction with the Methodist Federation for Social Action (MFSA).

The 2013 convocation, "Churchquake," was held in Chevy Chase, Maryland.

The 2015 convocation, "Gather at the River", was held in San Antonio, Texas in cooperation with other organizations including MFSA. Speakers included Rev. Frank Schaefer, Marcia McFee, Mark A. Miller, Theon Johnson, Nikilas mawanda, Peter Storey, and Sara Thompson Tweedy.

The 2018 convocation, "A Place at the Table," was held in St. Louis, MO in conjunction with the Love Your Neighbor Coalition (LYNC) affiliate organizations.

The 2023 convocation, "Onward to Perfection," was held at First UMC in Charlotte, NC, celebrating 40 years of the movement. The first convocation since the COVID pandemic, it was attended by more than 280 in-person and 100+ online. Discussion of, and strategizing for, inclusive legislative initiatives at the 2024 General Conference made up a significant portion of the convocation's content.

== Publications ==
In 1985, Reconciling Ministries Network began publishing the quarterly magazine Manna for the Journey. The magazine was renamed Open Hands in 1986. In 1988, it received the Award of Merit for publications with fewer than 10,000 subscribers from the Associated Church Press for its second issue, "Living and Loving with AIDS." In 1992, it again received the Award of Merit. The magazine ceased publication in 2002.

Reconciling Ministries Network publishes a quarterly newsletter, available both in print and online, called Katalyst. Additionally, there is a biweekly "Flashnet" e-newsletter, which is emailed to subscribers and also available on RMN's website.

== See also ==
- List of Christian denominations affirming LGBTQ people
- Taskforce of United Methodists on Abortion and Sexuality
- ReconcilingWorks, a similar organization within North American Lutheranism
