= Jeanne Barnett =

American activist (1930–2003)

- Born: Velma Jean Barnett; May 28, 1930; Waynoka, Oklahoma, U.S.
- Died: October 1, 2003 (age 73)
- Occupations: Activist, state official
- Spouse: Ellie Charlton

Jeanne Barnett (May 28, 1930 – October 1, 2003) was an American activist and a California state employment official. She was active in the United Methodist Church for the inclusion of LGBT members and clergy, and her 1999 "holy union ceremony" in Sacramento was a well-publicized protest against denominational policies.

== Early life and education ==
Barnett was born in Waynoka, Oklahoma, the daughter of Ernest I. Barnett and Faye Ann Hudson Barnett. She graduated from the University of Tulsa in 1952, where she played varsity basketball and earned a bachelor's degree in music.

== Career ==
Barnett worked in California's Employment Development Department from 1959 to 1991; her career culminated as Chief of the Employment Data and Research Division, based in Sacramento.

Barnett was active in United Methodist Church work at the local, regional, and national levels. She was involved in National Affirmation: United Methodists for LGBT Concerns, and the California-Nevada Reconciling Conference Committee, both bodies working for greater inclusion of LGBT members and clergy in the Methodist community. She was the only lesbian member of the denomination's national United Methodist Committee to Study Homosexuality, in 1998.

In 1999, Barnett and her longtime partner Ellie Charlton were married in a union ceremony at the Sacramento Convention Center, with more than a hundred Methodist ministers officiating together, as a show of "ecclesiastical disobedience" against the denomination's ban on ordained clergy performing same-sex weddings. The event was widely publicized, and covered in the national news media, the LGBT press, and in the Christian press.

== Personal life ==
Barnett and Ellie Charlton became life partners in the early 1980s, and married in a religious ceremony in 1999. Barnett had a stroke in 1995, and she died in 2003, at the age of 73, from a heart attack. A large collection of Barnett's papers are housed in the Drew University Methodist Library, with smaller collections in the Center for Sacramento History and at the GLBT Historical Society of Northern California. In 2004, she was honored posthumously at a reunion event marking what would have been her fifth wedding anniversary.
