= Evangelical Anglican Church In America =

Christian denomination

- Classification: Anglican
- Orientation: Anglo-Catholic and Evangelical
- Origin: December 4, 1994; California
- Congregations: 5
- Majority of ministers are involved in non-parochial ministry.

The Evangelical Anglican Church In America (EACA) is an independent denomination of Anglo-Catholicism. It is counted as a member of the Old Catholic faith community, deriving, its apostolic succession, in first instances, from it. Secondary lines of succession arise from both autocephalous Orthodox Churches as well as Eastern Catholic Churches.

It differs little in matters of church polity, doctrine or worship from other churches within the Anglican Communion, fully accepting the Thirty-Nine Articles of Faith as the basis of doctrine and its theology is founded on Scripture, Tradition and Reason. Its spectrum of liturgy allows for both a Low church (Evangelical) as well as a High Church (Traditional Catholic) approach to community worship, although the latter predominates.

It supports the growing call for an Inclusive Church which "affirms the Church's mission, in obedience to Holy Scripture, is to proclaim the Gospel of Jesus Christ in every generation. We acknowledge that this is Good News for people regardless of their gender, race or sexual orientation. We believe that, in order to strengthen the Gospel's proclamation of justice to the world, and for the greater glory of God, the Church's own common life must be justly ordered. To that end, we call on our Church to live out the promise of the Gospel; to celebrate the diverse gifts of all the members of the Body of Christ; and in the ordering of our common life to open the ministries of deacon, priest and bishop to those called to serve by God, regardless of their sex, race or sexual orientation".

In October 2002, the Church entered into a Concordat Agreement with the Open Episcopal Church resulting in full intercommunion.

== See also ==
- Christianity and sexual orientation
- Homosexuality and the Anglican Communion
- Society for the Study of Anglicanism
