= Association of Welcoming and Affirming Baptists =

Progressive Baptist Christian association

- Classification: Mainline
- Theology: Progressive Baptist
- Region: 5 countries
- Headquarters: Louisville, Kentucky, United States
- Origin: 1993
- Congregations: 192
- Seminaries: 5
- Official website: awab.org

The Association of Welcoming & Affirming Baptists (AWAB) is an international Progressive Baptist Christian association of churches. The headquarters is in Louisville, Kentucky within the United States.

== History ==
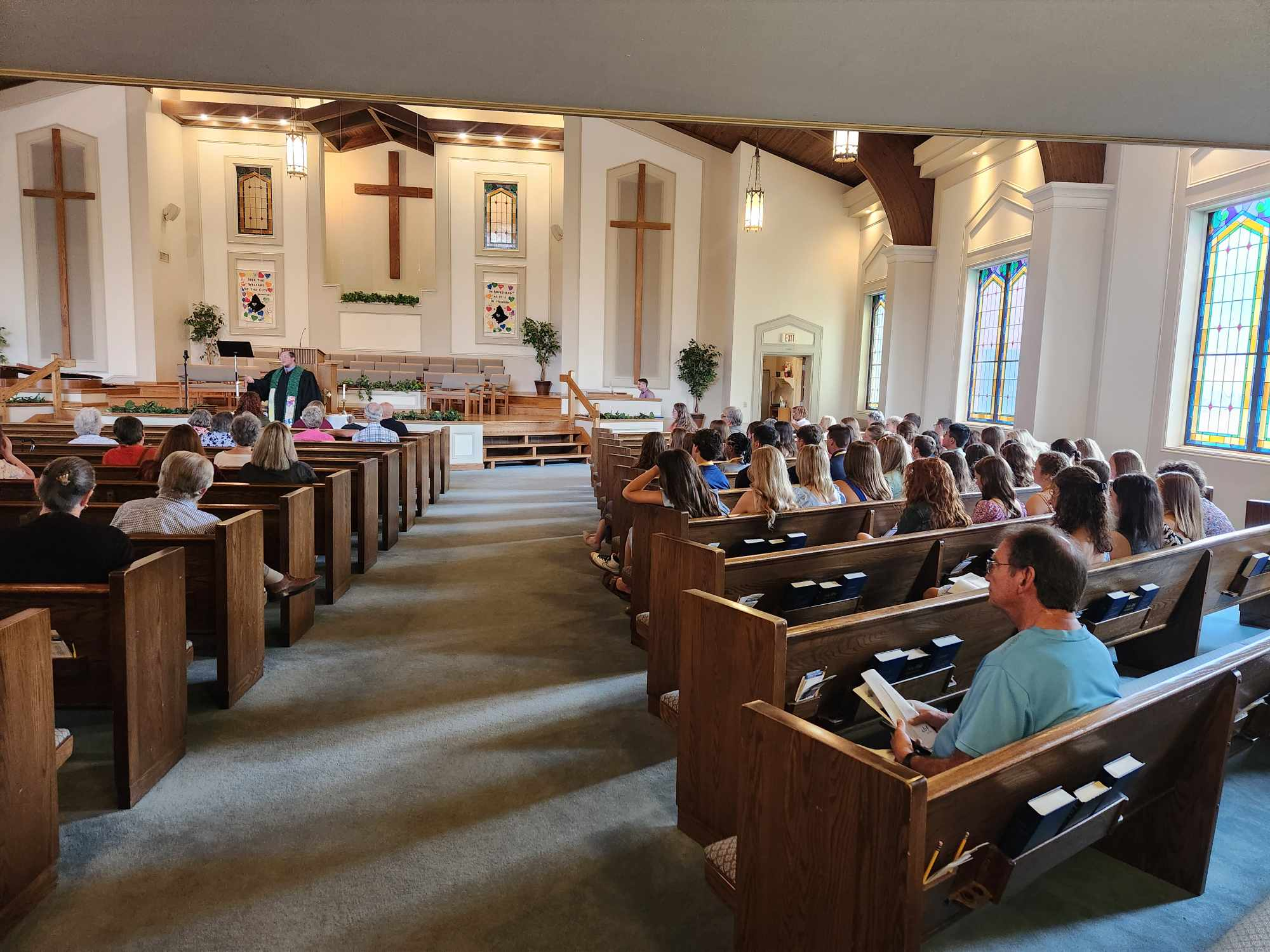
Worship service at First Baptist Church of Morehead, Kentucky.

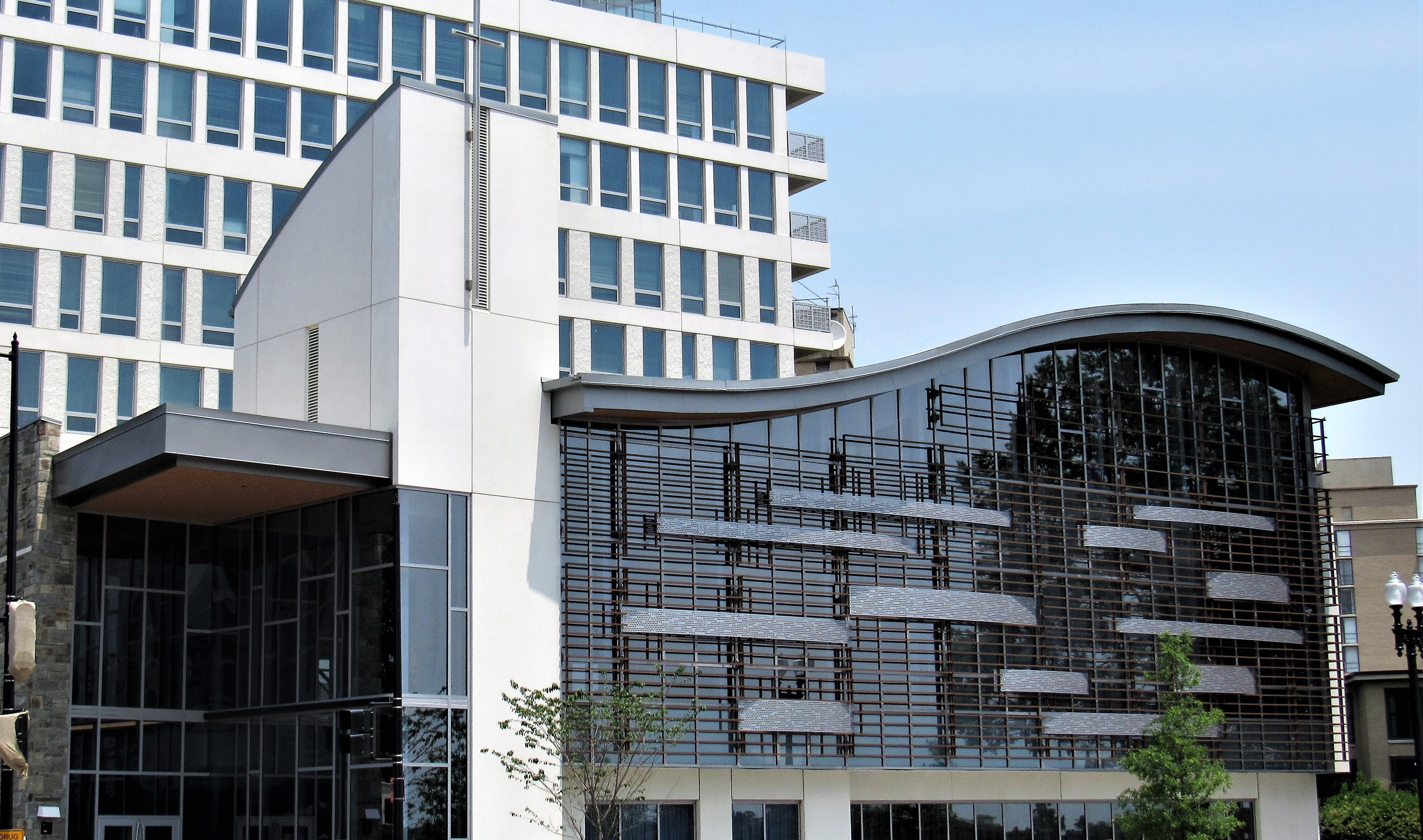
Riverside Baptist Church of Washington, D.C..

The association has its origins in the founding of American Baptists Concerned for Sexual Minorities in May 1972 by members of the American Baptist Churches USA for the inclusion of LGBTQ people.

At a convention in San Jose, California in 1993, the association replaced the latter. In 1996, Lakeshore Avenue Baptist Church in Oakland, California ordained Randle R. Mixon, the first openly gay Baptist minister.

In 2007, it had 69 member churches.

The organization merged with the Affirming Network of the Cooperative Baptist Fellowship in 2024.

According to an association census released in 2025, it has 192 churches in five countries.

== Beliefs ==
=== Marriage ===
The association supports blessings of same-sex marriage.

== Schools ==
It has five member theological institutes.

== See also ==
- Homosexuality and Baptist churches
- Christianity and homosexuality
- List of Christian denominations affirming LGBT people
- Progressive Baptist churches
- Blessing of same-sex unions in Christian churches
