= More Light Presbyterians =

U.S. non-profit organization

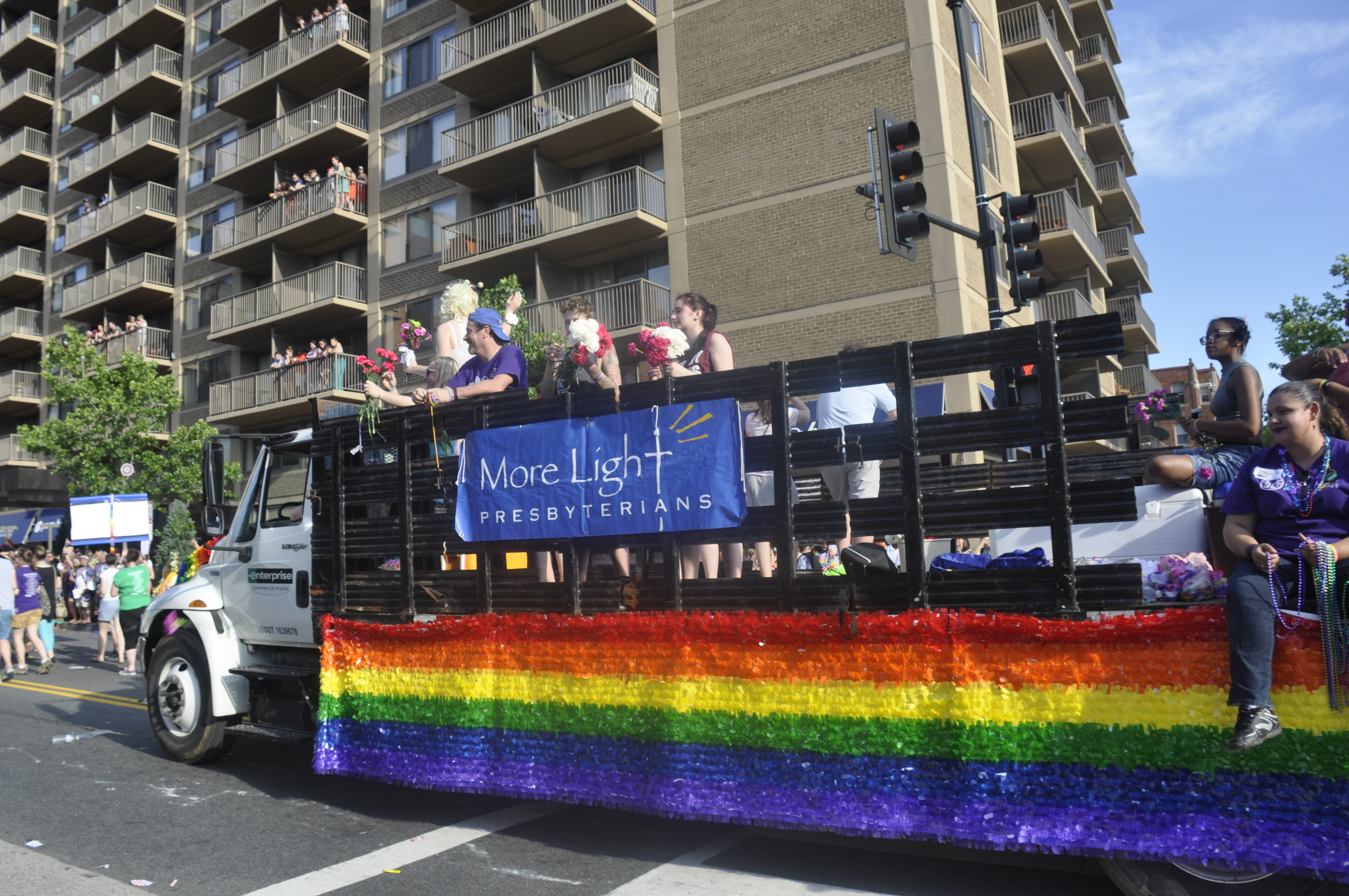
- Classification: Progressive Christianity
- Theology: Presbyterian
- Associations: Presbyterian Church (USA)
- Region: USA
- Origin: 1974
- Congregations: 230
- Official website: mlp.org

More Light Presbyterians is an inclusive Presbyterian churches network. It is affiliated with the Presbyterian Church (USA).

== History ==
=== Origins ===
The origins of the More Light movement date to 1974, when at a meeting of the annual Presbyterian General Assembly, Rev. David Bailey Sindt held up a sign reading "Is anybody else out there gay?" Sindt was an openly gay man who had been called by the Session (i.e., governing body) of Lincoln Park Presbyterian Church in Chicago to serve as an assistant pastor, yet had been blocked from taking up this call.

During the 1974 gathering, Sindt also invited sympathetic individuals within the church to join what he first called the "Presbyterian Gay Caucus" and later changed to "Presbyterians for Gay Concerns" and then "Presbyterians for Lesbian/Gay Concerns (PLGC)" to better reflect the caucus' membership. The aim of the caucus would be to serve as a forum for both political and advocacy activities by Presbyterians who care about full inclusion of all in the life of the church, from local mission activities to full membership to ordination.

William P. Thompson, Stated Clerk of the assembly, subsequently invited PLGC to submit a report at the General Assembly's next annual meeting (something that all national Presbyterian organizations were then required to do as part of receiving recognition as an official caucus). However, at the 1975 General Assembly meetings—and after two hours of debate—commissioners refused to accept the group's report and, thus, to grant it official status. Nonetheless, the advocacy and engagement work of the caucus continued on an unofficial basis. Subsequent reports from the group would also be written for, submitted to, and rejected by the General Assembly up until 1979.

=== Late 1970s ===
During this period, multiple congregations—notably Munn Avenue Presbyterian Church and West Hollywood Presbyterian Church—began to organize their own formal efforts to actively welcome lesbian and gay individuals into the life of the church, while Sindt continued his work with both his home church and PLGC. At the national level, the Presbyterian General Assembly also commissioned a task force to explore questions related to potentially greater inclusion of homosexual individuals in the church at-large.

Nonetheless, at the 1978 General Assembly meetings, commissioners moved to approve a statement that said that "homosexuality is not God's wish for humanity" and "unrepentant homosexual practice does not accord with the requirements for ordination."

In response, several Presbyterian congregations began identifying as "More Light Churches" as a means of signaling their own formal adoption of policies welcoming lesbian and gay members within the church, including their affirmation of these individuals' right to ordination as deacon and elder if elected by the congregation and found qualified by the session. The first congregation to make a formal statement from the pulpit declaring itself a More Light Church was West-Park Presbyterian Church in Manhattan. At that time, Rev. Robert Davidson, pastor of West Park made the following statement:

In harmony with the General Assembly of the United Presbyterian Church, West-Park Church affirms the civil rights of all persons. Further, in keeping with our General Assembly’s guidelines, this community of faith welcomes as members homosexual persons who both seek and have found Christ’s love.

This local congregation will not select one particular element from a person’s total humanity as a basis for denying full participation and service in the body of Christ. Nor will this community of faith condemn or judge our brothers and sisters who declare their faith in Jesus Christ as Lord and Savior and promise discipleship to Him. We affirm that in meeting each other in Christian love. God’s spirit frees us all to live and grow, liberated from the oppression invoked upon us by ourselves and others.

Within this context, West-Park Presbyterian Church reaches out to Christian and non-Christian homosexual persons with a ministry of support, caring and openness—a ministry in which the creative, liberating power of the Holy Spirit rules and guides.

=== 1980s and 1990s ===
In the interim decades, More Light Churches continued to promote the full participation of lesbian and gay individuals in the life of the church, including via organized advocacy and protests, as well as by ordaining relevant individuals (a practice that, at times, led to court cases being brought against these churches or, in the case of minsters, formal rejection of their selection by regional- and national- governing bodies). Alongside this, the More Light Churches Network (MLCN) was formalized in 1992 to further promote coordination and engagement among More Light Churches.

In January 1999, the MLCN officially combined with the Presbyterians for Lesbian/Gay Concerns to make a single organization, More Light Presbyterians.

=== 2000s and Beyond ===
In 2011, after over 30 years of debate, the Presbyterian Church (USA) finally voted to amend its constitution to allow openly gay people in same-sex relationships to serve as ministers, elders, and deacons. At the time, More Light's then-spokesperson Rev. Heidi Vardeman was quoted by the New York Times as saying,

Finally, the denomination has seen the error of its ways and it will repent, which means, literally, to turn around. I’ve had young people who have been exemplary, obviously good candidates for the ministry... but then you have to have this weird conversation in which you say that, umm, because they might be gay or lesbian, it’s not going to work. But now we’re free! We can endorse and propose and assist and elect those whom God has called.

Three years later, the Presbyterian Church (USA) would take another major step to advance LGBTQIA+ participation by voting at the 2014 General Assembly to allow clergy to perform marriages involving same-sex couples; a move More Light's then-executive director Alex McNeill would call "an answer to many prayers."

In 2015, More Light Presbyterians underwent a discernment process to review its call following the removal of the above barriers to LGBTQIA+ inclusion. Subsequently, its work has focused on both continuing to expand the faith-based movement to oppose discriminatory legislation and helping member churches toward full inclusion and improved ministry services for LGBTQIA+ individuals.

In 2025, it has 230 churches.

== Origin of the name "More Light" ==
John Robinson, spiritual leader of the pilgrims who founded the Plymouth Colony, died in England before he could join his followers in the New World. In 1646, governor Edward Winslow recalled Robinson's farewell to the pilgrims as they set sail on the Mayflower. Robinson had urged the pilgrims to be open to new religious teaching, and:

...if God should reveal anything to us by any other instrument of his, to be as ready to receive it, as ever we were to receive any truth by his Ministry. For he was very confident the Lord had more truth and light yet to break forth out of his holy Word.

No teacher yet had perfect knowledge of God; Robinson had said:

"For though they were precious shining lights in their Times, yet God had not revealed his whole will to them; and were they now living," saith he, "they would be as ready and willing to embrace further light as that they had received."

In the 1850s the Congregationalist hymnwriter George Rawson (1807–1889) used Robinson's speech as the basis of his hymn "We Limit Not the Truth of God," with the lyric:

We limit not the truth of God to our poor reach of mind –
By notions of our day and sect – crude, partial, and confined

That universe, how much unknown! that ocean unexplored
For God hath yet more light and truth to break forth from the Word.

Eternal God, Incarnate Word, Spirit of flame and dove,
enlarge, expand all living souls to comprehend your love;

and help us all to seek your will with wiser powers conferred
O God, grant yet more light and truth to break forth from the Word.

== Beliefs ==
=== Marriage ===
The network support blessings of same-sex marriage.

== See also ==
- List of Christian denominations affirming LGBTQ people
