= Axios (organization) =

LGBTI+ rights organization

Axios is an inclusive Orthodox Christian and Byzantine Rite Catholic association.

== History ==
It was founded in Los Angeles in 1980.

The organization has chapters in several cities.

== Mission ==
The Orthodox Church's teaching is that same-sex relations are sinful in the same manner as all heterosexual practice outside of marriage. Axios also professes that members' "sexuality and love are God given and healthy," but denies any morally significant distinction ceteris paribus between heterosexual and homosexual expressions.

== See also ==
- Courage International
- Homosexuality and Christianity

== Sources ==
- Homosexuality in the Orthodox Church, by Justin R. Cannon
- God Forbid: Religion and Sex in American Public Life by Kathleen M. Sands ISBN 0-19-512162-7
