= ReconcilingWorks =

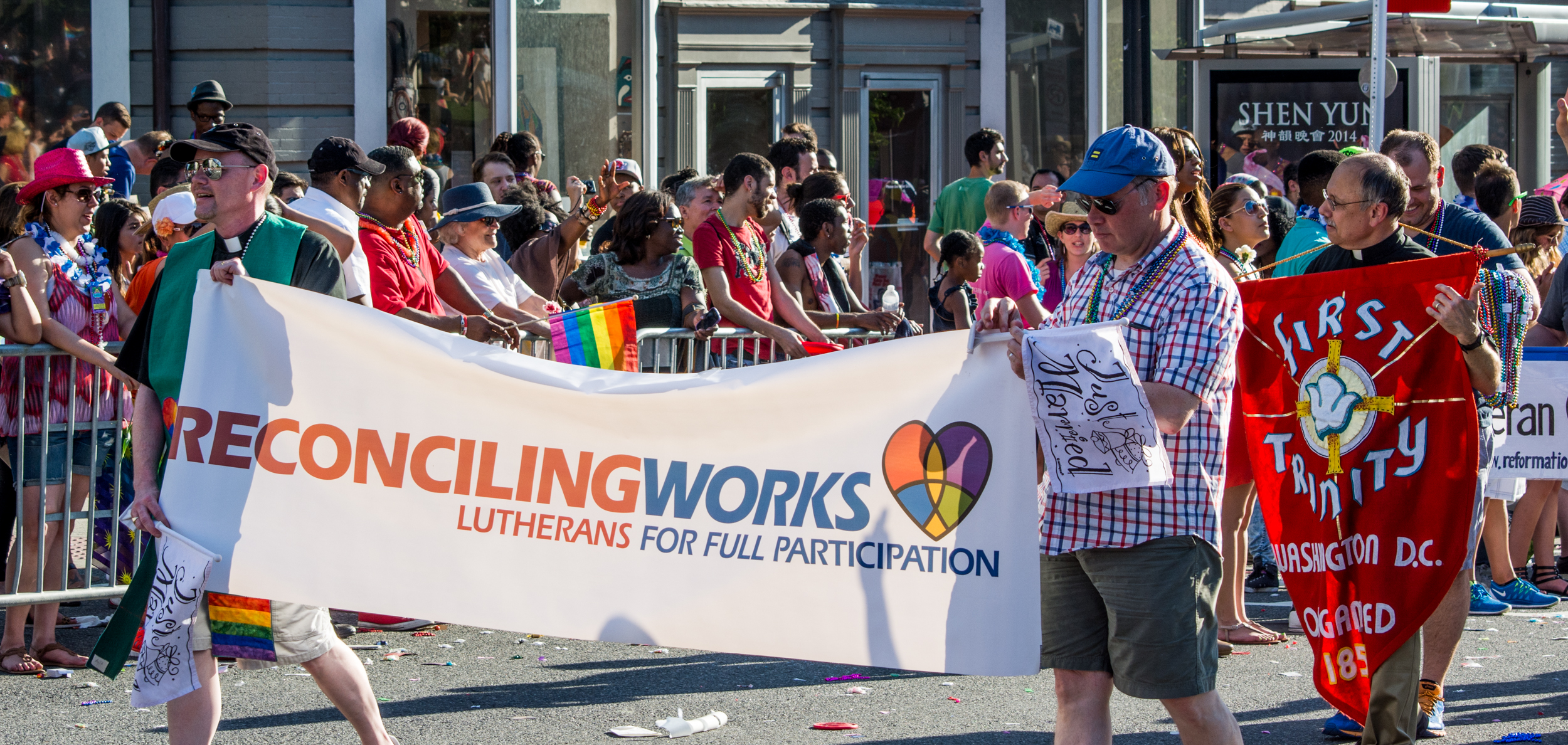
- Classification: Progressive Christianity
- Theology: Lutheran
- Associations: Evangelical Lutheran Church in America and the Evangelical Lutheran Church in Canada
- Region: United States and Canada
- Headquarters: St. Paul, Minnesota, United States
- Origin: June 17, 1974
- Congregations: 1,198
- Tertiary institutions: 2
- Seminaries: 5
- Official website: reconcilingworks.org

ReconcilingWorks is an inclusive Lutheran churches network. It is affiliated with the Evangelical Lutheran Church in America and the Evangelical Lutheran Church in Canada.

ReconcilingWorks's mission statement reads: "Working at the intersection of oppressions, ReconcilingWorks embodies, inspires, advocates and organizes for the acceptance and full participation of people of all sexual orientations and gender identities within the Lutheran communion and its ecumenical and global partners."

ReconcilingWorks's headquarters is in the Twin Cities area of Minnesota.

== History ==
On June 16 and 17, 1974, five people gathered at the invitation of Pastor Jim Siefkes at the University of Minnesota in Minneapolis. Siefkes, a straight ally, then Director for Discovering Ministries in the American Lutheran Church (ALC), had received a grant from the ALC to hold a national meeting of LGBTQ persons and resource persons to discuss their sexual orientation and its effect on their relationship with society and the church.

At that meeting were Allen Blaich (student, University of Utah), Howard Erickson (Minneapolis Star Tribune reporter and contributor to The Advocate), Diane Fraser (assistant professor at Gustavus Adolphus College), Marie Kent (instructor in a Minneapolis home for the mentally challenged) and the Rev. Jim Lokken (American Bible Society, New York).

By the end of the meeting, the group had founded Lutherans Concerned for Gay People (LCGP), run by a steering committee under bylaws Erickson typed out ad hoc in 20 minutes on a typewriter he found in the next room. The organization’s name was Blaich’s idea. The first two coordinators were Blaich and Fraser. Marie Kent became the treasurer. Dues were three dollars. There would be a newsletter, The Gay Lutheran, that Erickson would edit, of which the current quarterly, Concord, is the descendant.

Shortly thereafter, as the ALC intended, LCGP representatives found themselves in dialogue with church officials. LCGP had an information table and provided hospitality at the ALC Convention in Detroit in October 1974.

And just as quickly, LCGP came under persistent and vociferous attack from conservatives, particularly the Lutheran News, run by Herman Otten, founder of the current Christian News. The effect of his attacks was somewhat contrary to his presumed intent, like the proverbial increase of sales resulting from "banning a book in Boston." LCGP membership rose partly because of the wide distribution given by Otten’s publication and the fact that he republished the entire LCGP newsletter in order to foment about it, including the cut-out coupon for joining LCGP.

The first logo was the Lutheran Rose, cut from a book by Erickson. The first assembly of LCGP was in 1978. By then, there were 22 LCGP chapters across the United States, in New England, New York City, Atlanta, New Orleans, Baltimore, San Francisco, Fargo, San Diego, Los Angeles, and elsewhere.

At the 1978 LCGP Assembly the decision was made to shorten the name to Lutherans Concerned because, among other reasons, some found the longer name cumbersome. Late in 1978, the United States Post Office granted Lutherans Concerned nonprofit status.

In 1980 the organization's name was changed again, to Lutherans Concerned/North America (LC/NA), to make visible the continental reach Lutherans Concerned had achieved through its programs and influence. The shortened name, Lutherans Concerned, continued to be used as the working name except in more formal documents and press releases.

The 1980 name change reflected the organization's international nature, with members, chapters, and movement building within the Evangelical Lutheran Church in Canada (ELCIC). Lutherans Concerned in Canada (LCIC) is independently led, with its own board and officers, and voting representation on the main board of ReconcilingWorks.

The "fish" logo was created by Steve Broin and adopted by LC/NA in 1982 to replace the Luther rose. Elements of this logo are incorporated in the current logo of ReconcilingWorks. Broin also created the logo for the RIC program.

In 1983, the Internal Revenue Service recognized LC/NA as a Section 501(c)(3) nonprofit organization.

A January 2005 report issued by the ELCA's Task Force for ELCA Studies on Sexuality suggests that the group's stance represents a minority position among those who responded to a survey, but one that garners a sizable constituency in support. After collecting opinions from primarily lay members in 2004 (using non-scientific, non-random sampling methods), the Task Force concluded that "a majority of the respondents to the study do not wish to change our traditional position," while noting that "a significant minority wants us to either 1) bless same-sex unions and admit people in such unions into the rostered ministries of the ELCA or 2) allow for pastoral discretion in the blessing of same-sex unions and make an accommodation by allowing for some form of exception or local option to admit people in such unions to the rostered ministries of the ELCA."

Out of approximately 4,000 respondents, 57 percent opposed blessing and rostering, 22.1 percent favored blessing and rostering, and 20.8 percent favored either an (unspecified) alternative, a delay in decision, or expressed no opinion. The results varied widely by age: younger respondents were more likely than older respondents to support blessing and rostering, with 42.7 percent in favor and 27 percent opposed among respondents 24 and under, and 17.7 percent in favor and 65.5 percent opposed among respondents age 65 or older. The approximately 4,000 respondents represented 0.08 percent of the total population of the ELCA, which stood at about 4.8 million at the time of the survey.

At the ELCA's churchwide assembly held in Chicago in August 2007, about 44% of the assembly's voting members voted to consider a resolution calling for the ELCA to revise its policies to allow for the rostering of ministers in same-gender relationships.

On June 12, 2012, Lutherans Concerned/North America changed its name to ReconcilingWorks.

== Reconciling in Christ program ==
Through its Reconciling in Christ (RIC) program, the organization recognizes congregations and Lutheran organizations that declare themselves welcoming to all people, regardless of sexual orientation or gender identity.

In 2025, it has 1,198 churches, 2 universities and 5 seminaries in the United States and Canada.

== Beliefs ==
=== Marriage ===
The network support blessings of same-sex marriage.

== See also ==
- List of Christian denominations affirming LGBTQ people
- Reconciling Ministries Network, a similar organization within the United Methodist Church
