= Progressive Baptists =

Baptist Progressive Christian movement

Progressive Baptists are a Baptist Progressive Christian movement particularly committed to social justice in the Church and in society. These commitments include defending freedom of religion, rights of indigenous peoples, the African American Rights, women's rights and LGBTQ rights.

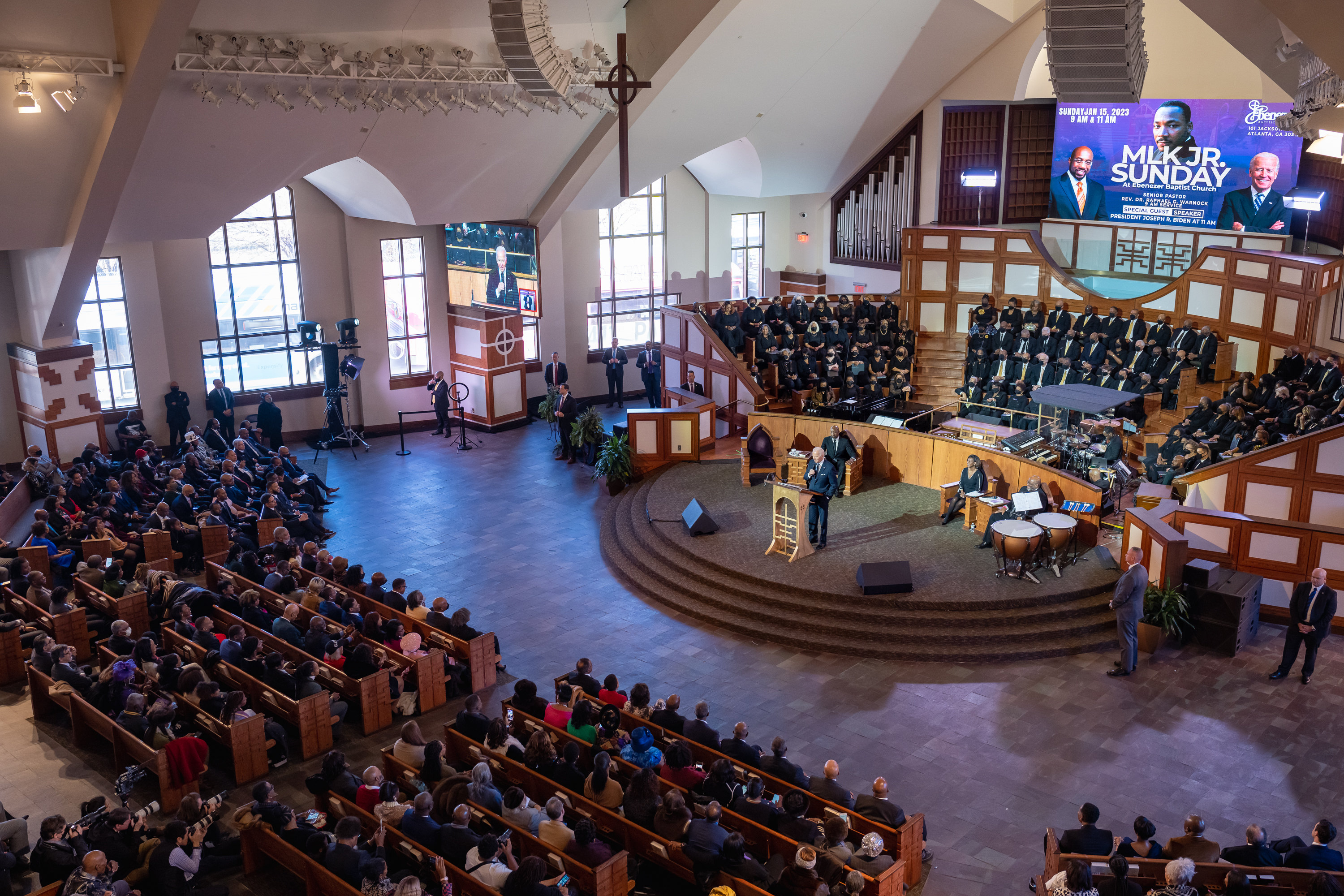
Service at Ebenezer Baptist Church in Atlanta, USA, affiliated with the Progressive National Baptist Convention.

== History ==
=== Freedom of religion and Indigenous rights ===
In 1612, Baptist minister Thomas Helwys published A Short Declaration of the Mystery of Iniquity, a plea for freedom of religion in England. In 1635, Baptist minister Roger Williams was thus banished from Massachusetts for his positions in favor of separation of church and state, freedom of religion and Indigenous rights, which led him into conflicts with the colony's pastors and magistrates. He bought land from the Native Americans and founded the city of Providence in 1636, as well as the Rhode Island, where he became governor. In 1657, he welcomed Quakers suffering religious persecution in Massachusetts.

=== African Americans rights ===
Many Baptist leaders were involved in abolitionism in the United States of the 19th century. In 1843, abolitionist Baptist pastors of Massachusetts met at Boston Tremont Temple and founded the American and Foreign Mission Society in opposition to slavery in the South. In 1872, the Society merged with the American Baptist Missionary Union of the American Baptist Churches USA. In 1957, Baptist leaders led by pastor Martin Luther King Jr. founded the Southern Christian Leadership Conference at Ebenezer Baptist Church of Atlanta for African Americans rights and the end of racial segregation in the United States.

=== Women's rights ===
In 1815, a Free Baptist Church in New England ordained the first Baptist woman minister, Clarissa Danforth. In 1900, Nannie Helen Burroughs founded the Women's Convention of the National Baptist Convention, USA and campaigned for women's rights, such as women in the workforce and right to vote. In 1965, the American Baptist Churches USA adopted a resolution affirming gender equality and the ordination of women in churches.

=== Rights of LGBTQ people ===
In May 1972, members of the American Baptist Churches USA founded American Baptists Concerned for Sexual Minorities and campaigned for LGBTQ rights. In 1978, President Jimmy Carter, also a deacon of the First Baptist Church of Washington, D.C. (American Baptist Churches USA), urged California voters to reject the Briggs Initiative, aimed at banning LGBTQ people from teaching in public schools. In 1992, Pullen Memorial Baptist Church in Raleigh, North Carolina, celebrated the first blessing of same-sex union in a Baptist Church. In 1993, members of the American Baptist Churches USA founded the Association of Welcoming and Affirming Baptists in San Jose, California. (The Association of Welcoming and Affirming Baptists merged with the Affirming Network of the Cooperative Baptist Fellowship in 2024.) In 1996, Lakeshore Avenue Baptist Church in Oakland, California ordained the first openly gay Baptist minister, Randle R. Mixon. In 2004, Coretta Scott King, founder of the Martin Luther King Jr. Center for Nonviolent Social Change, affirms her support for same-sex marriage at an academic conference at Richard Stockton College of New Jersey. In November 2022, Eastern University in St. Davids, Pennsylvania affiliated with the American Baptist Churches USA, added sexual orientation to its anti-discrimination policy, allowing the hiring of openly LGBTQ employees.
