= Alliance of Baptists =

American Christian denomination (1987–)

- Classification: Protestantism
- Theology: Progressive Baptist
- Headquarters: Raleigh, North Carolina, United States
- Origin: 1987
- Congregations: 140
- Members: 4,500
- Official website: allianceofbaptists.org

The Alliance of Baptists is a progressive Baptist Christian denomination in the United States and Canada. The headquarters is in Raleigh, North Carolina.

== History ==
The Alliance of Baptists was formed in 1987 as the Southern Baptist Alliance by liberal individuals and congregations who were considering separating from the Southern Baptist Convention as a result of the conservative resurgence/fundamentalist takeover controversy.

== Statistics ==
According to an association census released in 2022, it has 140 churches and 4,500 baptized members.

== Beliefs ==
In 1990, the Alliance became the first Baptist organization based in the Southern United States to formally offer an apology for slavery in the American South.

The Alliance of Baptists has emphasized women's ministry, encouraging women to seek ordination and senior pastorates.

In 2004 the Alliance published a statement on same-sex marriage, specifically opposing “amendments to the Constitution of the United States and state constitutions that would enshrine discrimination against sexual minorities and define marriage in such a way as to deny same-sex couples a legal framework in which to provide for one another and those entrusted to their care.”

In 2014, the Alliance joined a lawsuit challenging North Carolina's ban on same-sex marriage, which is America's first faith-based challenge to same-sex marriage bans.

The Alliance has also worked to uphold the separation of church and state through its membership and support of the Baptist Joint Committee for Religious Liberty. In 2019, the Alliance joined with 42 other religious and allied organizations in issuing a statement opposing Project Blitz, an effort by a coalition of Christian right organizations to influence state legislation.

== Organization ==
The Alliance of Baptists is governed by a board of directors and four officers—President, Vice-President, Treasurer, and Secretary—in between the Alliance's Annual Meetings. All actions of the Board of Directors are subject to review during the Annual Meeting. The 23-member board of directors and the officers are nominated by the Nominating Committee and elected at the Annual Meeting. Board members serve three-year terms and can be reelected. The board of directors has an Executive Committee which oversees the work of the Alliance in between meetings of the board. Membership in the Alliance is open to churches and individuals who support its Covenant and Mission and contribute financially to its ministries.
