= Evangelical Catholic Church (Independent Catholic) =

- Type: Catholic
- Classification: Independent Catholic
- Orientation: Evangelical Catholic
- Bishop: James Alan Wilkowski
- Origin: July 7, 1997; Chicago, Illinois
- Separated from: Roman Catholic Church
- Separations: North American Catholic Ecumenical Church
- Congregations: 4
- Members: 1,500
- Other name(s): Independent Evangelical Catholic Church in America
- Official website: evangelicalcatholicchurch.org

The Evangelical Catholic Church (ECC), formerly known as the Independent Evangelical Catholic Church in America (IECCA), is an Independent Catholic church headquartered in Chicago, Illinois. Founded in 1997, it claimed about 1,500 members in three parishes in 2014. In 2017, the ECC claimed four parishes in Chicago, Illinois; Bend, Oregon; Providence, Rhode Island; and Watertown, Wisconsin.

The Evangelical Catholic Church professes two creeds: the Apostles' Creed and the Nicene Creed. Its theology differs from that of the Roman Catholic Church in that it permits both men and women, married as well as unmarried, to become deacons, priests and bishops; accepts gay marriage; encourages divorced and remarried worshipers to receive Communion; and allows birth control.
