= Side A, Side B, Side X, Side Y =

Christian theological positions on homosexuality

Sides A, B, X, and Y are labels used for theological positions on homosexuality within some Christian churches and communities. In general, those who affirm same-sex marriage fall under "Side A", while those who do not affirm it are classified as "Side B", "Side X", or "Side Y". The letters A and B have been suggested to refer to the two sides of a phonograph record.

While differing in their views on same-sex marriage, the four groups often address issues affecting the LGBTQ community. Side A and Side B generally oppose conversion therapy and accept LGBTQ identification, including the term "gay Christian". Side X generally affirms the pursuit of exclusive heterosexuality and supports the ex-gay movement. Side Y claims to be opposed to identity politics and affirms Christian regeneration as the primary form of transformation.

There are no standardized definitions for the four positions, and individuals do not always identify with these labels. Some, particularly those associated with Side Y, may prefer terms such as "Bible-believing Christian" or "eunuch for the kingdom of God".

== Side A (affirming) ==
Many LGBTQ-affirming churches align with the perspective known as Side A and may describe themselves using terms such as affirming or welcoming or inclusive. This view generally holds that monogamous same-sex relationships are morally equivalent to heterosexual relationships.

Side A affirms same-sex monogamy and maintains that refraining from same-sex relationships can be psychologically or spiritually harmful for people with non-heterosexual attractions. Some proponents regard same-sex attraction as a natural or God-given characteristic and view same-sex marriages within a committed context as consistent with divine blessing.

Public figures who have expressed Side A views include Rob Bell, who states,

I am for marriage. I am for fidelity. I am for love, whether it's a man and woman, a woman and a woman, a man and a man. I think the ship has sailed and I think the church needs—I think this is the world we are living in and we need to affirm people wherever they are.

Some international networks of churches support blessing same-sex marriage, such the Association of Welcoming and Affirming Baptists, Ecumenical Catholic Church, Metropolitan Community Church, Reconciling Ministries Network (Methodist), The Covenant Network (Pentecostal). Other organizations include OneBodyOneFaith in the UK, and Affirming Christian Fellowship and Q Christian Fellowship in the US.

=== Progressive theology ===
Some individuals within Side A identify as progressive Christians and often hold theological positions that differ from those of conservative Christianity, such as approaching doctrinal claims in a non-literal or flexible manner or focusing on the humanitarian aspects of Jesus and the Bible rather than on its historicity. In One Faith No Longer, George Yancey and Ashlee Quosigk observe,

. . . progressive Christians tie much of their ideology to humanistic rationality and a desire for social justice.

Side A adherents may interpret the Bible through postmodern or progressive frameworks such as queer theology. Passages traditionally cited as condemning homosexuality, such as the account of Sodom and Gomorrah, are often understood within this perspective as not referring to modern same-sex committed relationships. Resources reflecting Side A perspectives include The Reformation Project, founded by Matthew Vines. Vines writes,

If the essence of marriage involves a covenant-keeping relationship of mutual self-giving, then two men and two women can fulfill that purpose as well as a man and a woman can.

Critics argue that such a view on marriage and gender is theologically revisionistic, pointing to its reliance on extrabiblical values and incompatibility with long-established Christian doctrines such as biblical inerrancy, bridal theology, gender complementarity, and marriage as a heterosexually gendered institution.

Notable proponents of Side A include Matthew Vines, Justin Lee, and Randy Thomas.

== Side B (chaste vocations) ==
The Side B position opposes same-sex marriage. It maintains that queer-identifying Christians should pursue a “positive vocation” for their lives. Advocates of the Side B position state that all Christians are called to chaste vocations—defined as a specific form of sexual faithfulness and integrity through celibacy or a monogamous relationship with a spouse of the opposite sex. Some Side B Christians enter heterosexual marriages despite experiencing same-sex attraction (often referred to as mixed-orientation marriages). Others remain celibate, sometimes in singleness, sometimes in committed same-sex celibate partnerships, or living in intentional community.

The term “Side B” was first explicitly outlined in 2010 by Episcopal priest Wesley Hill.

=== Spiritual Friendship ===
Some proponents address the belief that marriage and sexual relationships are the primary or exclusive forms of deep commitment by referencing biblical examples, interpreting relationships like that of David and Jonathan and Ruth and Naomi as models of nonmarital, nonsexual commitment between people of the same sex. Spiritual friendship is presented as an alternative for cultivating deep relational bonds without entering a same-sex marriage. Hill, in his book Spiritual Friendship, describes such relationships this way:

What [monk] Aelred called "spiritual friendship" was a form of same-sex intimacy that sublimated or transmuted erotic passion rather than sanctioning its genital expression. . . Aelred promoted an intimacy between friends that wasn't simply reducible to romantic love. But neither did he envision anything less than brotherhood.

=== Context-based LGBT labels ===
Views on language around sexual orientation vary among Side B proponents. Some, such as TJ Espinoza and David Frank of the New Kinship Podcast, identify as “queer” and “non-straight", respectively, with Espinoza emphasizing that he uses terms like “queer” to describe his sexuality rather than his personal identity, in order to maintain distance between the two. Others, including Rachel Gilson, author of Born Again This Way, may use terms like gay or lesbian to describe people but avoid them as identity labels, citing concerns that such terms may be interpreted as indicating approval of same-sex relationships.

Mark Yarhouse and Olya Zaporozhets, in Costly Obedience, note that some celibate gay-identifying Christians use the label “gay Christian” for accessibility and simplicity. Side B proponents often describe identity language choices as pragmatic, shaped by personal or contextual considerations. Proctor has described queer identity, in the Side B context, as a way to communicate one's experiences and desires.

Some celibate LGBTQ-identifying Christians have criticized the term “Side B” as too narrow to capture the diversity of perspectives on sex, sexuality, gender, and marriage, and as divisive to their communities. Supporters of the term argue that it is necessary to differentiate their position from the ex-gay (Side X) approach. Others, such as Preston Sprinkle, disagree with the celibate partnership aspect of Side B but embrace the use of LGBTQ labels (such as "gay", "straight", "lesbian", and "trans") as identity markers. On accommodating such terms, Sprinkle writes,

I can either, in this shared social space, force my worldview and my language that reflects my worldview, which I think is correct; ... I could either force ... that on somebody else and demand that they use language that reflects my worldview, or I can accommodate to their use of language. ... And so yeah, I'm going to step in, and out of an accommodation to where this person is currently at in their journey, I'm going to use the pronouns, because they actually do factually match their gender identity. I can disagree whether pronouns should resonate with gender identity. I can disagree with gender identity as a philosophical concept, which—I've got many problems with that. And I would tease it. ... So it's not about agreement or disagreement. So I'm going to accommodate, given the flexibility of language, the complexity of language, a shared social space, not because I agree with what they're saying.

Some criticize Side B's affirmation of LGBTQ identity, viewing it as incompatible with biblical teachings on sexuality, duplicitous, revisionistic in its view of the Fall of man and of platonic same-sex intimacy in the Bible (David and Jonathan, Jesus and John, etc.), and as enabling of rebellion against the creation ordinance, and as a subtle compromise on sin. For example, author Rosaria Butterfield, argues that Christians must recognize that the cultural purpose behind LGBTQ labeling is not a request for tolerance of differences anymore but one for affirmation of worldview, due to institutional changes:

The problem is that after Obergefell and after the Dignitary Harm Clause, what used to be terminology—I call you by a new name, I call you by a different pronoun; it’s just in the synonym finder and it’s all on the same level—now it’s no longer terminology, but it’s ideology.

Critics also censure Side B's denial that temptation can be sinful, viewing it as a misinterpretation of James 1. They similarly accuse the Side B approach of syncretizing Freudian and atheistic anthropology (namely, in affirming all romantic attractions as morally neutral) with Christianity and misinterpreting Romans 1.

Supporters of the Side B approach state that their aim is to present alternatives to progressive sexual ethics and to provide visibility for Christians with LGBTQ experiences who adhere to their understanding of biblical sexual ethics. Resources reflecting Side B perspectives include the Life on Side B Podcast, founded by Josh Proctor, Center for Faith, Sexuality, and Gender, founded by Preston Sprinkle, and Revoice, a community network.

== Side X (orientation change) ==
Side X derives its name from the term "ex-gay". The position generally regard sexual orientation change efforts as an ideal or positive treatment for people with non-heterosexual attractions. Some Side X perspectives pathologize the development of same-sex attraction to factors such as unmet childhood needs, including experiences of shame from a same-sex parent, overidentification with an opposite-sex parent, or a temperamentally based disidentification with a same-sex parent. Figures associated with Side X include Joseph Nicolosi and Joe Dallas.

Among the four “Sides” frameworks, Side X combines conservative Christianity with conversion therapy and heteronormativity. Comparisons have been drawn to organizations with Islamic (StraightWay Foundation) and Orthodox Jewish (JONAH) affiliations.

=== Trauma treatment ===
Proponents of what is called reintegrative therapy—sometimes associated with Side X—describe it as a form of trauma treatment that may or may not result in changes in sexual orientation. Such approaches often employ methods based on concepts including sexual fluidity, neuroplasticity, and eye movement desensitization and reprocessing. Critics of reintegrative therapy argue that ideological motivations play a significant role among both practitioners and clients. Supporters counter that such criticisms are also ideologically driven, and they contend that mainstream psychological research contains secular biases against religious clients and therapists, over and against factors such as peer influence, family pathology, sexual abuse, media influence, and obsessionally compulsive introspection in regard to sexuality (sometimes called HOCD, or homosexual OCD).

Reintegrative therapists often distinguish their methods from conversion therapy, sometimes characterizing that term as ideologically charged and pointing to statistical analyses in support of their own treatment models. Advocates of reintegrative therapy include Joseph Nicolosi Jr. and Michael Gasparro. In Human Sexual Orientation: The Biologic Theories Reappraised, William Byne and Bruce Parsons argue that the role of agency is often missing from discussions about sexual identity. Douglas Abbott, in WHAT IF I DON’T CHANGE?, writes,

Biological theory suggests that a force of nature (genes or prenatal hormones) causes homosexuality, and environmental theories posit that social experiences (e.g., unhealthy parent-child interaction and/or sexual abuse) push the individual into same-sex behavior. But little is said by either theoretical camp about the person's own active participation in sexual preference development. . . . [A]s social scientists, we have an obligation to explore the role of choice in sexual identity development.

Individuals with theologically conservative Christian beliefs often align with the Side X position, which shares several views with Side Y. Consequently, some individuals identify with both Sides X and Y. Shared characteristics between these positions may include:

- Use of terms such as "unwanted same-sex attraction” to describe homoerotic or homoromantic desires.
- Use of terms such as "gender-anxious", "gender confusion", or "transgender identity" to refer to gender dysphoria.
- Rejection of sexual orientation categories (e.g., gay, bisexual, straight) as identity labels.
- Rejection of gender identity categories (e.g., cisgender, transgender, non-binary) as identity labels.
- Occasional use of labels such as ex-gay or former transgender to describe previous involvement in LGBTQ sexuality, identity, or activism prior to conversion to Christianity.

== Side Y (new identity) ==
Side Y is also opposed to same-sex marriage. It teaches that all Christians, regardless of sexual attractions, should repent of sin and live by what proponents describe as "holy sexuality", characterized by chastity in singleness and faithfulness in marriage. This view is found in many theologically conservative Christian traditions that affirm complementarianism and federal headship.

Notable individuals associated with Side Y include Rosaria Butterfield, Christopher Yuan, and Becket Cook. Resources reflecting Side Y perspectives include The New Reformation Catechism on Human Sexuality by Christopher Gordon and The Holy Sexuality Project, a video curriculum by Christopher Yuan.

The term “Side Y” appears to have been used as early as 2016 by Gabriel Blanchard (“Mudblood Catholic”), who has stated that he coined it to describe a position emphasizing one's identity in Christ and renunciation of a sexual orientation-based identity. Some associated with this position reject the Side Y label and the “Sides” framework altogether, stating that such terms imply equal validity among the four positions (A, B, X, and Y).

=== Reformed theology ===
Many beliefs associated with Side Y are connected to Reformed doctrines, such as God's sovereignty, original sin, imputed righteousness, total depravity, union with Christ, and Christian regeneration.

Side Y also generally maintains that the Bible is divinely inspired and without error, and often emphasizes precise language use to align with its theological anthropology. Many adherents reject descriptors such as “gay Christian” or “sexual minority", viewing them as inconsistent with biblical categories. They may instead use terms such as “Christian who experiences same-sex attraction” and avoid identity labels drawn from sexual orientation. Former gay rights activist Rosaria Butterfield states,

Adjectives in terms of grammar are modifiers; their job is to tell me what kind of Christian you are. The problem with a term like "gay Christian" is that it modifies Christian according to a category of the flesh (earthly, unregenerate nature).

=== Concupiscence as sin ===
Side Y typically regards same-sex attraction as a form of indwelling sin and often adopts the Augustinian view that concupiscence—desire for what God forbids—is itself sinful, whether or not it is acted upon. Rosaria Butterfield describes unchosen sin this way:

Side B gay Christianity says, "No, no, no, it's not a sin if you didn't choose it; it's not a sin if you're not physically acting on it." But that makes no sense because in order to actually pull that off, you have to throw away the tenth commandment (Exodus 20:17)... That says, "Thou shalt not covet thy neighbor's wife," not "Thou shalt not take thy neighbor's wife." Coveting is about a desire that's not acted upon. ... And then in Romans 7, you have probably the most majestic words in the Bible understanding indwelling sin, where Paul says, "Why do I do what I don't want to do? It is not I; it is sin in me." So there Paul is saying, "it's sin; it's in me; and I didn't choose it."

In contrast to the Roman Catholic view, which holds that unchosen resistance toward God's standard of morality is not inherently sinful, Side Y claims that though one may not have actively willed to sin, one can still be guilty of the internal pull toward the sin. Therefore, they believe that Christians, by being rooted in scripture, must resist their sin (in whatever form it manifests itself) and starve their indwelling sin, such as the romantic desire for the same sex.

Because Side Y does not see marriage as a biblical mandate for every single Christian, Side Y Christians do not believe that all people must become heterosexual upon conversion. At the same time, many also see complementarian marriage as a calling and option for some, and may, in those instances, positively affirm such individuals' desires to enter into a heterosexual marriage. Side Y also sees lifelong singleness as an equally valuable calling, citing the examples of biblical chastity, including that of Jesus and the Apostle Paul.

Despite such an acknowledgement, many theologically conservative Christians simultaneously maintain that lifelong singleness is not the normative path for the majority. They cite the three exchanges in Romans 1 (the truth for lies, Creator for the creature, and the natural for the unnatural) to assert that a culture increasingly barren and deficient of heteronormativity is a sign of divine judgment, and that its concomitant promotion of singleness and childlessness stands in direct opposition to God's design for procreative flourishing. In particular, Rosaria Butterfield states,

And let's be clear: a world that grows in singleness and homosexuality is under judgment. ... So if you have a theology that helps people grow in their homosexuality or their singleness, you are actually promoting a theology that brings the Church under judgment.

Mindful of the modern perception that singleness dooms one to loneliness and obscurity, those on Side Y often stress that Christians who do not struggle with same-sex attraction have a responsibility to become the new family promised by Christ to those who leave their LGBT family. Side Y Christians also often seek to dignify the calling of singleness. In his book 7 Myths About Singleness, Sam Allberry writes,

If marriage shows us the shape of the gospel, singleness shows us [the gospel's] sufficiency.

Rosaria Butterfield emphasizes that Christians who do not struggle with same-sex attraction should not pressure individuals to get married and clarifies that "the solution for all sin is repentance". In 2016, she spoke at Liberty University, saying that although God does not promise to take away temptation in this life, God "pledges to you His kind company and power in the midst of this struggle" and will carry "the heavier part of the cross". Butterfield describes each person who battles unchosen same-sex attraction in "God's way" as "a hero of the faith". At the same time, she also warns that the false expectation that same-sex desires always fade away completely can make people blame God and become bitter.

Since 2014, many associated with such perspectives have criticized, in particular, Sam Allberry (and his organization Living Out), Jackie Hill Perry, Cru, The Gospel Coalition, Christianity Today, and the broad evangelical world (BigEva) for compromising with Side B by teaching that same-sex attraction is not a sin and affirming orientation language and its anthropological framework (example: same-sex attracted pastor, gay person, the "How biblically inclusive is your church?" audit, etc).

=== Against gay Christianity ===
People on Side Y tend to practice intentionality in their word choice and thus reject words like "gay", "queer", and "LGBT", as identity markers. If they are same-sex attracted, they may opt for descriptors like "Christian who struggles with (unwanted) same-sex attractions". To describe their pre-Christian selves, they may allow for phrases like "gay identity" or "life as a lesbian", but then use explicitly biblical terms like "born again", "eunuch for the kingdom of God", or simply "Christian single", to characterize their current selves. Side Y's insistence on such terms comes from a commitment to a biblical anthropology and ontology, which they deem inconsistent with the worldview implications that, according to them, come with identifying as gay.

Unlike Side B, which provides room for a nonmarital commitment in same-sex friendships (sometimes called "Spiritual Friendship"), Side Y tends to see such unions as an appropriation of marriage and misuse of friendship. Christopher Yuan, the author of Holy Sexuality and the Gospel, states,

"[Lifelong same-sex partnership] is a ceremony: [The participants] covenant together, they live together, they own property together; it's from every other [angle], same-sex marriage".

Some also fault Side B for being informed by a Darwinian and atheistic view of humanity, rather than by that of the Bible and Christianity. Others have also spoken against the Revoice movement for denying homoerotic desire as a fallen desire and presenting it as morally neutral and presupposing an intersectional identitarianism and "gender ideology". Because of these worldview differences, there is a growing movement among Side Y Christians toward viewing gay Christianity as a different religion altogether.

== See also ==
- Biblical law in Christianity – Legal aspects of the Bible
- Christian psychology – Aspect of psychology adhering to the religion of Christianity
- Christianity and sexual orientation
- Danvers Statement – Statement of the complementarian Christian view of gender roles
- Eisegesis – Interpreting text as to introduce one's own presuppositions
- Homophobia#Internalized – Negative attitudes towards homosexual people
- Homosexuality in the New Testament
- Law and gospel – Topic in Christian theology
- Mixed-orientation marriage – Marriage between partners of differing sexual orientations
- Union with Christ – Relationship between the believer and Jesus Christ
