= Tushnet =

Tushnet (/ˈtʌʃnɛt/ TUSH-net) is a surname. Notable people with the surname include:

- Eve Tushnet (born 1978), American Catholic author and blogger
- Mark Tushnet (born 1945), American legal scholar
- Rebecca Tushnet (born 1973), American legal scholar, daughter of Mark and sister of Eve
