= Rosaria Butterfield =

American writer (born 1962)

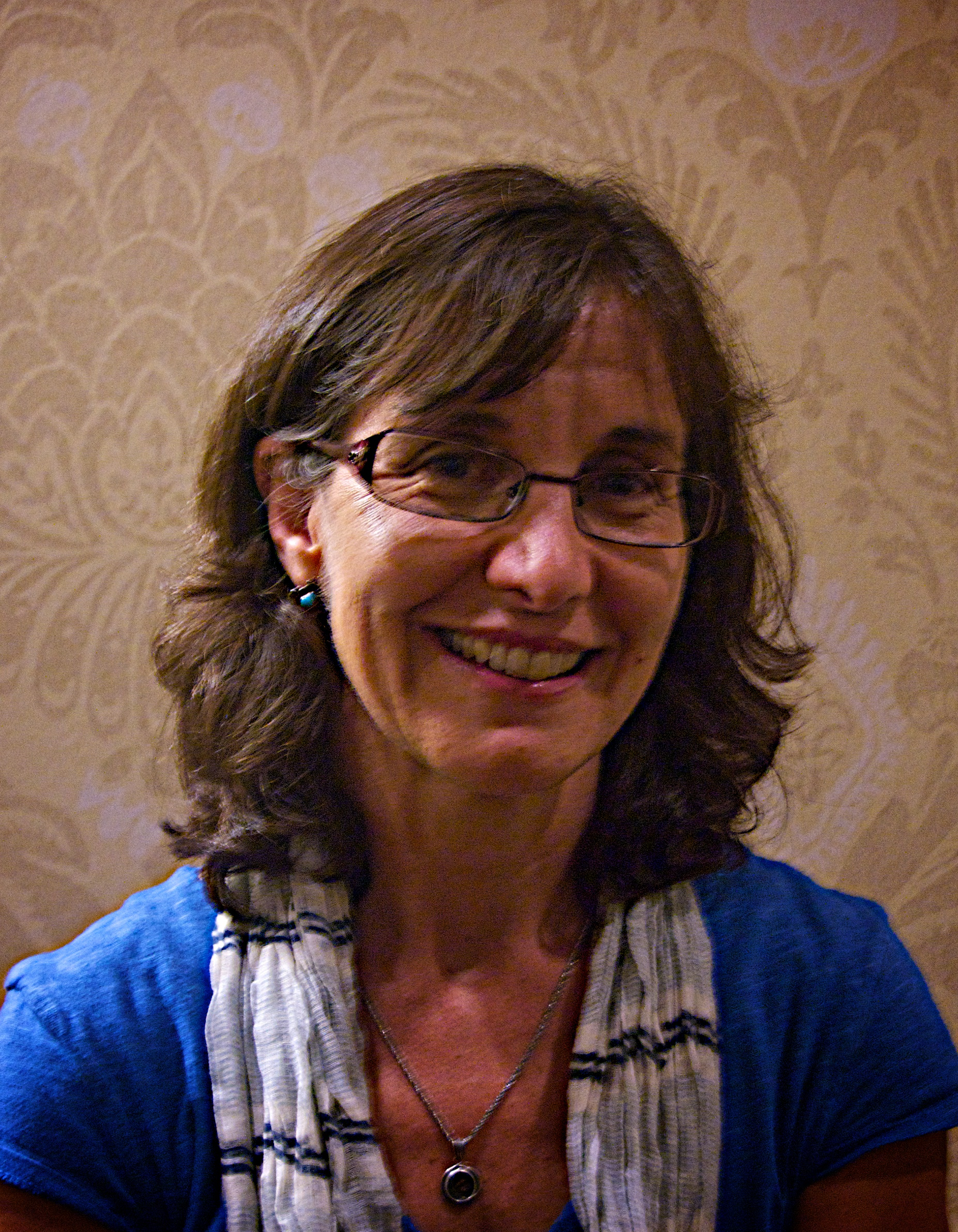
- Born: Rosaria Champagne Butterfield; 20 April 1962 (age 64)
- Education: Ohio State University (Ph.D.)
- Occupations: Writer, speaker
- Spouse: Kent Butterfield
- Writing career
- Notable work: The Secret Thoughts of an Unlikely Convert
- Website: rosariabutterfield.com

Rosaria Champagne Butterfield (born 1962) is an American author and former tenured professor of English at Syracuse University.

== Career ==
Growing up, Butterfield was raised Catholic and attended predominantly liberal Catholic schools. In her autobiography The Secret Thoughts of an Unlikely Convert: An English Professor's Journey into the Christian Faith, she details her transformation from a postmodernist into an evangelical Christian. For nearly a decade, she lived as an openly lesbian activist. While researching the Religious Right and their "politics of hatred" against the queer community, she wrote an article criticizing the evangelical organization Promise Keepers. Ken Smith, the then-pastor of the Syracuse Reformed Presbyterian Church, wrote to her regarding this article and invited her to dinner. Her subsequent friendship with the Smiths led to her re-evaluate her presuppositions. Two years later, Butterfield converted to evangelical Christianity. Following her conversion, she developed a ministry to college students. She now frequently speaks at churches and universities about her experience. She has taught and ministered at Geneva College. She now lives in Durham, North Carolina with her husband, Kent Butterfield, a pastor, and their children.

Butterfield, who earned her Ph.D. from the Ohio State University in English Literature, worked in the English Department and Women's Studies Program at Syracuse University from 1992 to 2002. During her academic career, she published the book The Politics of Survivorship: Incest, Women's Literature, and Feminist Theory as well as many scholarly articles. Her academic interest was focused on feminist theory, queer theory and 19th-century British literature. She was awarded tenure in 1999, the same year that she converted to Christianity. She married in 2001.

== Theological views ==
=== Hospitality ===
In many of her books and interviews, Butterfield highlights what she calls "radically ordinary" Christian hospitality. Having been a beneficiary of the practice herself, she writes, "To me, hospitality is the ground zero of the Christian faith." She differentiates this from entertaining guests, saying that "In counterfeit hospitality, there is a very fixed relationship between host and guest. In Christian hospitality, it's a very fluid relationship." In an interview, she has stated that "In the past, [Christians] have set [their boundaries] according to [their] checkbook and according to [their] calendar. In a post-Christian world, we are called to set them according to the blood of Christ." Butterfield encourages Christians "to get close enough to put the hand of the stranger into the hand of the Savior,” and that "it hurts, and it's good. And the Lord equips." In her book The Gospel Comes with a House Key, she indicates that her hospitality is "not showy or fancy" and that parting with the idols of consumerism and sexual autonomy is essential to making room for other people.

=== Repentance ===
One of the hallmarks of Butterfield's writing is the emphasis on repentance. She points to Puritans like Thomas Watson and John Owen, observing that the Puritans "knew how to hate their sin without hating themselves because they understood that Christ's grace is an ever-present Person, a Person who understands our situation and our needs better than we do." Her writing often delves into her personal journey with repentance, and the nature of sin as she has come to understand it. She devotes much time elaborating on the theology of original sin, describing it as a distorting influence on people that blinds them from seeing their true identities, which she deems are "image bearers of the holy God."

Butterfield also speaks of the necessity of daily repentance in the Christian life: "Our call is not to despair, but to hope in Christ and to drive a fresh nail into our choice sin every day." In her autobiography The Secret Thoughts of an Unlikely Convert, she writes,

". . .repentance requires greater intimacy with God than with our sin. How much greater? About the size of a mustard seed. Repentance requires that we draw near to Jesus, no matter what. And sometimes we all have to crawl there on our hands and knees."

Butterfield identifies repentance as "the threshold to God" and states that "good neighbors never put a stumbling block between a fellow image bearer and the God who made her." "If you love your neighbors," she writes, "you would never deny them this threshold."

Sometimes Butterfield describes repentance as "bittersweet business," seeing the Christian walk as a dying to self. She encourages Christians to embrace repentance, as it "proves only the obvious: that God was right all along.” In particular, she warns that "God calls any heart that is not submitted to Jesus sinful," and that sexual sin often transforms into a sin of identity.

=== Sexuality and identity ===
==== People as image bearers ====
Citing scripture such as Genesis 1:27, Butterfield argues that understanding that people are made in the image of God as male and female is key to understanding humanity correctly, especially during a time when there is a widespread acceptance of queer and transgender identities.

==== LGBT identities as false categories ====
As a former scholar of Freud and Marx, Butterfield repudiates the theological anthropology that she associates with the intersectionality framework, expressing that its implications clash with a biblical worldview. Consequently, Butterfield rejects sexual orientation as a valid category of personhood, considering it a "19th-century invention" and a "category mistake" that goes against biblical anthropology. Due to such positions, Butterfield sees categories like "gay Christian" and "trans Christian" as false constructs. She does not identify herself as "ex-gay" and believes that gay Christians should not identify as such.

==== LGBT-affirmation as complicity ====
Because Butterfield believes that Christian neighboring means not putting a stumbling block between a neighbor and God, she calls Christians to love their neighbors enough to speak the truth about sin. She also asserts that to support policies that codify sinful behavior into law is to believe that one is more merciful than God.

Likewise, she has chided the Side B movement, gay Christianity, and broader evangelicalism for treating labels like "LGBTQ+ person" and "trans person" as reliable descriptors and affirming sexual orientation as an ontologically accurate category.

==== Christian call to be family ====
Butterfield stresses the importance of Christians' becoming a true family and providing belonging to one another, especially to those who renounce their former way of life in the LGBT community to convert to Christianity. She has pointed out that the Church ought to abandon the idea that singles need to be fixed up. In her book The Gospel Comes with a House Key, Butterfield writes,

"Take, for example, our Christian brothers and sisters who struggle with unchosen homosexual desires and longings, sensibilities and affections, temptations and capacities. Our brothers and sisters need the church to function as the Lord has called it to—as a family. Because Christian conversion always comes in exchange for the life you once loved, not in addition to it, people have much to lose in coming to Christ—and some people have more to lose than others. Some people have one cross, and others have ten to carry. People who live daily with unchosen homosexual desires also live with a host of unanswered questions and unfulfilled life dreams. What is your responsibility to those brothers and sisters who are in this position in life?"

She refers to Mark 10:28-31 to demonstrate that the Church must become the new family promised by Christ for those who forsake their former loyalties and allegiances to follow him. According to Butterfield, Christians belong to one another and to one Father, and thereby get their identity and calling "from God's image radiating in and through [them]."

== Awards ==
Butterfield received the 2020 Boniface Award from the Association of Classical Christian Schools, given to recognize "a public figure who has stood faithfully for Christian truth, beauty, and goodness with grace."

== Publications ==
- Crimes of Reading: Incest and Censorship in Mary Shelley's Early Novels (Thesis, 1992)
- The Politics of Survivorship: Incest, Women's Literature, and Feminist Theory (1996)
- The Secret Thoughts of an Unlikely Convert: An English Professor's Journey into the Christian Faith (2012)
- Openness Unhindered: Further Thoughts of an Unlikely Convert on Sexual Identity and Union with Christ (2015)
- The Gospel Comes with a House Key: Practicing Radically Ordinary Hospitality in Our Post-Christian World (2018)
- Five Lies of Our Anti-Christian Age (2023)
