= Self-mortification =

Self-mortification may refer to:

== Voluntary pain or privation to oneself ==
- in religious practice generally, mortification of the flesh
  - Mortification (theology)
  - Mortification in Catholic theology

== Involuntary ==
- Sometimes used interchangeably with mortification of the self, personality disruption done to an individual in a total institution or a setting with similar characteristics
