= Christian views on homosexuality =

The Christian Cross

Symbols of homosexuality

Homosexuality has been the subject of much debate within Christianity. Christianity developed during the 1st century AD as a Jewish Christian sect and, as such, many of its views were rooted in Jewish teaching. As Christianity established itself as a separate religion, with its own scriptures, some views moved away from the Jewish roots while others remained firmly grounded in Jewish tradition. The traditional view within Christianity is that both the Jewish scriptures that became known as the Old Testament and passages within what became known as the New Testament make clear that same-sex sexual behavior is sinful – an interpretation supported by the writings of the Church Fathers, although Christian attitudes to homosexuality in society are changing.

Today, most denominations teach that homosexual acts are sinful, and both the Eastern Orthodox Church and the Catholic Church officially condemn homosexual activity as sin. Some mainly liberal or Progressive Christians denominations, churches and individuals hold views that differ from traditional interpretations and some of the mainline Protestant denominations around the world view same-sex behaviour as equally valid and allow clergy to perform same-sex marriages.

According to a 2020 study by the Williams Institute at the University of California, Los Angeles School of Law, there are 4.1 million LGBT American adults who identify as Christian, including 1.5 million Protestants, 1.3 million Roman Catholics, and 1.3 million Christians of other denominations.

== History ==
The Hebrew Bible and its traditional interpretations in Judaism and Christianity have historically affirmed and endorsed a patriarchal and heteronormative approach towards human sexuality, endorsing exclusively penetrative vaginal intercourse between men and women within the boundaries of marriage over all other forms of human sexual activity, including autoeroticism, masturbation, oral sex, non-penetrative and non-heterosexual sexual intercourse (all of which have been labeled as "sodomy" at various times).

They have believed and taught that such behaviors are forbidden because they are considered sinful, and further compared to or derived from the behavior of the alleged residents of Sodom and Gomorrah. However, the status of LGBTQ people in early Christianity is debated.

The history of Christianity and homosexuality has been much debated with these disagreements often concerning the translations of certain phrases, or the meaning and context of some biblical passages.

The extent to which the Bible mentions the subject, whether or not it is condemned, and whether the various passages apply today, have become contentious topics in the 20th and 21st centuries. Significant debate has arisen over the proper interpretation of the Levitical code; the narrative of Sodom and Gomorrah; and various Pauline passages which appear to condemn same-sex sexual activities.

== Christian denominational positions ==
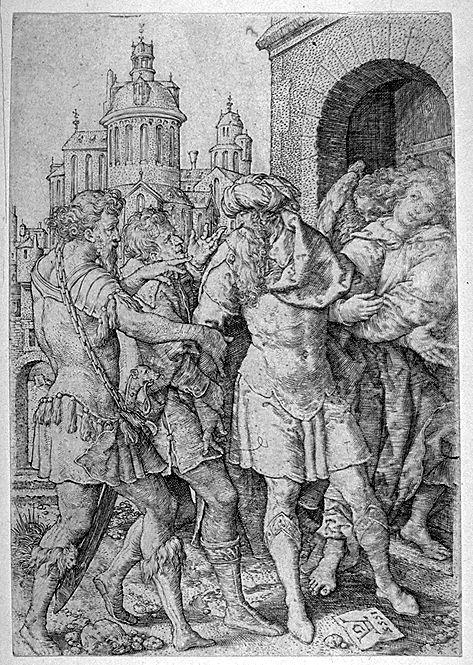
Lot prevents sodomites from raping the angels, Heinrich Aldegrever, 1555.

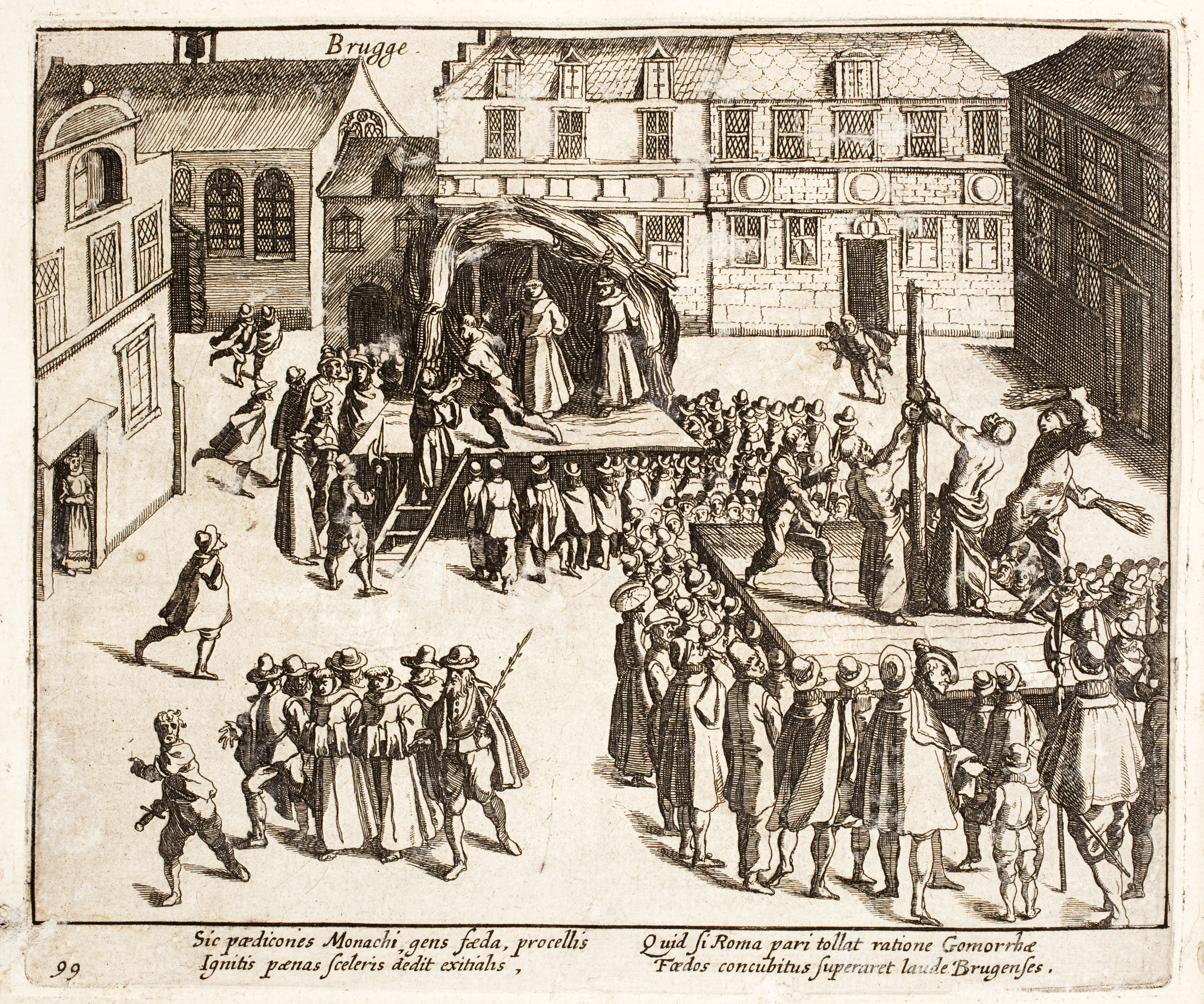
Execution by fire and torture of five homosexual Franciscan friars, Bruges, 26 July 1578.

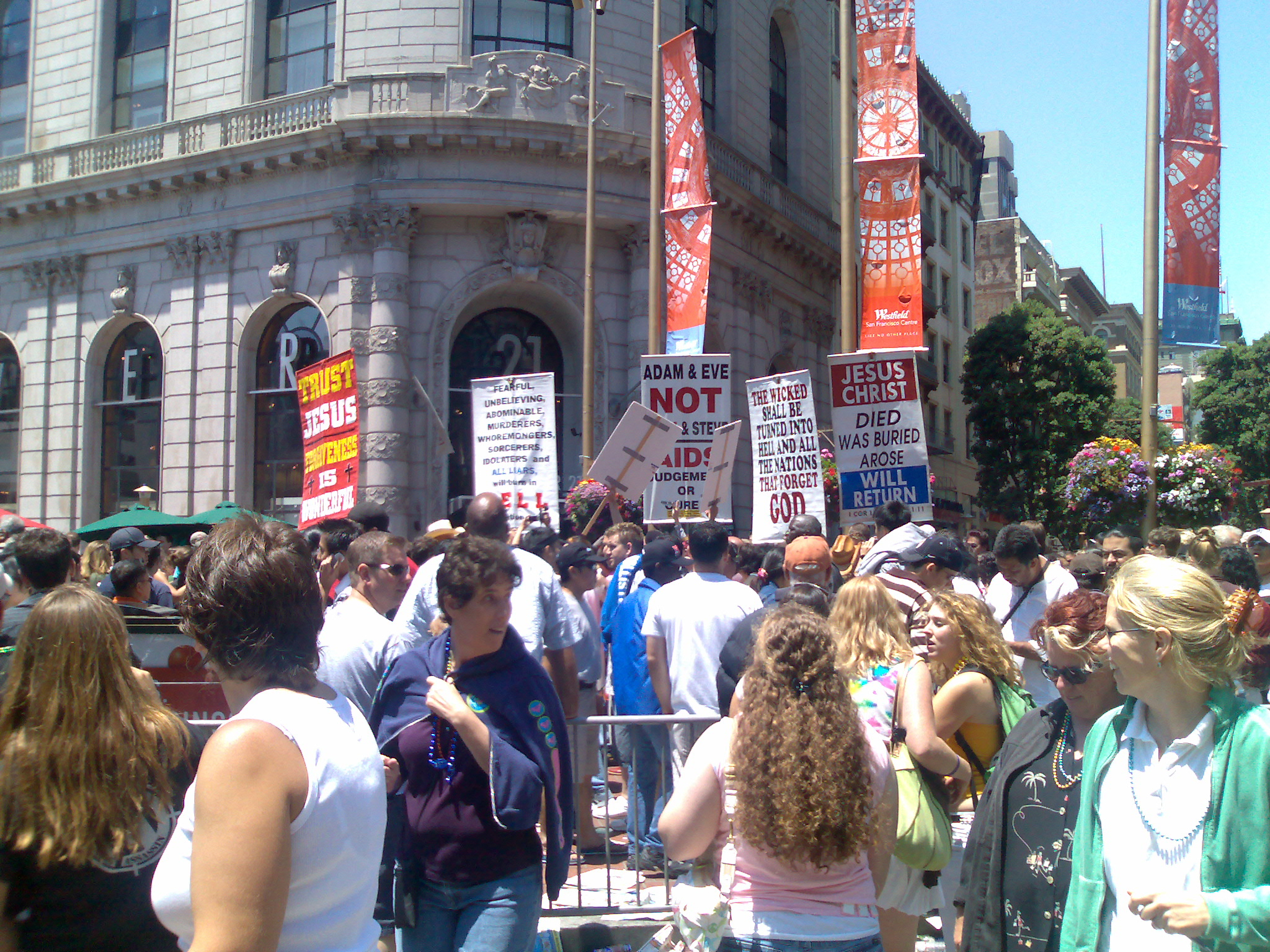
Christian protesters at a 2006 gay pride event in San Francisco.

=== Catholic Church ===
The Catholic Church views as sinful any sexual act not related to procreation by a couple joined in marriage. The Church states that "homosexual tendencies" are "objectively disordered", but does not consider the tendency itself to be sinful but rather a temptation toward sin.

The Catechism of the Catholic Church states that "men and women who have deep-seated homosexual tendencies [...] must be accepted with respect, compassion, and sensitivity" and that "every sign of unjust discrimination in their regard should be avoided." The Church opposes criminal penalties against homosexuality. The Catholic Church requires those who are attracted to people of the same (or opposite) sex to practise chastity, because it teaches that sexuality should only be practised within marriage, which includes chaste sex as permanent, procreative, heterosexual, and monogamous. The Vatican distinguishes between "deep-seated homosexual tendencies" and the "expression of a transitory problem", in relation to ordination to the priesthood; saying in a 2005 document that homosexual tendencies "must be clearly overcome at least three years before ordination to the diaconate."

A 2011 report based on telephone surveys of self-identified American Catholics conducted by the Public Religion Research Institute found that 56% believe that sexual relations between two people of the same sex are not sinful. Research indicates that the Catholic Church's teachings on sexual conduct are "a major source of conflict and distress" to LGBTQ Catholics.

In January 2018, German bishop Franz-Josef Bode of the Diocese of Osnabrück, and in February 2018 German Catholic cardinal Reinhard Marx, chairman of the German Bishops' Conference, said in interviews with German journalists that blessing of same-sex unions is possible in Catholic churches in Germany. In Austria blessing of same sex unions is performed in two churches located in the Roman Catholic Diocese of Linz. In 2021, the Congregation for the Doctrine of the Faith clarified that same-sex civil unions cannot be blessed.

On 11 March 2023, the Synodal Path with support of over 80 percentage of German Roman Catholic bishops allowed liturgical blessing ceremonies for same-sex unions in all 27 German Roman Catholic diocese. A similar decision had been taken a few months earlier by the Flemish bishops of the Episcopal Conference of Belgium. Both decisions received strong condemnation by the Holy See and by conservative Catholic clergy: Cardinal Pietro Parolin stated that the German bishops had no authority over the issue and Cardinal Wim Eijk urged Flemish bishops to withdraw their decision.

On 18 December 2023, non-liturgical blessings of same-sex couples in the document Fiducia supplicans were approved by Pope Francis and published by the Dicastery for the Doctrine of the Faith. However, "it is not a formal liturgical blessing and does not give the impression that the Catholic Church is blessing the union as if it were a marriage".

On April 4 2025, the Roman-Catholic bishop conference in Germany published after Fiducia supplicans by pope Francis a document, in which blessing ceremonies for same-sex unions are allowed. In the document are helping hints, which church songs or which biblicals texts can be used.

=== Orthodox churches ===
The Eastern Orthodox churches condemn homosexual acts. The Orthodox Church shares a long history of church teachings and canon law with the Catholic Church and has a similar conservative stance on homosexuality. Some Orthodox Church jurisdictions, such as the Orthodox Church in America, have taken the approach of welcoming people with "homosexual feelings and emotions", while encouraging them to work towards "overcoming its harmful effects in their lives", while not allowing the sacraments to people who seek to justify homosexual activity. Other Orthodox Churches, such as those in Eastern Europe and Greece, view homosexuality less favourably. The Greek Orthodox Archdiocese of America lists homosexuality (along with fornication, adultery, and more) as "immoral and inappropriate", based on a belief that homosexuality breaks up the institution of marriage and family. A 2017 Pew Research Center poll found that the majority of Orthodox Christians in the Eastern European and former USSR states surveyed believe that homosexuality "should not be accepted by society"; 45% of Orthodox Christians in Greece and 31% in the United States answered the same way.

In July 2022, Archbishop Elpidophoros of America baptized two babies adopted by clothing designers Evanggelos Bousis and Peter Dundas, making him the first Greek Orthodox bishop to baptize children adopted by gay couples. According to the metropolitan in whose diocese the baptism took place (Antonios of Glyfada), Elpidophoros did not inform him in advance that the baptism in question was to be performed for a gay couple. Metropolitan Antonios reported Elpidophoros to the Holy Synod of the Church of Greece, which issued a formal protest to both Elpidophoros and the Ecumenical Patriarchate of Constantinople.

=== Protestant churches ===
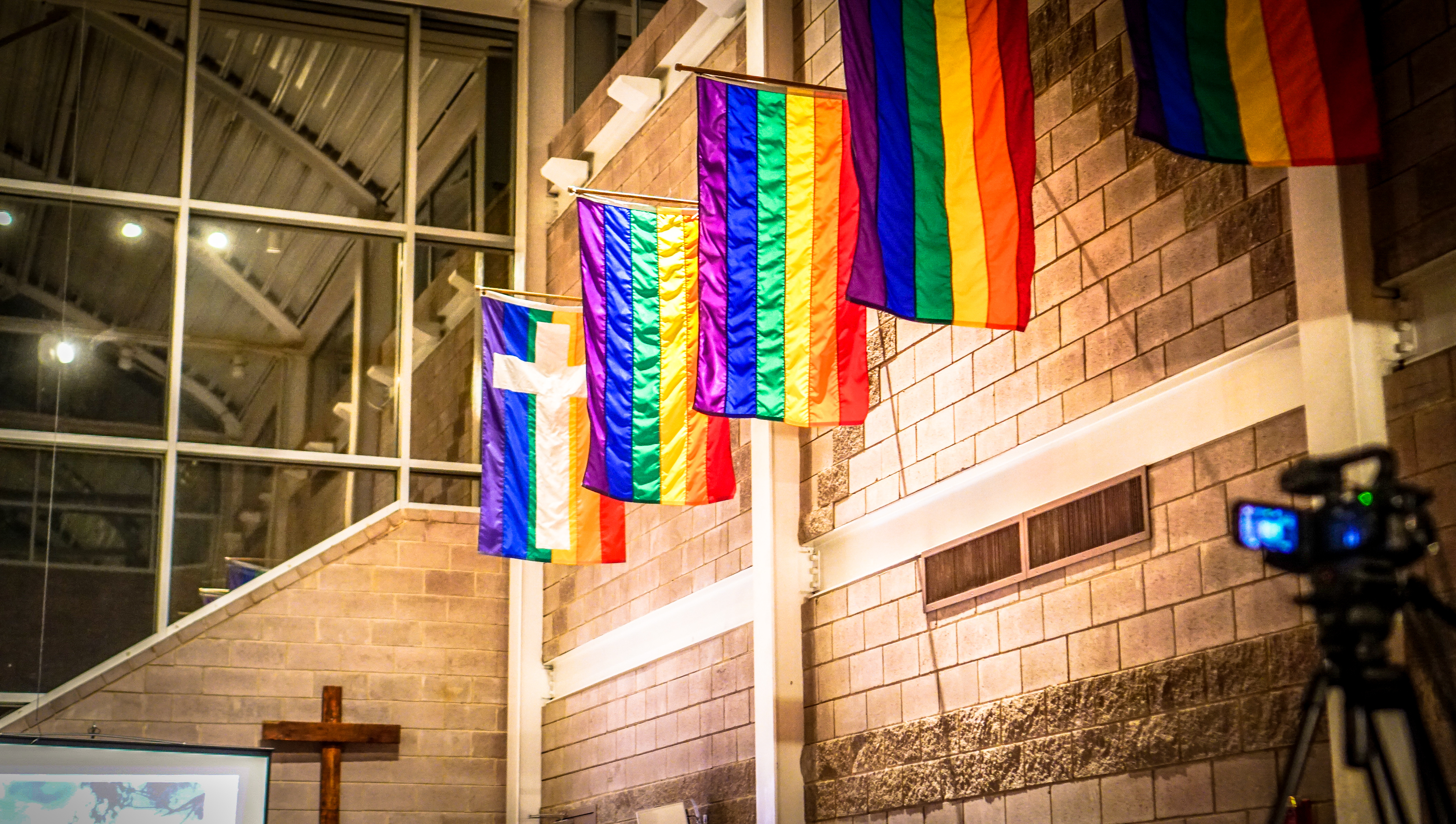
Christian pride flag hanging in a Metropolitan Community Church

==== Inclusive position ====
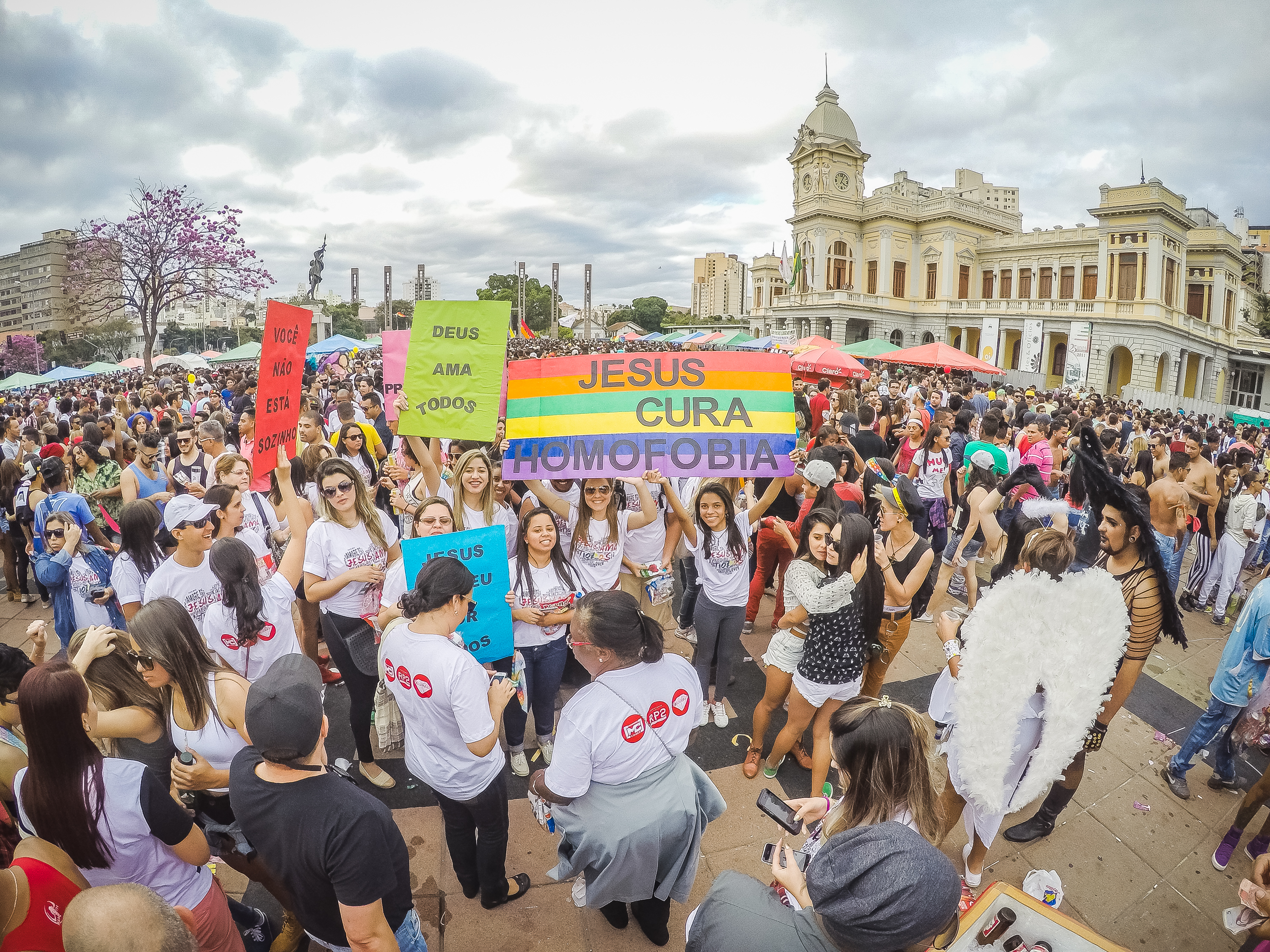
Signs reading "God loves everyone" and "Jesus heals homophobia" at the 2015 Belo Horizonte Pride Parade in Brazil.

Certain other Christian denominations do not view monogamous same-sex relationships as sinful or immoral, and may bless such unions and consider them marriages. These include the Episcopal Church, the United Church of Canada, the Presbyterian Church (USA), the United Church of Christ, all German Lutheran, reformed and united churches in EKD, all Swiss reformed churches, the Protestant Church in the Netherlands, the United Protestant Church in Belgium, the United Protestant Church of France, the Church of Denmark, the Church of Sweden, the Church of Iceland, the Church of Norway, and the Uniting Church in Australia. The Evangelical Lutheran Church of Finland also allows prayer for same-sex couples. The Metropolitan Community Church was founded specifically to serve the Christian LGBTQ community. The Global Alliance of Affirming Apostolic Pentecostals (GAAAP) traces its roots back to 1980, making it the oldest LGBT-affirming Apostolic Pentecostal denomination in existence. Another such organization is the Affirming Pentecostal Church International, currently the largest affirming Pentecostal organization, with churches in the US, UK, Central and South America, Europe and Africa.

LGBT-affirming denominations regard homosexuality as a natural occurrence. The Episcopal Church and United Church of Christ celebrate gay marriage, and some parts of the Anglican and Lutheran churches allow for the blessing of gay unions. The United Church of Canada also allows same-sex marriage, and views sexual orientation as a gift from God. Within the Anglican Communion, there are openly gay clergy; for example, The Episcopal Church has ordained a number of gay bishops since Gene Robinson in 2003. Within the Lutheran communion, there are openly gay clergy, too; for example, bishop Eva Brunne is an openly lesbian bishop in the Church of Sweden. Such religious groups and denominations interpret scripture and doctrine in a way that leads them to accept that homosexuality is morally acceptable, and a natural occurrence. For example, in 1988 the United Church of Canada, that country's largest Protestant denomination, affirmed that "a) All persons, regardless of their sexual orientation, who profess Jesus Christ and obedience to Him, are welcome to be or become full members of the Church; and b) All members of the Church are eligible to be considered for the Ordered Ministry." In 2000, the Church's General Assembly further affirmed that "human sexual orientations, whether heterosexual or homosexual, are a gift from God and part of the marvelous diversity of creation."

In addition, some Christian denominations such as the Moravian Church, believe that the Bible speaks negatively of homosexual acts but, as research on the matter continues, the Moravian Church seeks to establish a policy on homosexuality and the ordination of homosexuals. In 2014, Moravian Church in Europe allowed blessings of same-sex unions.

Liberal Quakers, those in membership of Britain Yearly Meeting and Friends General Conference in the US and some Conservative Quaker Yearly Meetings approve of same-sex marriage and union. Quakers were the first Christian group in the United Kingdom to advocate for equal marriage and Quakers in Britain formally recognised same-sex relationships in 1963.

The United Methodist Church elected a lesbian bishop in 2016, and on 7 May 2018, the Council of Bishops proposed the One Church Plan, which would allow individual pastors and regional church bodies to decide whether to ordain LGBTQ clergy and perform same-sex weddings. On 26 February 2019, a special session of the General Conference rejected the One Church Plan and voted to strengthen its official opposition to same-sex marriages and ordaining openly LGBTQ clergy. At the 2024 General Conference, 93% of delegates voted to lift existing bans on the ordination of LGBTQ+ people and the hosting of same-sex marriages.

==== Various positions ====
===== Anglican =====
Since 1998, the Anglican Church has reassured people with same sex attraction they are loved by God and are welcomed as full members of the Body of Christ. The Church leadership has a variety of views in regard to homosexual expression and ordination. Some expressions of sexuality are considered sinful including "promiscuity, prostitution, incest, pornography, paedophilia, predatory sexual behaviour, and sadomasochism (all of which may be heterosexual and homosexual)". The Church is concerned with pressures on young people to engage sexually and encourages abstinence.

At the 13th Lambeth Conference in 1998, homosexuality was the most hotly debated issue. It was finally decided, by a vote of 526–70, to pass a resolution (1.10) calling for a "listening process" but stating (in an amendment passed by a vote of 389–190) that "homosexual practice" (not necessarily orientation) is "incompatible with Scripture". Reflecting on resolution 1.10 in the lead up to Lambeth 2022, Angela Tilby recalled the intervention of Bishop Michael Bourke, who successfully proposed an amendment which said: "We commit ourselves to listen to the experience of homosexual persons". Tilby considered that while the amendment had appeared inconsequential at the time, it had indeed been significant: she said that the idea of "patient listening" underpinned the Church of England's process "Living in Love and Faith".

===== Lutheran =====
Churches within Lutheranism hold stances on the issue ranging from labeling homosexual acts as sinful, to acceptance of homosexual relationships. For example, the Ethiopian Evangelical Church Mekane Yesus, the Lutheran denomination in Ethiopia, and second largest non-united Lutheran denomination in the world, has taken a stand that marriage is inherently between a man and a woman, and has formally broken fellowship with the ELCA. The Lutheran Church–Missouri Synod, the Lutheran Church of Australia, and the Wisconsin Evangelical Lutheran Synod recognize homosexual behavior as intrinsically sinful and seek to minister to those who are struggling with homosexual inclinations. However, the Church of Sweden, the Church of Denmark, the Church of Norway, or Lutheran churches of the Evangelical Church in Germany conducts same-sex marriages, while the Evangelical Lutheran Church in America and Evangelical Lutheran Church in Canada opens the ministry of the church to gay pastors and other professional workers living in committed relationships.

==== Rejecting position ====
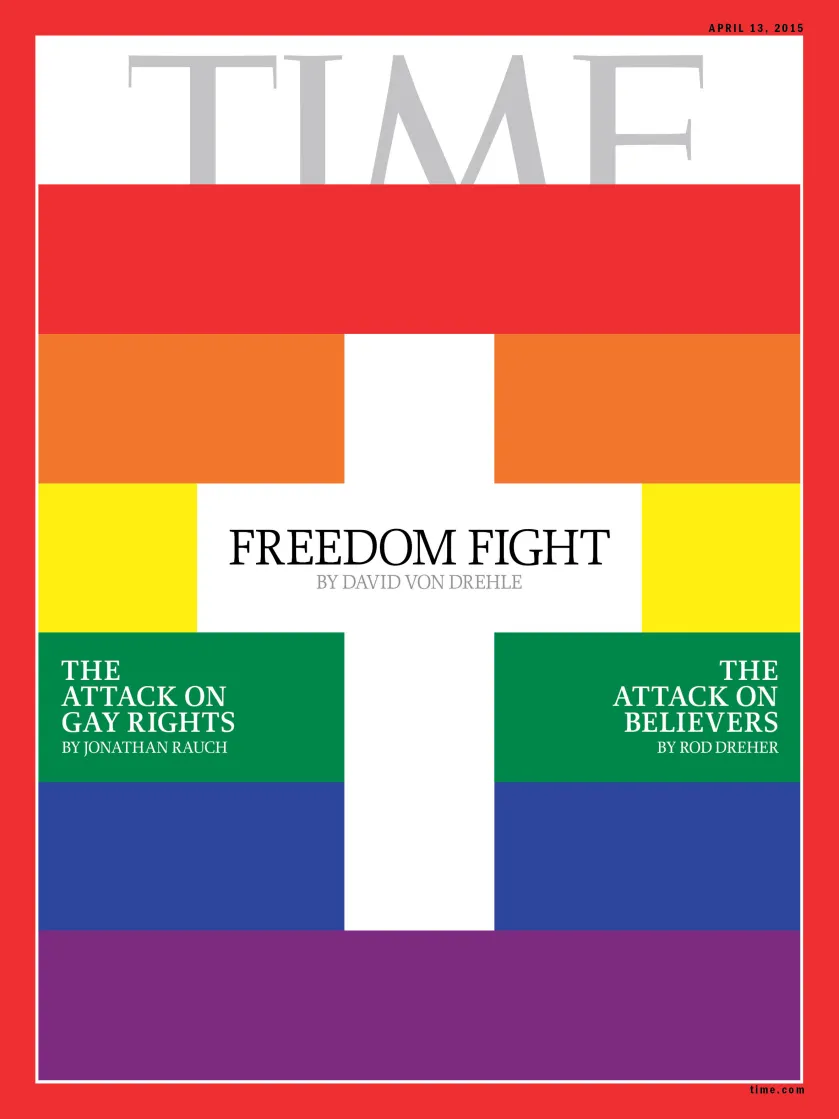
A 2015 cover of Time highlighting the conflict between some Christian denominations' views and LGBTQ rights

Some mainline Protestant denominations, such as the American Baptist Churches USA, the African Methodist churches, the Reformed Church in America, and the Presbyterian Church in America, Christian Reformed Church in North America also oppose LGBTQ relationships.

Quakers within the Friends United Meeting and the Evangelical Friends Church International believe that sexual relations are condoned only in marriage, which they define to be between a man and a woman.

Confessional Lutheran churches teach that it is sinful to have homosexual desires, even if they do not lead to homosexual activity. The Doctrinal statement issued by the Wisconsin Evangelical Lutheran Synod states that making a distinction between homosexual orientation and the act of homosexuality is confusing:

We cannot limit the sin of homosexuality to deeds but not desires, any more than we can limit heterosexual sin to deeds but not desires. Scripture clearly includes desires and inclinations toward sinful actions in the category of sin (Mt 5:27–28). This is true of both homosexual and heterosexual sin.

However, confessional Lutherans also warn against selective morality which harshly condemns homosexuality while treating other sins more lightly.

=== Evangelical churches ===
The positions of the evangelical churches are varied, according to denominations. Some evangelical denominations have adopted neutral positions, leaving the choice to local churches to decide for same-sex marriage. Others strongly oppose same-sex marriage, same-sex sexual activity, and expression of gay/lesbian/bisexual identity generally.

==== Evangelical Conservative positions ====
Some Evangelical Christians regard homosexual acts as sinful and think they should not be accepted by society. They tend to interpret biblical verses on homosexual acts to mean that the heterosexual family was created by God to be the bedrock of civilization and that same-sex relationships contradict God's design for marriage and is not his will. Christians who oppose homosexual relationships sometimes argue that same-gender sexual activity is a sin.

In opposing interpretations of the Bible that are supportive of homosexual relationships, conservative Christians have argued for the reliability of the Bible, and the meaning of texts related to homosexual acts, while often seeing what they call the diminishing of the authority of the Bible by many homosexual authors as being ideologically driven.

As an alternative to a school-sponsored Day of Silence opposing bullying of LGBTQ students, conservative Christians organized a Golden Rule Initiative, where they passed out cards saying "As a follower of Christ, I believe that all people are created in the image of God and therefore deserve love and respect." Others created a Day of Dialogue to oppose what they believe is the silencing of Christian students who make public their opposition to homosexuality.

On 29 August 2017, the Council on Biblical Manhood and Womanhood released a manifesto on human sexuality known as the "Nashville Statement". The statement was signed by 150 evangelical leaders, and includes 14 points of belief.

===== Fundamentalist position =====
Some fundamentalist conservative anti-LGBT activists on TV and radio accuse homosexual people of a gay agenda and of being responsible for social problems, such as terrorism. Fundamentalists also regularly accuse homosexuals of being responsible for natural disasters. Some evangelical churches in Uganda, Ghana, and Nigeria strongly oppose homosexuality and homosexuals as well as the LGTBQ community at large. They have campaigned for laws criminalizing homosexuality.

===== Moderate position =====
Some churches have a moderate Conservative position. They only support sexuality in marriage between a man and a woman, but show sympathy and respect towards homosexual people. Churches thus see themselves as "welcoming, but not affirming". This expression has its origin in the book Welcoming but Not Affirming: An Evangelical Response to Homosexuality published in 1998 by the American Baptist theologian Stanley Grenz.

====== Organizations ======
The French Evangelical Alliance, a member of the European Evangelical Alliance and the World Evangelical Alliance, adopted on 12 October 2002, through its National Council, a document entitled Foi, espérance et homosexualité ("Faith, Hope and Homosexuality"), in which homophobia, hatred and rejection of homosexuals are condemned, but which denies homosexual practices and full church membership of unrepentant homosexuals and those who approve of these practices. In 2015, the Conseil national des évangéliques de France (French National Council of Evangelicals) reaffirmed its position on the issue by opposing marriage of same-sex couples, while not rejecting homosexuals, but wanting to offer them more than a blessing; an accompaniment and a welcome.

The French evangelical pastor Philippe Auzenet, a chaplain of the association Oser en parler, regularly intervenes on the subject in the media. It promotes dialogue and respect, as well as sensitization in order to better understand homosexuals. He also said in 2012 that Jesus would go to a gay bar, because he was going to all people with love.

==== Inclusive position ====
===== International =====
There are international progressive Christian associations that allow blessings of same-sex marriage, such as the Association of Welcoming and Affirming Baptists and The Covenant Network (Pentecostal).

===== U.S. =====
A 2014 survey reported that 43% of white evangelical American Christians between the ages of 18 and 33 supported same-sex marriage. Some evangelical churches celebrate blessings of same-sex marriage. The change in beliefs in favor of blessings of same-sex marriage in evangelical churches has certain consequences for them. Various churches thus received an excommunication from their Christian denomination for not respecting the confession of faith. Other churches have faced significant departures of members from their congregations, seeing their financial resources diminish. Other churches have registered a record number of new members.

==== Neutral positions ====
Some evangelical associations have adopted neutral positions, leaving the choice to local churches to decide for same-sex marriage.

==== Denominational positions ====
===== Anabaptism =====
Most Mennonite associations hold a conservative position on homosexuality.

Some Mennonite associations, such as the Mennonite Church in the Netherlands, the Mennonite Church Canada and the Mennonite Church USA allow local churches to decide about blessings of same-sex marriage. The Supportive Communities Network brings together affirming churches and universities.

===== Baptist =====
Most Baptist associations in the world only support marriage between a man and a woman.

Some Baptist associations allow local churches to decide about blessings of same-sex marriage, such as the Canadian Association for Baptist Freedoms,, the American Baptist Churches USA, the Progressive National Baptist Convention (USA), the Cooperative Baptist Fellowship (USA), the National Baptist Convention, USA, the Baptist Union of Great Britain, the Open Baptists Association (Australia)

Some Progressive Baptist associations support blessings of same-sex marriage, such as the Alliance of Baptists (USA), the Baptist Peace Fellowship of North America (USA), the Aliança de Batistas do Brasil, the Fraternidad de Iglesias Bautistas de Cuba, and the Association of Welcoming and Affirming Baptists (international).

===== Pentecostalism =====
Most Pentecostal associations take a conservative stance on homosexuality.

The Covenant Network was formed in 2000 in Atlanta, Georgia, United States, and allow same-sex marriage. According to a denomination census released in 2023, it has 18 churches in 3 countries.

=== Restorationist churches ===
Restorationist churches, such as Seventh-Day Adventists, generally teach that homosexuals are 'broken' and can be 'fixed'. Jehovah's Witnesses believe that "The Bible condemns sexual activity that is not between a husband and wife, whether it is homosexual or heterosexual conduct. (1 Corinthians 6:18) [...] While the Bible disapproves of homosexual acts, it does not condone hatred of homosexuals or homophobia. Instead, Christians are directed to "respect everyone."—1 Peter 2:17, Good News Translation." The Church of Jesus Christ of Latter-day Saints said in 2015 that it officially welcomes its gay and lesbian members, if they choose sexual abstinence. Within the Stone-Campbell aligned restorationist churches the views are divergent. The churches of Christ (A Capella) and the Independent Christian Churches/Churches of Christ mostly adhere to a conservative position on LGBTQ members and will not perform weddings for gay and lesbian couples. The Disciples of Christ, is fully accepting of LGBTQ persons, often performs weddings for gay and lesbian couples, and ordains LGBTQ members. The United Church of Christ is an officially "open and affirming" church. Other Restorationist churches such as Millerite churches, have taken mixed positions but are increasingly accepting with some of their congregations fully accepting LGBTQ persons in all aspects of religious and political life. The Seventh-day Adventist Church maintains that homosexual sex itself is forbidden in the Bible.

=== Mormonism ===
The Community of Christ, a branch of Mormonism, fully accepts LGBTQ persons, performs weddings for gay and lesbian couples, and ordains LGBTQ members.

== Views supportive of homosexuality ==
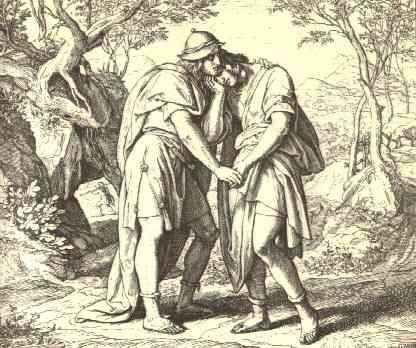
Friendship between Jonathan and David by Julius Schnorr von Karolsfeld (1860)

In the 20th century, theologians like Jürgen Moltmann, Hans Küng, John Robinson, Bishop David Jenkins, Don Cupitt, and Bishop Jack Spong challenged traditional theological positions and understandings of the Bible; following these developments some have suggested that passages have been mistranslated or that they do not refer to what is in the modern day understood as "homosexuality." Clay Witt, a minister in the Metropolitan Community Church, explains how theologians and commentators like John Shelby Spong, George Edwards and Michael England interpret injunctions against certain sexual acts as being originally intended as a means of distinguishing religious worship between Abrahamic and the surrounding pagan faiths, within which homosexual acts featured as part of idolatrous religious practices: "England argues that these prohibitions should be seen as being directed against sexual practices of fertility cult worship. As with the earlier reference from Strong's, he notes that the word 'abomination' used here is directly related to idolatry and idolatrous practices throughout the Hebrew Testament. Edwards makes a similar suggestion, observing that 'the context of the two prohibitions in Leviticus 18:22 and Leviticus 20:13 suggest that what is opposed is not same-sex activity outside the cult, as in the modern secular sense, but within the cult identified as Canaanite'".

In 1986, the Evangelical and Ecumenical Women's Caucus (EEWC), then known as the Evangelical Women's Caucus International, passed a resolution stating: "Whereas homosexual people are children of God, and because of the biblical mandate of Jesus Christ that we are all created equal in God's sight, and in recognition of the presence of the lesbian minority in EWCI, EWCI takes a firm stand in favor of civil rights protection for homosexual persons."

Some Christians believe that Biblical passages have been mistranslated or that these passages do not refer to LGBTQ orientation as currently understood. Liberal Christian scholars, like conservative Christian scholars, accept earlier versions of the texts that make up the Bible in Hebrew or Greek. However, within these early texts there are many terms that modern scholars have interpreted differently from previous generations of scholars. There are concerns with copying errors, forgery, and biases among the translators of later Bibles. They consider some verses such as those they say support slavery or the inferior treatment of women as not being valid today, and against the will of God present in the context of the Bible. They cite these issues when arguing for a change in theological views on sexual relationships to what they say is an earlier view. They differentiate among various sexual practices, treating rape, prostitution, or temple sex rituals as immoral and those within committed relationships as positive regardless of sexual orientation. They view certain verses, which they believe refer only to homosexual rape, as not relevant to consensual homosexual relationships.

Yale professor John Boswell has argued that a number of Early Christians entered into homosexual relationships, and that certain Biblical figures had homosexual relationships, such as Ruth and her mother-in-law Naomi, Daniel and the court official Ashpenaz, and David and King Saul's son Jonathan. Boswell has also argued that adelphopoiesis, a rite bonding two men, was akin to a religiously sanctioned same-sex union. Having partaken in such a rite, a person was prohibited from entering into marriage or taking monastic vows, and the choreography of the service itself closely parallelled that of the marriage rite. His views have not found wide acceptance, and opponents have argued that this rite sanctified a platonic brotherly bond, not a homosexual union. He also argued that condemnation of homosexuality began only in the 12th century. Boswell's critics point out that many earlier doctrinal sources condemn homosexuality as a sin even if they do not prescribe a specific punishment, and that Boswell's arguments are based on sources which reflected a general trend towards harsher penalties, rather than a change in doctrine, from the 12th century onwards.

Desmond Tutu, the former Anglican Archbishop of Cape Town and a Nobel Peace Prize winner, described homophobia as a "crime against humanity" and "every bit as unjust" as apartheid: "We struggled against apartheid in South Africa, supported by people the world over, because black people were being blamed and made to suffer for something we could do nothing about; our very skins. It is the same with sexual orientation. It is a given. [...] We treat them [gays and lesbians] as pariahs and push them outside our communities. We make them doubt that they too are children of God – and this must be nearly the ultimate blasphemy. We blame them for what they are."

Modern gay Christian leader Justin R. Cannon promotes what he calls "Inclusive Orthodoxy" ('orthodoxy' in this sense is not to be confused with the Eastern Orthodox Church). He explains on his ministry website: "Inclusive Orthodoxy is the belief that the Church can and must be inclusive of LGBTQ individuals without sacrificing the Gospel and the Apostolic teachings of the Christian faith." Cannon's ministry takes a unique and distinct approach from modern liberal Christians while still supporting homosexual relations. His ministry affirms the divine inspiration of the Bible, the authority of Tradition, and says "...that there is a place within the full life and ministry of the Christian Church for lesbian, gay, bisexual, and transgender Christians, both those who are called to lifelong celibacy and those who are partnered."

Today, many religious people are becoming more affirming of same-sex relationships, even in denominations with official stances against homosexuality. In the United States, people in denominations who are against same-sex relationships are liberalizing quickly, though not as quickly as those in more affirming groups. This social change is creating tension within many denominations, and even schisms and mass walk-outs.

Pope Francis voiced support for same-sex civil unions during an interview in a documentary film, Francesco, which was premiered at the Rome Film Festival on 21 October 2020.

=== Inclusive position ===
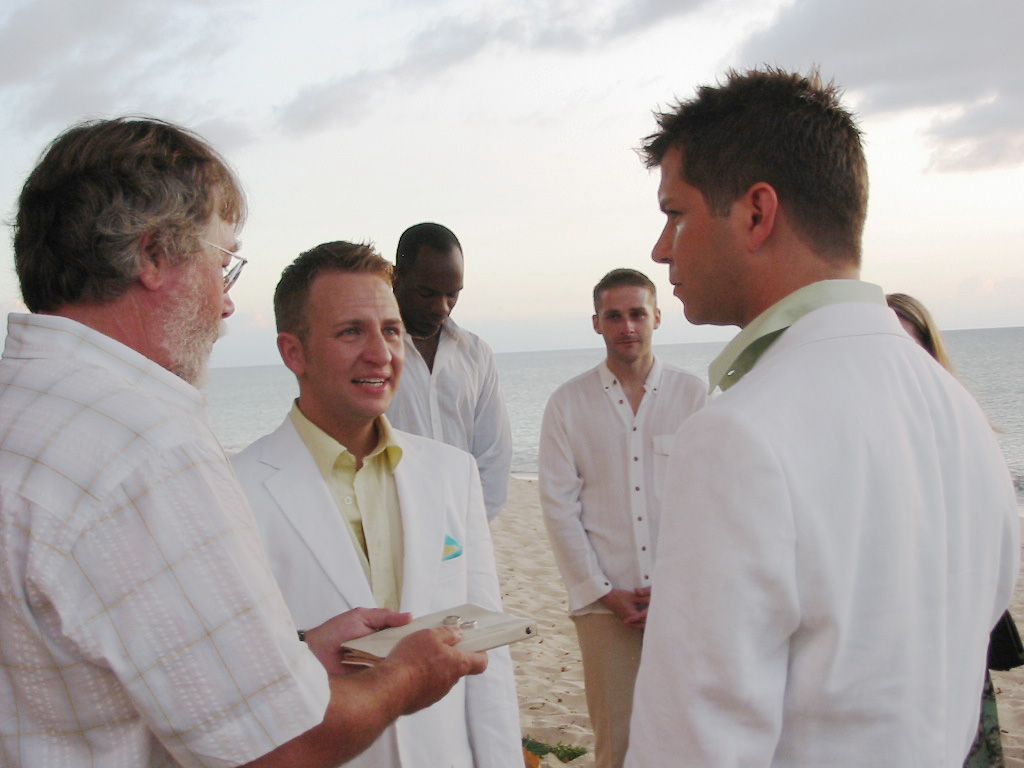
Marriage of two men celebrated by a Christian pastor in the United States.

Using historical-critical method, some 20th-century theologians have brought a new understanding to passages of the Bible referring to same-sex sexual practices. This allowed us to return to the original meaning of the words, which referred more to adultery, and to situate these passages within the framework of pederasty, a system historically criticized for the age gap and inequalities between people.

After being forced to resign due to being outed, American Pentecostal pastor Troy Perry published an advertisement announcing the opening of a gay-friendly church in Los Angeles, California, in the October 1968 issue of The Advocate. On October 6, 1968, the Metropolitan Community Church held its first service with 12 people in attendance. In 1969, through the church, he officiated at the wedding of two young men in Los Angeles.

On May 1, 1972, the United Church of Christ in the San Francisco Bay Area approved the ordination of William R. Johnson, an openly gay seminarian. He was ordained as a pastor at the Community Church San Carlos (United Church of Christ) on June 25, 1972. In 1974, with the help of San Francisco State University professor Sally Miller Gearhart, he published the book Loving Women/Loving Men: Gay Liberation and the Church, which argues, among other things, that marriage is a covenant relationship, regardless of gender.

In the context of the gay liberation movement and the declassification of homosexuality as a disease by the American Psychiatric Association in 1973, these studies prompted various Progressive Christians churches and denominations to abandon discriminatory interpretations for LGBTQ people and offer equal recognition within their churches. In some denominations, this recognition has come through the development of affirming networks of churches, universities and seminaries. These include American Baptists Concerned for Sexual Minorities in 1972 (replaced by the Association of Welcoming and Affirming Baptists in 1993) by members of the American Baptist Churches USA, UCC Coalition for Lesbian/Gay Concerns in 1972 (renamed Open and Affirming Coalition UCC in 2014) by members of the United Church of Christ, Lutherans Concerned for Gay People in 1974 (renamed ReconcilingWorks in 2012) by members of the Evangelical Lutheran Church in America, Presbyterians for Gay Concerns in 1974 and More Light Churches Network in 1992 (merged and renamed More Light Presbyterians in 1999) by members of the Presbyterian Church (USA), Affirmation: United Methodists for Lesbian/Gay Concerns in 1975 and Reconciling Ministries Network in 1984 by members of the United Methodist Church, Brethren Mennonite Council for LGBT Interests and Supportive Communities Network in 1976 by members of the Mennonite Church USA. Some of these networks have become international, such as the Association of Welcoming and Affirming Baptists and Reconciling Ministries Network.

In April 1976, the Student Christian Movement of Great Britain, a member of the World Student Christian Federation, organized a conference on gay liberation theology, which led to the founding of the Gay Christian Movement that same year and dialogue with churches in the United Kingdom.

In the context of the legalization of same-sex marriage in various countries and US states and during the 2000s, conceptual research into the meaning of marriage commitment in biblical texts prompted various churches to consider that the basis of Christian marriage and sexuality is to remain faithful in a covenant with one's spouse, regardless of gender. After national reflection, some Progressive Christian denominations then began to allow the blessing or same-sex marriage, usually leaving it to each local church to decide. After the legalization of same-sex marriage in April 2001 in the Netherlands, the Mennonite Church in the Netherlands was one of the first to pass this resolution that same year. Similar resolutions have taken place on other continents, such as in the Evangelical Church of the River Plate in South America in 2010, in the Uniting Presbyterian Church in Southern Africa in 2015, in the Uniting Church in Australia in 2018.

In the early 2010s, LGBTQ Christian students also advocated for equal human rights in administrative policies encouraging Christian colleges and universities to become inclusive, including Belmont University in Nashville in 2011, Goshen College in Goshen, Indiana and Eastern Mennonite University in Harrisonburg, Virginia in 2015.

According to a 2020 study by the Williams Institute at the University of California, Los Angeles School of Law, there are 4.1 million LGBT American adults who identify as Christian, including 1.5 million Protestants, 1.3 million Roman Catholics, and 1.3 million Christians of other denominations.

In 2021, the organization Believr launched a dating app for LGBTQ+ Christians.

In 2022, the documentary 1946: The Mistranslation That Shifted Culture explains how the American committee behind the Revised Standard Version Bible first translated two Greek words referring to abusive behavior and exploitative relationships as homosexual, in 1 Corinthians 6:9 and 1 Timothy 1:10 in 1946. From then on, other translations, such as the New International Version of the 1970s, decided to use the term "homosexual", thus propagating social exclusion. The Revised Standard Version translation committee changed the wording in 1971 by using the word "sexual perverts” in the publication of a revision. Fifty years later, millions of Bibles had been sold with this word change. The documentary claims other errors in English translations of other passages, such as Leviticus 18:22 which was translated as “Man shall not lie with man, for it is an abomination”, while the same passage taking into account the sacred prostitution context of the time was translated into German: “Man shall not lie with young boys as he does with a woman, for it is an abomination.”

=== Inclusive organizations ===
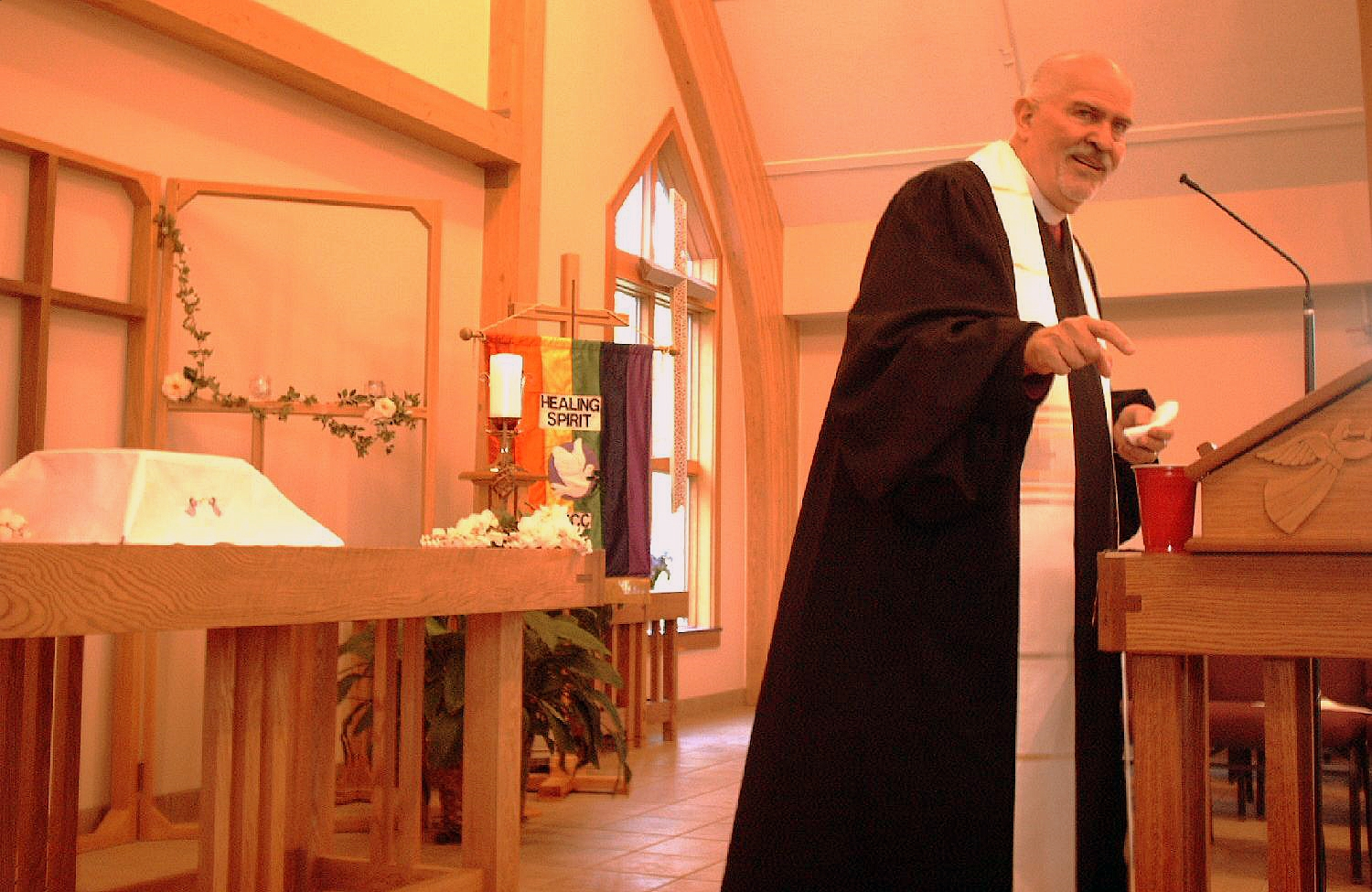
Rev. Troy Perry preaching in 2006 at a Metropolitan Community Church

Studies in the US show more LGBTQ individuals identify as Protestant than Catholic. George Barna, a conservative Christian author and researcher, conducted a survey in the United States in 2009 that found gay and lesbian people having a Christian affiliation were more numerous than had been presumed. He characterized some of his leading conclusions from the data as follows: "People who portray gay adults as godless, hedonistic, Christian bashers are not working with the facts. A substantial majority of gays cite their faith as a central facet of their life, consider themselves to be Christian, and claim to have some type of meaningful personal commitment to Jesus Christ active in their life today." Barna also found that LGBTQ people were more likely to interpret faith as an individual rather than a collective experience.

Candace Chellew-Hodge, liberal Christian lesbian founder of the online magazine Whosoever, responded to the findings: "All in all, I'm grateful for Barna even wandering into the subject of gay and lesbian religious belief. I think his study is important and can go a long way to dispelling the old "gays vs. God" dichotomy that too often gets played out in the media. However, his overall message is still harmful: Gays and lesbians are Christians – they're just not as good as straight ones." She argued that Barna had formulated his report with undue irony and skepticism, and that he had failed to take into account the reasons for the data which enkindled his "arrière pensée." The reason why far fewer homosexuals attend church, she argued, is that there are far fewer churches who will accept them. Equally, gays and lesbians do not see the Bible as unequivocally true because they are forced by its use against them to read it more closely and with less credulity, leading them to note its myriad contradictions.

Organizations for homosexual Christians exist across a wide range of beliefs and traditions. The interdenominational Q Christian Fellowship (formerly Gay Christian Network) has some members who affirm same-sex relationships and others who commit themselves to celibacy, groups it refers to as "Side A" and "Side B", respectively. According to founder Justin Lee:

We're just trying to get people together who experience attraction to the same sex, however they have handled that, and who love Jesus and say, OK, you are welcome here, and then let's pray together and figure out where God wants us to take it.

Some organizations cater exclusively to homosexual Christians who do not want to have gay sex, or attraction; the goals of these organizations vary. Some Christian groups focus on simply refraining from gay sex, such as Courage International and North Star. Other groups additionally encourage gay members to reduce or eliminate same-sex attractions. Love Won Out and the now-defunct Exodus International are examples of such ministries. These groups are sometimes referred to as ex-gay organizations, though many no longer use the term. Alan Chambers, the president of Exodus, says the term incorrectly implies a complete change in sexual orientation, though the group Parents and Friends of Ex-Gays and Gays continues to use the term. In addition, individual Christians identifying as gay who want to subscribe to the conservative ethic are becoming more vocal themselves.

Gay Christian writer and actor Peterson Toscano argues that organizations promoting orientation change are a "ruse". An organization he co-founded, Beyond Ex-Gay, supports people who feel they have been wounded by such organizations.

Other groups support or advocate for gay Christians and their relationships. In 2014 the United Church of Christ filed a lawsuit challenging North Carolina's ban on same-sex marriage, which is America's first faith-based challenge to same-sex marriage bans; the Alliance of Baptists joined the lawsuit later that year.

In Europe, working within the worldwide Anglican Communion on a range of discrimination issues, including those of LGBTQ clergy and people in the church, is Inclusive Church. The longest standing groups for lesbian and gay Christians in the UK, were Quest (for LGBTQ Catholics) and Metropolitan Community Church (UK) both founded in 1973; followed in 1976 by the non-denominational Lesbian and Gay Christian Movement; specifically aimed to meet the needs of lesbian and gay evangelicals, there is the Evangelical Fellowship for Lesbian and Gay Christians; specifically working within the Church of England is Changing Attitude, which also takes an international focus in working for gay, lesbian, bisexual and transgender affirmation within the Anglican Communion.

Sociologist Richard N. Pitt argues that these organizations are only available to LGBTQ members of liberal denominations, as opposed to those in conservative denominations. His review of the literature on gay Christians suggests that these organizations not only represent the interests of Christians who attend their churches, but (like gay-friendly and gay-affirming churches) also give these members useful responses to homophobic and heterosexist rhetoric. His research shows that those LGBTQ Christians who stay at homophobic churches "kill the messenger" by attacking the minister's knowledge about homosexuality, personal morality, focus on sin instead of forgiveness, and motivations for preaching against homosexuality.

== Movement of pro-celibacy gay Christians ==
There is a movement of people who call themselves Side B Christians, but choose to practice celibacy. The movement is often positioned against both liberals and conservatives. Recognizing themselves as gay or bisexual, these people believe that their attraction to same-sex people, while present, does not allow them to have homosexual relationships. They often say that their Christian conversion did not instantly change their sexual desires. They insist that the church should always reject homosexual practices, but that it should welcome gay people.

== Ex-gay movement ==
Various Christian organizations have been involved in the ex-gay movement. Love in Action, founded in 1973, was the first in the US. In 1976, its members founded Exodus International, a Christian organization (more specifically Protestant and Evangelical) in the United States and in various countries of the world. The Catholic organization Courage International was founded in 1980.

Conversion therapies for people wishing to change sexual orientation have been associated with the movement. Conversion therapy has been widely criticized and denounced by many major medical associations as pseudoscientific and harmful. Studies have found that LGBTQ individuals who experienced conversion therapy reported significantly higher rates of depression, suicide attempts, and substance abuse than their peers who did not.

== Criticism ==
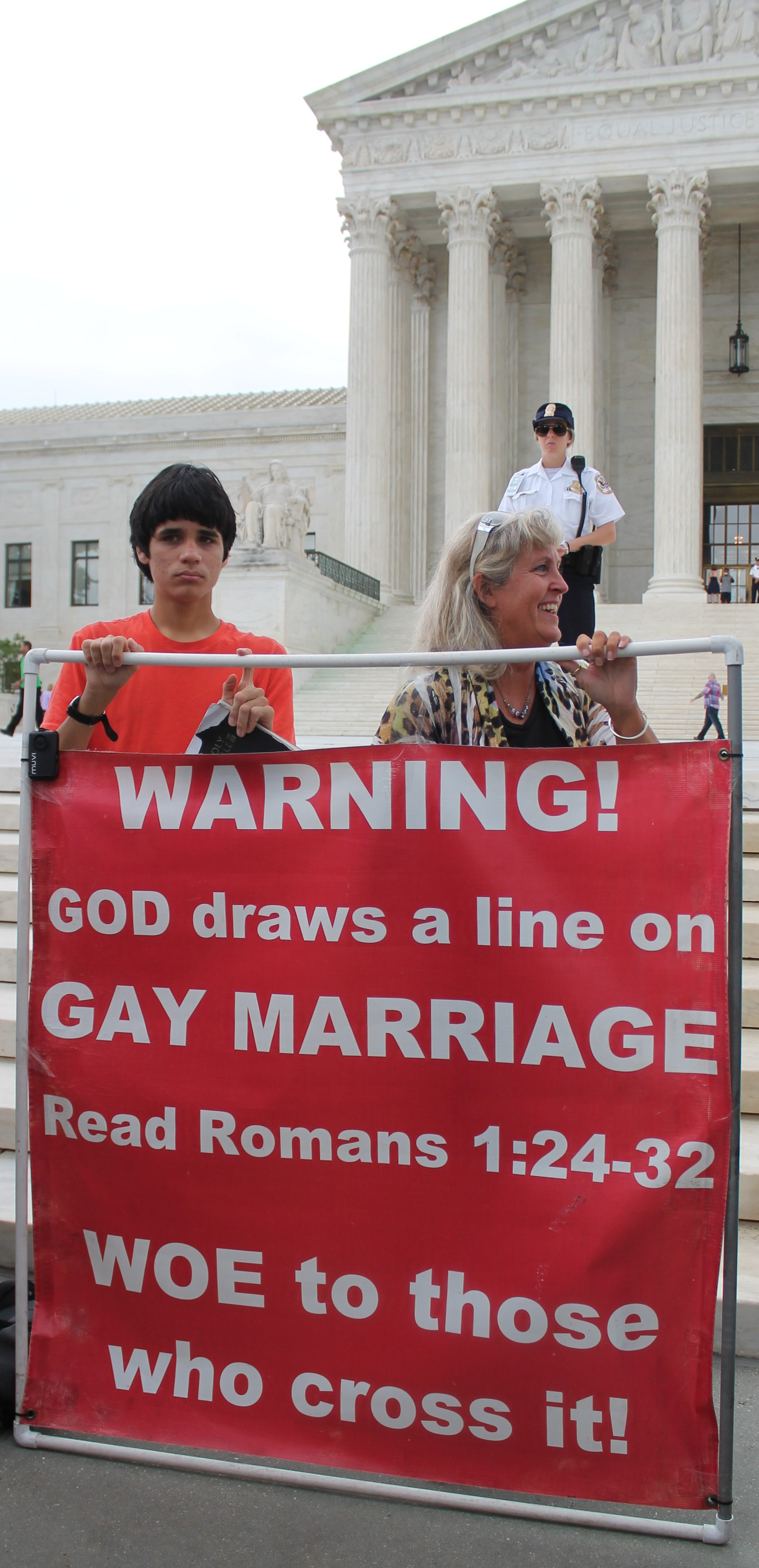
People protesting against gay marriage, citing the book of Romans from the New Testament from the Bible, the central text of Christianity. (Note: The verse stated in the sign is of Romans 1:24-32, which states the following (NABRE): "24 Therefore, God handed them over to impurity through the lusts of their hearts[a] for the mutual degradation of their bodies. 25 They exchanged the truth of God for a lie and revered and worshiped the creature rather than the creator, who is blessed forever. Amen. 26 Therefore, God handed them over to degrading passions. Their females exchanged natural relations for unnatural, 27 and the males likewise gave up natural relations with females and burned with lust for one another. Males did shameful things with males and thus received in their own persons the due penalty for their perversity. 28 And since they did not see fit to acknowledge God, God handed them over to their undiscerning mind to do what is improper. 29 They are filled with every form of wickedness, evil, greed, and malice; full of envy, murder, rivalry, treachery, and spite. They are gossips 30 and scandalmongers and they hate God. They are insolent, haughty, boastful, ingenious in their wickedness, and rebellious toward their parents. 31 They are senseless, faithless, heartless, ruthless. 32 Although they know the just decree of God that all who practice such things deserve death, they not only do them but give approval to those who practice them.")

In 2005, Baptist Pastor Al Sharpton criticized megachurches for focusing on "bedroom morals", statements against same-sex marriage and abortion, but ignoring issues of social justice, such as the immorality of war and the erosion of affirmative action.

In 2015, American theologian L. Gregory Jones has criticized some Christian churches for their lack of effort to interest young people in the Christian faith in a relevant way, while putting a lot of energy into talking negatively about homosexuality, which is even more boring for young people who want to work with the whole world.

== See also ==
- List of Christian denominational positions on homosexuality
- List of Christian denominations affirming LGBTQ people
- Ex-gay movement
- Side A, Side B, Side X, Side Y (theological views)
- Christianity and sexual orientation
- Homosexuality and religion
- Ellen Barrett – first openly lesbian priest (Episcopal)
- Corpus Christi (play)
- Evangelical and Ecumenical Women's Caucus
- Gay bishops
- History of Christianity and homosexuality
- Homosexuality and Judaism
- LGBTQ people and Islam
- Queer theology
- The Bible and homosexuality
- Homosexuality and religion
- Homosexuality and Seventh-day Adventism
- Societal attitudes toward homosexuality
