= Greg Johnson (pastor) =

Openly celibate gay pastor in a conservative evangelical denomination

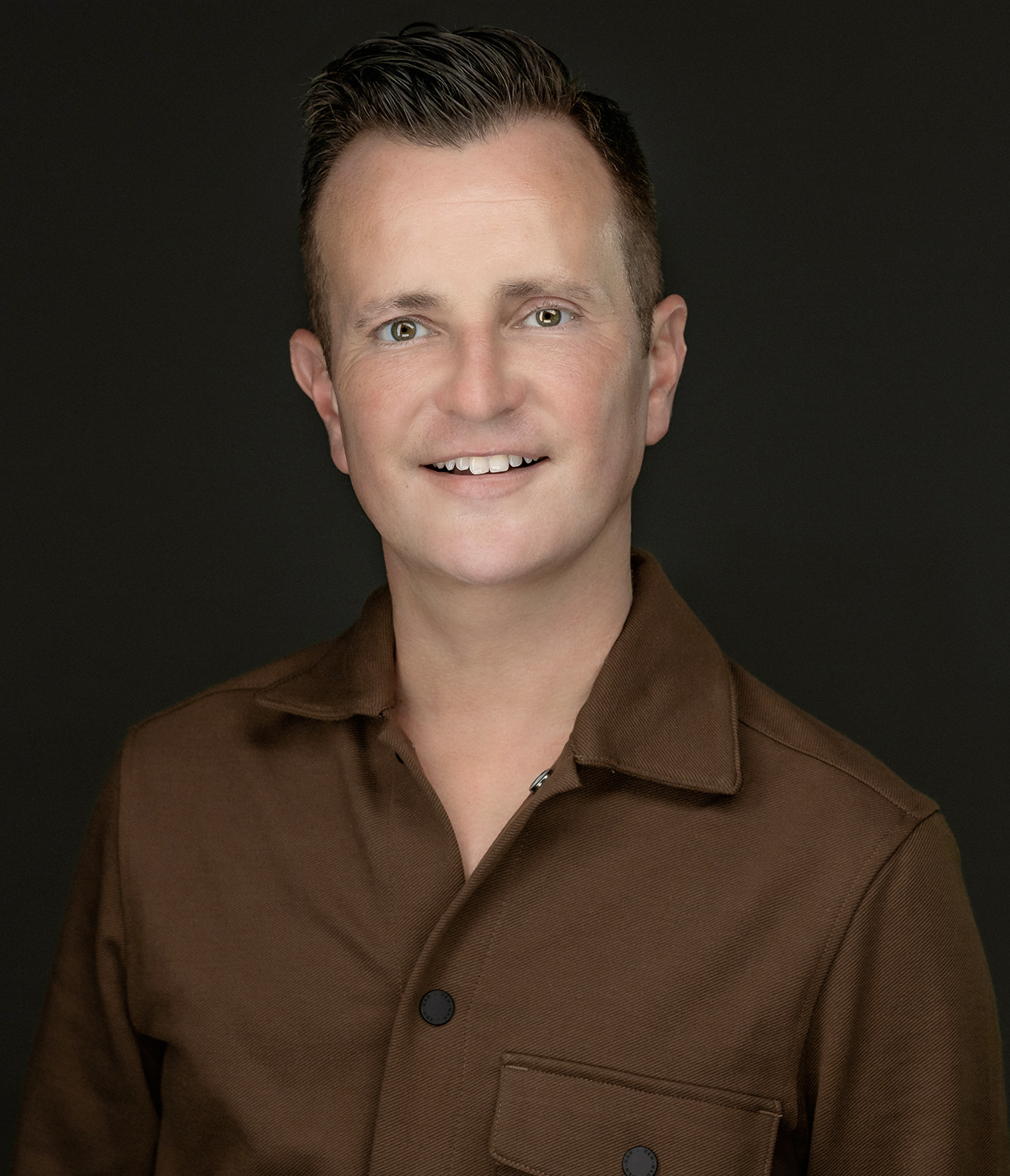
- Johnson in 2021

Personal details
- Denomination: Presbyterian Church in America

Greg Johnson is an American author and lead pastor of Memorial Presbyterian Church in St. Louis. He is one of the first celibate publicly gay-identified pastors of a non-affirming conservative evangelical church in the United States.

Raised in a secular D.C. family, Johnson described in Christianity Today his growing awareness of his sexuality and his conversion from atheism to Christianity while a student at the University of Virginia. He reconciles his sexuality with his faith through intentional Christian celibacy.

Johnson was ordained in the conservative Presbyterian Church in America in 2003. His doctoral research focused on the historical and theological development of the quiet time in Protestant devotional practice. Johnson is a contributor to USA Today and Christianity Today, and is author of several books including a critical history of the ex-gay movement endorsed by prominent Christian leader Tim Keller. Still Time to Care: What We Can Learn from the Church's Failed Attempt to Cure Homosexuality won the 2023 Christian Book Award in the category Faith and Culture.

== Revoice controversy ==
Johnson drew media attention beginning in 2018 for his role in the Revoice controversy. In 2018, Johnson's church hosted Revoice 18, a conference to support celibate gay Christians who hold to the traditional sexual ethic. The conference drew strong opposition from critics on both the right and the left. In response, the Presbyterian Church in America in 2019 endorsed the Council on Biblical Manhood and Womanhood's Nashville Statement forbidding Christians from "adopting a ... homosexual self-conception."

Denominational critics that year sought Johnson's removal from ministry for identifying as nonstraight and for arguing against sexual orientation change efforts as ineffective. Four church courts requested Missouri Presbytery to investigate Johnson, which exonerated him in 2019 and again in 2020. His exoneration was appealed to the denomination's Standing Judicial Commission. On October 22, 2021, that denominational supreme court ruled in favor of Missouri Presbytery. Members of the court clarified in their concurring opinion that the decision was only about the Presbytery, and not about Johnson or his views, stating "The SJC's decision in this case should not be read as a defense or affirmation of every statement or even every particular view of TE Johnson. That is not the role of the appellate court," as well as declaring that even some of those concurring with the decision possessed "ongoing concerns about some of TE Johnson's views." Johnson is among the first publicly identified gay celibate church leaders in a non-affirming conservative evangelical denomination in the United States.

While Johnson has stated that he has never been sexually active and that he supports the church's historical understanding of biblical sex and marriage, significant opposition to Johnson's openness about his sexual orientation led the denomination in 2021 to propose changes to its constitution to prevent celibate nonstraight people from ordination to ministry. Johnson advocated against these changes. While the changes gained the support of a majority of presbyteries, they failed to achieve the two-thirds supermajority needed for ratification.

By May 2022, two regional presbyteries again requested Johnson be tried at the national level for doctrinal error, claiming new, unspecified evidence of guilt. Additionally, several presbyteries had again submitted overtures to the 2022 General Assembly to amend the denominational constitution to restrict or regulate celibate non-straight clergy.

On June 23, 2022, the General Assembly of the Presbyterian Church in America voted 1167-978 to amend the Book of Church Order to state that "Men who describe themselves as homosexual, even those who describe themselves as homosexual and claim to practice celibacy by refraining from homosexual conduct, are disqualified from holding office." The amendment required approval of two-thirds of the denomination's 88 regional presbyteries.

On November 18, 2022, Johnson's church voted to withdraw from the Presbyterian Church in America. On December 6, 2022, while Johnson had remained a member in good standing, the denomination's Missouri Presbytery granted his request to be removed from the rolls of that body, thereby withdrawing his membership from the Presbyterian Church in America.

== Bibliography ==
- Still Time to Care: What We Can Learn from the Church's Failed Attempt to Cure Homosexuality. Zondervan Reflective. 2021. ISBN 9781634098304.
- The World according to God: A biblical view of culture, work, science, sex & everything else. InterVarsity Press. 2002. ISBN 9780830823352.

== See also ==
- Side B Christians
