= Affirming Christian Fellowship =

LGBTQ-affirming Christian ministry association

- Founded: 1988, Phoenix, Arizona
- Founder: Rev. Fred L. Pattison
- Type: non-profit, religious
- Location: Tucson, Arizona
- President: Rev. David Thomas
- Website: www.ACF.lgbt

The Affirming Christian Fellowship (ACF) is an association of Christian and Evangelical ministries that are a part of and are affirming to the LGBTQ community.

== History ==
The Fellowship was founded as the Evangelical Network (TEN) in 1988 by Rev. Fred L. Pattison, pastor of Casa de Cristo Evangelical Church in Phoenix, Arizona. At that time, Casa de Cristo was a Metropolitan Community Church (UFMCC). Pattison's original vision was to network within MCC to find other Evangelical Christians in the denomination. However, when Casa de Cristo's board and congregation voted to leave MCC in 1988, the focus of TEN changed to reaching out to and helping start independent Evangelical churches with predominantly gay and lesbian congregations.

When Pattison retired from his pastorate as well as the presidency of TEN, he recommended to the board of TEN that his successor be Todd Ferrell of Freedom in Christ Church in San Francisco where Ferrell was serving as a church elder. Ferrell served as president of TEN for nearly four years and was succeeded by Pattison's pastor-successor, Ronnie Pigg. In 2004, TEN's church affiliates voted in a new board with Todd Ferrell returning as president. He led the organization until 2017 when David Thomas, pastor of Abundant Grace Church in Granite Falls, North Carolina, was chosen as TEN president.

For several years, TEN's annual conferences were held in March at Casa de Cristo in Phoenix. An "international" conference was later begun and held in Vancouver, British Columbia over Labor Day weekend in September. Eventually, it was decided by members and the board that in order to reach more members nationwide, one annual conference would be held at different cities around the United States with various churches across the nation acting as host.

In addition to many years of conferences/gatherings, TEN/ACF has been active in social justice issues including:

- Worlds AIDS Conference at Saddleback Church
- An invitation to the United Nations to address homophobia in Uganda
- Meeting with the US Secretary of Labor concerning workplace safety for the LGBTQ community
- Support of same sex marriage and adoption
- Campaigns against legislation that would permit businesses to discriminate against LGBTQ customers

== Theology ==
The ACF Statement of Faith is similar in content to many mainstream Christian organizations. The organization's Statement of Faith states that they believe:

- The Bible to be the inspired, the only infallible, authoritative Word of God.
- There is one true God eternally existent in the Father, Son and Holy Spirit.
- In the deity of our Lord Jesus Christ, in His virgin birth, in His sinless life, in His miracles, in His vicarious and atoning death through His shed blood, in His bodily resurrection, in His ascension to the right hand of the Father, and in His personal return in power and glory.
- That for the salvation of lost and sinful people, regeneration by the Holy Spirit is absolutely essential.
- The present ministry of the Holy Spirit by whose indwelling the Christian is enabled to live a godly life.
- In the resurrection of both the saved and the lost; they that are saved unto the resurrection of life and they that are lost until the resurrection of damnation.
- In the spiritual unity of believers in our Lord Jesus Christ.
- That all who seek to live faithfully regardless of ability, age, class, ethnicity, gender, gender-identity, race or sexual orientation are full participants in the Body of Christ. We welcome and affirm all into the life of the church.

While there are other LGBTQ affirming Christian organizations (such as Q Christian Fellowship and The Reformation Project), TEN continues to focus on outreach specifically to the LGBTQ Evangelical community.

== Annual conference ==
Since 1988, TEN/ACF has hosted an annual conference including times of worship, keynote speakers, and workshops. The conferences have been held annually in different US cities, once always in the spring, then for a time both spring and early fall, and currently during late summer. Previous guests and speakers have included Marsha Stevens-Pino, Peggy Campolo, Tony Campolo, Ray Boltz, Stan Mitchell, Jay Bakker, Mark Tidd, and Kenny Bishop.
