= Matthew Vines =

American LGBT activist

Matthew Vines (born March 9, 1990) is an American LGBT activist, known for the viral YouTube video "The Gay Debate: The Bible and Homosexuality" and his related 2014 book, God and the Gay Christian.

== Background ==
Vines grew up in Wichita, Kansas, having interests in speaking, writing and the performing arts. While in high school, he created a popular fan website dedicated to the Harry Potter film series. The website, Veritaserum.com, drew more than 50,000 hits per day, and became a source of employment for him as he maintained the site and sold space within it to advertisers. Growing up, he attended an evangelical Presbyterian church with his family. Upon graduation from high school, he was accepted into Harvard, where he studied for two years during 2008–2010, focusing on philosophy. He then quit Harvard in order to pursue a full-time study of the Bible's statements on homosexuality in response to widespread belief that homosexual expression is disapproved of by God - a belief which was held at the time by his own parents and their family church. He was unable to convince the leadership of his family church of his opinion that they misunderstood what the Bible states about homosexuality, and this led to both Vines himself and other members of his family leaving that church.

On October 1, 2022, Vines married Zachary Robertson, a physician in the Dallas-Fort Worth metropolitan area.

== LGBT advocacy ==
In March 2012, Vines delivered a speech in front of a congregation at College Hill United Methodist Church, detailing his belief that "the Bible never directly addresses, and certainly does not condemn, loving, committed same-sex relationships". The presentation was recorded on video and uploaded to YouTube, where it went viral on social networks. The clip included a detailed treatment of the Bible verses that are generally translated to refer to homosexuality, and in it Vines says that once original languages and context are taken into consideration, some Bible references are more ambiguous than many people realize. Some scholars pointed out that the material in the video was largely not new, but the format made the formerly “fringe” material more accessible to the general public. In the first six months since it was uploaded, the video of the speech had been seen more than 980,000 times on YouTube.

Vines founded The Reformation Project (TRP), a non-profit organization for seeking greater inclusion of LGBT lay members and clergy in mainstream Christian churches. TRP does not embrace queer theology, but rather "promotes what it calls affirming theology, which assumes that the Bible is inerrant, but has simply been misinterpreted at the expense of LGBT people. Affirming theology holds that better Bible interpretation fixes the problem. Based on that understanding of affirming theology, TRP believes 'that the church should bless same-sex marriages and that gay, bisexual, and transgender people should be fully included in the church as equal members of the body of Christ.'"

Vines is the author of the book God and the Gay Christian, published by Convergent Books in 2014, in which he provides a backdrop to his speech and responds to the main themes of the controversy.

=== Criticism ===
Writing for the conservative magazine First Things, doctoral student Joshua Gonnerman called Vines' hermeneutical approach deeply flawed. Robert Gagnon said that he and other scholars had previously refuted the arguments that Vines raised. Writing for Answers in Genesis, Ken Ham and Steve Golden argue that Vines' perspective is an "attack on the reliability and perspicuity of Scripture." Tim Keller builds on this argument in opposition to Vines' work, suggesting that Vines "decisively shifts the ultimate authority to define right and wrong onto the individual Christian and away from the biblical text... Yes, there are things in the Bible that Christians no longer have to follow but, if the Scripture is our final authority, it is only the Bible itself that can tell us what those things are. The prohibitions against homosexuality are re-stated in the New Testament (Romans 1, 1 Corinthians 6, 1 Timothy 1) but Jesus himself (Mark 7), as well as the rest of the New Testament, tells us that the clean laws and ceremonial code is no longer in force. Vines asserts that he maintains a belief in biblical authority, but with arguments like this one he is actually undermining it. This represents a massive shift in historic Christian theology and life."

== See also ==
- History of Christianity and homosexuality
- Queer Theology
- Side A, Side B, Side X, and Side Y (theological views)
