= Rebecca Tushnet =

American law professor

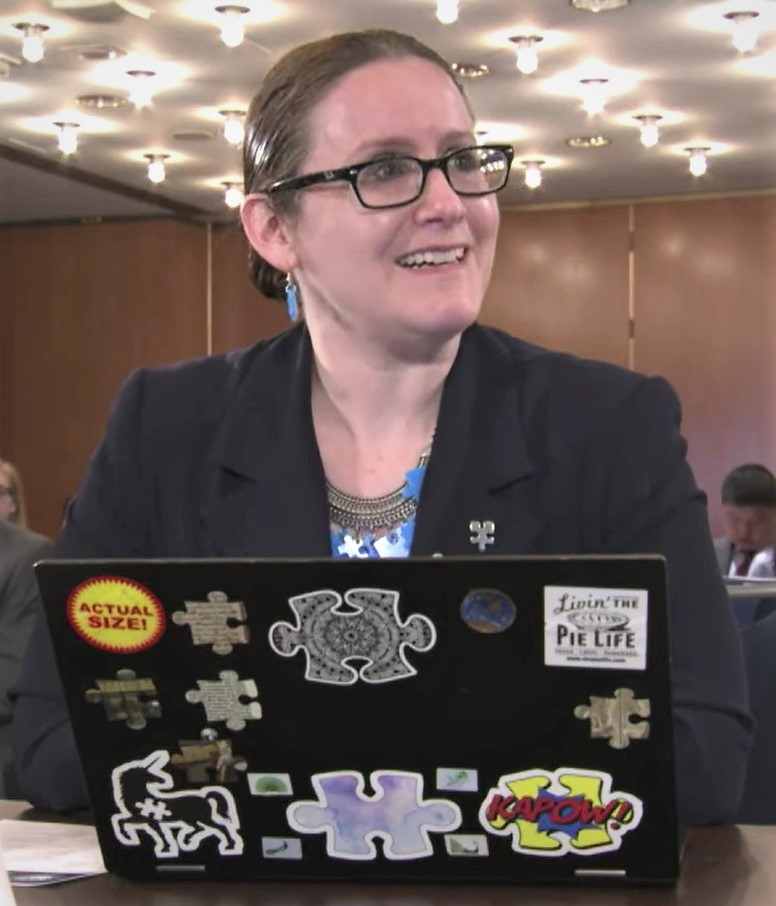
- Tushnet at a U.S. Copyright Office Section 512 Study Roundtable, 2019
- Born: April 4, 1973 (age 53)
- Education: Harvard University (BA); Yale University (JD)
- Father: Mark Tushnet
- Relatives: Eve Tushnet (sister)
- Website: Personal website

Rebecca Tushnet (born April 4, 1973) is an American legal scholar. She serves as the Frank Stanton Professor of First Amendment Law at Harvard Law School. Her scholarship focuses on copyright, trademark, First Amendment, and false advertising.

In addition to her general scholarship, Tushnet is known for her fanfiction-related scholarship and her legal advocacy work for the Organization for Transformative Works, a nonprofit fandom-related project that supports fanworks (such as fanfiction) through preservation and advocacy.

== Biography ==
=== Education ===
Tushnet was a policy debater at Harvard, getting to finals of the National Debate Tournament in 1992 and 1995, she received an A.B. from Harvard University in 1995, and earned her J.D. from Yale Law School in 1998.

=== Career ===
Tushnet served as a law clerk to Judge Edward R. Becker of the United States Court of Appeals for the Third Circuit and later for Justice David Souter of the United States Supreme Court. She practiced at Debevoise & Plimpton. Tushnet then entered teaching, first at NYU School of Law (2002–04), then at Georgetown University Law Center (2004–16), and most recently at Harvard Law School. In practice, Tushnet has represented fans in copyright and trademark disputes with rightsholders.

== Personal life ==
Her father is Mark Tushnet and her mother is Elizabeth Alexander, who directs the National Prison Project of the American Civil Liberties Union.

Her sister Eve Tushnet is a lesbian Catholic author and blogger.

== Selected scholarship and casebooks ==
Articles

- "Worth a Thousand Words: The Images of Copyright Law", 125 Harvard Law Review. 683 (2012)
- "Gone in 60 Milliseconds: Trademark Law and Cognitive Science", 86 Texas Law Review. 507 (2008)
- "Legal Fictions: Copyright, Fan Fiction, and a New Common Law", 17 Loy. L.A. Ent. L.J. 651 (1997)
- "Copy This Essay: How Fair Use Doctrine Harms Free Speech and How Copying Serves It", 114 Yale Law Journal 535 (2004)
- "Copyright as a Model for Free Speech Law: What Copyright Has in Common with Anti-Pornography Laws, Campaign Finance Reform, and Telecommunications Regulation" 42 Boston College Law Review 1 (2000)

Casebooks

- Advertising & Marketing Law: Cases & Materials (2014 ed.), with Eric Goldman (the first casebook on this topic)

== Awards ==
- 1997 Nathan Burkan Prize for best paper in the field of copyright ("Legal Fictions")
- The Copyright Society of the USA awarded her the 2014 Seton Award for Performance Anxiety: Copyright Embodied and Disembodied, 60 Journal of the Copyright Society of the U.S.A. 209 (2013) SSRN 2264277.
- 2015 recipient of Public Knowledge's IP3 Award in the area of intellectual property
- In 2016, her blog was inducted into the ABA Journal's "Blawg 100 Hall of Fame."

== See also ==
- List of law clerks for the third seat of the Supreme Court of the United States
