= Eve Tushnet =

American lesbian Catholic writer (born 1978)

- Born: 1978 (age 47–48)
- Education: Yale University (BA)
- Occupations: Author; blogger
- Parents: Elizabeth Alexander; Mark Tushnet

Eve Tushnet (born 1978) is an American Catholic lesbian author, blogger, and speaker. In addition to authoring fiction and nonfiction books, she has a blog and writes regularly for several major magazines, among them The American Spectator, Commonweal, National Catholic Register, National Review, America Magazine, and The Washington Blade. Tushnet was one of the people who helped to found the organization Building Catholic Futures.

== Views ==
Tushnet is celibate due to the Catholic Church's teaching on sex outside of heterosexual marriage.

Tushnet was active in politics speaking against same-sex marriage, having stated that marriage should be reserved for heterosexuals, whose "relationships can be either uniquely dangerous or uniquely fruitful. Thus it makes sense to have an institution dedicated to structuring and channeling them."

In 2022, Tushnet said that she regretted her involvement in anti-gay-marriage organizing, stating that she wants there to be more expansive, non-marital forms of legal kinship available, and that the government should provide legal protection for people who are loving and caring for each other.

Throughout Tushnet's writing career on Christianity and sexuality, she has often referenced forms of nonsexual intimacy available to gay (and all) Catholics, such as Christian traditions of sworn kinship and covenant friendship. As Scriptural basis, she references the positive Biblical examples of non-marital same-sex love such as Ruth and Naomi, David and Jonathan, or Jesus and John. Her writing often focuses on how Catholic living and lesbianism can coexist and positively affect one another. "I really think the most important thing is, I really like being gay and I really like being Catholic," she said in a 2010 interview with The New York Times. "If nobody ever calls me self-hating again, it will be too soon."

== Bibliography ==
=== Non-fiction ===
- Tushnet, Eve (2014). Gay and Catholic : accepting my sexuality, finding community, living my faith.
- Tushnet, Eve, ed. (2018). Christ's Body, Christ's Wounds: Staying Catholic When You've Been Hurt in the Church. Cascade Books.
- Tushnet, Eve (2021). Tenderness : a gay Christian's guide to unlearning rejection and experiencing God's extravagant love.

=== Novels ===
- Tushnet, Eve (2015). Amends : a novel.
- — (2019). Punishment : a love story.

=== Short fiction ===
Stories

Title	Year	First published	Reprinted/collected	Notes
A story like mine	2009	Tushnet, Eve (July 2009). "A story like mine". Lady Churchill's Rosebud Wristlet. 24.		

== Personal life ==
Her father is Mark Tushnet, a professor at Harvard Law School. Her mother, Elizabeth Alexander, directs the National Prison Project of the American Civil Liberties Union. Her sister Rebecca Tushnet is also a professor at Harvard Law School.

Tushnet came out as a lesbian around age 13 or 14 and her family was supportive. She entered Yale University in 1996 as "a happy lesbian". Raised in a secular Jewish household, she converted to Catholicism in 1998 at age 19 during her sophomore year. After college, she joined the National Catholic Register. She was also a researcher at the Manhattan Institute for Policy Research, a conservative think tank.

== See also ==
- Catholic Church and homosexuality
- Side B Christian
