= Side B Christians =

Celibate Christians who identify as LGBTQ

Side B Christians are primarily Protestant Christians who identify as LGBTQ or have LGBTQ experiences, but adhere to a non-affirming sexual ethic and thus commit to celibacy or a mixed-orientation marriage. The term Side B derives from an Internet forum where Side A Christians, with an affirming view of LGBTQ sexuality, were contrasted with Side B Christians. Prominent Side B Christians include Eve Tushnet, a lesbian Catholic based in Washington, D.C., and Bekah Mason, executive director of Revoice. In particular, Side B Christians reject previous iterations of conversion therapy that falsely promise to change sexual orientation from the same sex to the opposite sex. Side B is also distinct from Side Y, which does not affirm LGBT identification.

== History ==
The distinction between Side A and Side B first took place as part of the Gay Christian Network, founded by Justin Lee. Some make additional distinctions, including Side X, representing ex-gay Christians. In 2018, Revoice was launched as a conference for Christians predominantly identifying as Side B. Much of the movement of celibate LGBTQ Christians has its origins in the American evangelical movement.

== Prominent Side B Christians ==
- Eve Tushnet
- Wesley Hill
- Josh Proctor
- David Bennett
- Greg Johnson
- Grant Hartley
- Bridget Eileen Rivera
- Nate Collins

== See also ==
- Christianity and homosexuality
- Ex-gay movement
- Christianity and sexual orientation
- Homosexuality and religion
- History of Christianity and homosexuality
- Queer theology
- The Bible and homosexuality
- Side A, Side B, Side X, Side Y (theological views)
