= Mark Tushnet =

American constitutional law scholar (born 1945)

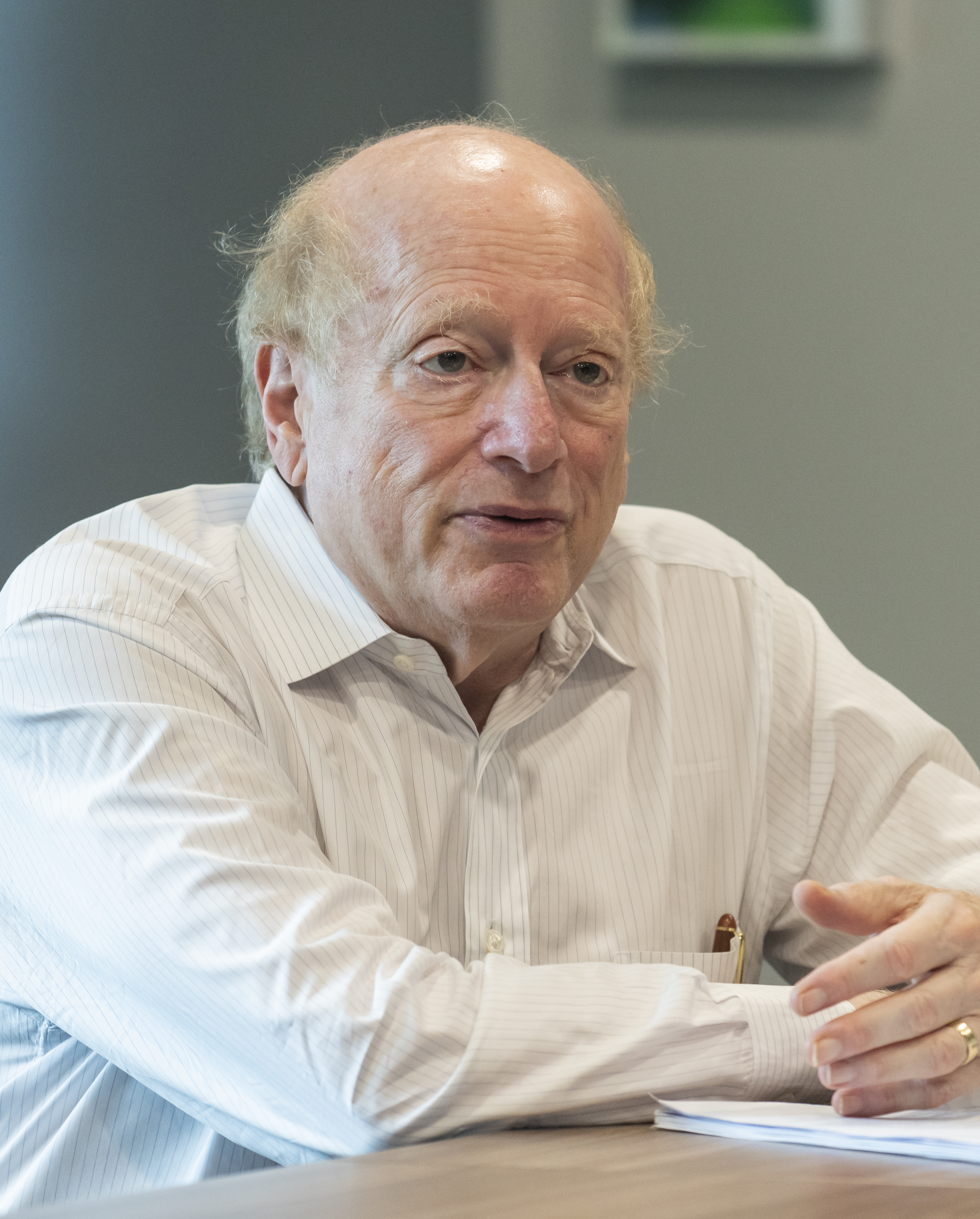
- Tushnet in 2018
- Born: Mark Victor Tushnet; 18 November 1945 (age 80); Newark, New Jersey, U.S.
- Title: William Nelson Cromwell Professor of Law Emeritus
- Children: Rebecca; Eve

Academic background
- Education: Harvard University (BA); Yale University (MA, JD)
- Influences: Thurgood Marshall

Academic work
- Discipline: Constitutional law
- Institutions: University of Wisconsin–Madison; Georgetown University; Harvard University

Mark Victor Tushnet (born 18 November 1945) is an American legal scholar. He specializes in constitutional law and theory, including comparative constitutional law, and is currently the William Nelson Cromwell Professor of Law at Harvard Law School. Tushnet is identified with the critical legal studies movement.

Tushnet is a main proponent of the idea that judicial review should be strongly limited and that the Constitution should be returned "to the people." In 2020, he published a book extending his previous writing about judicial overreach concerning the process of judicial review, which he originally started discussing in his 1999 book on this subject.

== Career ==
In 1967, Tushnet received a Bachelor of Arts from Harvard College. He later received a Master of Arts in history from Yale University and a Juris Doctor from the Yale Law School. Tushnet has been a faculty member at the University of Wisconsin–Madison while he taught for many years at the Georgetown University Law Center and has given lectures at Duke University.

Tushnet served as a law clerk to Justice Thurgood Marshall of the United States Supreme Court between 1972 and 1973. In a 1996 congressional hearing on President Bill Clinton's veto of the Partial-Birth Abortion Ban Act, Tushnet testified about his involvement in Roe v. Wade, the 1973 case that struck down state laws prohibiting abortion. During questioning it was alleged that a memorandum written by Tushnet to Marshall had a significant influence on the outcome of the case. More recently, he commented on the power of the president to pardon himself, composition of the Court, and the retirement of Justice Anthony Kennedy. He is also widely quoted in the press as an expert on the First Amendment right to free speech and the scope of presidential powers. In 2016, Tushnet was listed among the ten most frequently cited law professors.

One of the more controversial figures in constitutional theory, he is identified with the critical legal studies movement and once stated in an article that, were he asked to decide actual cases as a judge, he would seek to reach results that would "advance the cause of socialism". Tushnet is a main proponent of the idea that judicial review should be strongly limited and that the Constitution should be returned "to the people." Tushnet is, with Harvard Law Professor Vicki Jackson, the co-author of a casebook entitled Comparative Constitutional Law (Foundation Press, 2d ed. 2006).

In 2020, Tushnet published a book extending his previous writing about judicial overreach concerning the process of judicial review, which he originally started discussing in his 1999 book on this subject.

== Personal life ==
Tushnet is Jewish, and he married his wife Elizabeth Alexander at a Methodist Church. She is currently a Unitarian and formerly directed the National Prison Project of the American Civil Liberties Union but now works in private practice. Their daughter Rebecca Tushnet is also a professor of law at Harvard Law School. Their other daughter Eve is a lesbian Catholic author and blogger.

== Bibliography ==
1. Taking Back the Constitution: Activist Judges and the Next Age of American Law, (Yale U. Press, 2020).
2. In the Balance: Law and Politics on the Roberts Court, (W. W. Norton & Company, 2013) ISBN 0393073440.
3. I Dissent: Great Opposing Opinions in Landmark Supreme Court Cases, (Malaysia: Beacon Press, pp. 256, 2008)
4. Weak Courts, Strong Rights: Judicial Review and Social Welfare Rights in Comparative Constitutional Law, (Princeton University Press, 2007).
5. A Court Divided: The Rehnquist Court and the Future of Constitutional Law (W. W. Norton & Company, 2005) ISBN 0393327574
6. The New Constitutional Order (Princeton U. Press 2003).
7. Slave Law in the American South: State v. Mann in History and Literature (University Press of Kansas 2003).
8. The Oxford Handbook of Legal Studies (Peter Cane & Mark V. Tushnet eds., Oxford University Press 2003).
9. Defining the Field of Comparative Constitutional Law (Vicki C. Jackson & Mark Tushnet eds., Praeger 2002).
10. And L. Michael Seidman et al., Constitutional Law (Little, Brown and Co. 4th ed. 2001).
11. Et al., Federal Courts in the 21st Century: Cases and Materials (LexisNexis 2001).
12. Marshall, Thurgood (2001). Tushnet, Mark V. (ed.). Thurgood Marshall: His Speeches, Writings, Arguments, Opinions and Reminiscences. Kennedy, Randall (Foreword by). Chicago: Chicago Review Press, Incorporated – Lawrence Hill Books. ISBN 9781556523861.
13. Making Constitutional Law: Thurgood Marshall and the Supreme Court, 1961-1991 (Oxford University Press 1997).
14. Brown v. Board of Education: The Battle for Integration (Franklin Watts 1995).
15. The Warren Court in Historical and Political Perspective (Mark V. Tushnet ed., 1993).
16. Making Civil Rights Law: Thurgood Marshall and the Supreme Court, 1956–1961 (1994).
17. The NAACP's Legal Strategy Against Segregated Education, 1925–1950 (1987).
18. The American Law of Slavery, 1810–1860: Considerations of Humanity and Interest (1981).
19. And L. Michael Seidman et al., Constitutional Law (Little, Brown and Co. Supp. 1986, 1988, 1990, 1991, 2d ed. 1991, Supp. 1992, 1995, 1996, 3d ed. 1996, Supp. 1998, 4th ed. 2001).
20. And Vicki C. Jackson, Comparative Constitutional Law (Foundation Press 1999).
21. Taking the Constitution Away From the Courts (Princeton University Press 1999), excerpted in Great Cases in Constitutional Law (Robert P. George ed., Princeton University Press, 2000) (reprinting chapter 1 in substance). Symposium of Commentaries on this book: 34 University of Richmond Law Review 359–566 (2000).
22. And L. Michael Seidman et al., Teacher's Manual to The First Amendment (Aspen Law & Business 1999).
23. And Francisco Forrest Martin, The Rights International Companion to Constitutional Law: An International Human Rights Law Supplement (Kluwer Law International 1999).
24. And L. Michael Seidman, Remnants of Belief: Contemporary Constitutional Issues (Oxford University Press 1996).
25. Constitutional Issues: The Death Penalty (Facts On File, Inc. 1994).
26. Constitutional Law (International Library of Essays in Law & Legal Theory) (Mark V. Tushnet, ed., New York University Press 1992).
27. Comparative Constitutional Federalism: Europe and America (Mark V. Tushnet, ed., Greenwood Press 1990).
28. Central America and the Law: The Constitution, Civil Liberties, and the Courts (South End Press 1988).
29. Red, White, and Blue: A Critical Analysis of Constitutional Law (Harvard University Press 1988).
30. Out of Range: Why the Constitution Can't End the Battle over Guns (Oxford University Press 2007).

== See also ==
- List of law clerks for the tenth seat of the Supreme Court of the United States
