= Justin Lee (activist) =

American Christian

- Lee in 2010
- Education: William G. Enloe High School
- Alma mater: Wake Forest University
- Occupations: Author, speaker, LGBTQ Christian activist
- Known for: Torn: Rescuing the Gospel from the Gays-vs.-Christians Debate
- Spouse: Michael
- Website: www.geekyjustin.com

Justin Lee is an American author, speaker, YouTuber, and LGBTQ Christian activist known for his focus on building bridges between groups who disagree.

He is the author of Torn: Rescuing the Gospel from the Gays-vs.-Christians Debate and Talking Across the Divide: How to Communicate with People You Disagree With and Maybe Even Change the World, and the director of a 2009 documentary, Through My Eyes, which explores the struggles of young gay Christians.

He is the founder and former executive director of the Gay Christian Network, which he ran from 2001 to 2017, and Nuance Ministries, which he has run since 2017.

== Background ==
Lee grew up in a Southern Baptist Christian home and continued identifying as an evangelical even after coming out as gay.

In 1997, after struggling to reconcile his own faith and sexuality, Lee posted his story online and heard from others who were similarly struggling. This led him to be more outspoken on behalf of LGBT Christians.

== Involvement with the Gay Christian Network ==
In August 2001, Lee launched the Gay Christian Network (GCN), first as a small online community of gay Christians, and then as a 501(c)(3) nonprofit organization to provide resources and support to lesbian, gay, bisexual, and transgender Christians. The organization was notable for its welcoming of "Side B" gay and bi Christians who abstain from same-sex sexual relationships, despite Lee's own "Side A" (affirming) views. In an interview for CNN, Lee explained:

We're just trying to get people together who experience attraction to the same sex, however they have handled that, and who love Jesus and say, OK, you are welcome here, and then let's pray together and figure out where God wants us to take it.

In 2007, Lee discussed the organization's origins as an online community:

The Internet has made a huge difference in creating a movement [...]. What at first might have seemed a little fringe group is then able to gain momentum as people meet others and discover they’re not alone.

By 2016, the organization had grown to the point that its conference was being promoted as "the largest annual LGBT Christian event" with an attendance of "1,500+ LGBT Christians and allies."

In 2017, Lee and the GCN board of directors announced in a joint statement that he would be leaving the organization "due to irreconcilable differences about the direction and future of the organization," and that the organization's name would soon be changing. The organization later rebranded as Q Christian Fellowship, though Lee has distanced himself from the new incarnation, calling it "an entirely different organization."

After his departure from GCN, Lee said he intended to continue doing LGBT Christian activism and announced the formation of a new nonprofit called Nuance Ministries.

== Fight against reparative therapy ==
Lee has been an outspoken critic of the "ex-gay" or "reparative therapy" movement.

In his book Torn, he discussed his own experience with the "ex-gay" movement in the 1990s, writing that "therapy can't make gay people straight...what's typically happening is behavior change, not orientation (that is, attraction) change."

In 2006, he appeared on the Dr. Phil Show to argue that attempting to change someone's orientation does not work.

In 2012, Lee held a public conversation with Alan Chambers, then the president of "ex-gay" organization Exodus International, in which Lee argued that Exodus was hurting people and being dishonest about their results. Chambers then admitted that

The majority of people whom I have met, and I would say the majority meaning 99.9 percent of them, have not experienced a change in their orientation or have gotten to a place where they can say that they could never be tempted or are not tempted in some way, or experience some level of same-sex attraction.

A year later, when Exodus announced that they would be closing, Lee wrote, "As a Christian, I grew up believing groups like Exodus could make me straight. Even years after I realized that didn't work, I continued to hear from friends and family who pushed me to keep trying to change my orientation. Exodus's announcement today is the acknowledgement many of us have been waiting to hear for a long, long time."

== "Side A"/"Side B" dialogue ==
Lee engages in frequent public dialogues with Spiritual Friendship co-founders Ron Belgau and Wesley Hill in which Lee takes a "Side A" position (arguing for monogamous same-sex relationships) and Belgau or Hill takes a "Side B" position (arguing for celibacy).

== Other notable details ==
Lee is recognizable for his baldness and noticeable lack of eyebrows due to alopecia areata, a condition he has had since childhood.

== Books ==
- Torn: Rescuing the Gospel from the Gays-vs.-Christians debate (Jericho Books, 2012)
- Talking Across the Divide: How to Communicate with People You Disagree with and Maybe Even Change the World (TarcherPerigee, 2018)

== See also ==
- Religion and homosexuality
- History of Christianity and homosexuality
- Queer Theology
- Category:LGBTQ religious organizations
- Side A, Side B, Side X, and Side Y (theological views)
