= Q Christian Fellowship =

Christian ministry

- Abbreviation: QCF
- Formation: August 2001
- Legal status: Nonprofit Charity
- Purpose: Religious, LGBTQ
- Headquarters: Denver, Colorado
- Region served: Worldwide
- Executive Director: Bukola Landis-Aina
- Budget: US $957,933.66 (FY2019–2020, including Conference)
- Website: QChristian.org

The Q Christian Fellowship (QCF) is an ecumenical Christian ministry focused on serving lesbian, gay, bisexual, transgender, queer, and straight ally Christians. It was founded in 2001 as the Gay Christian Network (GCN) by Justin Lee and is currently administered from Denver, Colorado. It was re-branded in 2018 to better reflect the diversity of the ministry and community they serve. According to the re-branding documents, the 'Q' does not correlate to any particular word. Instead, it is just the letter 'Q' open for interpretation.

The organization operates an online community "safe space" for social networking and support; hosts the Q Christian Fellowship Conference, the world's largest annual LGBTQ+ Christian conference with over 1,300 attendees each January; organizes regional small groups; and produces resources including the Unchanged Movement, the upcoming Affirmation and Relational Guides, devotionals, online chat forums, age-block groups, the annual Parent Summit, and online.

The organization's stated mission is to "cultivate radical belonging among LGBTQ+ people and allies through a commitment to growth, community, and relational justice."

== Early years (2001–2017) ==
GCN was founded in 2001 as an online community to provide support to gay Christians. Founder Justin Lee had struggled for years to reconcile his own Christian faith with his sexuality, so he set up GCN as a way to support others in similar situations.

As the organization grew, its mission expanded. In 2008, GCN officially adopted five "missional directions": promoting spiritual growth, cultivating safe community, supporting family and friends, educating and encouraging the church, and engaging the wider LGBT community and the world.

Lee has said that GCN aims "to change hearts and minds in the church, and to provide support to parents and to pastors as they are wrestling with these issues in their own families and congregations."

== Re-branding and expansion (2017–present) ==
On July 19, 2017, it was announced that GCN and Justin Lee went their separate ways.

Due to irreconcilable differences about the direction and future of the organization, Justin Lee and the GCN Board of Directors have agreed to his amicable separation from the organization. Justin Lee will no longer serve as the executive director of GCN, effective May 4, 2017. Neither Justin nor the Board will publicly discuss the reasons behind Justin's departure other than to affirm that it was a practical business decision intended to allow for the growth of this important work.

In January 2018, the new name Q Christian Fellowship was adopted, and the conference was held in Chicago for the second time the following year.

In May 2019, former board member and Co-Executive Director Bukola Landis-Aina became the Executive Director for the organization. In June 2019, following Bethel Church's promotion of an ex-gay group called the Changed Movement, Q Christian launched the Unchanged Movement, an initiative developed as an "affirmative counter to the damage wrought in the name of God through ex-gay theologies and philosophies". The organization began advocating against the use of conversion therapy and ex-gay rhetoric in the Church, leveraging their platform to offer resources, amplify LGBTQ+ Christian stories, and illumine the myths often propagated by ex-gay leaders in the past. In August, Q Christian issued an open letter to the city government of Orlando requesting they condemn the Freedom March, a gathering of "former homosexuals" and "transgenders" scheduled for September 14 in Lake Eloa Park.

== Theology ==
Members of Q Christian Fellowship have a diverse set of theological beliefs from very liberal to very conservative.

The organization's "Statement of Faith" is broadly consistent with orthodox Christian beliefs, asserting the existence of one God, the divinity of Christ, salvation by grace through faith, the Bible as the authoritative word of God, and the importance of living holy lives in service to God.

Beyond that, the organization does not take public stands on most theological issues; instead, it offers support to individuals in a wide variety of Christian sects and denominations, including but not restricted to Anglican/Episcopalian, Baptist, Catholic, Disciples of Christ, Eastern Orthodox, Lutheran, Methodist, Metropolitan Community Church, Pentecostal and other Charismatic churches, Presbyterian, Quaker, Seventh-day Adventist, United Church of Christ, and unaffiliated/nondenominational Christians.

== Sex and Christianity ==
Former logo of QCF while it was GCN

Members of Q Christian Fellowship have expressed a wide variety of opinions concerning lesbian, gay, bisexual and transgender life and how it should be lived from a Christian perspective. For instance, the site is committed to being a safe haven both for members who believe it is okay for gay Christians to enter into healthy, committed relationships (including sex) and for those who believe that the Bible prohibits such behavior and requires chastity. On the site, these two positions were nicknamed Side A, i.e., those members who believe that homosexual activity is not sinful, and Side B, i.e., those who believe that God does love gay people but does not accept homosexual activity.

The Side A members are not advocating promiscuity or other casual sexual behaviors; many of them are looking for a monogamous, marital relationship (e.g. a civil union). Similarly, the Side B members are not advocating an ex-gay position; many of them believe that God is not asking them to change their sexual orientation, but simply that they remain sexually chaste. As the site described the two sides:

Here at GCN, we have two types of gay Christians. On one side are those who are in gay relationships or hope to be someday. On the other side are those who view their same-sex attractions as a temptation, and strive to live celibate lives. We call these views Side A and Side B, and both are well-represented at GCN.

Although both sides have strong contingents on the site, many members have not fully decided which side they belong to. For these members, the site provides a safe place in which to think through these issues and the resources to help people make informed decisions. Another example of the variety of opinions is that many Side A members on the site choose to remain sexually abstinent until they are in a committed relationship and/or legal marriage. These types of beliefs exemplify the conflicts that some gay Christians have encountered with the mainstream gay community.

== The QCF Conference ==
According to Q Christian Fellowship, its conference is the largest annual LGBT Christian event in the world. The conference includes a wide variety of workshops that explore the LGBT and Christian landscapes, particularly where they intersect. The most recent conference in 2020 was Fort Lauderdale, Florida. The 2021 conference was originally scheduled to be held during January 7–10 in Albuquerque, New Mexico. At the end of July 2020, it was announced that the event would still take place but due to issues related to Covid 19 would be hosted virtually. Dr Emilie M Townes, Dr Robyn Henderson-Espinoza and Father Richard Rohr are scheduled to be keynote speakers. The 2022 conference was scheduled to take place in Albuquerque, New Mexico, January 20–23 but due to the rise of the Omicron variant of Covid, it was announced at the end of 2021 that this would also be a virtual conference only.

In 2022, the QCF conference was held in Washington, DC, during January 5–8. It took on a new look as both a face-to face gathering and offering virtual attendance using WHOVA as a platform.

=== Workshops ===
The workshops cover topics from a broad spectrum of Christian belief and LGBTQ life. The overall theme for workshops is the intersectionality of Christianity and being an LGBTQ person. The plenary session speakers are given a chance to present workshops to expand on topics not discussed in the larger session.

Some past workshops have discussed:

- The Bible and Homosexuality
- Support for Parents
- Resources for Pastors and Churches
- Race and Intersectionality
- Making a Real-World Impact
- The Trans Community and the Church
- Supporting LGBT Youth
- Side B and Celibacy
- Couples' Communication
- Prayer and Spiritual Growth
- Responding to Homophobia

=== Speakers ===
The Q Christian Fellowship Conference attracts keynote speakers and performers from a variety of perspectives, known nationally and internationally for their faith work. Past conferences have included names such as Philip Yancey, the late Rachel Held Evans, Vicky Beeching, Jeff Chu, Peter Gomes, Tony Campolo, and more.

The 2020 Conference in Fort Lauderdale included civil rights activist DeRay McKesson, Dr. Pamela Lightsey, Rev. Nicole Garcia, and a variety of Affinity Group leaders as well as Breakout Session presenters.

=== Concerts ===
Since 2014, the conference has highlighted Christian LGBTQ or affirming performers with an evening concert. Past concerts have included Mary Lambert, who was featured on Macklemore's "Same Love" single, and Gungor.

== Financial support ==
In the United States, Q Christian Fellowship, like most churches, is an Internal Revenue Code 501(c)(3) non-profit organization that provides resources and support to its members. Like church membership, people participate in the ministry without financial cost. Members and supporters can choose to offer financial support for administration and programming through one-time and/or recurring free-will donations.

== Reception in the media ==
The ministry gained national attention with the founder's appearance on the Dr. Phil television program's Gay-to-Straight Debate in 2006 where Lee argued against conversion therapy. Lee debated an ordained priest who was a former prostitute who claimed sexual reorientation therapy works. Lee and the organization's website were also featured in the opening paragraphs of the New York Times front-page article "Gay and Seeking a Place Among Evangelicals".

The organization's website has become so well-known that it was recently mentioned as a resource in the syndicated advice column Annie's Mailbox, written by two former editors for Ann Landers. The column lists QCF alongside such denominational gay Christian groups as IntegrityUSA (Episcopalian), DignityUSA (Catholic), Seventh Day Adventist Kinship International, the GLBT-focused Metropolitan Community Church denomination, and PFLAG, the nation's largest support network for parents, siblings, children and friends of GLBT individuals.

The ministry has also been mentioned (often alongside or through an interview with Lee) in articles on gay Christians and their fight for inclusion in the church, such as the article "Progressive Christians see hope for gay marriage" and the Associated Press article "Gays, lesbians join the chastity movement," which interviews members of the site's "Waiting for Marriage" group. The ministry's annual conference was featured as part of an article on the gay Christian rock group Canaan, some of whose members are also regular contributors to the site. QCF members have been featured on the LOGO TV series Be Real and in Out magazine.

== See also ==
- LGBT-welcoming church programs
- Religion and homosexuality
- History of Christianity and homosexuality
- Side B Christian
- Side A, Side B, Side X, Side Y (theological views)
