= Mortification (theology) =

Doctrine in Christian theology

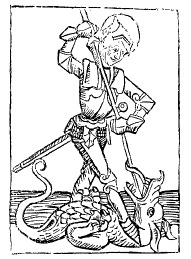
Wood carving of St George and the Dragon.

In Christian theology, mortification is the subjective process of sanctification, drawn from the killing of sin in a believer's life, as discussed by Paul the Apostle: "Put to death therefore what is earthly in you: sexual immorality, impurity, passion, evil desire, and covetousness, which is idolatry" (Colossians 3:5).

== Theological distinctions ==
=== Catholic theology ===
Catholic theology frames mortification within the believer's personal struggle against sin. According to the Catholic Encyclopedia: "What it slays is the disease of the soul, and by slaying this it restores and invigorates the soul's true life." Mortification is also practiced by some Catholic subgroups for the purpose of saving sinners from hell, as devotees of Our Lady of Fátima believe the Virgin Mary asked her child visionaries to do.

=== Evangelical and Reformed theology ===
John Calvin observed that if believers died with Jesus then He would destroy our sinful earthly members and their lust, "so that they may no longer perform their functions". Mortification in Reformed theology has been generally understood to be the subjective experience of sanctification. Reformed theologian J.I. Packer describes it in the following way: "The Christian is committed to a lifelong fight against the world, the flesh and the devil. Mortification is his assault on the second."

== See also ==
- Sanctification
- Regeneration (theology)
- Holy Spirit
