= Religion and LGBTQ people =

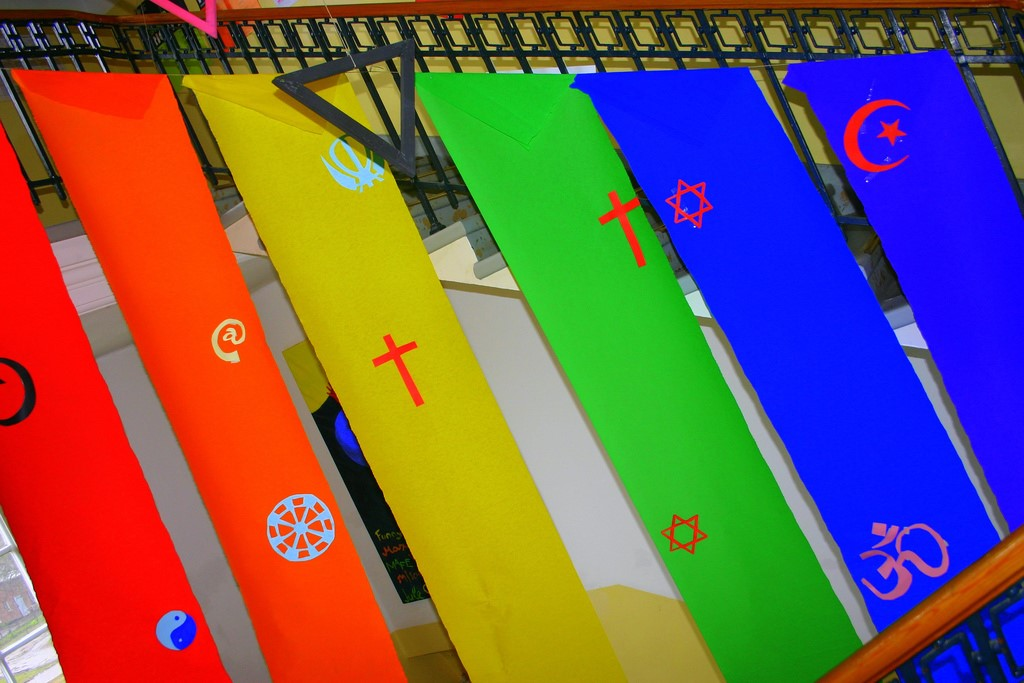
Symbols of the world's largest religions displayed on rainbow flags at the Queer Easter, Germany

Religions intersect with LGBTQ people through a range of beliefs, practices, and organizational policies that shape experiences of romantic orientation and relationships including same-sex couples, sexual orientation, gender identity and expression, and participation in social and religious life.

The relationship between religion and sexual orientation, romantic orientation, and gender identity varies widely across traditions and communities. In many cases, understandings of romance, gender, and sexuality do not align with modern Western LGBTQ categories, reflecting different cultural and historical perspectives.

Within both historic and contemporary religious traditions, views on LGBTQ people vary widely. These range from full support from LGBTQ-affirming religious groups, including affirmation of diverse sexual and romantic orientations, gender identities and expressions, and same sex marriage, to opposition, including condemnation that can extend from social exclusion explicitly forbidding same-sex sexual activities and/or gender reassignment among adherents, actively opposing social acceptance of LGBTQ identities to the criminalization and violence against LGBTQ people, such as the death penalty for people engaging in homosexual practices. Adherence to anti-gay religious beliefs and communities is correlated with the prevalence of emotional distress and suicidality in LGBTQ minority individuals.

Some religions and traditions may affirm certain members of the LGBTQ community while rejecting others, for example supporting gay rights while opposing transgender rights, or accepting gender diversity while condemning same sex relationships.

Historically, some cultures and religions accommodated, institutionalized, revered and/or tolerated same-sex relationships and non-heterosexual identities; such mythologies and traditions can be found in numerous religions around the world; elements of religious and cultural incorporation of non-heterosexual identities can still be identified in traditions that have survived into the modern era, such as the Berdache, Hijra, and Xanith.

Regardless of their position on LGBTQ, many people of faith look to both sacred texts and tradition for guidance on this issue. However, the authority of various traditions or scriptural passages and the correctness of translations and interpretations are continually disputed.

== Scholarship on LGBTQ people and religion ==
Attitudes toward homosexuality have been found to be determined not only by personal religious beliefs, but by the interaction of those beliefs with the predominant national religious context—even for people who are less religious or who do not share their local dominant religious context.

Within the social sciences, religious practice and institutions have been studied for their role in orienting heteronormative societies in how they relate to LGBTQ people and same-sex couples, and their abilities to be functional beings in societal contexts.

== Religious views of LGBTQ people ==
Symbols of the world religions, highlighted by the rainbow Pride flag

According to a 2006 Australian survey, LGBTIQ+ people in Australia, compared to the general Australian population, were much more likely to report irreligiosity, much less likely to be affiliated with a Christian denomination, and more likely to be affiliated with a religion other than Christianity. The distribution of religions that LGBTQ Australians were raised in, however, was similar to that of the general population. Men—particularly bisexual men—were more likely to be Christians and to have stayed adherent to the religion they were raised in. Lesbian women were more likely to have left the religion they were raised in and be currently unaffiliated.

A 2007 study on the beliefs of LGBTQ people in New Zealand found that 73% were irreligious, 14.8% were Christians, and 2.2% were Buddhists. In contrast, a 2001 census reported that 59.8% of New Zealanders were Christians and 29.2% were irreligious. A 2008 analysis showed that the proportion of LGBTQ individuals identifying as Christians in New Zealand had decreased, with the rate of disaffiliation among LGBTQ individuals who were previously Christian being 2.37 times higher than the general population.

The Radical Faeries is a worldwide queer spiritual movement founded in 1979 in the United States. Radical Faerie communities are generally inspired by aboriginal, native, or traditional spiritualities, especially those that incorporate queer sensibilities. A Williams Institute survey found that the majority of LGBTQ Americans were raised as Christians and predominantly Protestant. A 2024 survey of LGBTQ Americans found that more than 50% were raised as Protestants and in Pentecostalism.

== Religious groups and public policy ==
Opposition to same-sex marriage and LGBTQ rights is often associated with conservative religious views. The American Family Association, an American right-wing Christian group, and other religious groups have promoted boycotts of corporations whose policies support the LGBTQ community.

On the other hand, the Unitarian Universalist Association supports LGBTQ individuals' freedom to marry, comparing resistance to marriage equality to resistance to the abolition of slavery, women's suffrage, and the end of anti-miscegenation laws.

LGBTQ individuals often endure significant challenges in Islamic countries, which frequently have laws that explicitly criminalize same-sex sexual behavior. In Islamic countries, Sharia may be interpreted to condemn males who engage in same-sex behavior to death—a violation of human rights per international human rights experts and organizations, including Amnesty International.

In conservative Islamic nations, laws generally prohibit same-sex sexual behaviour, and interpretation of Sharia Law on male homosexuality carries the death penalty. This has been condemned as a violation of human rights by human rights organisation Amnesty International and by the writers of the Yogyakarta principles. With the US's signature in 2009, the proposed UN declaration on LGBTQ rights had been signed by 67 members of the United Nations, including all 27 European Union members as well as Japan, Australia, and Mexico. The Human Rights Watch website published an article in 2008 that includes the remainder of the 67 signatories. Muslim nations put forward an opposing statement, and 60 member states have signed this as of March 2009, the majority being in Africa and Asia. Sixty-five out of the total 192 countries have not yet signed either statement as of 2009. In 2011 the United Nations Human Rights Council passed a landmark resolution initiated by South Africa supporting LGBT rights (See Sexual Orientation and Gender Identity at the United Nations).

== Views of specific religions ==
=== Abrahamic religions ===
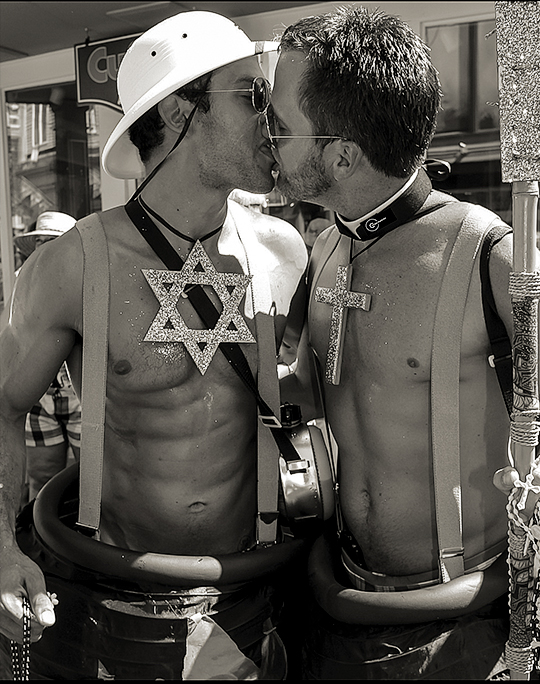
Two men kissing at a pride event while wearing symbols of two Abrahamic religions

Abrahamic religions (namely Judaism, Samaritanism, Christianity, the Baháʼí Faith, and Islam) have traditionally affirmed and endorsed a patriarchal and heteronormative approach towards human sexuality, favouring exclusively penetrative vaginal intercourse between men and women within the boundaries of marriage over all other forms of human sexual activity, including autoeroticism, masturbation, oral sex, non-penetrative and non-heterosexual sexual intercourse (all of which have been labeled as "sodomy" at various times), believing and teaching that such behaviors are forbidden because they are considered sinful, and further compared to or derived from the behavior of the alleged residents of Sodom and Gomorrah. However, the status of LGBTQ people in early Christianity and early Islam is debated.

The Abrahamic religions have traditionally forbidden sodomy, believing and teaching that such behavior is sinful. Today some denominations within these religions are accepting of homosexuality and inclusive of homosexual people, such as Reform Judaism, the United Church of Christ and the Metropolitan Community Church. Some Presbyterian, Anglican, Lutheran, and Methodist churches welcome members regardless of same-sex sexual practices, with some provinces allowing for the ordination and inclusion of gay and lesbian clerics, and affirmation of same-sex unions. Reform Judaism incorporates lesbian and gay rabbis and same-sex marriage liturgies, while Reconstructionist Judaism and Conservative Judaism in the US allows for lesbian and gay rabbis and same-sex unions.

==== Judaism ====
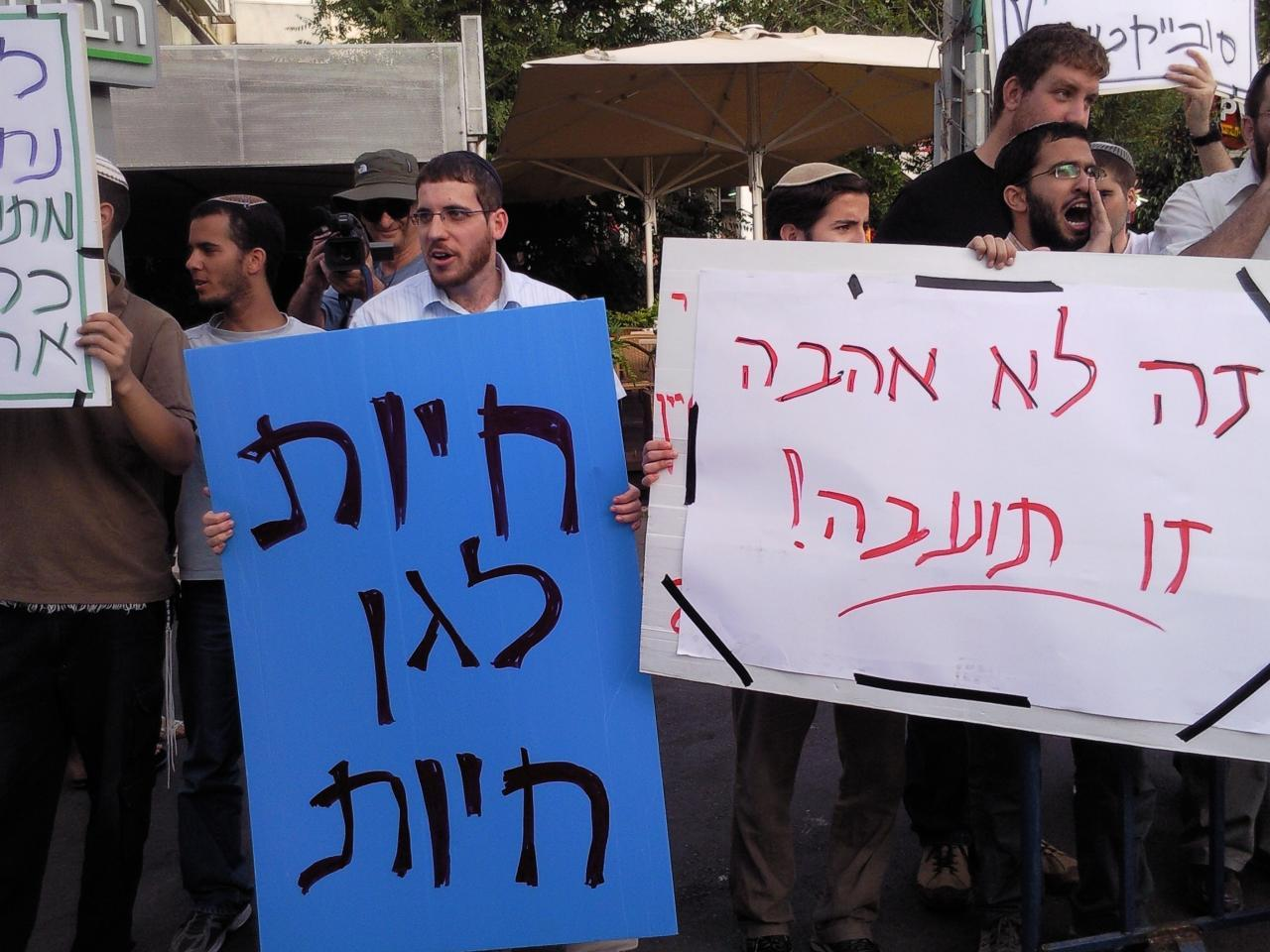
Orthodox Jewish protesters holding Anti-LGBTQ Protest signs during the Gay Pride parade in Haifa, Israel (2010)

The Torah (first five books of the Hebrew Bible) is the primary source for Jewish views on homosexuality. It states that: "[A man] shall not lie with another man as [he would] with a woman, it is תועבה (to'eba, "abomination")" (Leviticus 18:22). (Like many similar commandments, the stated punishment for willful violation is the death penalty, although in practice rabbinic Judaism no longer believes it has the authority to implement death penalties.)

Orthodox Judaism views homosexual acts as sinful. In recent years, there have been approaches claiming that only the sexual anal act is forbidden and considered an abomination by the Torah, while sexual orientation and even other sexual activities are not considered a sin. Conservative Judaism has engaged in an in-depth study of homosexuality since the 1990s, with various rabbis presenting a wide array of responsa (papers with legal arguments) for communal consideration. The official position of the movement is to welcome homosexual Jews into their synagogues, and also campaign against any discrimination in civil law and public society, but also to uphold a ban on anal sex as a religious requirement.

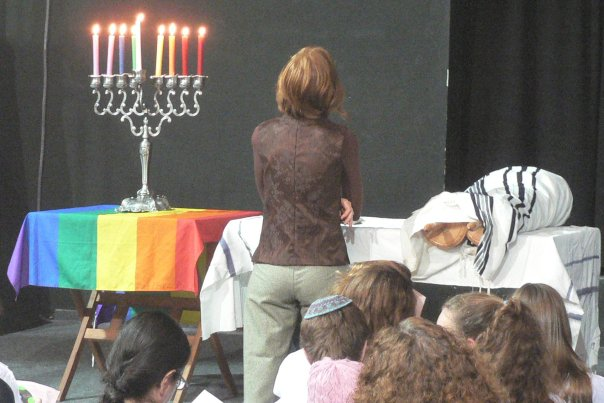
A halakhic egalitarian Pride minyan in Tel Aviv on the second Shabbat of Hanukkah with a rainbow menorah

Reform Judaism and Reconstructionist Judaism in North America and Progressive Judaism in the United Kingdom view homosexuality to be acceptable on the same basis as heterosexuality. Progressive Jewish authorities believe either that traditional laws against homosexuality are no longer binding or that they are subject to changes that reflect a new understanding of human sexuality. Some of these authorities rely on modern biblical scholarship suggesting that the prohibition in the Torah was intended to ban coercive or ritualized male-male sex, such as those practices ascribed to Egyptian and Canaanite fertility cults and temple prostitution.

The American branch of Conservative Judaism formally approves of same-sex marriage ceremonies. As of 1992 with the Report of the Reconstructionist Commission on Homosexuality, the Reconstructionist Movement of Judaism has expressed its support for same-sex marriages as well as the inclusion of gay and lesbian people in all aspects of Jewish life. The Jewish Reconstructionist Federation leaves the choice of whether or not to perform same-sex marriages to individual rabbis but the procedure is included in the Reconstructionist Rabbi's Manual and many choose to use the traditional language and symbols of kiddushin. Reform Judaism, the largest Jewish denomination in the United States, is generally supportive of LGBTQ rights and marriage.

==== Christianity ====
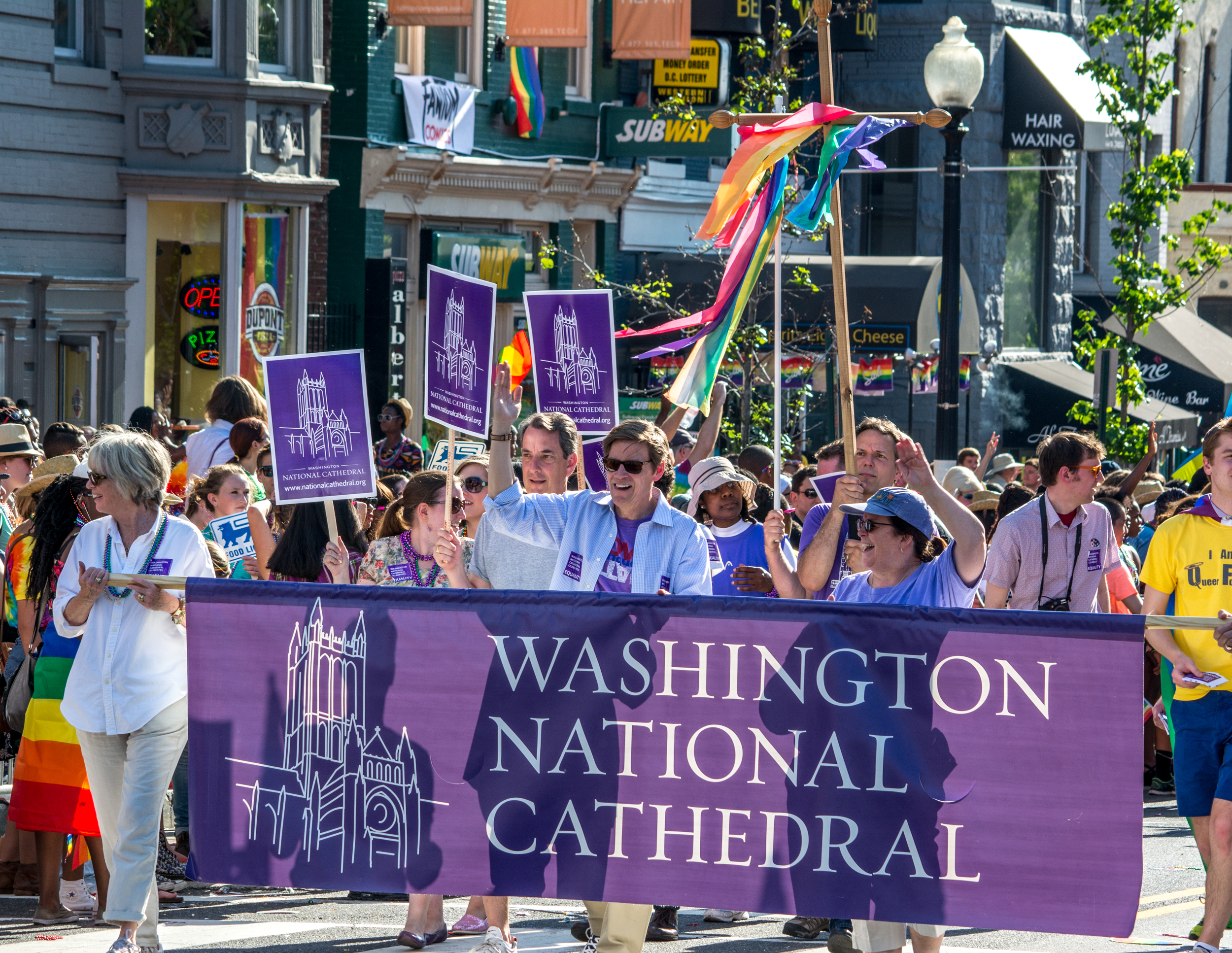
Washington National Cathedral (Episcopal Church in the United States) at D.C. Gay Pride (2014)

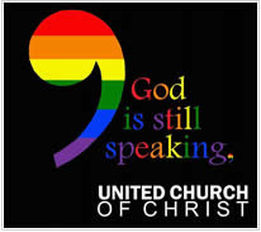
United Church of Christ's motto which expresses its support for LGBTQ rights

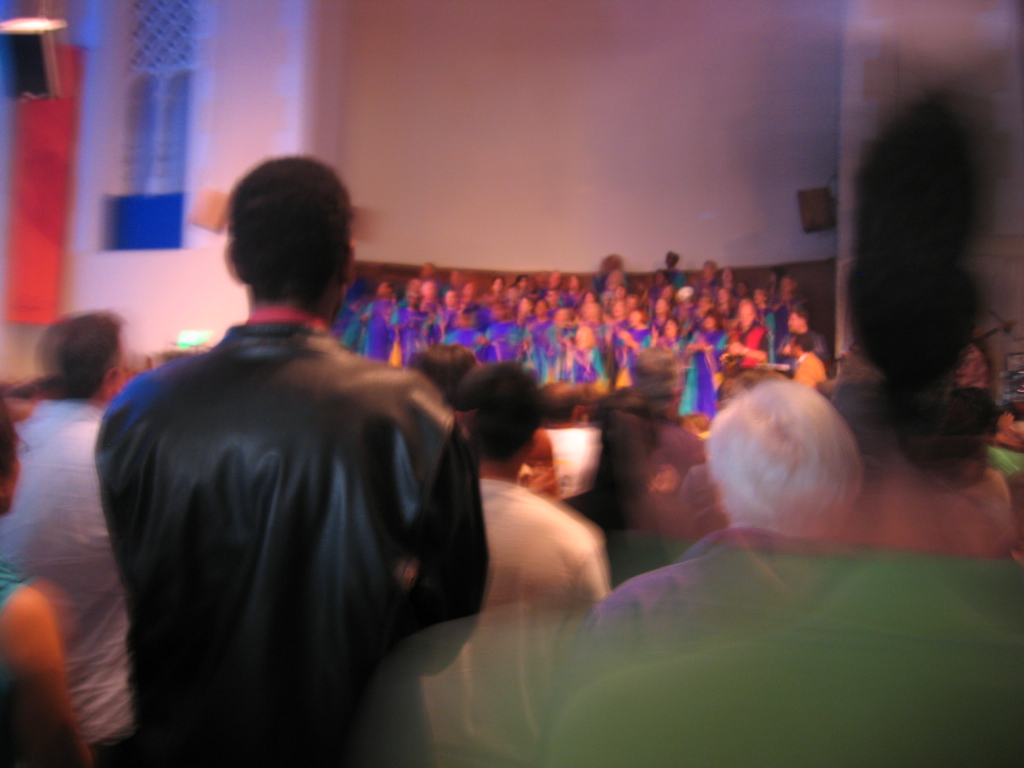
Scene during a church service at Glide Memorial Church, San Francisco, a church-place that is supportive to LGBTQ people

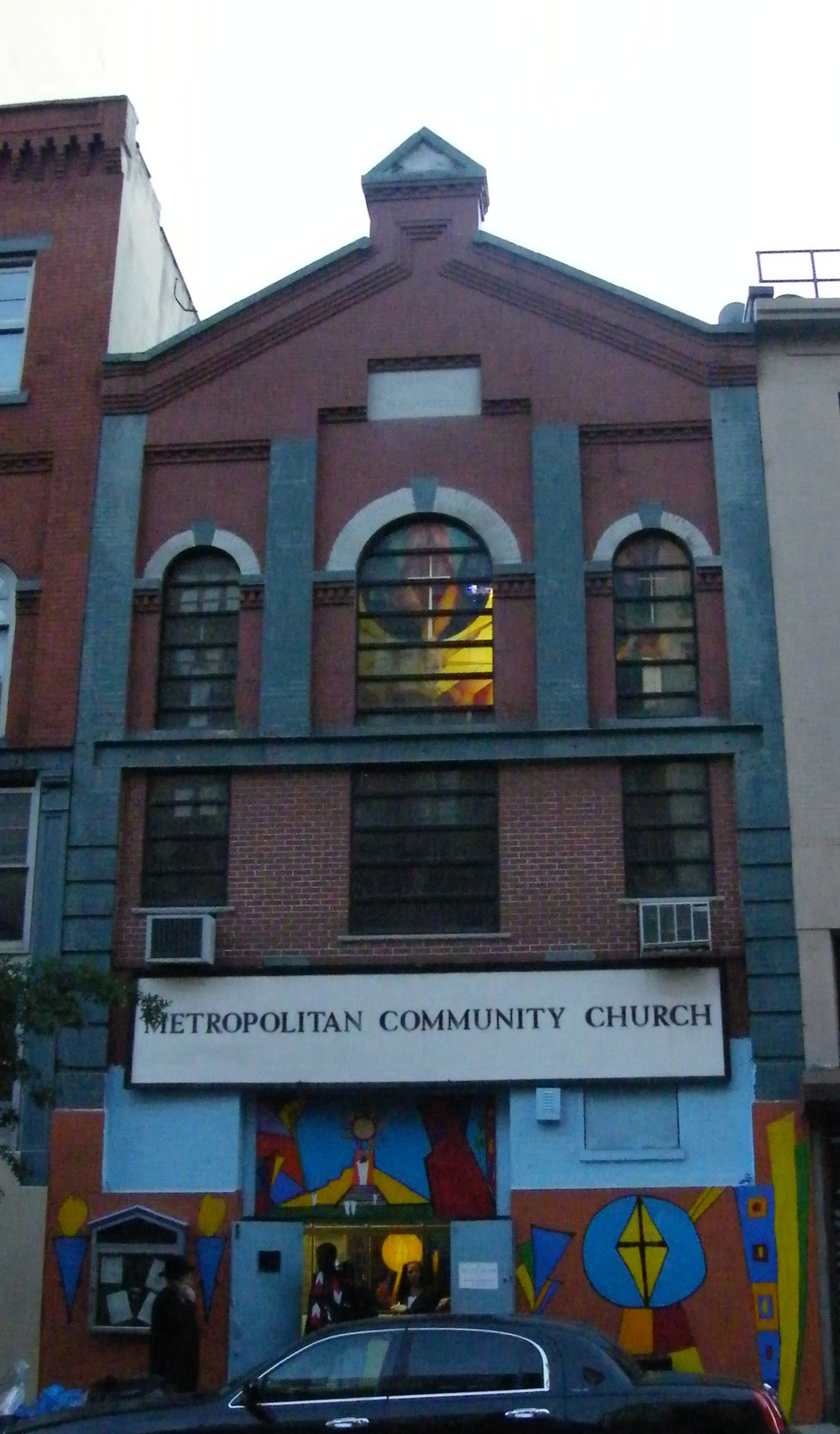
Metropolitan Community Church, an LGBT-affirming Christian church in New York City

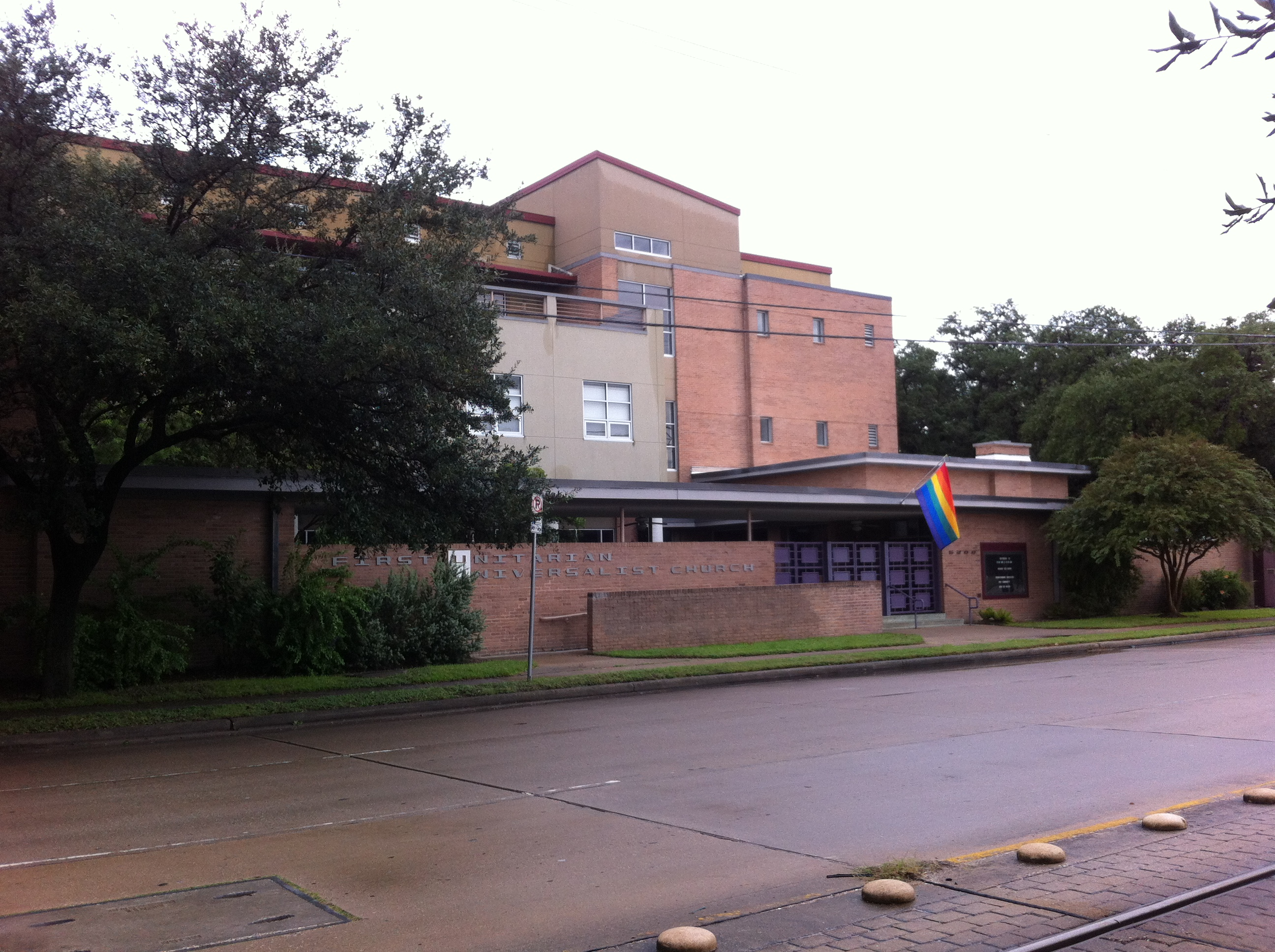
The LGBTQ flag at the First Unitarian Universalist Church in Houston indicates that the church welcomes LGBTQ-identifying people.

Throughout the majority of Christian history, most Christian theologians and denominations have considered homosexual behavior as immoral or sinful. Currently, Christian denominations have a variety of beliefs about LGBTQ people, and the moral status of same-sex sexual practices and gender variance. LGBTQ people may be barred from membership, accepted as laity, or ordained as clergy, depending on the denomination.

The Hebrew Bible/Old Testament and its traditional interpretations in Judaism and Christianity have historically affirmed and endorsed a patriarchal and heteronormative approach towards human sexuality, favouring exclusively penetrative vaginal intercourse between men and women within the boundaries of marriage over all other forms of human sexual activity, including autoeroticism, masturbation, oral sex, non-penetrative and non-heterosexual sexual intercourse (all of which have been labeled as "sodomy" at various times), believing and teaching that such behaviors are forbidden because they are considered sinful, and further compared to or derived from the behavior of the alleged residents of Sodom and Gomorrah.

Passages from the Mosaic Covenant and its broader Old Testament context have been interpreted to mean that anyone who is engaging in homosexual practices should be punished with death (Leviticus 20:13; cf. Genesis 19:4–25; Judges 19:22–20:48; 2 Peter 2:6–10; Jude 7). HIV/AIDS has also been portrayed by some Christian fundamentalists such as Fred Phelps and Jerry Falwell as a punishment by God against homosexuals. In the 20th century, theologians like Karl Barth, Jürgen Moltmann, Hans Küng, John Robinson, Bishop David Jenkins, Don Cupitt, and Bishop Jack Spong challenged traditional theological positions and understandings of the Bible; following these developments some have suggested that passages have been mistranslated, are taken out of context, or that they do not refer to what is generally understood as "homosexuality".

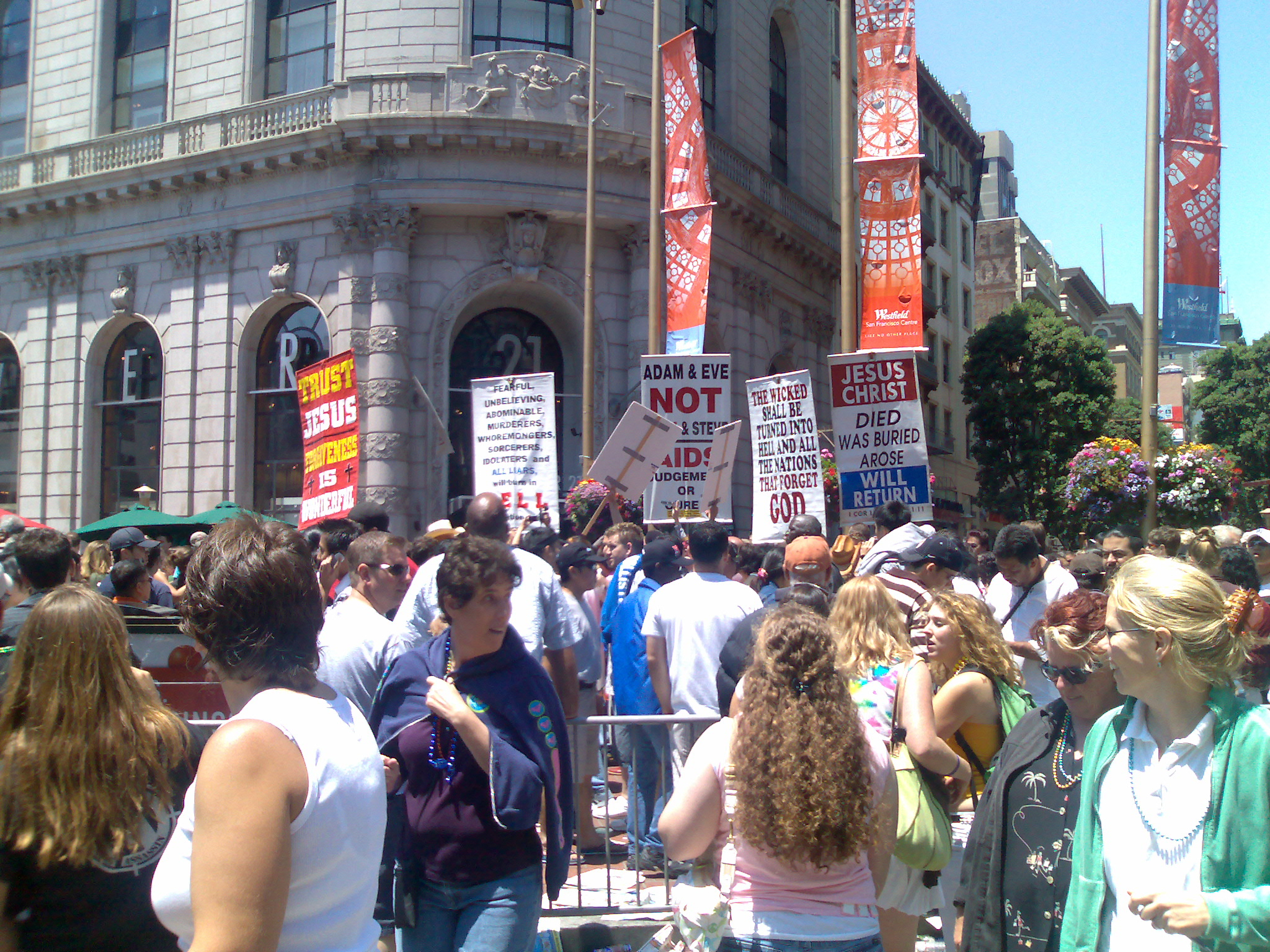
Conservative Christian protesters at a 2006 San Francisco Pride event

Christian denominations hold a variety of views on homosexual sex, ranging from outright condemnation to complete acceptance. Most Christian denominations welcome people attracted to the same sex, but teach that homosexual sex is sinful. These denominations include the Roman Catholic Church, the Eastern Orthodox church, the Oriental Orthodox churches, Confessional Lutheran denominations such as the Lutheran Church–Missouri Synod and the Wisconsin Evangelical Lutheran Synod, and some other mainline denominations, such as the Anglican Church in North America, Global Fellowship of Confessing Anglicans, Reformed Church in America, Presbyterian Church in America, Global Methodist Church, and the American Baptist Church, as well as Conservative Evangelical organizations and churches, such as the Evangelical Alliance, and fundamentalist groups and churches, such as the Southern Baptist Convention. Pentecostal churches such as the Assemblies of God, as well as Restorationist churches, like Iglesia ni Cristo, the Jehovah's Witnesses and the Church of Jesus Christ of Latter-day Saints, also take the position that homosexual sexual activity is sinful.

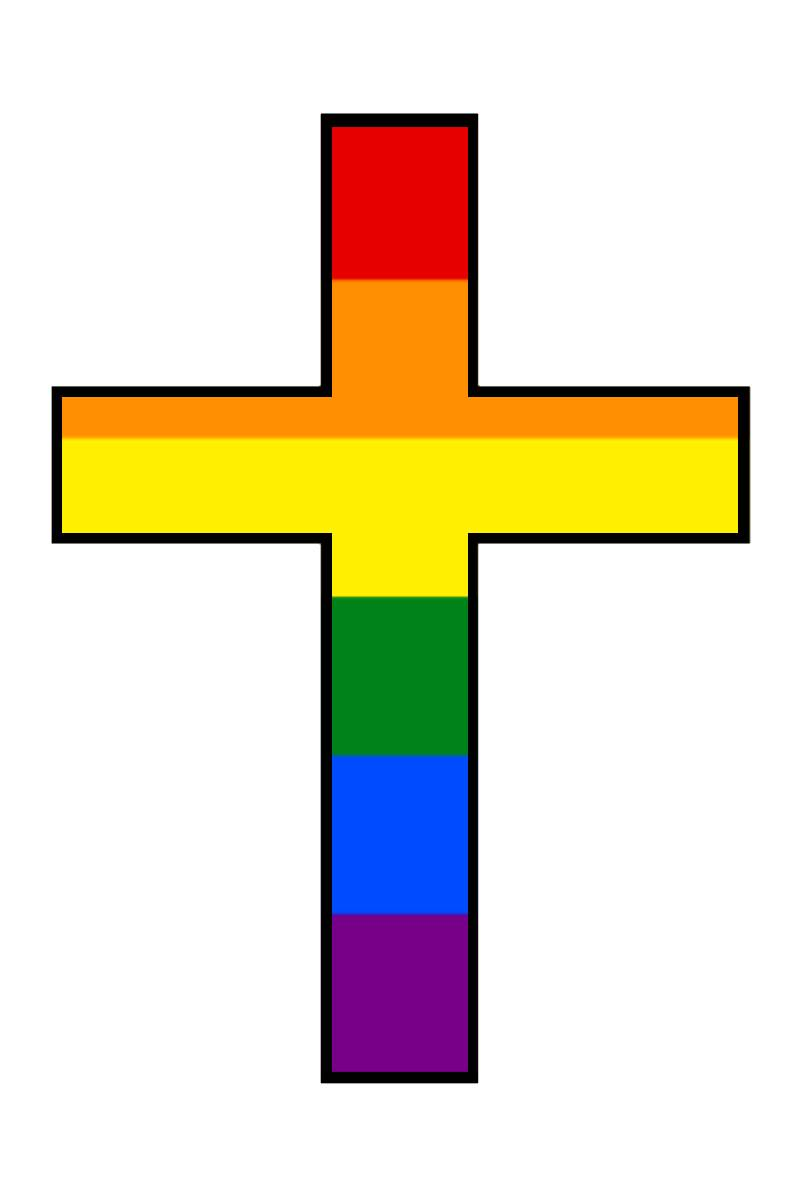
Symbolic depiction of the intersection of Christianity and LGBTQ people, combining the Christian cross and LGBTQ rainbow flag

Liberal Christians are generally supportive of homosexuals. Some Christian denominations do not view monogamous same sex relationships as bad or evil. These include the United Church of Canada, the United Church of Christ, the Episcopal Church, the Presbyterian Church (U.S.A.), the churches of the Old Catholic Union of Utrecht, the Evangelical Lutheran Church in America, the Evangelical Lutheran Church in Canada, the Church of Sweden, the Lutheran, reformed and united churches in Evangelical Church of Germany, the Church of Denmark, the Icelandic Church, the Church of Norway and the Protestant Church of the Netherlands. In particular, the Metropolitan Community Church, a denomination of 40,000 members, was founded specifically to serve the Christian LGBT community, and is devoted to being open and affirming to LGBTQ people. The United Church of Christ, the United Methodist Church (UMC) and the Alliance of Baptists also condone gay marriage, and some parts of the Anglican and Lutheran churches allow for the blessing of gay unions. Within the Anglican communion there are openly gay clergy; for example, Gene Robinson and Mary Glasspool are openly homosexual bishops in the US Episcopal Church and Eva Brunne in Lutheran Church of Sweden. The Episcopal Church's recent actions vis-a-vis homosexuality have brought about increased ethical debate and tension within the Church of England and worldwide Anglican churches. In the United States and many other nations, the religious people are becoming more affirming of same-sex relationships. Even those in denominations with official stances are liberalizing, though not as quickly as those in more affirming religious groups.

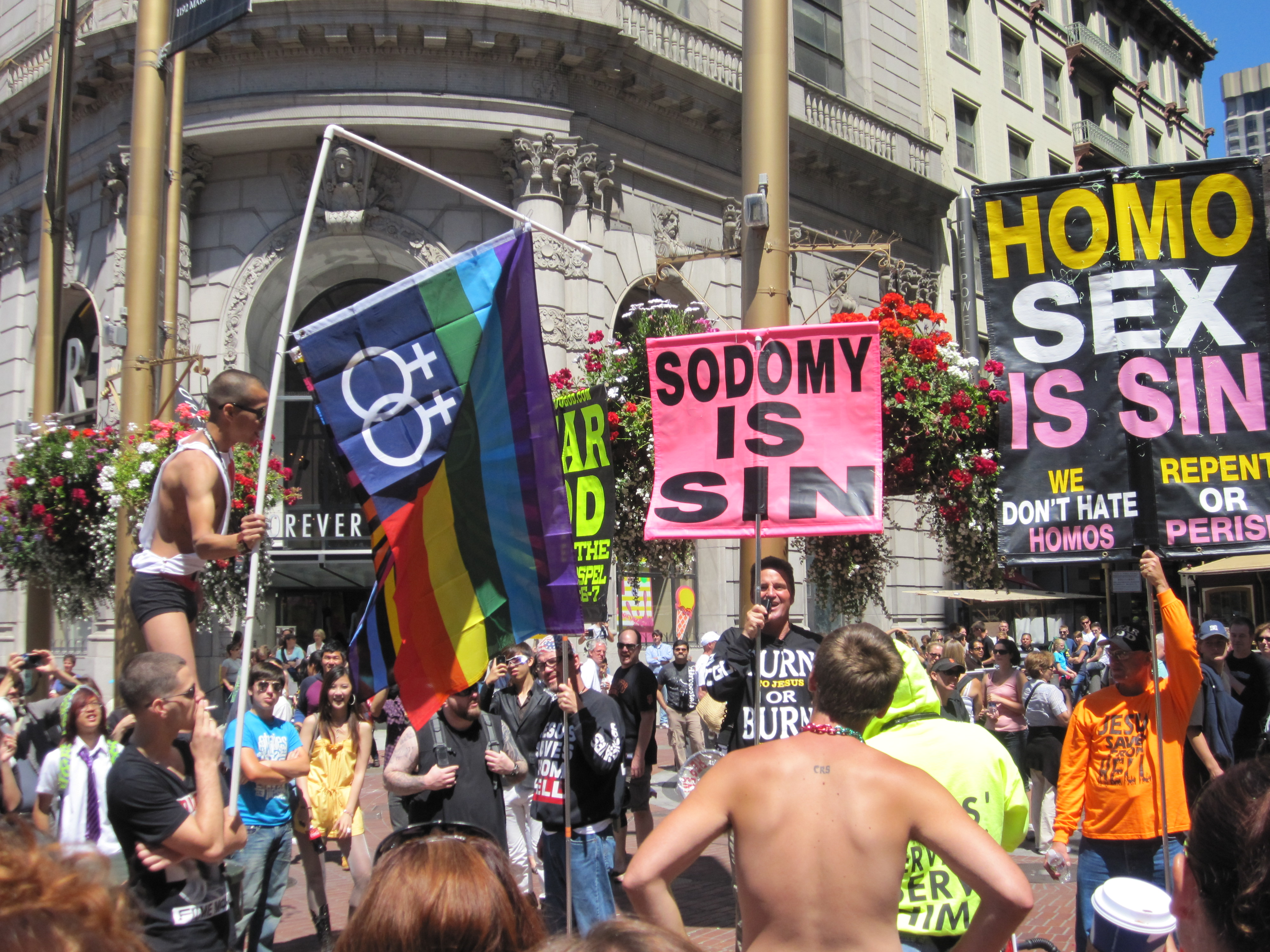
Religious protest against homosexuality in San Francisco

Conservative denominations generally oppose same-sex sexual relations based on Old Testament and New Testament texts that describe human sexual relations as strictly heterosexual by God's design. (Note: Passages used to support this view include Genesis 2:18–24; Genesis 1:26–28; Matthew 19:4–6; 1 Corinthians 7:1–40; and Ephesians 5:22–33.) As such, it is argued that sexual desires and actions that contradict God's design are deemed sinful and are condemned by God (e.g. Leviticus 18:22; cf. Leviticus 20:13). Since love does not rejoice in unrighteousness or iniquity (cf. 1 Corinthians 13:6), and since homosexual desires and actions are believed to remain contrary to God's design and condemned by God as sinful/iniquity (e.g. in general, Romans 126–27; passively, 1 Corinthians 6:96:9; actively, including but not limited to pederasty, 1 Corinthians 6:9; 1 Timothy 1:9-11; considered sexually immoral, Galatians 5:19-21; Colossians 3:5-7; Ephesians 5:3), adherents of conservative denominations believe that genuine love for God and humanity is best expressed by following God rather than the world (Acts 5:29; cf. Jeremiah 23:1-40; Romans 12:9).

The Catholic Church teaches that those who are attracted to persons of the same sex are called to practice chastity, just like everyone else has to before they get married. The Catholic Church does not regard homosexual activity as an expression of the marital sacrament, which it teaches is only possible within a lifelong commitment of a marriage between a man and a woman. According to the Church's sexual ethics, homosexual activity falls short in the complementarity (male and female organs complement each other) and fecundity (openness to new life) of the sexual act. Few studies of parishioners' individual views are sometimes at variance with the church's non-acceptance of homosexuality.

The Catholic Church welcomes people attracted to the same sex, while maintaining its teaching that homosexual relationships and acts are sinful. Despite this, a majority of Catholics in Western Europe and the US support same-sex marriage. The Roman Curia considers transgender individuals to be their biological sex and admits no distinction between "sex" and "gender". The Orthodox Church holds similar stances on same-sex attraction and conjugal relations. Protestant denominations have a wide range of views. Some denominations espouse similar views to Catholicism and Orthodoxy, and teach that all sexual relations outside of traditional marriage between a man and a woman are sinful, such as the Reformed Church in America, Southern Baptist Convention, The Church of Jesus Christ of Latter-day Saints and Jehovah's Witnesses.

While the Catholic view is founded on a natural law argument informed by scripture and proposed by Thomas Aquinas, the traditional conservative Protestant view is based on an interpretation of scripture alone. Protestant conservatives also see homosexual relationships as an impediment to heterosexual relationships. They interpret some Biblical passages to be commandments to be heterosexually married. Catholics, on the other hand, have accommodated unmarried people as priests, monks, nuns and single lay people for over 1,000 years. A number of self-described gay and 'ex-gay' Christians have reported satisfaction in mixed-orientation marriages.

Even within the scope of Christianity, the Jehovah's Witnesses (JW) denomination demonstrates some of the most intolerant views towards LGBTQ members and the larger LGBTQ community. Noted in its spiritual teachings, this religious organization instructs its members to suppress same-sex behaviors and feelings. The organization preaches that homosexuality (queerness) is a choice that can be rejected. Embracing queerness within the JW organization will result in disfellowshiping, which involves a public denouncement of the congregant and an expulsion from the congregation. In the Jehovah's witness branch of Christianity, LGBTQ is seen as something to be shamed. Within a study of 245 Jehovah's witnesses, 76% agreed that LGBTQ practices should be discouraged, while only 16% thought these ideas should be encouraged. The remaining 8% seemed to have no opinion or were neutral on the situation. Another study was conducted on Jehovah's witnesses with a range of ages from 18 to 29, 30–49, 50–64,65+. The majority of those who were against LGBTQ practices came from the 30–49 age range, with the percentage being 34%. Jehovah's witnesses can be 'disfellowshipped,' leading to ostracism from former support and social groups. 'Disfellowshipping' can occur if sin is committed that is seen as weighty and is not repented for. Homosexual or LGBTQ practices would fall under the category of a sin which could lead to disfellowshipping. Within a survey of 187 Jehovah's witnesses, 90% strongly opposed same-sex marriage and would classify it as something against their religion.

Other Christian churches, such as the Church of England, United Church of Canada, the United Church of Christ, the Presbyterian Church (U.S.A.), the Evangelical Lutheran Church in Canada, the Evangelical Lutheran Church in America, the Lutheran Church of Sweden, the Lutheran Church of Denmark, the Lutheran Church in Norway, the Lutheran Church of Iceland, the Protestant Church of the Netherlands, the United Protestant Church in Belgium, the United Protestant Church of France, the German Lutheran, Reformed and United Churches in Evangelical Church in Germany, the Old Catholic Church, the Anglican Church in Canada, the Episcopal Church in United States, and the Scottish Episcopal Church do not consider same-sex relations immoral, and will ordain LGBTQ clergy and celebrate blessings of same-sex marriages. Liberal Quakers, those in membership of Britain Yearly Meeting and Friends General Conference in the United States, approve of same-sex marriage and unions and conduct same-sex marriage ceremonies in the United Kingdom.

All homosexual or same-sex sexual activity is forbidden by the Church of Jesus Christ of Latter-day Saints (LDS Church) in its law of chastity, and the church teaches that God does not approve of same-sex marriage and may punish same-sex sexual behavior with a disciplinary council. Members of the church who experience homosexual attractions, including those who self-identify as gay, lesbian, or bisexual remain in good standing in the church if they abstain from same-sex marriage and all sexual relations outside an opposite-sex marriage, but all, including those participating in same-sex activity and relationships, are allowed to attend weekly church worship services. However, in order to receive church ordinances such as baptism, and to enter church temples, adherents are required to abstain from same-sex relations. Additionally, in the church's plan of salvation noncelibate gay and lesbian individuals will not be allowed in the top tier of heaven to receive exaltation unless they repent, and a heterosexual marriage is a requirement for exaltation.

The LDS Church previously taught that homosexuality was a curable condition and counseled members that they could and should change their attractions and provided therapy and programs with that goal. From 1976 until 1989 the Church Handbook called for church discipline for members attracted to the same sex equating merely being homosexual with the seriousness of acts of adultery and child molestation—even celibate gay people were subject to excommunication. Church publications now state that "individuals do not choose to have such attractions", its church-run therapy services no longer provides sexual orientation change efforts, and the church has no official stance on the causes of homosexuality. These current teachings and policies leave homosexual members with the options of entering a mixed-orientation opposite-sex marriage, or living a celibate lifestyle without any sexual expression (including masturbation).

==== Unification Church ====
Unification Church views heterosexual marriage which becomes "fruitful" by raising their children as God's ideal. Any other sexual relationship, than between husband and wife, is considered a sin. Unification Church founder Sun Myung Moon opposed homosexuality and free sex and in some of his speeches compared such relationships to "dirty dung filled water" and that "Satan and dirty dung-eating dogs go after that". He prophesied that "gays will be eliminated" in a "purge on God's orders".

==== Islam ====
Same-sex sexual activity illegal Not enforced or unclear Penalty Life in prison Death penalty on books but not applied Death penalty According to the ILGA seven countries still retain capital punishment for homosexual behavior: Saudi Arabia, Yemen (for adultery), Iran, Brunei, Afghanistan, Mauritania, and northern Nigeria.

Classical Islamic jurists did not deal with homosexuality as a sexual orientation, since the latter concept is modern and has no equivalent in traditional law, which dealt with it under the technical terms of liwata and zinā. Most legal schools treat homosexual intercourse with penetration similarly to unlawful heterosexual intercourse under the rubric of zinā, but there are differences of opinion with respect to methods of punishment, as evident from an eleventh-century discussion among the scholars of Baghdad, some scholars argued that homosexual desires are natural, but only allowed in the afterlife. Some gay individuals undergo sex reassignment surgery to transition into the opposite gender to legally marry.

The discourse on homosexuality in Islam is primarily concerned with activities between men. There are, however, a few hadiths that mention homosexual behavior among women. Although punishment for lesbianism is rarely mentioned in the histories, al-Tabari records an example of the execution in the year 170 AH (786 or 787 AD) of a pair of lesbian slavegirls in the harem of al-Hadi in a collection of highly critical anecdotes pertaining to that Caliph's actions as ruler.

Some jurists viewed sexual intercourse as possible only for an individual who possesses a phallus, hence those definitions of sexual intercourse that rely on the entry of as little as the corona of the phallus into a partner's orifice. Since women do not possess a phallus and, in this interpretation, cannot have intercourse with one another, they are therefore physically incapable of committing zinā.

Attitudes towards LGBTQ people and their experiences in the Muslim world have been influenced by its religious, legal, social, political, and cultural history. The religious stigma and sexual taboo associated with homosexuality in Islamic societies can have profound effects for those Muslims who self-identify as LGBTQ. Today, most LGBTQ-affirming Islamic organizations and individual congregations are primarily based in the Western world and South Asian countries; they usually identify themselves with the liberal and progressive movements within Islam.

Homosexual acts are forbidden in traditional Islamic jurisprudence and they are liable to different punishments, including flogging, stoning, and the death penalty, depending on the situation and legal school. However, homosexual relationships were generally tolerated in pre-modern Islamic societies, and historical records suggest that these laws were invoked infrequently, mainly in cases of rape or other "exceptionally blatant infringement on public morals". Public attitudes toward homosexuality in the Muslim world underwent a marked negative change starting from the 19th century through the global spread of Islamic fundamentalist movements such as Salafism and Wahhabism, and the influence of the sexual notions and restrictive norms prevalent in Europe at the time: a number of Muslim-majority countries have retained criminal penalties for homosexual acts enacted under European colonial rule.

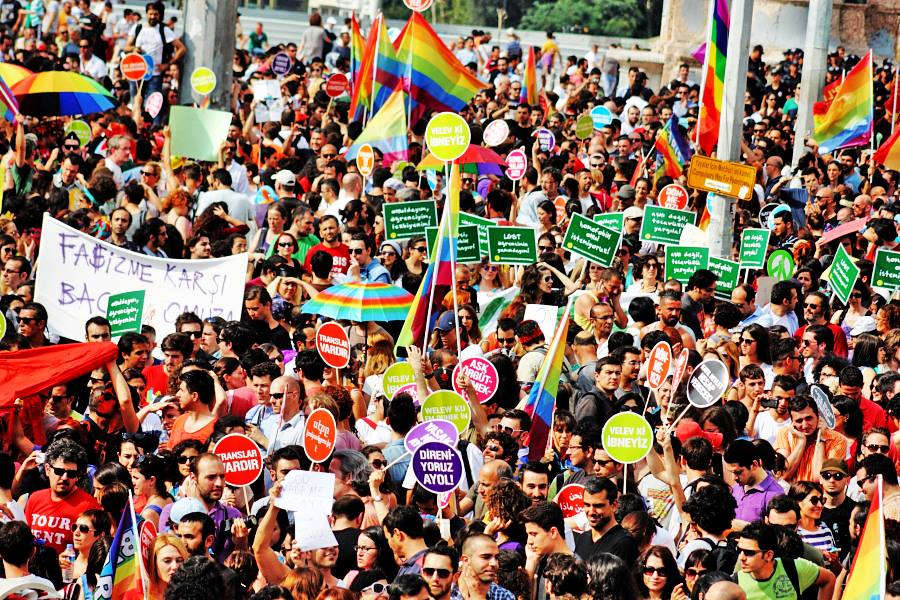
Istanbul LGBTQ Pride parade in 2013, Taksim Square, Istanbul, Turkey

In recent times, extreme prejudice, discrimination, and violence against LGBTQ people persists, both socially and legally, in much of the Muslim world, exacerbated by increasingly socially conservative attitudes and the rise of Islamist movements in Muslim-majority countries. There are laws against homosexual sexual activities in a large number of Muslim-majority countries, which prescribe the death penalty in a limited number of them.

Islamic views on homosexuality are also influenced by the rulings prescribed by the Quran and the teachings of the Islamic prophet Muhammad. The mainstream interpretation of some Quranic verses and hadith condemn sexual acts between members of the same sex, along with most forms of extramarital relations. In the late 1980s, Mufti Muhammad Sayyid Tantawy of Egypt issued a fatwa supporting the right for those who fit the description of mukhannathun to have sex reassignment surgery; Ayatollah Khomeini of Iran issued similar fatwas around the same time. Khomeini's initial fatwa concerned intersex individuals as well, but he later specified that sex reassignment surgery was also permissible in the case of transgender individuals.

Because homosexuality is illegal in Iran but being transgender is legal, some gay individuals have been forced to undergo sex reassignment surgery and transition into the opposite sex, regardless of their actual gender identity. Therefore, transgender people are generally more accepted, provided they conform to traditional gender norms post-transition; for example, the Iranian government not only allows and recognizes sex reassignment surgery, but also subsidizes the procedure for transgender citizens. In some regions of South Asia such as India, Bangladesh, and Pakistan, the hijras are officially recognized as a third gender that is neither male nor female, a concept that some have compared to mukhannathun.

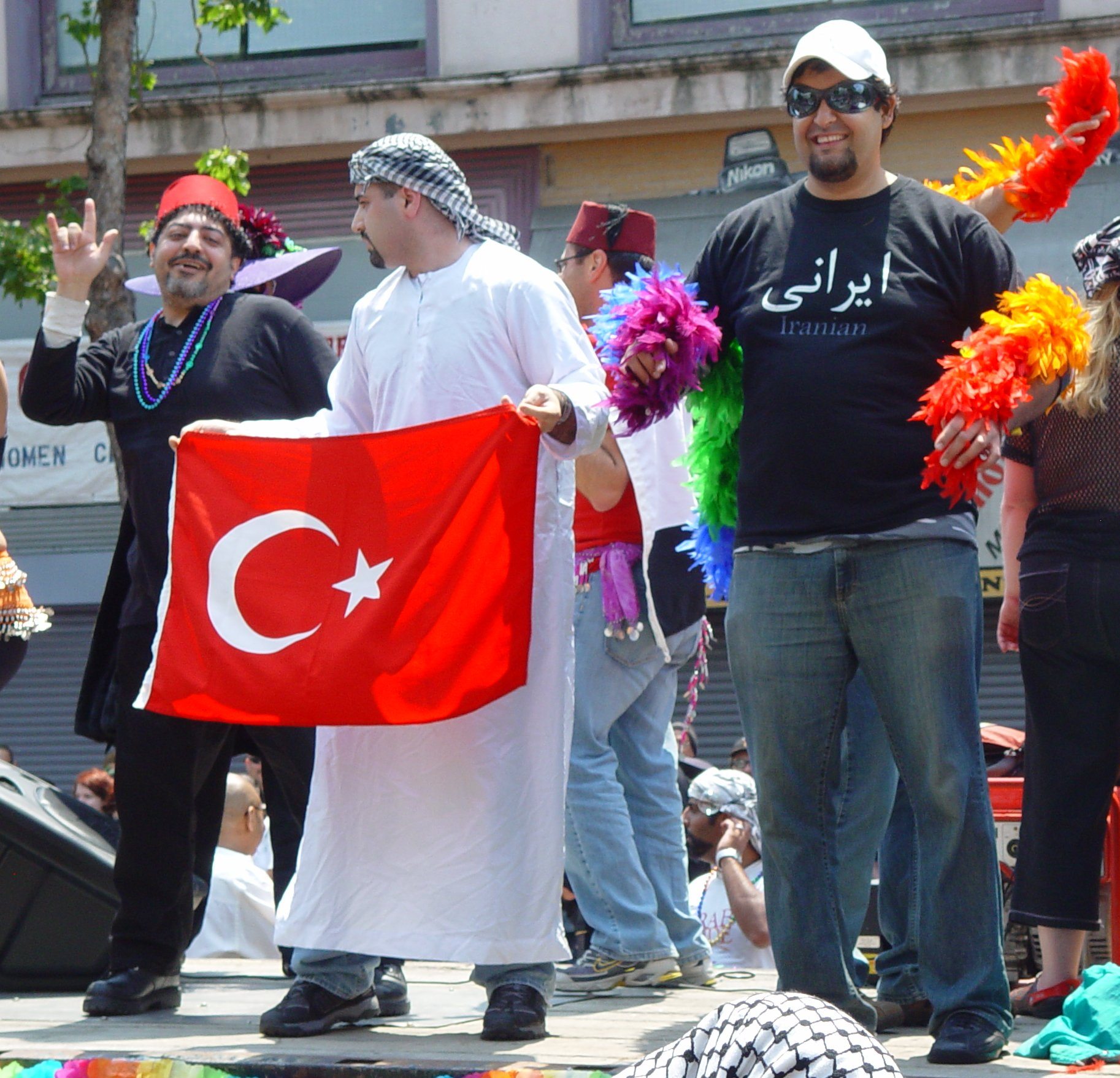
Gay Muslim activists of the Al-Fatiha Foundation holding the flag of Turkey at the San Francisco Pride (2008)

In France there was an Islamic same-sex marriage on 18 February 2012. In Paris in November 2012 a room in a Buddhist prayer hall was used by gay Muslims and called a "gay-friendly mosque", and a French Islamic website is supporting religious same-sex marriage. The Ibn Ruschd-Goethe mosque in Berlin is a liberal mosque open to all types of Muslims, where men and women pray together and LGBTQ worshippers are welcomed and supported. Other significant LGBTQ-inclusive mosques or prayer groups include the El-Tawhid Juma Circle Unity Mosque in Toronto, Masjid an-Nur al-Isslaah (Light of Reform Mosque) in Washington D.C., Masjid Al-Rabia in Chicago, Unity Mosque in Atlanta, People's Mosque in Cape Town South Africa, Masjid Ul-Umam mosque in Cape Town, Qal'bu Maryamin in California, and the Nur Ashki Jerrahi Sufi Community in New York City.

Muslims for Progressive Values, based in the United States and Malaysia, is "a faith-based, grassroots, human rights organization that embodies and advocates for the traditional Qur'anic values of social justice and equality for all, for the 21st Century". MPV has recorded "a lecture series that seeks to dismantle the religious justification for homophobia in Muslim communities". The lectures can be viewed at MPV Lecture Series. The Mecca Institute is an LGBT-inclusive and progressive online Islamic seminary, and serves as an online center of Islamic learning and research.

==== Baháʼí Faith ====
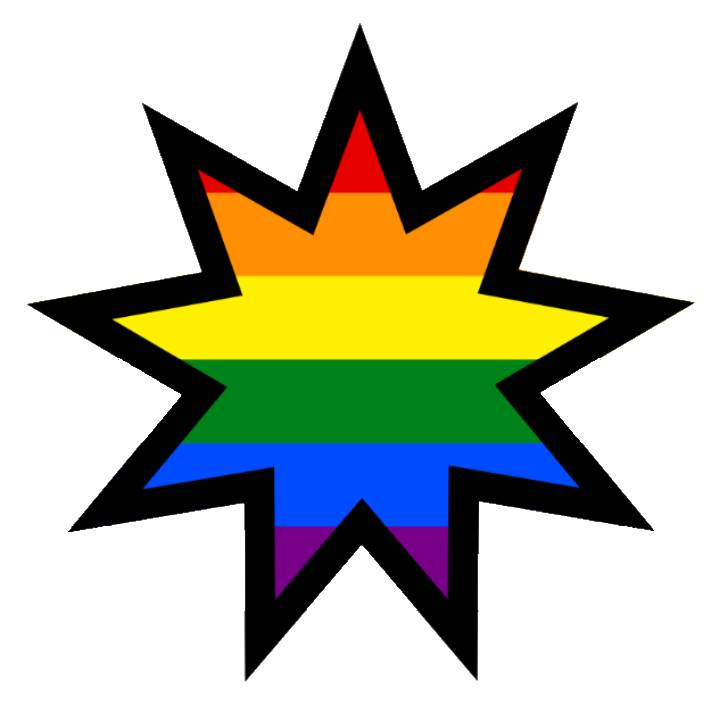
Artist's symbolic depiction of the intersection of the Baháʼí Faith and LGBTQ community combining the Bahai nine-pointed star and LGBTQ rainbow flag

The Baháʼí Faith considers same-sex sexual behavior and same-sex marriage to be against God's will. Sex is only permitted in a marriage between a man and a woman for Baháʼís. Lesbian, gay, and bisexual members who engage in any same-sex sexual behavior are subject to sanctions from the Baha’i administration, including being excluded from community gatherings and denied participation in organizational elections. Baháʼís have been discouraged from both promoting or opposing efforts to legalize same-sex marriage.

The Baháʼí Faith teaches that the only acceptable form of sexual expression is within marriage, and Baháʼí marriage is defined in the religion's texts as exclusively between one man and one woman. Baháʼís stress the importance of absolute chastity for any unmarried person, and focus on personal restraint. The Universal House of Justice, the elected governing body of the Baháʼí Faith, has stated that "the Faith does not recognize homosexuality as a 'natural' or permanent phenomenon". The Universal House of Justice has approved of and encouraged Shoghi Effendi's idea of possible medical treatment. However, membership in the Baháʼí community is open to lesbian and gay adherents, who are to be "advised and sympathized with".

=== Dharmic religions ===
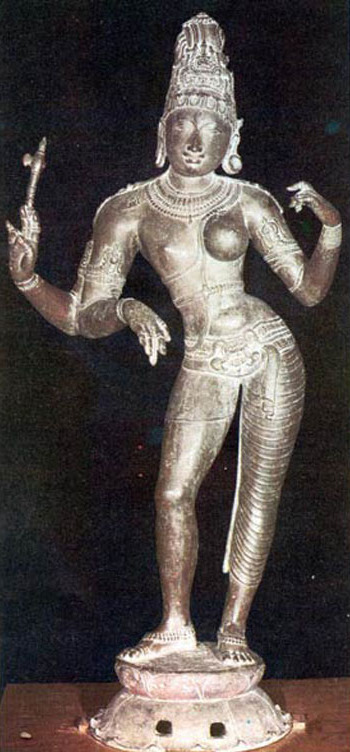
Ardhanarishvara, the androgynous form (half-male and half-female) of the Hindu deity Shiva combined with his consort Parvati. Tiruvenkadu, Chola, 11th century CE.

Among the religions that originated in ancient and medieval India, including Hinduism, Buddhism, Jainism and Sikhism, teachings regarding homosexuality are less clear than among the Abrahamic traditions, and religious authorities voice diverse opinions. Sikhism has no specific teachings about homosexuality and the Sikh holy scripture, the Guru Granth Sahib, does not explicitly mention heterosexuality, homosexuality or bisexuality. The universal goal of a Sikh is to have no hate or animosity to any person, regardless of factors like race, caste, color, creed or gender. Hinduism is diverse, with no supreme governing body, but the majority of swamis opposed same-sex relationships in a 2004 survey, and a minority supported them. Ancient religious texts such as the Vedas do not restrict homosexuality and often refer to people of a third gender, who are neither female nor male. Some see this third gender as an ancient parallel to lesbian, gay, bisexual, transgender and intersex identities.

==== Hinduism ====
Hinduism does not have a central authority. Many Hindu sects have taken various positions on homosexuality, ranging from positive to neutral or antagonistic. Referring to the nature of Samsara, the Rigveda, one of the four canonical sacred texts of Hinduism says 'Vikruti Evam Prakriti' (Perversity/diversity is what nature is all about, or, What seems unnatural is also natural), which some scholars believe recognizes homosexuality as natural, if not an approval of homosexuality. Sexuality is rarely discussed openly in Hindu society, and LGBTQ issues are largely a taboo subject — especially among the strongly religious. A "third gender" has been acknowledged within numerous Hindu texts. Several Hindu texts, such as Manu Smriti and Sushruta Samhita, assert that some people are born with either mixed male and female natures, or sexually neuter, as a matter of natural biology (while at the same time there are examples of speaking negatively in regards to male homosexuality as shown by the Manu Smriti and Arthashastra). They worked as hairdressers, flower-sellers, servants, masseurs and prostitutes. In addition, each Hindu denomination had developed distinct rules regarding sexuality, as Hinduism is not unified and is decentralized in essence. Today, many people that identify as hijras are officially recognized as a third gender that is neither male nor female in India; they mostly live on the margins of society, and many still work in prostitution, or make a livelihood as beggars.

Several Hindu religious laws contain injunctions against homosexual activity, while some Hindu mythologies speaks favorably of lesbian relations and some third-gendered individuals were highly regarded by Hindu legends. Hindu groups are historically not unified regarding the issue of homosexuality, each one having a distinct doctrinal view.

A damsel who pollutes (another) damsel must be fined two hundred (panas), pay the double of her (nuptial) fee, and receive ten (lashes with a) rod.

— Manusmriti, 8.369

The Indian Kama Sutra, written in the 4th century CE, contains passages describing eunuchs or "third-sex" males performing oral sex on men. However, the author was "not a fan of homosexual activities" and treated such individuals with disdain, according to historian Devdutt Pattanaik. The text describes Kama as one of the three objectives to be achieved in life. Though it forbids the educated Brahmins, bureaucrats and wisemen from practicing Auparishtaka (oral sex). Similarly, some medieval Hindu temples and artifacts openly depict both male homosexuality and lesbianism within their carvings, such as the temple walls at Khajuraho. Some infer from these images that Hindu society and religion were previously more open to variations in human sexuality than they are at present.

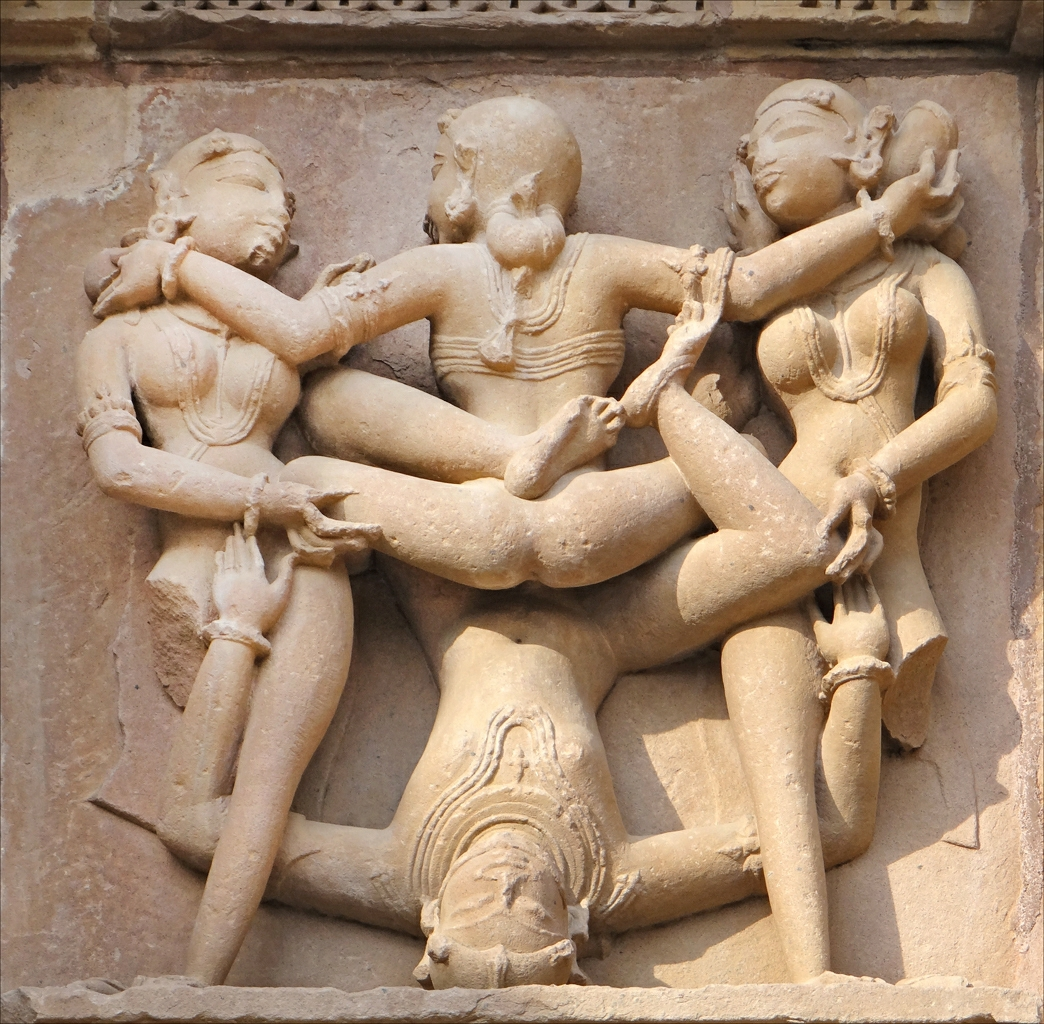
Erotic sculptures from Khajuraho temple complex, India

In some Hindu sects (specially among the hijras), many divinities are androgynous. There are Hindu deities who are intersex (both male and female); who manifest in all three genders; who switch from male to female or from female to male; male deities with female moods and female deities with male moods; deities born from two males or from two females; deities born from a single male or single female; deities who avoid the opposite sex; deities with principal companions of the same sex, and so on. However, this is not accepted by the majority of Hindus, and is often considered heretical in nature. Those who do accept it justify with the belief that both God and nature are unlimitedly diverse and God is difficult to comprehend.

Ayoni sex, which includes oral and anal sex, never came to be viewed as much of a sin like in Christianity nor a serious crime and could be practiced in some cases. Close friendship between people of same genders has also been seen as permissible in Hindu texts.

Several Hindu priests have performed same-sex marriages, arguing that love is the result of attachments from previous births and that marriage, as a union of spirit, is transcendental to gender. It is often regarded that Hinduism does not condemn homosexuality.

==== Buddhism ====
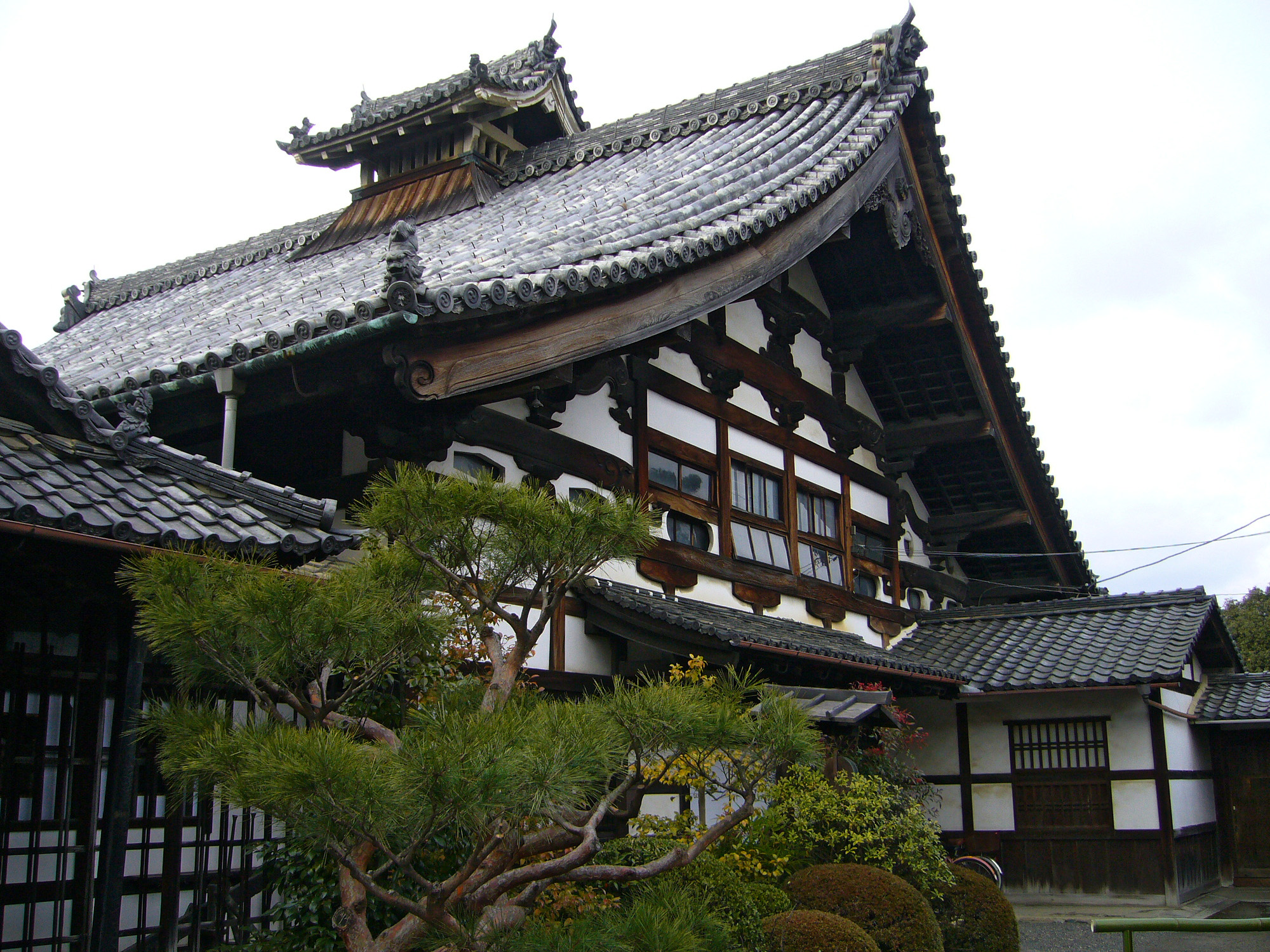
Shunkō-in (Japanese: 春光院: "Temple of the Ray of Spring Light") in Kyoto, Japan, is a Buddhist temple that performs same-sex marriage ceremonies.

The most common formulation of Buddhist ethics are the Five Precepts and the Eightfold Path, one should neither be attached to nor crave sensual pleasure. The third of the Five Precepts is "To refrain from committing sexual misconduct": this precept has sometimes been interpreted to include homosexuality. However, "sexual misconduct" is a broad term, and is subjected to interpretation relative to the social norms of the followers. The determination of whether or not same-gender relations are appropriate for a layperson is not considered a religious matter by many Buddhists.

According to the Pāli Canon and Āgama (the early Buddhist scriptures), there is nothing saying that same or opposite gender relations have anything to do with sexual misconduct, and some Theravādin Buddhist monks express that same-gender relations do not violate the rule to avoid sexual misconduct, which means not having sex with people under age (thus protected by their parents or guardians), someone betrothed or married, and those who have taken vows of religious celibacy.

Artistic representation of the intersection of Buddhism and LGBTQ people shown by the Buddhist flag and rainbow flag

Views on homosexuality and LGBTQ rights differ in the Buddhist tradition. However, many Buddhist leaders and groups have been historically supportive and continue to be supportive of LGBTQ people. The renowned Thiền Buddhist master, Thích Nhất Hạnh, remarked that the spirit of Buddhism is inclusiveness and stated that "when you look at the ocean, you see different kinds of waves, many sizes and shapes, but all the waves have water as their foundation and substance. If you are born gay or lesbian, your ground of being in the same as mine. We are different, but we share the same ground of being."

Japan's culture and major religions don't have a history of hostility towards homosexuality. Same-sex marriages are performed at Shunkō-in, a Rinzai Zen Buddhist temple in Kyoto, Japan. Some modern Buddhist leaders were active in the movement for same-sex marriage rights in Taiwan, which legalized same-sex marriages in 2019. Some adherents of the Navayāna (Ambedkarite) Buddhist tradition are supporting LGBTQ rights within their larger activist activities. In Thailand, some leaders in the Theravāda tradition including Phra Payom Kalayano have expressed support for LGBTQ rights.

The Dalai Lama of the Gelug sect of Tibetan Buddhism previously interpreted sexual misconduct to include lesbian and gay sex, and indeed any sex other than penis-vagina intercourse, including oral sex, anal sex, and masturbation or other sexual activity with the hand; the only time sex is acceptable is when it performed for its purpose of procreation.

In 1997, the 14th Dalai Lama Tenzin Gyatso declared: "From a Buddhist point of view, men-to-men and women-to-women is generally considered sexual misconduct." However, this view expressed by the Dalai Lama is not based on the teachings of Gautama Buddha but derived from some later Abhidharma texts. Moreover, the Dalai Lama has repeatedly "voiced his support for the full recognition of human rights for all people, regardless of sexual orientation". In 2009, when interviewed by Canadian TV news anchor Evan Solomon on CBC News: Sunday about whether or not homosexuality is acceptable in Buddhism, the Dalai Lama responded that "it is sexual misconduct". However, the Dalai Lama supports human rights for all, "regardless of sexual orientation". In the most recent interview with the Dalai Lama on this topic (10 March 2014), the Dalai Lama said gay marriage is "OK", provided it's not in contradiction with the values of one's chosen religion. Also in the Tibetan tradition, the Nalandabodhi sangha has stated that they are welcoming of all sexual orientations and well-known Bhutanese lama Khyentse Norbu has expressed support for LGBTQ rights in Bhutan.

In Western Buddhist denominations, there is widescale support for LGBTQ rights from Buddhist groups and organizations, including the European Buddhist Union, the Buddhist Churches of America, many Shin Buddhist groups, and Zen leaders such as Thích Nhất Hạnh. The Federation of Australian Buddhist Councils (FABC), representing Buddhist laypeople, and the Australian Sangha Association vocally supported same-sex marriage in Australia.

Soka Gakkai International-USA (SGI-USA), the most diverse Buddhist community in the United States, supports LGBTQ rights, and American Soka Gakkai Buddhists have performed same-sex union ceremonies since the 1990s. However, Komeito, the political party that emerged from the Soka Gakkai, has not prioritized LGBT rights when it participated in the government coalition with the LDP. Most of its MPs support same-sex marriage.

In a Pew Research poll, 88% of American Buddhists stated that homosexuality should be accepted. This was a higher level of support than any other religious group studied.

Some later traditions gradually began to add new restrictions on sexual misconduct, like non-vagina sex, though some academics argue it usually involves situations seen as coerced sex. This non-vagina sex as sexual misconduct view is not based on Buddha's teachings, but from later Abhidharma texts.

Buddhism is often characterized as distrustful of sensual enjoyment and sexuality in general. Traditionally, sex and lust are seen as hindering to spiritual progress in most schools of Buddhism; as such monks are expected to refrain from all sexual activity, and the Vinaya (the first book of the Tripitaka) specifically prohibits sexual intercourse, then further explain that anal, oral, and vaginal intercourse amount to sexual intercourse, which will result in permanent exclusion from Sangha. A notable exception in the history of Buddhism occurred in Japan during the Edo period, in which male homosexuality, or more specifically, love between young novices and older monks, were celebrated.

References to pandaka, a eunuch/impotence category that is sometimes interpreted to include homosexual males, can be found throughout the Pali canon as well as other Sanskrit scriptures. In the Chinese version of Sarvastivada Vinaya, the pandaka is mentioned as also trying to have sex with women, not just men. Leonard Zwilling refers extensively to Buddhaghosa's Samantapasadika, where pandaka are described as being filled with defiled passions and insatiable lusts, and are dominated by their libido. Some texts of the Abhidharma state that a pandaka cannot achieve enlightenment in their own lifetime, (but must wait for rebirth) and Asanga and Vasubandhu discussed if a pandaka was able to be enlightened or not. According to one scriptural story, Ananda—Buddha's cousin and disciple—was a pandaka in one of his many previous lives.

Some later classic Buddhist masters and texts disallow contact between monks/Bodhisattva and pandakas/women and classify non-vagina sex as sexual misconduct, including for lay followers.

In Thailand, some accounts propose that "homosexuality arises as a karmic consequence of violating Buddhist proscriptions against heterosexual misconduct. These karmic accounts describe homosexuality as a congenital condition which cannot be altered, at least in a homosexual person's current lifetime, and have been linked with calls for compassion and understanding from the non-homosexual populace." However, Buddhist leaders in Thailand have also condemned homosexuality, ousted monks accused of homosexual acts, and banned kathoey from ordination. In 2009, Senior monk Phra Maha Wudhijaya Vajiramedh introduced a "good manners" curriculum for novices in the monkhood, stating to the BBC that he was concerned by "the flamboyant behaviour of gay and transgender monks, who can often be seen wearing revealingly tight robes, carrying pink purses and having effeminately-shaped eyebrows". However, in Thailand, several leaders in the Theravada tradition including Phra Payom Kalayano have expressed support for LGBT rights.

A later popular Japanese legend attributed the introduction of monastic homosexuality to Japan to Shingon founder Kukai, although scholars now dismiss the veracity of this assertion, pointing out his strict adherence to the Vinaya. Nonetheless, the legend served to "affirm same sex relation between men and boys in seventeenth century Japan". However, Japanese Buddhist scholar and author of "Wild Azaleas" Kitamura Kigin argued that there was a tendency in monasteries to avoid heterosexuality and to encourage homosexuality.

Although Mahayana Buddhism has some texts against homosexuality (from later Abhidharma texts and Buddhist apocrypha), the majority of its teachings assert that all beings who correctly practice the dharma may reach enlightenment, since all possess an innate Buddha nature. Enlightenment being achievable even in a single life. Some Mahayana Buddhist leaders were active in the movement for same-sex marriage rights in Taiwan which legalized same-sex marriages in 2019.

The capacity of Buddhism to reform itself and its great variety of distinct beliefs and schools, provide many liberal streams of Buddhism, which are accepting of all sexual orientations. Reformists of Buddhism are mainly predominant in cosmopolitan cities. In global traditions, there is a widescale support for LGBT rights including the European Buddhist Union, the Buddhist Churches of America, many Shin Buddhist groups, and Zen leaders such as Thich Nhat Hanh. The Federation of Australian Buddhist Councils (FABC), representing Buddhist laypeople, and the Australian Sangha Association vocally supported same-sex marriage in Australia. Soka Gakkai International-USA (SGI-USA) is the most diverse Buddhist community in the United States with more than 500 chapters and some 100 centers throughout the country supports LGBT rights. In a PEW research poll, 88% of American Buddhists stated that homosexuality should be accepted. This was a higher level of support than any other religious group studied.

==== Sikhism ====
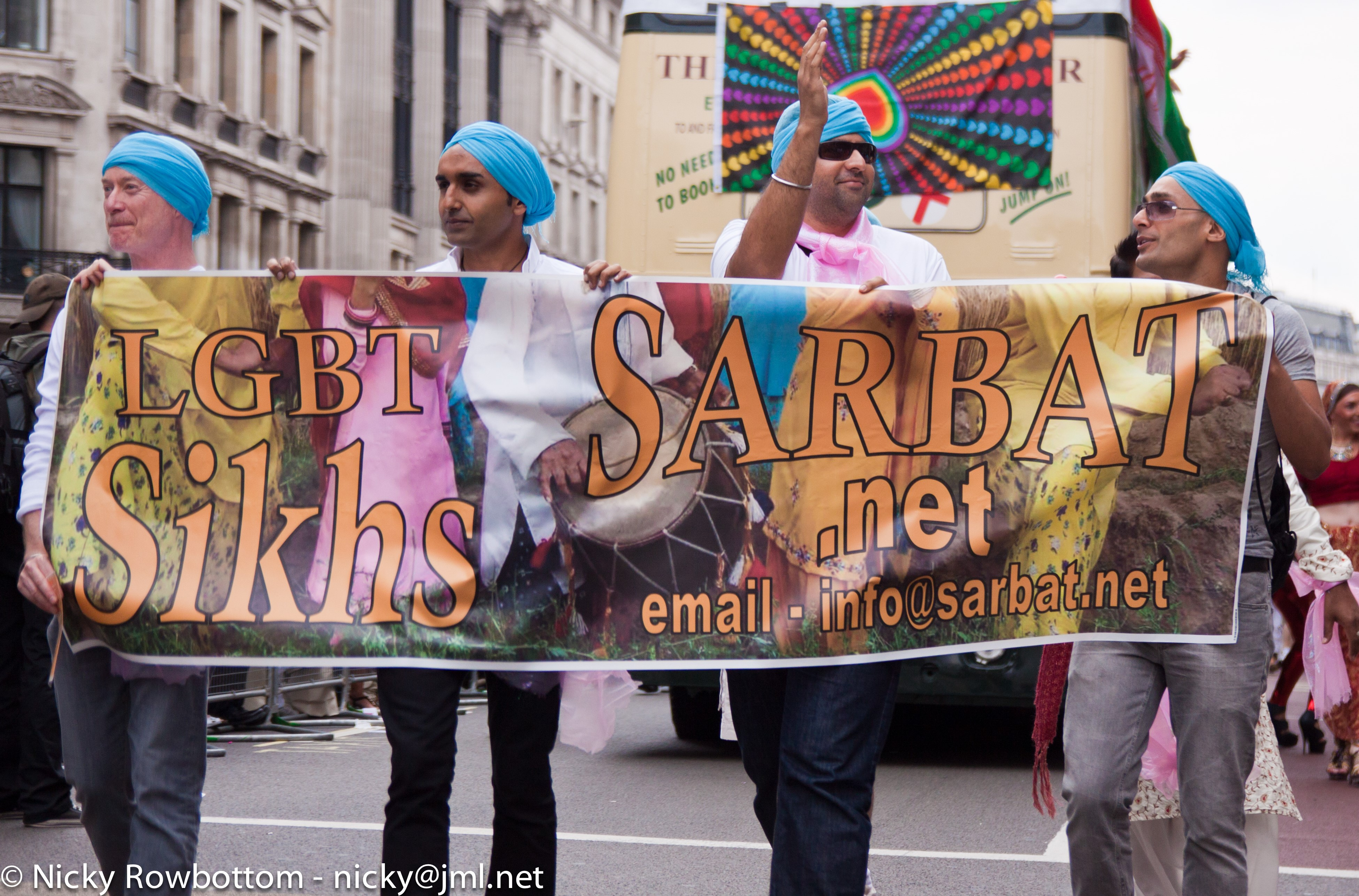
LGBTQ Sikhs demonstrate in London for the acceptance of LGBTQ people in their religion

Sikhism has no specific teachings about homosexuality and the Sikh holy scripture, the Guru Granth Sahib, does not explicitly mention heterosexuality, homosexuality or bisexuality. The Guru Granth Sahib is seen as the spiritual authority on all Sikh matters. In Guru Granth Sahib, marriage is seen as a union of souls. In Sikhism, the soul is seen as genderless, and the outward appearance of human beings (man, woman) is a temporary state. Same-sex marriage advocates refer to this fact. The universal goal of a Sikh is to have no hate or animosity to any person, regardless of factors like race, caste, color, creed or gender.

Akal Takhat, the highest religious authority of the Sikhs, issued an edict (hukamnaama) in 2005 against any homosexual marriage in front of Sikh Scriptures (11th Guru of the Sikhs—Shri Guru Granth Sahib). This was again reiterated when one couple performed an Anand Karaj (Sikh religious marriage) of two homosexual men in 2020 in California. The couple was thrown out of the Sikh religion for this violation.

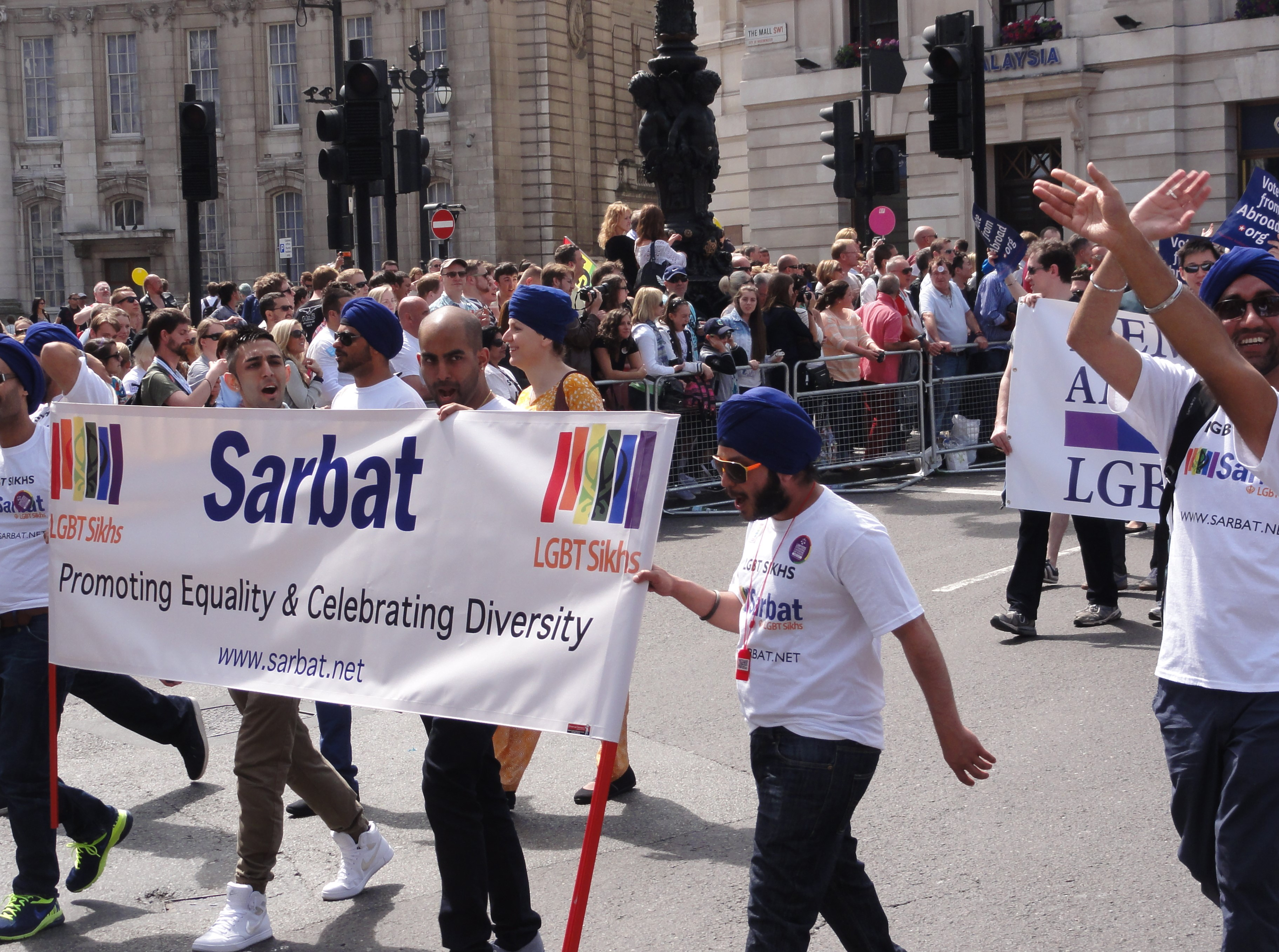
Sikhs march for LGBTQ acceptance at London Pride

Some modern Sikh leaders have condemned homosexuality. Giani Joginder Singh Vedanti of the temporal Sikh authority (Akal Takht), has condemned homosexuality while reminding visiting Sikh-Canadian Members of Parliament (MPs) of their religious duty to oppose same-sex marriage. The Sikh religious body, the Akal Takht, has issued an edict condemning gay marriage.

Other Sikhs point out that Sikhism does not condemn homosexuality or gay marriage reminding them that the Guru Granth Sahib leaves this as a matter of personal conscience.

Gurbani based view:

...... much of Sikh teaching is couched in metaphors from family life. Even the adoration of God is explored in terms of the closest relationship that humans can comprehend—that between a man and a woman. The heterosexual relationship is defined as sacred in Sikhism; an honest family life is described as the first duty—the primary religion of humans.

— Dr I J Singh "Same Sex Unions"

=== Eastern and Southeast Asian religions ===
Among the Taoic religions of East Asia, such as Taoism, passionate homosexual expression is usually discouraged because it is believed to not lead to human fulfillment.

==== Burmese folk religion ====
Many Nat Kadaws in traditional Burmese folk religion are members of the LGBT community.

==== Chinese folk religion ====
Tu'er Shen, also known as the Rabbit God, is a gay Chinese deity. In 2006, Lu Wei-ming founded a temple for Tu'er Shen in Yonghe District in the New Taipei City in Taiwan, which has been called the world's only religious shrine for gay people. About 9,000 pilgrims visit the temple each year praying to find a suitable partner. The Wei-ming temple also performs love ceremonies for gay couples.

==== Confucianism ====
Confucianism, being primarily a social and political philosophy, focused little on sexuality; whether homosexual or heterosexual. However, the ideology did emphasize male friendships, and Louis Crompton has argued that the "closeness of the master-disciple bond it fostered may have subtly facilitated homosexuality". Homosexuality is not mentioned in the Analects of Confucius.

==== Đạo Mẫu ====
In Vietnam, many LGBT people find a safe community within the Đạo Mẫu religion, which is worship of the mother god. Many LGBT people act as mediums during Đạo Mẫu rituals.

==== Shinto ====
Historically, the Shinto "had no special code of morals and seems to have regarded sex as a natural phenomenon to be enjoyed with few inhibitions". While Shinto beliefs are diverse, Shinto doesn't condemn homosexuality, and the formally organized Konkokyo sect is fully affirming. Multiple Shinto leaders advocated in support of gay marriage in Hawaii.

==== Taoism ====
There is no single official position on homosexuality in Taoism, as the term Taoism is used to describe a number of disparate religious traditions encompassing a variety of views. Although Taoist alchemy generally emphasized that ejaculation in heterosexual relationships represented a draining of the male's "life essence", this concept was not generally extended to non-heterosexual sex.

In a similar way to Buddhism, Taoist schools sought throughout history to define what would be sexual misconduct. Broadly speaking, the precept against "sexual misconduct" in Taoism relates to extramarital sex. The term for a married couple (夫婦) usually in Chinese suggests a male with a female, though Taoist scripture itself does not explicitly say anything against same-sex relations. Many sorts of precepts mentioned in the Yunji Qiqian (雲笈七籤), The Mini Daoist Canon, does not explicitly say anything against same-gender relations as well.

Homosexuality is not unknown in Taoist history, such as during the Tang dynasty when Taoist nuns exchanged love poems. As a sexual misconduct however would depend on what sect or school they were from as some traditions considered homosexuality to be misconduct and others did not mention it at all. There are also certain talismans recorded in different traditions that claim to "cure" a person of the "homosexual disease/desire". Attitudes about homosexuality within Taoism often reflect the values and sexual norms of broader Chinese society and what region of China the sect resided in (see Homosexuality in China).

==== Zoroastrianism ====
The man that lies with mankind as man lies with womankind, or as woman lies with mankind, is a man that is a Daeva [demon]; this man is a worshipper of the Daevas, a male paramour of the Daevas

— Vendidad

The Vendidad, one of the later Zoroastrian texts composed in the Artificial Young Avestan language, has not been dated precisely. It is thought that some concepts of law, uncleanliness, dualism, and salvation were shared between the religions, and subsequent interactions between the religions are documented by events such as the release of the Jews from the Babylonian captivity by Zoroastrian Cyrus the Great in 537 BC, and the Biblical account of the Magi visiting the infant Jesus.

The Vendidad generally promotes procreation: "the man who has a wife is far above him who lives in continence; he who keeps a house is far above him who has none; he who has children is far above the childless man; he who has riches is far above him who has none". It details the penance for a worshipper who submits to sodomy under force as "Eight hundred stripes with the Aspahe-astra, eight hundred stripes with the Sraosho-charana." (equal to the penalty for breaking a contract with the value of an ox), and declares that for those participating voluntarily "For that deed there is nothing that can pay, nothing that can atone, nothing that can cleanse from it; it is a trespass for which there is no atonement, for ever and ever". However, those not practicing the Religion of Mazda were pardoned for past actions upon conversion. It has been argued that, in ancient times, those prohibitions against sodomy did not apply to eunuchs.

=== African diasporic religions ===
Homosexuality is religiously acceptable in Haitian Vodou. The lwa or loa (spirits) Erzulie Dantor and Erzulie Freda are often associated with and viewed as protectors of queer people.

Within Candomblé, a syncretic religion primarily found in Brazil, there is widespread (though not universal) support for gay rights, many members are LGBT, and have performed gay marriages. Practitioners of Santería, primarily found in Cuba, generally (though not universally) welcome LGBTQ members and include them in religious or ritual activities. Also a Brazilian syncretic religion, Umbanda houses generally support LGBTQ rights and have performed gay marriages. Homosexuality is religiously acceptable in Haitian Vodou. The lwa or loa (spirits) Erzulie Dantor and Erzulie Freda are often associated with and viewed as protectors of queer people. The lao Ghede Nibo is sometimes depicted as an effeminate drag queen and inspires those he inhabits to lascivious sexuality of all kinds.

==== Candomblé ====
Within Candomblé, a syncretic religion found primarily in Brazil, there is widespread (though not universal) support for gay rights, many members are LGBT, and have performed gay marriages. In Candomblé, homosexuality is usually accepted and explained by the sex of one's orisha. Homosexuality would be more probable in a man with a female orisha, a woman with a male orisha, or any of them with an androgynous orisha (such as Olokun).

==== Haitian Vodou ====
Homosexuality is religiously acceptable in Haitian Vodou. The lwa or loa (spirits) Erzulie Dantor and Erzulie Freda are often associated with and viewed as protectors of queer people. The lao Ghede Nibo is sometimes depicted as an effeminate drag queen and inspires those he inhabits to lascivious sexuality of all kinds.

==== Santería ====
Practitioners of Santería, primarily found in Cuba, generally (though not universally) welcome LGBT members and include them in religious or ritual activities.

==== Umbanda ====
Also a Brazilian syncretic religion, Umbanda houses generally support LGBT rights and have performed gay marriages.

=== New religious movements ===
Since the beginning of the sexual liberation movement in the Western world, which coincided with second-wave feminism and the women's liberation movement initiated in the early 1960s, new religious movements and alternative spiritualities such as Modern Paganism and the New Age began to grow and spread across the globe alongside their intersection with the sexual liberation movement and the counterculture of the 1960s, and exhibited characteristic features, such as the embrace of alternative lifestyles, unconventional dress, rejection of Abrahamic religions and their conservative social mores, use of cannabis and other recreational drugs, relaxed attitude, sarcastic humble or self-imposed poverty, and laissez-faire sexual behavior. The sexual liberation movement was aided by feminist ideologues in their mutual struggle to challenge traditional ideas regarding female sexuality, male sexuality, and queer sexuality. Elimination of undue favorable bias towards men and objectification of women, as well as support for women's right to choose their sexual partners free of outside interference or societal judgment, were three of the main goals associated with sexual liberation from the feminist perspective.

==== Unitarian Universalism ====
Unitarian Universalism and the Unitarian Universalist Association (UUA) have a long-standing tradition of welcoming LGBTQ people. The first ordained minister of any religion in the US or Canada to come out was the Rev. James Stoll in 1969. There have been UUA resolutions supporting people regardless of sexual orientation since 1970, and a popular program of becoming a "Welcoming Congregation" since 1989. The UUA has officially supported UUA clergy performing Services of Union between same-sex couples since 1984, and has supported same-sex marriage since 1996.

The Canadian Unitarian Council (CUC) similarly operates a Gender and Sexual Diversity Monitoring Group and, like the UUA (of which it became autonomous in 2002), has Welcoming Congregations. The Canadian Unitarian Universalist congregations perform same-sex marriages and the CUC supports this work through its Lay Chaplaincy program.

The first ordained minister of a major religious sect in the U.S. or Canada to come out as gay was the UU Minister James Stoll in 1969. There have been denominational resolutions supporting LGBTQ people since 1970, when a resolution was passed that condemned discrimination against homosexuals. Unitarian Universalism was the first denomination to accept openly transgender people as full members with eligibility to become clergy; in 1988 the first openly transgender person was ordained by the Unitarian Universalist Association (UUA).

The UUA has supported marriage equality since 1996 and compared those who resisted such equality to the resistance to the abolition of slavery, women's suffrage, and the end of anti-miscegenation laws. Three-quarters of all UU congregations have undertaken a series of organizational, procedural, and practical steps to become acknowledged as a "Welcoming Congregation": a congregation that is intentionally welcoming and inclusive of LGBTQ members. On June 29, 1984, the UUA became the first major denomination "to approve religious blessings on homosexual unions". Unitarian Universalists were in the forefront of the work to make same-sex marriages legal in their local states and provinces, as well as on the national level. In May 2004, Arlington Street Church, Boston, was the site of the first state-sanctioned same-sex marriage in the United States. LGBTQ people are regularly ordained as ministers, and have also served at the highest levels of leadership in the denomination, including as president of the Canadian Unitarian Council, interim co-president of the Unitarian Universalist Association, and co-moderator of the UUA.

==== Antoinism ====
Antoinism, a new religious movement founded in Belgium in 1910, does not provide any prescription on issues such as sexuality, as it considers that this is not related to spirituality; homosexuality is not deemed a sin and there is nothing wrong to be gay and Antoinist.

==== Eckankar ====
Eckankar, an American new religious movement founded by Paul Twitchell in 1965, says on its website that "where legally recognized, same-sex marriages are performed, in the form of the ECK Wedding Ceremony, by ordained ministers of Eckankar".

==== Neo-Druidism ====
The Order of Bards, Ovates and Druids is a worldwide group dedicated to practicing, teaching, and developing modern Druidry and has more than 25,000 members in 50 countries. The Order is LGBT-affirming within a larger framework of support for civil rights, love of justice, and the love of all existences.

==== Santa Muerte ====
The cult of Santa Muerte is a new religious movement centered on the worship of Santa Muerte, a cult image, female deity, and folk saint which is popularly revered in Mexican Neopaganism and folk Catholicism. A personification of death, she is associated with healing, protection, and safe delivery to the afterlife by her devotees. Santa Muerte is also revered and seen as a saint and protector of the lesbian, gay, bisexual, transgender, and queer (LGBTQ+) communities in Mexico, since LGBTQ+ people are considered and treated as outcasts by the Catholic Church, evangelical churches, and Mexican society at large. Many LGBTQ+ people ask her for protection from violence, hatred, disease, and to help them in their search for love. Her intercession is commonly invoked in same-sex marriage ceremonies performed in Mexico. The Iglesia Católica Tradicional México-Estados Unidos, also known as the Church of Santa Muerte, recognizes gay marriage and performs religious wedding ceremonies for homosexual couples. According to R. Andrew Chesnut, Ph.D. in Latin American history and professor of Religious studies, the cult of Santa Muerte is the single fastest-growing new religious movement in the Americas.

==== Modern Paganism ====
Queer Pagan flag combining a pentagram and LGBTQ flag

Most Neopagan religions have the theme of fertility (both physical and creative/spiritual) as central to their practices, and as such encourage what they view as a healthy sex life, consensual sex between adults, regardless of gender.

Heathenry, a modern Germanic Pagan movement, includes several pro-LGBTQ groups. Some groups legitimize openness toward LGBTQ practitioners by reference to the gender-bending actions of Thor and Odin in Norse mythology. There are, for instance, homosexual and transgender members of The Troth, a prominent U.S. Heathen organisation. Many Heathen groups in Northern Europe perform same-sex marriages, and a group of self-described "Homo-Heathens" marched in the 2008 Stockholm Pride carrying a statue of the Norse god Freyr. Research found a greater proportion of LGBTQ practitioners within Heathenry (21%) than wider society, although noted that the percentage was lower than in other forms of modern Paganism.

Wicca, like other religions, has adherents with a broad spectrum of views, ranging from conservative to liberal. It is a largely nondogmatic religion and has no prohibitions against sexual intercourse outside of marriage or relationships between members of the same sex. The religion's ethics are largely summed up by the Wiccan Rede: "An it harm none, do as thou wilt", which is interpreted by many as allowing and endorsing responsible sexual relationships of all varieties. Specifically in the Wiccan tradition of modern witchcraft, one of the widely accepted pieces of Craft liturgy, the Charge of the Goddess instructs that "...all acts of love and pleasure are [the Goddess'] rituals", giving validity to all forms of sexual activity for Wiccan practitioners.

In the Gardnerian and Alexandrian forms of Wicca, the "Great Rite" is a sex ritual much like the hieros gamos, performed by a priest and priestess who are believed to embody the Wiccan God and Goddess. The Great Rite is almost always performed figuratively using the athame and chalice as symbols of the penis and vagina. The literal form of the ritual is always performed by consenting adults, by a couple who are already lovers and in private. The Great Rite is not seen as an opportunity for casual sex.

Pagan groups tend to be relatively accepting of LGBTQ people, same-sex romance, and gender diversity. This has led to a growth in the number of LGBTQ adherents. Some groups continue to use gender essentialist notion causing conflict around non-cisgender individuals and single-gender groups of Pagan people.

==== Radical Faeries ====
The Radical Faeries are a worldwide queer spiritual movement, founded in 1979 in the United States.

==== Wicca ====
The Wiccan Charge of the Goddess, one of the most famous texts in Neopaganism, states in the words of the Goddess, "all acts of love and pleasure are my rituals". In traditional forms of Wicca, such as Gardnerian and Alexandrian Wicca, magic is often performed between a man and a woman, and the "Great Rite" is a sex ritual performed between a Priest and Priestess representing the God and Goddess; however, this is not generally seen as excluding homosexuals or magic between same-sex couples. While many groups still insist that initiations be conferred from man to woman or woman to man, Wicca has become a very diverse religion with varying views. As there is no central governing body nor a core authoritative text, individual covens and practitioners often establish their own guidelines. Many self-initiates are LGBTQ+ and form queer-centered covens and traditions.

==== Raëlism ====
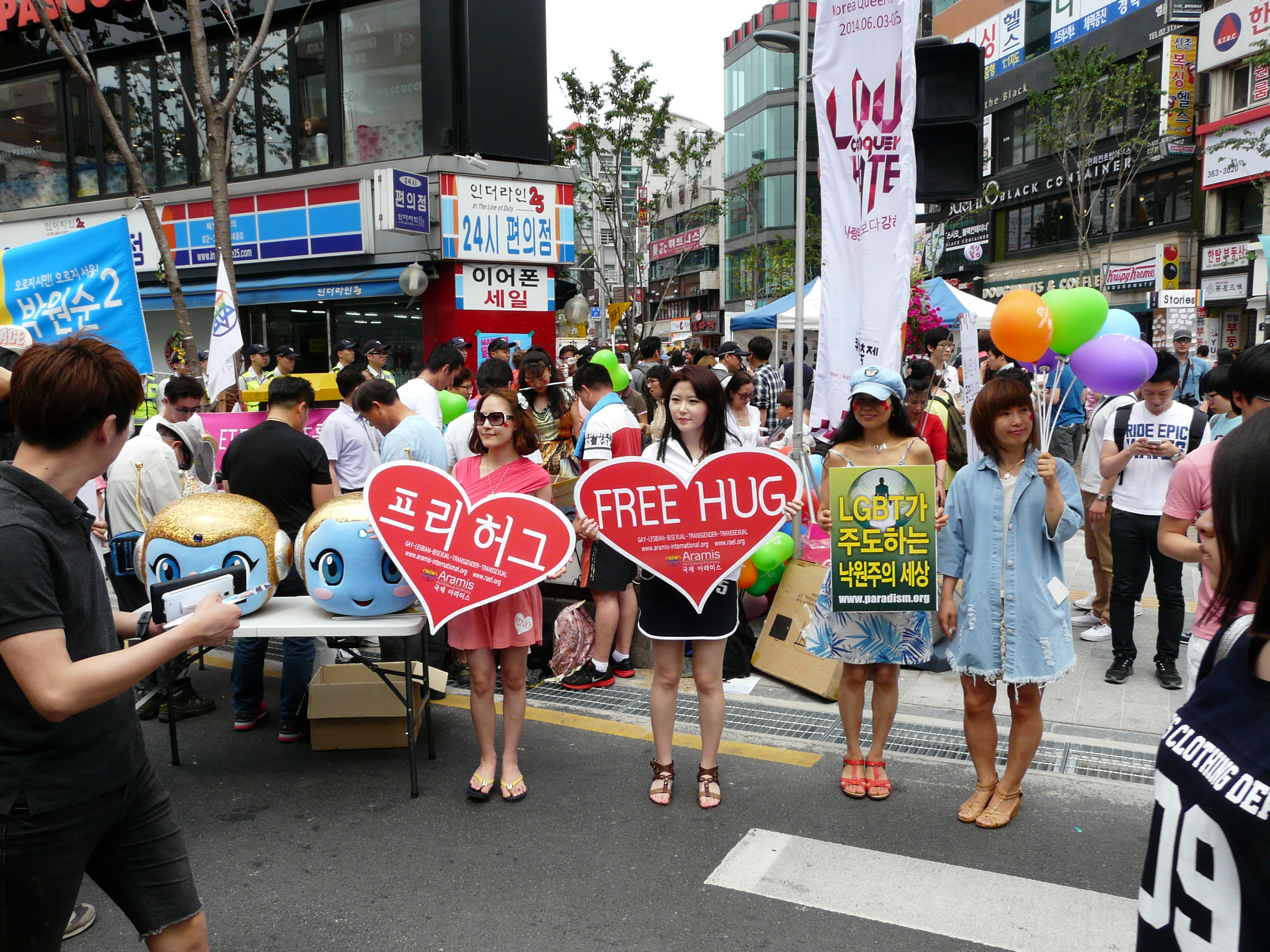
Raëlian participants attending the Korea Queer Culture Festival (2014)

Raëlism, an international new religious movement and UFO religion which was founded in France in 1974, promotes a positive outlook towards human sexuality, including homosexuality. Its founder Raël recognised same-sex marriage, and a Raëlian press release stated that sexual orientation is genetic and it also likened discrimination against gay people to racism. Some Raëlian leaders have performed licensed same-sex marriages.

==== Satanism ====
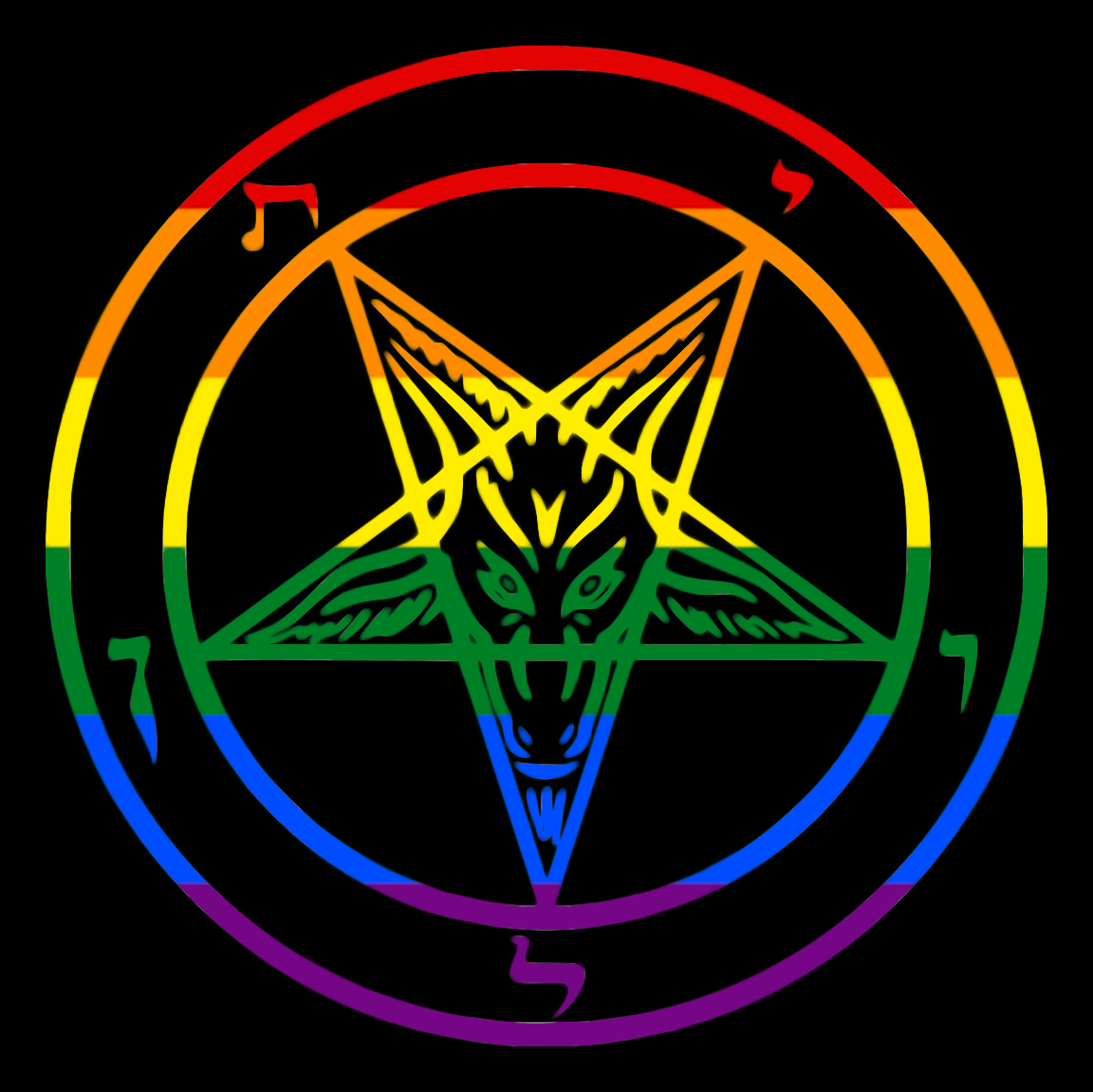
Rainbow version of common Satanic symbol

Both major Satanic traditions, The Satanic Temple and the Church of Satan, emphasise the right of the individual to free sexual expression. Lucien Greaves, spokesperson of The Satanic Temple, has stated the Temple "will always fight ... to the death to ensure that there are equal rights for the gay community".

The Church of Satan has always accepted gays, lesbians and bisexuals since its foundation in 1966. The church supports legalization of same-sex marriages.

Some Theistic Satanists also oppose homophobia. The group Order of Nine Angles released several texts including homosexual versions of sex magic rites. However, the ONA-inspired Black Order, originally founded by Kerry Bolton, split into two separate groups because the new grandmaster, Abaaner Incendium (former editor of Key of Alocer) was openly homosexual and a transvestite who would later undergo gender-affirming surgery. The American section of the order therefore considered the new grandmaster unsuitable and formed the White Order of Thule. In July 1997, two members of the Misanthropic Luciferian Order committed the Keillers Park murder. According to the Svenska Mord website, the exact motives were never elucidated, but Satanism and homophobia may have been relevant factors. According to a later statement from the secretary of the band one of the perpetrators played in, the man had harassed them and was killed out of anger.

==== Scientology ====
The Church of Scientology opposes same-sex marriage and its founder L. Ron Hubbard called homosexuality a dangerous perversion. The Church of Scientology's perspectives on homosexuality are based on the writings of its founder, and his statements about homosexuality have led critics to assert that Scientology promotes homophobia, and being gay or accused of being gay is viewed as negative in the Scientology community. According to a 2018 source, currently used, updated editions of Hubbard's canonical book, Dianetics, continue to use heteronormative and anti-gay language and list gay people as perverts who are physically ill and extremely dangerous to society. Some critics have stated that the church tried to change their gay attractions through forms of therapy.

=== Other religions ===
==== Ancient Mesopotamian religion ====
Individuals who went against the traditional gender binary were heavily involved in the cult of Inanna, an ancient Mesopotamian goddess. During Sumerian times, a set of priests known as gala worked in Inanna's temples, where they performed elegies and lamentations. Men who became gala sometimes adopted female names and their songs were composed in the Sumerian eme-sal dialect, which, in literary texts, is normally reserved for the speech of female characters. Some Sumerian proverbs seem to suggest that gala had a reputation for engaging in anal sex with men. During the Akkadian Period, kurgarrū and assinnu were servants of Ishtar who dressed in female clothing and performed war dances in Ishtar's temples. Several Akkadian proverbs seem to suggest that they may have also had homosexual proclivities. Gwendolyn Leick, an anthropologist known for her writings on Mesopotamia, has compared these individuals to the contemporary Indian hijra. In one Akkadian hymn, Ishtar is described as transforming men into women. Some modern pagans include Inanna in their worship.

==== Pre-colonial religions of the Americas ====
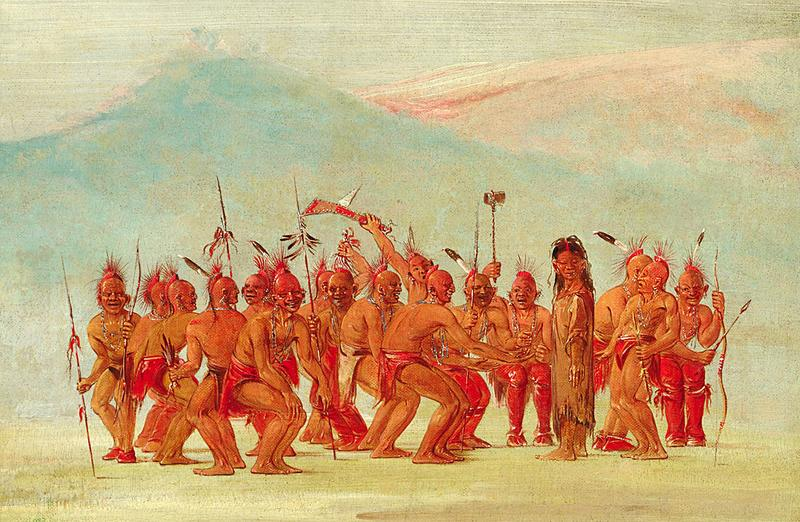
Drawing by George Catlin (1796–1872) while on the Great Plains among the Sac and Fox Nation. Depicting a group of male warriors dancing around a male-bodied person in a woman's dress, non-Native artist George Catlin titled the painting Dance to the Berdache.

Among the Indigenous peoples of the Americas prior to the European colonization, many Nations had respected ceremonial, religious, and social roles for homosexual, bisexual, and gender-nonconforming individuals in their communities and in many contemporary Native American and First Nations communities, these roles still exist. Homosexual and gender-variant individuals were also common among other pre-conquest civilizations in Latin America, such as the Aztecs, Mayans, Quechuas, Moches, Zapotecs, and the Tupinambá of Brazil and were accepted in their various religions. Many Nations had respected ceremonial, religious, and social roles for gender nonconforming Native American and First Nations communities, and these roles still exist.

However, the indigenous peoples of the Americas include hundreds of cultures with varying views on sex, gender, and spirituality. Additionally, First Nations and indigenous views on gender and sexuality may not fall within modern Western categorizations of sex and gender.

==== Pre-colonial religions of the Philippines ====
Filipino shamans, often known as babaylan held positions of authority as religious leaders or healers in some precolonial Philippine societies. Cross-dressing or gender nonconforming males sometimes took on the role of the female babaylan. Early historical accounts record the existence of male babaylans who wore female clothes and took the demeanor of a woman. Anatomy was not the only basis for gender. Being male or female was based primarily on occupation, appearance, actions and sexuality. A male babaylan could partake in romantic and sexual relations with other men without being judged by society. A small number of Filipinos practice local indigenous religions today.

==== Humanism ====
Humanism is a non-religious, non-theistic approach to life that supports full equality for LGBTQ individuals, including the right to marry. Humanism and Its Aspirations, a statement of humanist principles from the American Humanist Association, states that "humanists are concerned for the well being of all, are committed to diversity, and respect those of differing yet humane views ... work to uphold the equal enjoyment of human rights and civil liberties in an open, secular society and maintain it is a civic duty to participate in the democratic process and a planetary duty to protect nature's integrity, diversity, and beauty in a secure, sustainable manner". The American Humanist Association provides an LGBT Humanist Pride award and has funded an LGBT-inclusive prom for Itawamba County Agricultural High School in Mississippi. The organisation LGBT Humanists UK "is a United Kingdom-based not-for-profit that campaigns for lesbian, gay, bisexual and transgender (LGBT) equality and human rights and promotes Humanism as an ethical worldview". It was formerly an independent group, but since 2012 has been a part of the charity Humanists UK. In 2009 they gave Stephen Fry an award "for his services to humanism and gay rights".

Humanists UK Chief Executive Andrew Copson, who is gay, once wrote that "humanists have always been champions of LGBT rights" and cited his organisation's many years campaigning for decriminalisation and LGBT equality in the UK, including legal same-sex marriages. He pointed out the large number of LGBT people in the movement, including Stephen Fry, Christian Jessen, and Peter Tatchell, as well as historical associations with humanism like the writer Virginia Woolf and E. M. Forster. In a statement following the Orlando nightclub shooting for the International Humanist and Ethical Union, of which Copson is also President, he went further, saying "Humanism is the ultimate, long-standing and unfaltering ally of LGBTI people everywhere".

== See also ==
- History of human sexuality
- LGBTQ history
- Culture war
- Societal attitudes toward homosexuality
  - LGBTQ rights by country or territory
  - List of LGBTQ-related organizations and conferences
  - Outline of transgender topics
  - Timeline of LGBTQ history
- Religion and sexuality
  - LGBTQ-affirming religious groups
  - Side B Christian
  - Side A, Side B, Side X, Side Y (theological views)
  - LGBTQ themes in mythology
  - Religious trauma syndrome
  - Religious views on same-sex marriage
  - Transgender people and religion
  - The Bible and homosexuality
- Same-sex marriage
  - History of same-sex unions
  - Legal status of same-sex marriage
  - Timeline of same-sex marriage
- Societal attitudes toward homosexuality
- Third gender
- Two-spirit

== Sources ==
- Birdal, Mehmet Sinan (2020). "The State of Being LGBT in the Age of Reaction: Post-2011 Visibility and Repression in the Middle East and North Africa". In Bosia, Michael J.; McEvoy, Sandra M.; Rahman, Momin (eds.). The Oxford Handbook of Global LGBT and Sexual Diversity Politics. Oxford and New York: Oxford University Press. doi:10.1093/oxfordhb/9780190673741.013.16. ISBN 9780190673741.
- John Boswell (1980). Christianity, Social Tolerance and Homosexuality: Gay People in Western Europe from the Beginning of the Christian Era to the Fourteenth Century (1st ed.). University of Chicago Press. ISBN 0-226-06710-6.
- Claussen, Dane S., ed. (16 October 2002). Sex, Religion, Media. Rowman & Littlefield. ISBN 0-7425-1558-3.
- Etengoff, Chana (28 January 2017). "Petitioning for Social Change: Letters to Religious Leaders From Gay Men and Their Family Allies". Journal of Homosexuality. 64 (2): 166–194. doi:10.1080/00918369.2016.1174022. PMID 27046269. S2CID 40419307.
- Etengoff, Chana; Daiute, Colette (February 2014). "Family members' uses of religion in post–coming-out conflicts with their gay relative". Psychology of Religion and Spirituality. 6 (1): 33–43. doi:10.1037/a0035198.
- Etengoff, Chana; Daiute, Colette (2015). "Clinicians' perspectives of religious families' and gay men's negotiation of sexual orientation disclosure and prejudice". Journal of Homosexuality. 62 (3): 394–426. doi:10.4135/9781483371283.n333.
- Kuefler, Mathew, ed. (November 2005). The Boswell Thesis: Essays on Christianity, Social Tolerance, and Homosexuality. University of Chicago Press. ISBN 0-226-45741-9.
- Luther, Rosie (2023). "What Happens to Those Who Exit Jehovah's Witnesses: An Investigation of the Impact of Shunning". Pastoral Psychology. 72 (1): 105–120. doi:10.1007/s11089-022-01051-x. PMC 9803876. PMID 36618854.
- Eckhart Tolle (1999). The Power of Now: A Guide to Spiritual Enlightenment (1st ed.). New World Library. ISBN 9781577311522.
- Rahman, Momin (2020). "Queer Muslim Challenges to the Internationalization of LGBT Rights: Decolonizing International Relations Methodology through Intersectionality". In Bosia, Michael J.; McEvoy, Sandra M.; Rahman, Momin (eds.). The Oxford Handbook of Global LGBT and Sexual Diversity Politics. Oxford and New York: Oxford University Press. doi:10.1093/oxfordhb/9780190673741.013.27. ISBN 9780190673741.
- Arlene Swidler: Homosexuality and World Religions. Valley Forge 1993. ISBN 1-56338-051-X
- Stephen O. Murray and Will Roscoe (eds.), "Islamic Homosexualities: culture, history, and literature" NYU Press New York 1997
- Vanita, Ruth; Kidwai, Saleem, eds. (2001). Same-sex love in India: readings from literature and history. Palgrave Macmillan. ISBN 978-0-312-29324-6.
- Ransom, Heather J.; Monk, Rebecca L.; Qureshi, Adam; Heim, Derek (February 2021). "Life after Social Death: Leaving the Jehovah's Witnesses, Identity Transition and Recovery". Pastoral Psychology. 70 (1): 53–69. doi:10.1007/s11089-020-00935-0. S2CID 254889060.
- "Views about homosexuality among Jehovah's Witnesses". Pew Research Center. 13 June 2022. Archived from the original on 27 January 2024.
- Wafer, Jim (1991) "The Taste of Blood: Spirit Possession in Brazilian Candomblé" UPP Philadelphia
- Wafer, Jim (1997) "Muhammad and Male Homosexuality" in "Islamic Homosexualities: culture, history, and literature" by Stephen O. Murray and Will Roscoe (eds.), NYU Press New York
- Wafer, Jim (1997) "The Symbolism of Male Love in Islamic Mysthical Literature" in "Islamic Homosexualities: culture, history, and literature" by Stephen O. Murray and Will Roscoe (eds.), NYU Press New York 1997
