= Pandaka =

Sanskrit and Pali term

Paṇḍaka is a Sanskrit and Pali sexuality term which does not have precise English translation, but incorporates (or perhaps confuses) multiple concepts associated with immaturity, voyeurism, impotence and infertility. It has been studied under the auspices of Theravada Buddhist thought.

== Historic context ==
In the Vinaya Pali Canon, 4 gender types are defined: male, female, ubhatobyañjanaka and pandaka. ubhatobyañjanaka refers to intersex or literally a person with the signs of both binary sexes/genders. Paṇḍaka is a less clear cut case, all references have a central theme: some form of deficiency in male sexual reproductive capacity or reproductive desire. In traditional Hindu pre-scientific thought, all reproductive capacity (or burden) has been assigned to the sperm and lingam with no credit to the female or egg.

The Pali literature makes reference to five types of pandaka:

- asittakapandaka - A man who gains satisfaction from performing oral sex on another man and from ingesting his semen, and only becomes sexually aroused after ingesting another man's semen.
- ussuyapandaka - A voyeur, a man who gains sexual satisfaction from watching a man and a woman having sex, and only becomes sexually aroused after that.
- opakkamikapandaka - A Eunuch by-assault, testicle that are annihilated by assault or violence.（"still could attain ejaculation through some special effort or artifice".）
- pakkhapandaka - People who become sexually aroused in parallel with the phases of the moon.
- napumsakapandaka - A person with no clearly defined genitals, whether male or female, having only a urinary tract, one who is congenitally impotent.

== Modern context ==
In the crackdowns on crime in post-coup Thailand, there is draft legislation to clean out crime and sociopaths from the Sangha, and in this drive, a motion to criminalize sexual deviant behaviours within it, yet the very definitions of sexual deviancy or paraphilia are being challenged and revisited by scholars.

== See also ==
- Kathoey
- Religion and homosexuality
- Sodomy
- Fellatio
- Voyeurism
- Sadomasochism
- Clinical lycanthropy
- Genitourinary disorders
