= James Stoll =

American minister and activist (1936–1994)

James Lewis Stoll (January 18, 1936 – December 8, 1994) was a Unitarian Universalist minister who became the first ordained minister of an established denomination in the United States or Canada to come out as gay. He did so at the annual Continental Conference of Student Religious Liberals on September 5, 1969, at the La Foret Conference Center near Colorado Springs, Colorado.

He led the effort that convinced the Unitarian Universalist Association to pass the first-ever gay rights resolution in 1970. He founded the first counseling center for gays and lesbians in San Francisco. In the 1970s, he established the first hospice on Maui. He was president of the San Francisco chapter of the American Civil Liberties Union in 1990s. He died at the age of 58 from complications of heart and lung disease, exacerbated by obesity and a lifelong smoking habit.

== See also ==
- Homosexuality and Unitarian Universalism
- Troy Perry
