= History of the Catholic Church and homosexuality =

The Christian tradition has generally proscribed any and all noncoital genital activities, whether engaged in by couples or individuals, regardless of whether they were of the same or different sex. The position of the Roman Catholic Church with regards to homosexuality developed from the writings of Paul the Apostle and the teachings of the Church Fathers. These were in stark contrast to contemporary Greek and Roman attitudes towards same-sex relations which were more relaxed.

Canon law regulating homosexual activity has mainly been shaped through the decrees issued by a number of synods, starting from the 4th century Council of Elvira. Initially, proscriptions against "sodomy" were aimed simply at ensuring clerical or monastic discipline; and were only later widened in the Middle Ages to include laymen. By the Middle Ages, the Catholic clergy increasingly encouraged the pious to hunt out those committing homosexual acts, and to hand them over to secular authorities for punishment. The Spanish Inquisition tried nearly a thousand individuals for sodomy, where near 500 cases were of sodomy between persons, with only a few cases where the couple were consenting homosexual adults. The relationship between the Catholic church and the modern day LGBT community has been difficult, especially during the height of the AIDS crisis.

== Early Church ==
=== Influence of the Church Fathers ===
The Catholic Church's position on homosexuality developed in substance from the teachings and Scriptural interpretations of the Church Fathers. This was in stark contrast to Greek and Roman practice of pederasty, the "(usually erotic) homosexual relationship between an adult male and a pubescent or adolescent male".

The early 2nd century treatise the Didache (which influenced thinking by early theologians) includes in a list of commandments: "You shall not corrupt boys." (Note: The literal Greek phrase is "ou paidophthorēseis", which means,"You shall not corrupt boys.) David F. Greenberg cites it as an example of early Christian writings that were "unequivocably opposed to male prostitution and pederasty—probably the most visible forms of homosexuality in their time".

Clement of Alexandria (c. 150–c. 215) rebuked heathens for worshipping gods who indulged in debauching of boys. Eusebius of Caesarea (c. 260/265–339/340) wrote of God "having forbidden all unlawful marriage, and all unseemly practice, and the union of women with women and men with men".

The Apology of Aristides of Athens, presented to Emperor Hadrian around 117–138 CE (himself homosexual), scorned the practices and acts of the Greek pagans who worshiped gods some of whom "polluted themselves by lying with males". (Note: Robert Grant in The Anchor Bible Dictionary argues that the language in the Syriac version against homosexuality is stronger, probably because it was presented to Antoninus Pius rather than the homosexual Hadrian.)

Basil of Caesarea (c.329 or 330–379) was among the first to talk about penalties, advising in a letter that "He who is guilty of unseemliness with males will be under discipline for the same time as adulterers." Taking Basil's lead, Gregory of Nyssa's Canonical Letter to Letoius of Mytilene (Epist. canonica 4, 390 CE) also prescribes the same period of penance for adultery and for "craving for the male".

John Chrysostom (c. 347–407), the Archbishop of Constantinople, was particularly vocal on the subject—loathing homosexuality. His most notable discourse in this regard is his fourth homily on Romans 1:26–27, where he argued that those who have sex with the same gender must do so because they are insane: "All of these affections then were vile, but chiefly the mad lust after males; for the soul is more the sufferer in sins, and more dishonored than the body in diseases. ...[The men] have done an insult to nature itself. And a yet more disgraceful thing than these is it, when even the women seek after these intercourses, who ought to have more shame than men." He went on to describe homosexuality as a worse sin than murder. Punishment will be found in hell for such transgressors. He noted that women could also be guilty of the sin as much as men (although the former additionally disrupted the patriarchal hierarchy through such as act). Chrysostom believed that the male passive partner had effectively renounced his manhood and become a woman; such an individual deserved to be killed, "driven out and stoned". Chrysostom was particularly influential in shaping early Christian thought that same-sex desire was an evil that ultimately resulted in social injustice, altering the traditional interpretation of Sodom as a place of inhospitality, to one where the sexual transgressions of the Sodomites became paramount [note: this claim is highly contested. Second Temple Jewish literature is replete with references to the sexual sins of Sodom and Gomorrah (see "Testament of Levi" 14:6, "Testament of Naphtali" 3:4, 5; 4.1, "Testament of Benjamin" 9.1, "Jubilees" 16:15-16, Philo's "Quaestiones Et Solutiones in Genesin," 4:37, 38; "De Abraham" 26:134-6; see also "2Enoch" (Slavonic) 10:4, 34:0, 34:2), as is earlier Christian literature].

=== Early Church Councils ===
Canon law regulating same-sex sexual activity has mainly been shaped through the decrees issued by a number of ecclesiastical councils. Initially, canons against sodomy were aimed at ensuring clerical or monastic discipline, and were only widened in the medieval period to include laymen.

The early 4th-century Council of Elvira (305–306) was the first church council to deal with the issue directly, excluding from Holy Communion anyone who had sexual intercourse (stuprum) with a boy:

Canons 16 and 17 of the Council of Ancyra (314 CE), which "became the standard source for medieval ecclesiastical literature against homosexuality", imposed on "those who have been or who are guilty of bestial lusts" penances whose severity varies with the age and married status of the offender, allowing access to communion only at death for a married man over fifty years old (canon 16); and imposed a penance also on "defilers of themselves with beasts, being also leprous, who have infected others [with the leprosy of this crime]".

There are examples of punishments. In the sixth century, the Greek chronicler John Malalas recorded that a certain Isaiah (the Bishop of Rhodes) and Alexander (Bishop of Diopolis) had been punished by the Prefect of Thrace for "homosexual practices". Isaiah was tortured severely and exiled, while Alexander had his genitals amputated and paraded around the city on a litter to humiliate him. As a result, the Christian Emperor Justinian (482–565 CE) decreed that all caught for pederasty should have their genitals amputated. Many gay men were arrested in the wake of this, and died from their injuries. An atmosphere of fear followed.

In Iberia, the Visigothic ruler Egica of Hispania and Septimania demanded that a church council confront the occurrence of homosexuality in the kingdom. In 693, the Sixteenth Council of Toledo issued a canon condemning guilty clergy to degradation and exile and laymen to a hundred lashes. Egica added an edict imposing the punishment of castration.

The matter was also dealt with at the Council of Paris (829) in canons 34 and 69. These went beyond Elvira and Ancyra in explicitly endorsing the death penalty for sodomy—claiming that it had led God to destroy Sodom and Gomorrah and send the Great Flood. (Note: (However, the historian John Boswell has called the canons a forgery in John Boswell, Christianity, Social Tolerance, and Homosexuality (University of Chicago Press 2009 ISBN 978-0-22606714-8), P. 177 arguing in fact that "attitudes towards homosexuality grew steadily more tolerant in the early Middle Ages").) The concern at Paris was that toleration of sodomy might provoke God to give victory to the enemies of Christianity (with particular concerns about the growth of Islam at this time). At about the same time, the set of (forged) capitularies produced by the deacon Benedict Levita implied that Charlemagne had likewise supported the death penalty. Finally, canon 15 of the Council of Trolsy (909 CE) warned against "pollution with men or animals".

Alongside this, penances for such sexual transgressions may increasingly be found in a few of the penitential books which first emerged in the 6th century in monastic communities in Ireland (including for women having sex with other women).

== Medieval and Early Modern period ==
By the late Middle Ages, the term "sodomy" had come to cover copulation between males, bestiality, non-vaginal heterosexual intercourse, coitus interruptus, masturbation, fellatio and anal sex (whether heterosexual or homosexual); and it increasingly began to be identified as the most heinous of sins by authorities of the Catholic Church. In Italy, Dominican friars would encourage the pious to "hunt out" sodomites and hand them to the Inquisition to be dealt with accordingly: "These clerical discourses provided a language for secular authorities to condemn sodomy, ...By persecuting sodomites as well as heretics, the Church strengthened its authority and credibility as a moral arbiter."

Pope Leo IX labeled homosexuality in the 11th century as "filthy," an "execrable vice," and "obscene." Likewise around 1051, Peter Damian penned the Liber Gomorrhianus in which he argued for stricter ecclesiastical punishment for clerics guilty of "sins against nature."

Klaits writes: "From the twelfth century on, outsiders came under increasing verbal and physical attack from churchmen, allied secular authorities, and, particularly in the case of Jews, from the lower strata of the population"; and Jews, heretics, homosexuals, and magicians were among the most significant "outsiders."

The Council of London in 1102, called at the urging of English Archbishop Anselm of Canterbury, explicitly denounced homosexual behavior as a sin for the first time at an English council. Anselm felt that sodomy was widespread and not condemned strongly enough or regarded with the seriousness that it should have. Confessors were urged to take account of such ignorance when hearing confessions, but take into account mitigating factors such as age and marital status before prescribing penance; and counselling was generally preferred to punishment. In Canons 28 and 29 the Council decreed that the people should be informed of the gravity of the sin and their obligation to confess (particularly if they derived pleasure from it). Nevertheless, Anselm deferred publication of the proceedings, arguing that further time was needed to clarify certain matters. Boswell argues the decrees were never published at all.

In 1179, Pope Alexander III presided over the Third Lateran Council in Rome which decreed (canon 11) that all those guilty of sodomy be removed from office or confined to penitential life in a monastery, if clergy; and be strictly excommunicated, if laity: "Let all who are found guilty of that unnatural vice for which the wrath of God came down upon the sons of disobedience and destroyed the five cities with fire, if they are clerics be expelled from the clergy or confined in monasteries to do penance; if they are laymen they are to incur excommunication and be completely separated from the society of the faithful." The French theologian Alain de Lille complained in 1202 that "such a great body of foul men roam and riot along the breadth of the whole earth," spreading perversion and impurity with "monstrous acts" endangering the wider community.

At the same time, the German Abbess Hildegard of Bingen in her Liber divinorum operum described homosexuality as the "supreme offence against God." In her book Scivias, she describes a vision of God, and quotes him condemning homosexual acts, saying "a man who sins with another man as if with a woman sins bitterly against God" and therefore is "guilty of death."

Canon 14 of the Fourth Lateran Council in 1215 stated that if a priest suspended for unchastity of any kind—especially the vice that "on account of which the anger of God came from heaven upon the children of unbelief" (sodomy)—dared to celebrate Mass then he was to be deposed permanently from the priesthood. (Note: "That the morals and general conduct of clerics may be better let all strive to live chastely and virtuously, particularly those in sacred orders, guarding against every vice of desire, especially, so that in the sight of Almighty God they may perform their duties with a pure heart and chaste body. But lest the facility to obtain pardon be an incentive to do wrong, we decree that whoever shall be found to indulge in the vice of incontinence, shall, in proportion to the gravity of his sin, be punished in accordance with the canonical statutes, which we command to be strictly and rigorously observed, so that he whom divine fear does not restrain from evil, may at least be withheld from sin by a temporal penalty. If therefore anyone suspended for this reason shall presume to celebrate the divine mysteries, let him not only be deprived of his ecclesiastical benefices but for this twofold offense let him be forever deposed.")

By the early 13th century (time of the Fourth Lateran Council) the Church determined that "secular authorities, as well as clergy, should be allowed to impose penalties on 'sodomites' for having had sexual relations," and by the end of this period, "Sodomites were now [regarded as] demons as well as sinners." Civil authorities were in parallel trying the crime of sodomy in their own courts, although in practice applying even more severe punishments. Roman civil law, for example, had prescribed death by burning for those found guilty of sodomy.

Around 1230, Pope Gregory IX argued that sodomites were "abominable persons despised by the world, ... more unclean than animals."

=== Thomas Aquinas ===
In the Summa Theologica, Thomas Aquinas stated that "the unnatural vice" is the greatest of the sins of lust. In his Summa contra Gentiles, traditionally dated to 1264, he argued against what he called "the error of those who say that there is no more sin in the emission of the semen than in the ejection of other superfluous products from the body" by saying that, after murder, which destroys an existing human being, disordinate emission of semen to the preclusion of generating a human being seems to come second.

Alongside this, the German Dominican Albertus Magnus described homosexuality as a foulness that was marked by an uncontrollable frenzy as well as contagious.

In 1424, Bernardino of Siena preached for three days in Florence, Italy, against homosexuality and other forms of lust, calling for sodomites to be ostracized, and these sermons alongside measures by other clergy of the time strengthened opinion against homosexuals and encouraged the authorities to increase the measures of persecution.

=== The Inquisition and homosexuality ===
In 1451, Pope Nicholas V enabled the Inquisition to prosecute men who practiced sodomy. Handed over to the civil authorities, those condemned were frequently burned in accordance with civil law.

In 1478, with the Papal Bull Exigit Sinceras Devotionis Affectus, Pope Sixtus IV acceded to the request of Ferdinand II of Aragon and Isabella I of Castile, granting them exclusive authority to name the inquisitors in their kingdoms. The Spanish Inquisition thus replaced the Medieval Inquisition which had been set up under direct papal control, and transferred it in Spain to civil control. In 1482, in response to complaints by relatives of the first victims, Sixtus wrote that he had not intended his grant to be abused in that way. However, strong pressure brought to bear on him prevented him from revoking it.

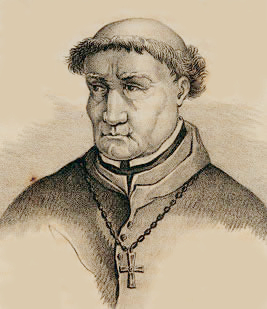
Tomas de Torquemada was a prominent leader of the Spanish Inquisition. 150 sodomites were executed by burning in Spain from 1570 to 1630.

The Tribunal of the Holy Office of the Inquisition in Spain, as the Spanish Inquisition was formally known, was therefore under the control of its monarchs. The Dominicans became formidable through their control of that Inquisition under the direction of the friar Tomas de Torquemada. At first it seems to have been reluctant to take on responsibility for trying those accused of sodomy, and the Suprema (the governing body) ruled in 1509 that such cases were for the secular courts (which already punished sodomy with death). However, in 1524 the Suprema requested papal authorisation to also prosecute sodomites. Pope Clement VII granted permission but only within the Kingdom of Aragon and on condition that trials be conducted according to the civil laws, not the standard inquisitorial procedure. The Pope refused the request of King Philip II of Spain to extend the authority of the Spanish Inquisition to conducting such trials in the rest of Spain.

Within Aragon and its dependent territories, the number of individuals that the Spanish Inquisition tried for sodomy, between 1570 and 1630 was over 800 or nearly a thousand. The reports of several hundred sodomy cases indicates that most concerned the relationships between an older man and an adolescent, often involving prostitution. According to Monter, an estimated 100 of the total cases involved clear child abuse. In Spain, those whom the Spanish Inquisition convicted and had executed "by burning without the benefit of strangulation" were about 150. The Inquisition was harsh to sodomizers (more so for those committing bestiality than homosexuality), but tended to restrict death by burning only to those aged over twenty-five. Minors were normally whipped and sent to the galleys. Mildness was also shown to clergy, who were always a high proportion of those arrested. In fact, conviction and execution for sodomy was easier to obtain from the civil courts in other parts of Spain than from the tribunals of the Inquisition in Aragon, and there executions for sodomy were much more numerous. After 1633, where the Spanish Inquisition had jurisdiction for sodomy, it ceased treating it as requiring execution, and imposed lesser penalties in cases brought before it.

The Portuguese Inquisition was established in 1536; and in 1539 Henry, Archbishop of Braga (later cardinal and king of Portugal) became Grand Inquisitor. (An earlier appointment as Portuguese Grand Inquisitor was Friar Diogo da Silva.) It received 4,419 denunciations against individuals accused of sodomy, of whom 447 were subjected to a formal trial, and thirty were burnt at the stake, in accordance with the pre-1536 civil laws enacted under Kings Afonso V and Manuel I, and many others were sent to the galleys or to exile, temporary or permanent.

=== Council of Trent ===
Although homosexuality was not directly discussed at the 16th century Council of Trent, it did nevertheless commission the drawing up of a catechism (following the successful lead of some Protestants) which stated: "Neither fornicators nor adulterers, nor the effeminate nor sodomites shall possess the kingdom of God."

In Malta, governed by the Catholic military order the Knights Hospitaller, there was harsh prejudice and laws towards those who were found guilty or spoke openly of being involved in same-sex activity. English voyager and author William Lithgow, writing in March 1616, described how a Spanish soldier and a Maltese teenage boy were publicly burnt to ashes for confessing to having practiced sodomy together. As a consequence, about a hundred men involved sailed to Sicily the following day to escape the regime.

== Modern Age ==
=== Vatican Councils ===
Neither the First Vatican Council nor the Second Vatican Council directly discussed the issue of homosexuality, but nor did they alter the judgement of earlier councils. However, homosexual activity frequently remained referenced in general church documents where appropriate as crimen pessimum (the worst crime), including that codified in 1917.

According to the Catechism of Saint Pius X, sodomy is one of the four sins that "are said to cry to God for vengeance".

=== Modern-day popes ===
==== Pope Paul VI ====
In 1976, Pope Paul VI became the first pontiff in modern history to deny the accusation of homosexuality against him. In January 1976, he had published a homily, Persona Humana: Declaration on Certain Questions concerning Sexual Ethics, that outlawed premarital and extra-marital sex, condemned homosexuality, and forbade masturbation. In response, Roger Peyrefitte—who had already written in two of his books that Paul VI had engaged in a longtime homosexual relationship—repeated his charges in an interview with a French gay magazine. When reprinted in Italian, this interview brought the rumors to a wider public and caused an uproar. Peyrefitte asserted that Paul VI was a hypocrite who had participated in a long-term sexual relationship with a movie actor. Widespread rumors identified the actor as Paolo Carlini, who had played a small part in the Audrey Hepburn film Roman Holiday (1953). In a brief address to a crowd of approximately 20,000 in St. Peter's Square on 18 April, Montini called the charges "horrible and slanderous insinuations" and appealed for prayers on his behalf. Special prayers for Pope Paul VI were said in all Italian Roman Catholic churches in "a day of consolation". (Note: In 1984, Paul Hofmann, a former correspondent for the New York Times, repeated the allegations.) The charges have resurfaced periodically. In 1994, Franco Bellegrandi, a former Vatican honour chamberlain and correspondent for the Vatican newspaper L'Osservatore Romano, alleged that Paul VI had been blackmailed and had promoted fellow homosexuals to positions of power within the Vatican. In 2006, the newspaper L'Espresso reported that the private papers of police commander General Giorgio Manes accepted the blackmail story as true, and that they claimed Italian Prime Minister Aldo Moro had been asked to help.

==== Pope John Paul II ====
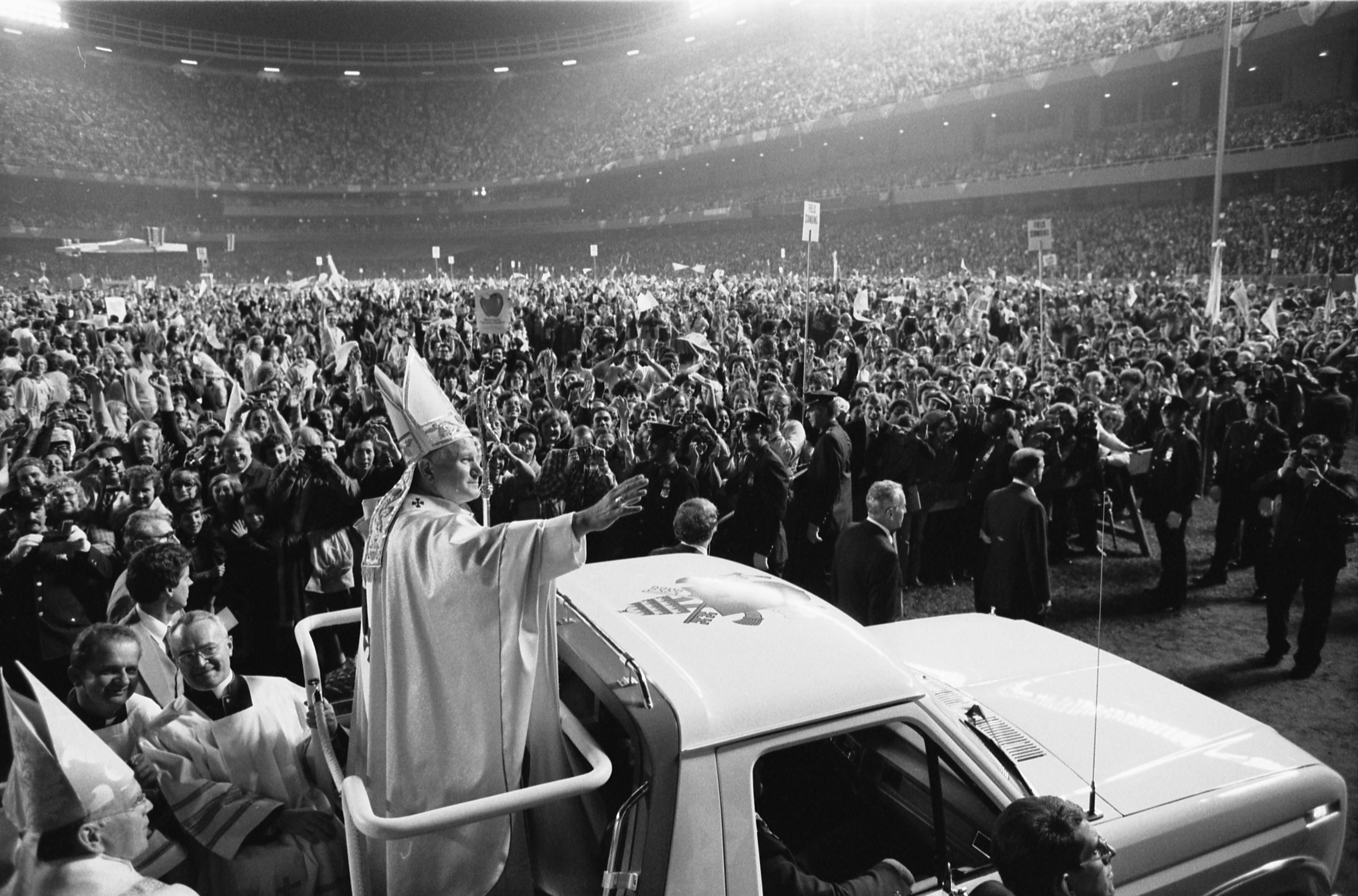
Pope John Paul II in Old Yankee Stadium, 1979

Homosexuality received no mention in papal encyclicals until Pope John Paul II's Veritatis Splendor of 1993, which "specifically proclaims the intrinsic evil of the homosexual condition" and rejected the view of some theologians who had begun to publicly question the basis upon which the Church had condemned homosexuality as morally unacceptable.

John Cornwell believes that the pontificate of John Paul II increasingly saw sexual morality as a paramount concern, and homosexuality, (alongside contraception, divorce and illicit unions), as a dimension of "the 'culture of death' against which he taught and preached with increasing vehemence".

In John Paul II's teaching, gay sex is regarded as a utilization of another's body, not a mutual self-giving in familial love, physically expressed by the masculine and feminine bodies; and such intercourse is also performed by a choice of the will, unlike homosexual orientation, which he acknowledged is usually not a matter of free choice.

On 5 October 1979, John Paul publicly praised the bishops of the United States for stating that "homosexual activity ... as distinguished from homosexual orientation, is morally wrong". He argued that, instead of "[holding] out false hope" to homosexuals facing hard moral problems, they had upheld "the true dignity, the true human dignity, of those who look to Christ's Church for the guidance which comes from the light of God's word".

In 2000, he criticized the inaugural WorldPride event scheduled for Rome in that year as "an affront to the Great Jubilee of the year 2000" and as "an offence to the Christian values" of Rome. He also spoke of his "bitterness" after church officials had lobbied and failed to cancel the festival. He also cited the Catholic catechism that "homosexual acts go against natural law" but "every sign of unjust discrimination in their regard should be avoided".

In response, the Dutch gay magazine Gay Krant and its readership initiated a case against him in the Dutch law courts, arguing that his comment that gay sex is contrary to the laws of nature "give rise to hatred against, and discrimination of certain groups of people" in violation of Dutch law. This came to an end when the court ruled that he was immune from prosecution as a head of state (the Vatican).

In his last personal work, Memory and Identity, published in 2005, John Paul II referred to the "pressures" on the European Parliament to permit "homosexual 'marriage'". He wrote: "It is legitimate and necessary to ask oneself if this is not perhaps part of a new ideology of evil, perhaps more insidious and hidden, which attempts to pit human rights against the family and against man".

==== Benedict XVI ====
On 9 March 2012, Pope Benedict XVI, denouncing "the powerful political and cultural currents seeking to alter the legal definition of marriage", currents that The Washington Post described as a "cultural shift toward gay marriage in U.S.", told a group of United States bishops on their ad limina visit to Rome that "the Church's conscientious effort to resist this pressure calls for a reasoned defense of marriage as a natural institution consisting of a specific communion of persons, essentially rooted in the complementarity of the sexes and oriented to procreation. Sexual differences cannot be dismissed as irrelevant to the definition of marriage."

An essay by the French Chief Rabbi Gilles Bernheim taking a clear position against gay marriage and denouncing the theory of acquired gender was quoted at length by Pope Benedict XVI in his 2012 Christmas address to the Roman Curia.

The BBC reported that shortly before the resignation of Pope Benedict XVI in February 2013, the Italian media in particular used unsourced reports to suggest that there was a "gay lobby" of clergy inside the Vatican who had been collaborating to advance personal interests, thereby opening the Holy See to potential blackmail, and even to suggest that this may have been one of the factors influencing Benedict's decision to resign.

==== Francis ====
Pope Francis had repeatedly spoken about the need for the church to welcome and love all people, regardless of their sexual orientation. Speaking about gay people in 2013, he said that "the key is for the church to welcome, not exclude and show mercy, not condemnation." In July of that year, he said "If a person is gay and seeks God and has good will, who am I to judge?" "The problem," he said, "is not having this orientation. We must be brothers."

Several LGBT groups welcomed the comments, noting that this was the first time a pope had used the word "gay" in public, and had also accepted the existence of gay people as a recognizable part of the Catholic Church community. The Pope's attitude towards homosexuality earned him a place on the cover of the US gay news magazine The Advocate. In October 2016, Francis said that "When a person (who is gay) arrives before Jesus, Jesus certainly will not say, 'Go away because you are homosexual'".

Francis had also spoken of the importance of education in the context of the difficulties now facing children, indicating that the Church had a challenge in not being welcoming enough of children brought up in a multiplicity of household arrangements, specifically including the children of gay couples. Francis presided over the 2014 Synod on the Family, where the working document called for less judgment towards people that are gay and more understanding towards same-sex couples in civil unions or marriages, as well as an equal welcome for children of such couples (including conferring baptism), while still rejecting the validity of same-sex marriage itself.

In the post-synodal apostolic exhortation Amoris Laetitia, issued in 2016, Francis encouraged better understanding from all members of the Church on the acceptance of gay people, without suggesting any specific doctrinal changes. He reiterated the need for every person to be respected regardless of their sexual orientation, and to be free from threats of aggression and violence. During Pope Francis's visit to Ireland in August 2018 he built on this theme. The pontiff made clear that gay people had always been present throughout human history, and that it was essential for parents to remember that gay children remained part of the families and it was important for them to engage positively. In an accompanying press statement, he made clear that homosexuality should not be viewed by Catholics as an illness.

In 2019, during an interview with Spanish journalist Jordi Evole, Pope Francis brought up how Catholic teaching states that homosexual tendencies "are not a sin," while also saying that young children who exhibit unusual behaviors should see a professional as it may be for other reasons than them being gay.

On December 18, 2023, non-liturgical blessings of same-sex couples, not the unions themselves, were approved by Pope Francis and published in Fiducia supplicans, a document by the Dicastery for the Doctrine of the Faith, which stated that "...the Church does not have the power to impart blessings on unions of persons of the same sex."

=== HIV/AIDS ===
The Catholic Church's opposition to homosexuality and to safe sex measures drew negative attention during the AIDS crisis, although some Catholic hospitals also treated HIV/AIDS patients, and Catholic hospitals are currently a major provider of AIDS care.

Catholic hospitals were among the first to treat HIV/AIDS patients, (Note: Saint Clare's Hospital was the first hospital to provide care in New York.) in part due to the location of hospitals like St. Vincent's in New York near to gay districts. Early hospital security and policies that prevented partners of patients from visiting their loved ones, as well as the broader perception that the church's opposition to safe sex practices such as condom use were exacerbating the crisis, led ACT UP to hold protests such as Stop the Church.

The Catholic Church is a now world leader in the provision of care to victims of AIDS and, with over 117,000 health centers, it is also one of the largest providers. Catholic Church-related organizations also provide social services to people with AIDS. However, their opposition to safe sex measures such as condoms is a source of controversy, since condoms are impermeable to HIV and can prevent transmission.

=== Gay acceptance movements within the Church ===
==== 1960s ====
DignityUSA was founded in the United States in 1969 as the first group for gay and lesbian Catholics shortly after the Stonewall riots. It developed from the ministry of Father Patrick Xavier Nidorf, an Augustinian priest. It set out the belief that gay Catholics can "express our sexuality physically, in a unitive manner that is loving, life-giving, and life-affirming." It also seeks to "work for the development of sexual theology leading to the reform of [the Church's] teachings and practices regarding human sexuality, and for the acceptance of gay, lesbian, bisexual and transgender peoples as full and equal members of the one Christ." Meetings were initially held in San Diego and Los Angeles, before the organization ultimately became headquartered in Boston. It later spread to Canada.

==== 1970s ====
Following the US Bishops’ 1976 Call To Action conference in Detroit, a group called Call to Action (CTA) was established to advocate a variety of changes in the Catholic Church, including in the church's teaching on sexual matters such as homosexuality. In addition to the US bishops' conference, it drew its mission from the Second Vatican Council, and in particular to its challenge to lay Catholics who had tended to defer initiatives entirely to the clergy.

New Ways Ministry was set up in 1977 in the United States of America by the Salvatorian priest Robert Nugent and the School Sisters of Notre Dame sister Jeannine Gramick. This was in response to Bishop Francis Mugavero of Brooklyn who had invited them to reach out in "new ways" to lesbian and gay Catholics. As early as February 1976, Mugavero issued a pastoral letter entitled "Sexuality: God's Gift," defending the legitimate rights of all people, including those who were gay and lesbian. He said that they had been "subject to misunderstanding and at times unjust discrimination." In addition to gay and lesbian Catholics, the letter also spoke to the widowed, adolescents, the divorced, and those having sexual relations outside of marriage, stating: "we pledge our willingness to help you ... to try to find new ways to communicate the truth of Christ because we believe it will make you free.

==== 1980s ====
In 1980, the Association of Priests in the Archdiocese of Chicago honored the Chicago branch of Dignity as the organization of the year. With the publication in 1987 of "On the Pastoral Care of Homosexual Persons," which instructed bishops not to provide facilities for organizations that did not uphold official Catholic teaching on homosexuality, Catholic bishops in Atlanta, Buffalo, Brooklyn, Pensacola and Vancouver immediately excluded Dignity chapters, and "within a few months the organization was unwelcome on church property anywhere."

In 1981, New Ways Ministry held its first national symposium on homosexuality and the Catholic Church, but Archbishop James Hickey of Washington, D.C., wrote to Catholic bishops and communities, asking them not to support the event. Despite this, more than fifty Catholic groups endorsed the program.

==== 1990s ====
In 1996, the bishop of Lincoln, Fabian Bruskewitz, excommunicated all members of Call to Action within his diocese. An appeal by the Nebraska Chapter was rejected by the Congregation for Bishops in 2006.

The Rainbow Sash Movement was established in Australia in 1998 and has been active in the United States, England, and Australia. The Rainbow Sash itself is a strip of a rainbow-colored fabric, which is worn over the left shoulder and is put on at the beginning of the Mass as a symbol of sexuality. At the appropriate time, members go up to receive communion. If denied, they return to their pew and remain standing, but if the Eucharist is received, then they return to their pew and kneel in the traditional way. The Catholic Church teaches that the Eucharist is a sign of unity, and that it can be denied when receiving it would be seen as an act of division or a display of opposition to the Church's teaching.

Both Nugent and Grammick of New Ways Ministry were formally disciplined in 1999 when the Vatican imposed lifetime bans on any pastoral work involving gay people, declaring that the positions they advanced "do not faithfully convey the clear and constant teaching of the Catholic Church" and "have caused confusion among the Catholic people." The move made Nugent and Gramick "folk heroes in liberal circles," where official teaching was seen as outdated and lacking compassion. Similarly, the American bishops Thomas Gumbleton of Detroit and Matthew Clark of Rochester, New York, were criticized for their association with New Ways Ministry, and their alleged "distortion" of the theological concept of the primacy of conscience as an alternative to the teaching of the Catholic Church.

==== 2010s ====
In 2013, members of the Rainbow Sash Movement in Illinois planned to hold a prayer service in a cathedral for legalization of same-sex marriage, an initiative that Bishop Paprocki of Springfield called blasphemous.

In 2018, Fr. Paul Kalchik in Avondale, Chicago, burned a banner depicting a lavender cross superimposed over a rainbow, which he described as "propaganda," following a prayer of exorcism. He had previously destroyed rainbow vestments left behind by the three priests that served the parish prior to his arrival in 2007. The banner had originally been displayed at the altar by one of those predecessors in 1991 to welcome LGBTQ worshipers. However, Kalchik believed that his predecessors had erroneously promoted the "gay lifestyle" and that the sexual abuse crisis in the Catholic church was "definitely a gay thing." Cardinal Blase J. Cupich intervened but failed to stop the burning.

==== 2020s ====
In October 2020, the documentary film Francesco, which contains an earlier 2019 interview Pope Francis did for the Mexican broadcaster Televisa, is released and shows the pope endorsing for same-sex couples "convivencia civil" (in Spanish); this remark, aired only later for the film, was translated to "civil union" in the subtitles of the film. This has been picked up by the media as Pope Francis supporting same-sex civil union. Some Spanish-speaking Catholic priests said the translation was inaccurate. Archbishop Víctor Manuel Fernández of La Plata, long-time theological advisor of Pope Francis, has defended that the two expressions "unión civil" and "ley de convivencia civil" are often used interchangeably in Argentina when speaking about laws, and designate a civil union. In May 2021 and May 2022 in over hundred Roman Catholic churches in Germany blessing of same-sex marriages were celebrated for example in the cathedral of Magdeburg or in Essen, where German Roman Catholic bishop Ludger Schepers was at place.

In January 2023 in an interview with the Associated Press Pope Francis stated laws that criminalise homosexuality as “unjust”, saying God loves all his children just as they are. Pope Francis later clarified this interview saying in reference to it "As you can see, I was repeating something in general. I should have said, 'It is a sin, as is any sexual act outside of marriage'" he wrote. In February 2023, Pope Francis said, that criminalization of same-sexual acts in several countries in Africa/in Asia is wrong, a sin and an injustice. On March 11, 2023, the Synodal Path with support of over 80 percentage of German Roman Catholic bishops allowed blessing ceremonies for same-sex couples in all 27 German Roman Catholic diocese in contradiction and contravention of the ruling from the Congregation for the Doctrine of the Faith in the Vatican in 2021 which expressly forbid this, stating that the Catholic Church won't bless same-sex unions since God “cannot bless sin.”. The process underpinning this pathway has however been described as "neither helpful nor serious" by Pope Francis. In further comments by Pope Francis in reference to the German Synodal path, he has also warned that "the danger is that something very, very ideological trickles in" and describes the process as "elite" because it doesn't involve "all the people of God."

On December 18, 2023, non-liturgical blessings of same-sex couples, not the illicit unions themselves, were approved by Pope Francis and published in Fiducia supplicans, a document by the Dicastery for the Doctrine of the Faith, which stated that "...the Church does not have the power to impart blessings on unions of persons of the same sex." In April 2025, German Roman-Catholic bishop conference published a manual for blessing ceremonies for sames-sex unions.

In 2025, an LGBTQ pilgrimage was included in the Vatican's Jubilee program for the first time; it was noted with the title "Pilgrimage of the Tenda di Gionata Association (Jonathan's Tent) and other associations" on the Vatican's official Holy Year calendar's website. Its pilgrims came from Brazil, Italy, and the U.S.

== See also ==
- History of Christianity and homosexuality
- Catholic teaching on homosexuality
- Pastoral care for gay Catholics
- Dissent from Catholic teaching on homosexuality
- Homosexuality and Roman Catholic priests
- Gay bishops
- Political activity of the Catholic Church on LGBT issues
- List of LGBT Catholics
