= Pastoral care for LGBTQ Catholics =

Pastoral care for LGBT Catholics consists of the ministry and outreach the Catholic Church provides to LGBTQ Catholics.

There are official organizations, such as Courage International, as well as stand-alone events, scholarly studies, comments, and teachings from the highest levels of the Catholic Church, as well as individual parish outreach.

== Vatican ==
=== Pope John Paul II ===
During the pontificate of Pope John Paul II, the Congregation for the Doctrine of the Faith issued a letter that asked "the bishops to support, with the means at their disposal, the development of appropriate forms of pastoral care for homosexual persons.”

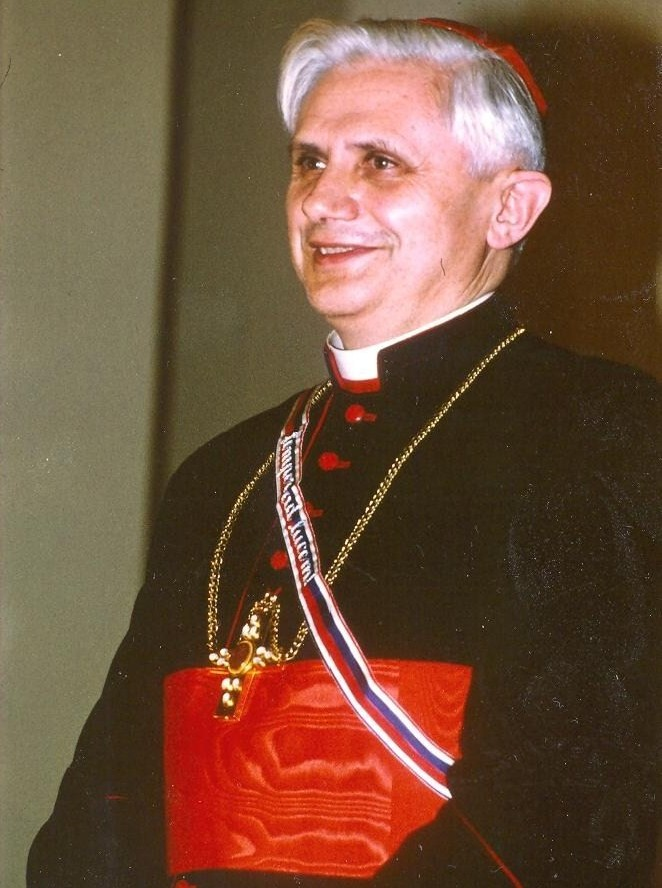
Pope Benedict XVI, as a cardinal in 1986, signed the CDF letter on the Pastoral Care of Homosexuals.

This letter, addressed to all the bishops of the Catholic Church, was entitled On the Pastoral Care of Homosexual Persons. This was signed by Cardinal Joseph Ratzinger as prefect. The letter gave instructions on how the clergy should deal with, and respond to, lesbian, gay, and bisexual people. Designed to remove any ambiguity about permissible tolerance of homosexual orientation resulting from the earlier Persona Humana—and prompted by the growing influence of gay-accepting groups and clergy—the letter was particularly aimed at the church in the United States.

It affirmed the position that while homosexual orientation is not in itself a sin, it is nevertheless a tendency towards the "moral evil" of homosexual activity, and therefore must be considered "an objective disorder". The letter went on to say that when homosexual activity is the result of deliberate choice, it is not made inculpable by natural sexual orientation. Furthermore, the letter argues that this natural homosexual orientation is "essentially self-indulgent" since homosexual sexual acts are not procreative and therefore not genuinely loving or selfless.

The letter condemned physical and verbal violence against gay people, but asserted that condemnation of violence did not mean that the homosexual orientation was good or neutral or that homosexual sexual acts should be permitted. However, it added that human beings, being made in the image and likeness of God, could not be reduced to either heterosexuals or homosexuals. Instead, it affirmed that every person, gay or straight, "has a fundamental identity: a creature of God, and by grace, his child and heir to eternal life."

The letter also said that accepting homosexual acts as morally equivalent to married heterosexual acts was harmful to the family and society and warned bishops to be on guard against, and not to support, Catholic organizations not upholding the Church's doctrine on homosexuality—groups which the letter said were not really Catholic. This alluded to LGBT and LGBT-accepting Catholic groups such as DignityUSA and New Ways Ministry, and ultimately resulted in the exclusion of Dignity from Church property.

Critics have described the document as teaching "that a gay male or lesbian sexual identity is not to be celebrated, nor is it properly seen as a source of pride". The claims that accepting and legalizing homosexual behaviour leads to violence were seen as controversially blaming gay people for homophobic violence and encouraging homophobic violence. Referring to the AIDS epidemic, the letter, McNeill writes, blamed AIDS on gay rights activists and gay-accepting mental health professionals: "Even when the practice of homosexuality may seriously threaten the lives and well-being of a large number of people, its advocates remain undeterred and refuse to consider the magnitude of the risks involved". Andrew Sullivan called this comment "extraordinary for its lack of compassion" and added that "some of [the letter's] clauses read chillingly like comparable church documents produced in Europe in the 1930s."

In a statement released in July 1992, the Congregation for the Doctrine of the Faith expanded on the letter and stated that discrimination against gay people in certain areas, such as selecting adoptive or foster parents or in hiring teachers, coaches, or military service members, is not unjust, and thus permitted.

=== Pope Francis ===
In an interview on 28 July 2013, when discussing homosexuals (both in general and their place in the clergy) and answering a question as to whether there was a "gay lobby" in the Vatican, Pope Francis said, "If someone is gay and is searching for the Lord and has good will, then who am I to judge him? The Catechism of the Catholic Church explains this in a beautiful way, saying...: 'no one should marginalize these people for this, they must be integrated into society.'" According to two gay rights activists, Marcelo Márquez and Andrés Albertsen, Pope Francis expressed support for the spiritual needs of "homosexual people" and willingness to support "measured actions" on their behalf in private conversations with them. These remarks have been seen as an encouraging change of tone from the papacy, so much so that the American LGBTQ magazine The Advocate named Pope Francis their Person of the Year for 2013.

On 2 October 2016, Pope Francis spoke in favor of pastoral care for and including transgender Catholics in the church, stating priests should "accompany them spiritually" and that they should never be turned away, even if they have undergone gender transition and sex-reassignment operations. Francis once held an audience with a Spanish transgender man, who had transitioned from female to male, and his wife.

In April 2018 Pope Francis met with Juan Carlos Cruz, a survivor of sexual abuse by Chilean priest Fernando Karadima. Cruz discussed with Francis in detail how his sexual orientation was used by Latin American media and news outlets to discredit his report of abuse and label him as a pervert and liar. In a private conversation between the two, Francis reportedly said to Cruz, who is gay, in regards to his sexuality, "You know Juan Carlos, that does not matter. God made you like this. God loves you like this. The Pope loves you like this and you should love yourself and not worry about what people say."

On 26 August 2018, in the plane in the return journey from Ireland to Rome, Pope Francis said that homosexual people existed in the whole history of humankind. He also said Catholic parents should talk with their homosexual children and that they should not be "throw[n] out" of the family. In the retranscription of the Pope's statement the following day, the sentence "When it [homosexuality] shows itself from childhood, there is a lot that can be done through psychiatry, to see how things are. It is something else if it shows itself after 20 years" was removed from the official transcription; an official from the Vatican stated it was done in order not to change "the thoughts of the Holy Father".

In an interview for the film Francesco, Pope Francis supported same sex civil union, stating that "Homosexuals have a right to be a part of the family. [...] What we have to create is a civil union law. That way they are legally covered. I stood up for that."

=== 2014 Synod on the Family ===
At the 2014 Synod on the Family, the interim report asked if the Church was capable of guaranteeing gay Catholics "a place of fellowship in our communities" and "accepting and valuing their sexual orientation, without compromising Catholic doctrine on the family and matrimony." It added that gay people have "gifts and qualities to offer the Christian community." Cardinal Donald Wuerl argued that it was "not so much a change in the teaching of the Church, but a way of saying it that is far more inviting, far more welcoming."

The final report speaks of the giving of appropriate pastoral care, in harmony with the Church's teaching, to LGBT Catholics and that gay people "ought to be received with respect and sensitivity." After the vote, Archbishop Paul-André Durocher wrote on his blog that "I have the impression many would have preferred a more open, positive language. Not finding it in this paragraph, they might have chosen to indicate their disapproval of it." Cardinal Vincent Nichols said he did not think it a good paragraph, because the absence of the key words "respect", "welcome", and "value" meant it did not go far enough. He gave assurance that there was no question in the synod of endorsing the idea of same-sex marriage or of changing the Church's teaching on sexual morality. Other bishops worried that more welcoming language "could be read as code-words for the Catholic Church going soft on its moral teaching."

The interim report's statements on homosexuality were described by gay rights advocates as "a seismic shift in tone toward acceptance of gays." One priest commentator said that the language used "represents a revolutionary change in how the church addresses the LGBTQ community," pointing to the document's lack of use of phrases such as "intrinsically disordered." The attitude change on homosexuality signaled by the interim report was welcomed by gay groups such as DignityUSA, who said that the "positive language" used "is more affirming and will give many people hope."

=== 2015 Synod on the Family ===
At the larger follow-up Synod on the Family in 2015, Courage International and Ignatius Press sponsored an event at the Angelicum on homosexuality that featured Cardinals Robert Sarah and George Pell. The Global Network of Rainbow Catholics also held an event that they said hoped would bring "LGBT voices to the Synod" at the Centre for Pilgrims Santa Teresa Couderc.

During the Synod debates, the rejection of "exclusionary language" towards gays was a topic of discussion. One Synod member, who was not publicly identified, said that gay Catholics "are our children. They are family members. They are not outsiders. They are our flesh and blood. How do we speak about them [positively] and offer a hand of welcome?" According to Archbishop Mark Coleridge of Australia, there was strong support in the early days of the assembly for using a "less condemnatory approach," especially regarding language, when pastorally caring for and speaking about gay Catholics, on the order of 70% in favor and 30% opposed.

Archbishop Charles Chaput of the United States echoed this thought in an interview, saying that the phrase "intrinsically disordered" turns people off and "probably isn’t useful anymore." While making clear that any new language adopted should make clear the Church's teaching, he said that this particular phrase should be put "on the shelf for a while, until we get over the negativity related to it." Irish Archbishop Diarmuid Martin also told the assembly that the successful campaign in his country to legalize gay marriage used "what was traditionally our language: equality, compassion, respect and tolerance."

The final report repeated Church teaching that every person, gay or straight, should be treated with dignity and not face unjust discrimination, but also reaffirmed that marriage was between a man and a woman. It did not describe how the Church should minister directly to them, but did say that there should be outreach.

=== 2018 Synod on Youth ===
The 2018 Synod of Bishops focused on youth and the issues facing them. Among other topics, the concerns of LGBT youth were to be discussed.

In responses to surveys distributed by the Church, many LBGT youth said they wish to "‘benefit from a greater closeness’ and experience greater care from the Church." As such, the concerns of gay youth "who, above all, want to remain close to the Church," will be a special concern. The preparatory working document also insisted that the Church must be open and welcoming to all, including LGBT Catholics, those of other faiths, and those of no faith at all. Secretary General Lorenzo Baldisseri said at the release of the working document that the Church was making a special effort to engage the LGBT community because "we are open. We don't want to be closed in on ourselves."

The Synod also discussed the challenges the Church sometimes has in explaining the Church's teaching on sexuality to contemporary society. Saying that "No bishops’ conference offers solutions or recipes,” the document insisted that "the question of sexuality must be discussed more openly and without prejudice."

The preparatory working document for the synod used the acronym LGBT, the first time it had been used in an official Vatican document. It stated that “some LGBT youth” wanted to “benefit from greater closeness and experience greater care by the church.”

=== Pontifical Biblical Commission ===
In December 2019, the Pontifical Biblical Commission published a book length document, "What is Man? An Itinerary of Biblical Anthropology," that includes a nine-page discussion of homosexuality. It calls on the church to provide more pastoral care for LGBT Catholics in order "to implement that service of good that the Church must assume in its mission on behalf of mankind."

=== Fiducia supplicans ===
On December 18, 2023, blessings of same-sex couples in certain circumstances in the document Fiducia supplicans were approved by Pope Francis and published by the Dicastery for the Doctrine of the Faith.

== United States ==
=== United States Conference of Catholic Bishops ===
The National Conference of Bishops met with DignityUSA in 1975. At a 1976 conference on social justice, five of the Conference's recommendations promoted pastoral care for LGBT people and opposed discrimination against them.

In the same year, the Conference wrote to American Catholics that gay men and women "should have an active role in the Christian community." The bishops added that "the Christian community should provide [LGBT people] a special degree of pastoral understanding and care."

==== Human Sexuality: A Catholic Perspective for Education and Lifelong Learning ====
The US bishops called on "all Christians and citizens of good will" in 1991 "to confront their own fears about homosexuality and to curb the humor and discrimination that offend homosexual persons. We understand that having a homosexual orientation brings with it enough anxiety, pain and issues related to self-acceptance without society bringing additional prejudicial treatment."

==== Always Our Children ====
The bishops of the United States published in 1997 a letter entitled Always Our Children, as a pastoral message to parents of gay and bisexual children with guidelines for pastoral ministers. It told parents not to break off contact with a gay or bisexual son or daughter; they should instead look for appropriate counseling both for the child and for themselves. The letter said that, while homosexual orientation is not sinful, homosexual activity is immoral, but gay people must be accepted with respect, compassion, and sensitivity, and allowed to participate actively in the Christian community, and even, if living chastely, to hold leadership positions.

One of the pastoral recommendations it made to church ministers was to "welcome homosexual persons into the faith community, and seek out those on the margins. Avoid stereotyping and condemning. Strive first to listen. Do not presume that all homosexual persons are sexually active. Learn more about homosexuality and church teaching so your preaching, teaching, and counseling will be informed and effective."

It added that "it is not sufficient only to avoid unjust discrimination. Homosexual persons 'must be accepted with respect, compassion and sensitivity.'" It also noted "an importance and urgency" to minister to those with AIDS, especially considering the impact it had on the gay community, and the bishops "reject[ed] the idea that HIV/AIDS is a direct punishment from God." They closed by saying that "nothing in the Bible or in Catholic teaching can be used to justify prejudicial or discriminatory attitudes and behaviors."

==== Guidelines for Pastoral Care ====
The 2006 Guidelines for Pastoral Care issued by the Bishops' Conference said it was "sad to say" that many LGBT Catholics felt unwelcome, rejected, and alienated from the Church. The document called for "outreach programs and evangelization efforts... to be mindful of such persons," and said that a "welcoming stance of Christian love by the leadership and the community as a whole is essential for this important work." It also says: "It is deplorable that homosexual persons have been and are the object of violent malice in speech or in action. Such treatment deserves condemnation from the Church’s pastors wherever it occurs."

=== Diocesan efforts ===
==== Ministries ====
Bishop Walter Sullivan established the first diocesan pastoral outreach program to LBGT Catholics in the US, the Sexual Minorities Commission, in 1976. Also that year, Bishop Francis Mugavero called for the church to provide greater "pastoral understanding and care" for LGBT people. The Diocese of Trenton established a position to reach out to sexual minorities in 1979.

The National Association of Catholic Diocesan Lesbian and Gay Ministries (later the Catholic Association for Lesbian and Gay Ministry) was established in 1995. By 1997 it represented over 30 dioceses from around the United States and had an executive director. As of 2012, it had more than 200 caregivers in 25 states and an office in Berkeley, California.

The Diocese of San Jose in California has a Catholic LGBT Ministry Council. Along other things, it hosts a monthly "All Are Welcome" Mass at a rotating parish throughout the diocese. The Archdiocese of Los Angeles has a Catholic Ministry with Lesbian and Gay Persons that was established in 1986, shortly after Roger Mahony was established as archbishop. The Archdiocese of Seattle established a ministry in 1988.

By 1990, there were also official ministries in St. Augustine and Los Angeles. By 2001, ministries in the Diocese of Cleveland, the Archdiocese of Cincinnati, Diocese of Orlando, the Diocese of Charlotte, and the Diocese of Rochester were established.

Joseph Michael Sullivan, auxiliary bishop of the Diocese of Brooklyn and chairman of the Social Development and World Peace Department of the United States Conference of Catholic Bishops, commissioned a docudrama of the lives of LGBT clerics and laity. Full of Grace was performed to coincide with the first visit of Pope Francis to Philadelphia in 2015. Charles J. Chaput, the archbishop of Philadelphia, had given instructions that no LGBT-related event could take place at a Catholic building during the Pope's visit to the World Meeting of Families and had several Catholic groups evicted from Catholic premises. As a result, Full of Grace, a Catholic docudrama, was performed at a Protestant church—Philadelphia's historic Christ Church—days before the Pope arrived.

==== Masses, synods, and pilgrimages ====
At a 1997 Mass for LGBT Catholics and their families at the Cathedral of the Sacred Heart in Richmond, Virginia, Bishop Walter Sullivan opened the liturgy by saying, "You belong here. It’s about time somebody says that to you."

Robert W. McElroy, the Bishop of San Diego, held a diocesan synod on the family in October 2016 that called for improved ministry toward gay and lesbian Catholics. "Our belief is that all people who are gay or lesbian or transsexual or bisexual, all those who face issues of sexuality, they are all members of our family and the family of God," McElroy said. The summer before, the diocese invited the local chapter of DignityUSA to attend "Catholic Night" at a San Diego Padres game.

In June 2017, Cardinal Joseph Tobin, Archbishop of Newark in the US, held a "Pilgrimage" Mass specifically for LGBT Catholics from around New York and the five dioceses in New Jersey at the Cathedral Basilica of the Sacred Heart. Many of the attendees were married to same-sex spouses and received communion. It was reported, however, that Tobin subsequently received hate-mail from Catholics opposed to the move. The director of New Ways Ministry indicated that this was a positive first step, contrasting with a church leadership that has for decades "been so silent, and unwilling to dialogue, and unwilling to pray with L.G.B.T. Catholics". The event was organized by gay ministries at the Church of the Sacred Heart in South Plainfield, New Jersey, and the Church of the Precious Blood in Monmouth Beach.

==== Writings ====
Bishop Thomas V. Daily issued a pastoral letter in 1993 in which he said: "It is evident that the pastoral care of our homosexual brothers and sisters is increasingly becoming a matter of urgency in our society." Daily wrote that "The homosexual person, striving to live a chaste life, is no different than any other human person and is to be afforded the same respect, Christian love and dignity." He added that "It is deplorable when homosexual persons are the object of malice in speech or in action or when they are deprived of their basic human rights. Prejudice and discrimination against homosexual persons are not only uncharitable, they are unjust."

Calling on the Church to do more, Bishop Walter Sullivan wrote in 1983 that

“we cannot remain satisfied that, once we have clearly articulated the official Church position on homosexuality, nothing else remains to be done in the area of pastoral care for homosexual people and education on this topic for the larger human community, including the families and friends of homosexual people. This is especially true in those cases where the teaching of the Church itself has been presented in such a way that it has been the source or occasion of some of the pain and alienation that many homosexual Catholics experience. We cannot overlook those injustices, including rejection, hostility, or indifference on the part of Christians, that have resulted in a denial of respect or of full participation in the community for homosexual people. We must examine our own hearts and consciences and know that each of us stands in need of real conversion in this area."

==== Comments ====
During Lent in the Great Jubilee of 2000, Cardinal Roger Mahony apologized to those that he or the Roman Catholic Church may have offended, including: “I ask pardon of our Catholic homosexual and lesbian members when the church has appeared to be non-supportive of their struggles or of falling into homophobia.”

Cardinal Blase Cupich of Chicago has also suggested that the Catholic Church should respect and use words such as "gay" and "lesbian" as a way of more effectively reaching out to the LGBT community.

=== Clergy and Religious ===
The National Federation of Priests' Councils adopted a platform supporting the "civil rights of homosexual persons" in 1974. The National Coalition of American Nuns adopted a similar stance the same year.

In 2018, the Association of U.S. Catholic Priests adopted a resolution calling for the church to adopt more welcoming language when speaking about LGBT people, and for church-wide ministries for them and their families.

== England and Wales ==
The Catholic Bishops of England & Wales issued "An Introduction to the Pastoral Care of Homosexual People" in 1979. It repeated Catholic teaching that sexual activity was only licit within a marriage and that both homosexual and heterosexual orientations are morally neutral.

The Introduction stated that all Catholics, including LGBT Catholics, have equal rights to the sacraments and it strongly denounced prejudice and discrimination: "As a group that has suffered more than its share of oppression and contempt, the homosexual community has a particular claim upon the concern of the church." It added: "Homosexuals have a right to enlightened and effective pastoral care with pastoral ministers who are properly trained to meet their pastoral needs."

After the 1999 London nail bombings that targeted London's LGBT population, special Masses were held that specifically welcomed lesbian and gay Catholics, their parents, and families. It resulted in a vibrant community being formed with new converts to Catholicism, and it attracted the attention and support of Cardinal Cormac Murphy O'Connor. In 2007, a special ministry for LGBT Catholics, particularly those in Soho and Piccadilly, was established.

In the early 21st century, the Church of Our Lady of the Assumption and St Gregory in Soho hosted "one of the most successful LGBT Catholic parishes in the world". For six years, these "Soho Masses" offered twice-monthly services "particularly welcoming to lesbian, gay, bisexual, and transgendered Catholics, their parents, friends and families". In 2013, under pressure from the Vatican, they were forced to move to Church of the Immaculate Conception, Farm Street, in nearby Mayfair; Archbishop Vincent Nichols attended their first Mass there in 2013.

Cardinal Basil Hume stated that "Homophobia should have no place among Catholics. Catholic teaching on homosexuality is not founded on, and can never be used to justify homophobic attitudes." He has also said: "In upholding the dignity of people who are homosexual the Church is being consistent to its teaching." Hume also taught that, in addition to prayer and the sacraments, pastoral care for LGBT Catholics should include "a respectful attitude and a sympathetic understanding."

== Elsewhere ==
In Germany, Cardinal Reinhard Marx, president of the German Bishops’ Conference, called on German priests to provide better pastoral care for gay Catholics. Bishop Charles Scicluna of Malta attended a May 2014 event organised by the Maltese Catholic gay rights group Drachma to mark International Day Against Homophobia, Transphobia and Biphobia.

In Ireland, Archbishop Diarmuid Martin of Dublin reacted to concerns over anti-gay comments in the media by saying that "anybody who doesn't show love towards gay and lesbian people is insulting God. They are not just homophobic if they do that — they are actually Godophobic because God loves every one of those people." In April 2016, the Bishop of Lexington in Kentucky, John Stowe, spoke at a New Ways Ministry national conference and indicated that he admired and respected LGBT people who remained steadfast to the church even though the church had not always been as welcoming.

Italian Archbishop Matteo Zuppi has said that Church teachings on sexual ethics "have not been followed up with a commensurate pastoral program—one that doesn't simply restrict itself to the cold application of doctrinal guidelines, but instead transforms them into a journey of accompaniment."

== Organizations ==
=== Courage International ===
In response to the push within the United States for greater recognition within the Church for gay men and lesbian women, Cardinal Terence Cooke of New York City invited John Harvey to establish a ministry that would reach-out and minister to gay Catholics to help them "live chaste lives in fellowship, truth, and love." Initially Harvey worked with Benedict Groeschel of the Franciscan Friars of the Renewal to establish Courage International in 1979. The first meeting was held in September 1980 at the Shrine of Mother Seton in South Ferry, and chapters were subsequently established in a small number of other countries (Canada, Australia and 11 Latin American and European countries). Up until the 1990s the organisation was an active supporter of conversion therapy, believing gay people could be turned "straight." The organization no longer supports conversion therapy.

The group generally consists of laymen and laywomen usually under anonymous discretion, together with a priest, to encourage its members to abstain from acting on their sexual desires and to live chastely according to the Catholic Church's teachings on homosexuality." Its annual conference in the US usually attracts around 350 delegates. The organisation has been criticised by Catholic gay groups such as New Ways Ministry who argue that outreach and welcoming needs to also extend to those who do have sexual relationships. Critics have also complained that Courage is effectively promoting is "mandatory celibacy for gays and lesbians."

=== Global Network of Rainbow Catholics ===
The Global Network of Rainbow Catholics, an organization of 13 different groups ministering to LGBT Catholics, met for the first time at the 2014 Synod on the Family. They held an event in Rome titled "LGBT Voices to the Synod" at the 2015 Synod on the family.

At the close of the Synod they said that they were hopeful and felt it was the "beginning of a new era of inclusive pastoral care for and with LGBT people and their families." In their statement the network said that while they had hoped the Synod would go further, they appreciated the “expressions of apology” for what it termed “harmful and inaccurate language” sometimes used when discussing gay people.

=== New Ways Ministry ===
New Ways Ministry was founded in 1977 by Sister Jeannine Gramick and Father Robert Nugent after Bishop Francis Mugavero called on Catholics to reach out in "new ways" to lesbian and gay Catholics.

== Publications ==
=== Building a Bridge ===
In 2017, Rev. James Martin, a Jesuit priest in the US, published Building a Bridge: How the Catholic Church and the L.G.B.T. Community Can Enter Into a Relationship of Respect, Compassion and Sensitivity. In the book, Martin outlines several ways each side can treat the other more charitably: for example, calling on church leaders to use terms like "gay" and "L.G.B.T.", instead of phrases like "afflicted with same-sex attraction". The preface to the Italian version of the book was written by Archbishop Matteo Zuppi of Bologna. The book has also been translated into Dutch, French, German, and Korean.

Martin also argued that to expect a sinless lifestyle from gay Catholics, but not from any other group, is a form of "unjust discrimination" and that gay people should not be fired for marrying a same-sex spouse. Cardinal Joseph Tobin and Cardinal Kevin Farrell contributed blurbs to the book. However, a number of Catholic institutes, including Theological College in Washington, The Order of the Holy Sepulchre in New York, and Cafod in the UK subsequently cancelled events at which Martin was due to speak, after pressure from conservative Catholics who threatened to withhold funding. Robert McElroy, the Bishop of San Diego, rallied to support Martin and criticized those who had tried to vilify him and distort his writings.

Martin was subsequently invited to give a keynote address at the Vatican-sponsored World Meeting of Families held in Dublin in summer 2018.

== See also ==
- History of Christianity and homosexuality
- Ministry to Persons with a Homosexual Inclination
- On the Pastoral Care of Homosexual Persons
- History of the Catholic Church and homosexuality
- Dissent from Catholic teaching on homosexuality
- Homosexuality and Roman Catholic priests
- Gay bishops
- Political activity of the Catholic Church on LGBT issues
- List of LGBT Catholics
