= Catholics United =

LGBT Christian organization

Catholics United is a U.S.-based non-profit 501(c)(4) non-partisan political organization, that states that it is "dedicated to promoting the message of justice and the common good found at the heart of the Catholic social teaching." The group claims a total membership of 50,000. Though not affiliated and without any official status within the Catholic Church, it has had a significant effect on the religious and political debate in the U.S.

Catholics United has attracted controversy due to the Podesta emails, where it was suggested that it and similar organisations were created to advance progressive policies like health insurance covering contraceptives in Catholicism.

== History ==
Catholics United was founded in 2005 by Catholic social justice activists Chris Korzen and James Salt. It grew out of a 2004 effort called the Catholic Voting Project, which opposed Republican efforts to convince Catholic voters it was immoral to vote for U.S. presidential candidate John Kerry because he supported abortion rights. The current Executive Director James Salt has a background in working with national progressive Catholic peace and justice organizations as well as political campaigns involving Catholic strategy.

== Issues ==
=== Health care reform ===
In March 2010, Catholics United played a key role in convincing pro-life Catholic members of the U.S. House of Representatives to vote for the final passage of the Patient Protection and Affordable Care Act by running TV ads in several Congressional districts. The ads challenged claims by the U.S. Conference of Catholic Bishops as well as conservative groups that the bill allowed for federal funding of abortion.

=== Workers' rights and energy ===
In 2009, Catholics United ran radio ads featuring actor Martin Sheen in support of the Employee Free Choice Act. It also ran radio ads supporting the Energy Bill.

== Controversy ==
=== Abortion ===
The group has been criticized by Catholic bishops because of its opposition to criminalizing abortion, although not the U.S. Conference of Catholic Bishops as a whole.

Catholics United has condemned bishops who deny Communion to politicians who support legal abortion. It describes this as "a shameful attempt to use the Catholic sacrament of Communion as a political weapon."

=== Gay and lesbian advocacy ===
In March 2010, former director Chris Korzen appeared on CNN to challenge the Archdiocese of Washington, DC's protest of a law requiring employers to grant benefits to same-sex partners. In May 2010, Catholics United criticized a Boston-area Catholic school's decision to deny admission to the child of a lesbian couple.

Catholics United has aimed criticism at the Church for its opposition to same-sex marriage.

In 2012 the organization received most of its operational budget that year from an LGBT rights activist foundation run by influential multi-millionaire Tim Gill.

== Political affiliations ==
John Podesta's leaked emails show Sandy Newman and Podesta exchanging views and strategies with the aim of fomenting "progressive" value change in the Catholic Church.

Sandy Newman, president and founder of the Voices for Progress, wrote in an email to John Podesta: "I have not thought at all about how one would 'plant the seeds of the revolution,' or who would plant them." Podesta agreed that this was necessary, and noted he helped begin two groups to do as Newman suggests Podesta wrote back to note that they had created groups like Catholics in Alliance for the Common Good and Catholics United to push for a more progressive approach to the faith, change would "have to be bottom up."

Raymond Arroyo responded to the much-publicized Podesta e-mails, that he thought; "It makes it seem like you're creating organizations to change the core beliefs of the church," he said. "For someone to come and say, 'I have a political organization to change your church to complete my political agenda or advance my agenda,' I don't know how anybody could embrace that."

Professor Robert P. George says that "these groups are political operations constructed to masquerade as organizations devoted to the Catholic faith."

=== 2008 ===
Catholics United played an active role in shaping the religion and politics debate around the 2008 U.S. presidential election. In 2009, President George W. Bush's former Catholic advisor Deal Hudson told U.S. News & World Report that Catholics United and its allies "made a big difference" in the election.

=== 2010 ===
In July 2010, Catholics United announced a $500,000 campaign supporting Catholic Democratic U.S. Representatives John Boccieri, Kathy Dahlkemper, Steve Driehaus, and Tom Perriello in their unsuccessful reelection bids.

== See also ==
- Progressive Christianity
- Social justice
- Catholics for Choice
- Cafeteria Catholicism
- Courage International
- Ex-gay
- Homosexuality and Roman Catholicism
- Homosexuals Anonymous
- Joel 2:25 International
- Ministry to Persons with a Homosexual Inclination
- On the Pastoral Care of Homosexual Persons
- Restored Hope Network
