= Courage International =

Apostolate of the Roman Catholic Church

- Courage, a Roman Catholic apostolate
- Founded: 1980
- Founder: John Harvey
- Type: 501(c)(3) nonprofit
- Purpose: "To assist men and women with same-sex attractions in living chaste lives in fellowship, truth and love"
- Headquarters: Norwalk, Connecticut, U.S.
- Website: www.couragerc.org

Courage International, also known as Courage Apostolate and Courage for short, is an approved apostolate of the Catholic Church that counsels "men and women with same-sex attractions in living chaste lives in fellowship, truth and love". It claims to not practice so-called conversion therapy but instead follows a treatment model for drug and alcohol addictions used in programs like Alcoholics Anonymous (AA). Courage runs a peer support program aimed at helping gay people remain abstinent from same-sex sexual activity.

The organization runs support groups led by a priest to encourage its members to abstain from acting on their homosexual desires and to live according to the teachings of the Catholic Church on homosexuality. Courage also has a ministry geared towards the relatives and friends of gay people called Encourage.

Its approach has been criticized from dissident Catholics who argue that the organization promotes "mandatory celibacy for gays and lesbians". Courage has also received criticism from LGBT advocacy groups, such as New Ways Ministry, which say that Courage's methods are "problematic and very dangerous to people's spiritual health". In 2015, the Southern Poverty Law Center listed Courage International as one of the ten most prominent "ex-gay" anti-LGBT organizations.

== History ==
In the 25 years prior to creating Courage, John F. Harvey researched and wrote on homosexuality. His first article in 1955, Homosexuality as a Pastoral Problem, argued that homosexuality was caused by overbearing mothers and weak fathers, and that gay men should not marry women but lesbians "could render the marriage debt faithfully, bring children into the world, and fulfill at least the essential duties of wife and mother and homemaker". By 1969 he began arguing that lesbians should also be discouraged from heterosexual marriages. In 1973, when homosexuality was removed from the DSM by the American Psychological Association, he argued Catholic moralists should continue "to teach the immorality of homosexual acts" and encourage homosexuals to be chaste.

Starting in 1978, he led retreats for same-sex attracted Catholic priests and men. In 1979, he proposed a homosexuals anonymous like program, drawing on the 14 step program by Homosexuals Anonymous. The first meeting of Courage was held in September 1980 at St. Joseph Church in New York City including only Harvey and 5 other male participants.

In 1986, the Vatican's Congregation for the Doctrine of the Faith (CDF) issued On the Pastoral Care of Homosexual Persons which was protested by pro-gay Catholics. A year later Harvey published The Homosexual Person: New Thinking in Pastoral Care which opened by defending the CDF statement. He compared his approach with the protestant ex-gay organizations, stating "The Protestant support systems and Courage agree that homosexual acts are always immoral" but that while the Protestants supported chastity for homosexuals as a step towards heterosexuality, he supported chastity as the end goal.

In 1987, Courage had 7 chapters across North America. In the late 1980s it grew to one of the largest organizations that promote chastity to people with same-sex attraction in the world and has continued to operate into the 2020s while other similar groups disbanded.

In 2016, Courage priest Paul Scalia, son of the late U.S. Supreme Court Justice Antonin Scalia, said "Gender ideology" was "demonic" and that "It doesn't mean that those who endorse [it] are demonic or possessed [...] rather, that the reasoning and results of that philosophy [...] line up with the desires, tactics, and resentments of 'Old Scratch' himself".

Pope Leo XIV meet representatives of Courage International, in 6 February 2026. The group said on the occasion: “The opportunity to share with the Holy Father the works of the apostolate, to provide pastoral accompaniment to persons who experience same-sex attraction but who strive to live chaste lives or to accompany family members who have a loved one who identifies as LGBTQ, was a momentous occasion".

== Organization and practices ==
Courage is officially recognized by the Church hierarchy, and was endorsed by the Roman Curia. It is financially supported by the Archdiocese of New York and the Archdiocese of Bridgeport, Connecticut, as well as donations. Individual chapters are self-supporting and exist with the permission of their diocesan bishop. The United States Conference of Catholic Bishops (USCCB) recommended Courage as a ministry to gay Catholics in their 2006 publication, Ministry to Persons with a Homosexual Inclination.

There are chapters in many U.S. cities and several foreign countries. According to the Catholic News Agency, "Courage has a presence in about half of the Catholic dioceses of the United States" as of 2013.

Founder John Harvey viewed homosexuality as pathological and the EWTN Catholic television website had an early history of the group stating that homosexuality is disordered and sexual orientation can be changed, which contradicts the official positions of the main American professional associations, such as American Psychiatric Association, the American Psychological Association, the American Academy of Pediatrics, the American Counseling Association, and the National Association of Social Workers, among others, which have all stated that homosexuality is not a disorder and cannot be changed.

Joseph Nicolosi, the founder of the conversion therapy group the National Association for Research & Therapy of Homosexuality (NARTH), often visited Courage's events and Harvey made use of NARTH, which would refer people to a therapist and a priest.

Courage's leaders claim they do not practice conversion therapy and instead offer counseling based on the 12-step program for addictions treatment developed by Alcoholics Anonymous (AA).

== Criticism from LGBT advocacy groups ==
Courage has faced criticism over the years in its approach from Catholics who disagree with Church teachings on homosexuality and argue that the organization promotes "mandatory celibacy for gays and lesbians".

Hostility has at times broken out between the groups working with these communities. Harvey has set Courage in opposition to DignityUSA and has publicly criticised New Ways Ministry on a number of occasions. Both DignityUSA and New Ways Ministry have suggested that having a lesbian or gay identity is a blessing from God, and that Courage is being "anti-pastoral" in its work. Dignity and NWM have called for a stronger attempt at reconciliation with gay Catholics and recognition that stable same-sex relationships may be a good thing.

The leaders of New Ways Ministry, Jeannine Gramick, SL, and Fr. Robert Nugent do not recommend Courage to Catholics, because they fundamentally disagree with its approach, particularly because its founder John Harvey insisted that homosexuality was an illness or disorder. The executive director of DignityUSA said in 2014 that "Courage is really problematic and very dangerous to people’s spiritual health. And we have been very concerned about it for a lot of years".

The Southern Poverty Law Center included a description of Courage International in a report on the ten most prominent ex-gay, anti-LGBT groups in 2015, and the National LGBTQ Task Force wrote in a report that the "ex-gay industry" was "re-framing its attack on homosexuality in kinder, gentler terms" in a way that undermines progress towards LGBT rights.

In France, three organizations wrote a letter to a local mayor's office in August 2016 to denounce meetings that had been held by Courage International in a municipal building. They objected to Courage's view that individuals who identify as LGBT are "wounded people" and its claims to offer a "perfect path towards chastity" using AA's 12-step model, which they viewed as "homophobic, humiliating, and discriminatory". The joint letter was written by the Human Rights League (Ligue des droits de l'homme), Rainbow Chalon-sur-Saône, and Secular Solidarity 71 (Solidarité Laïque 71).

== See also ==
- Catholics United
- Ex-Ex-Gay
- GLAAD
- Homophobia
- Homosexuality and Roman Catholicism
- Jews Offering New Alternatives to Homosexuality (JONAH)
- Matthew Shepard Foundation
- North Star (organization)
- The Trevor Project
- True Freedom Trust
