= Ministry to Persons with a Homosexual Inclination =

Ministry to Persons with a Homosexual Inclination is a document that was issued on November 14, 2006, by the United States Conference of Catholic Bishops. It details guidelines on Catholic religious ministry to gay and lesbian people in the United States.

== Description ==
The document emphasizes that same-sex sexual activity is morally wrong or sinful, stating that "under no circumstances can they (homosexual acts) be approved".

The document further states:

- "While the Church teaches that homosexual acts are immoral, she does distinguish between engaging in homosexual acts and having a homosexual inclination. While the former is always objectively sinful, the latter is not."
- "Simply possessing such inclinations does not constitute a sin, at least to the extent that they are beyond one’s control. Acting on such inclinations, however, is always wrong."
- "It is crucially important to understand that saying a person has a particular inclination that is disordered is not to say that the person as a whole is disordered. Nor does it mean that one has been rejected by God or the Church."
- "All people are created in the image and likeness of God and thus possess an innate human dignity that must be acknowledged and respected."
- "The fact that homosexual acts are immoral may never be used to justify violence or unjust discrimination."
- "It is deplorable that homosexual persons have been and are the object of violent malice in speech or in action. Such treatment deserves condemnation from the Church’s pastors wherever it occurs."

== See also ==
- Catholics United
- Christian views on homosexuality
- Courage International
- DignityUSA
- Ex-gay
- Homosexuality and Roman Catholicism
- Homosexuals Anonymous
- Instruction Concerning the Criteria for the Discernment of Vocations with regard to Persons with Homosexual Tendencies in view of their Admission to the Seminary and to Holy Orders
- Integrity USA, a similar group of organizations for members of the Anglican Communion
- Joel 2:25 International
- LGBT-welcoming church programs
- List of Christian denominational positions on homosexuality
- New Ways Ministry
- On the Pastoral Care of Homosexual Persons
- Ordination of LGBT Christian clergy
- Religion and sexuality
- Restored Hope Network
