= Catholic doctrine =

Catholic doctrine may refer to:

- Catholic theology
  - Catholic moral theology
  - Catholic Mariology
- Heresy in the Catholic Church
- Catholic social teaching
- Catholic liturgy
- Catholic Church and homosexuality
- Catholic theology of sexuality
- Ten Commandments in Catholic theology
