= Rainbow Sash Movement =

LGBTQ Catholic organisation

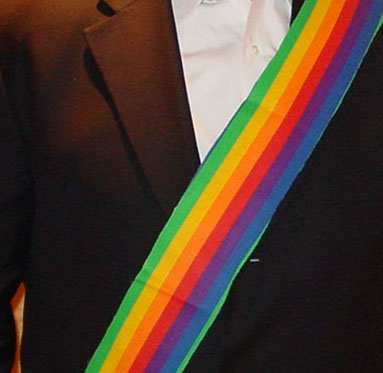
Sash worn by the members of the organisation

The Rainbow Sash Movement is an organisation of gay, lesbian, bisexual, and transgender Catholics, with their families and friends, who are publicly calling the Catholic Church to a "conversion of heart around issues of human sexuality".

== History in Australia ==
The Movement was established in 1998 in Melbourne, Australia in response to the refusal of London's Cardinal Basil Hume, and Melbourne's Archbishop George Pell and New York's Cardinal John O'Connor, to provide communion to two openly gay Catholic men, one a priest, in 1997.

On Pentecost Sunday 31 May 1998 a group of 70 people attended Mass in St Patrick's Cathedral, Melbourne, wearing a Rainbow Sash.

The movement acted again on Pentecost Sunday in 2002.

== History in the United States ==
The Rainbow Sash Movement was taken up in US in 2000, with Melbourne-based Michael B. Kelly as the group's international spokesperson. The movement is largely based out of Chicago, Illinois.

The movement acted on Pentecost Sunday in 2001-2007, and 2010. In 2012 the movement criticized the Knights of Columbus for supporting and funding homophobic messaging and campaigns. The organization also acted in October 2010 in Collegeville, Minnesota, and in October 2013 in Springfield, Illinois.

As of 2023, the movement is still ongoing.

== History in England ==
English Catholics have also taken part in the movement since the late 1997. The movement was ongoing as of 2010.

== Activity ==
The Rainbow Sash itself is a strip of a rainbow-colored fabric which is worn over the left shoulder and is put on at the beginning of the Liturgy. The members go up to receive Eucharist. If denied, they go back to pews and remain standing, but if the Eucharist is received then they go back to the pew and kneel in the traditional way.

Pentecost Sunday was chosen because the day is "a celebration of God's gifts", including the gift of sexuality. The sash is meant to serve as an act of celebration rather than an act of protest.

== See also ==
- Homosexuality and Roman Catholicism
- LGBT-affirming Christian denominations
