= DignityUSA =

American political organization

- Formation: 1969; 57 years ago
- Founder: Patrick Nidorf
- Founded at: San Diego, California, US
- Headquarters: Boston, Massachusetts, US
- Website: www.dignityusa.org

DignityUSA is an organization with headquarters in Boston, Massachusetts, that focuses on LGBT rights and the Catholic Church. Dignity Canada exists as the Canadian sister organization. The organization is made up of local chapters across the country, and affinity caucuses, such as "Aging with Dignity," "Women of Dignity," "Transgender," "Young Adults," etc. The organization functions both as a support and social group for LGBT and LGBT-accepting Catholics to worship together. "The goal of 'Dignity' is to serve as an advocate for change in the Roman Catholic Church's stance on homosexuality", and as an activist group for LGBT rights and education about LGBT issues.

Since 2007, Marianne Duddy-Burke has served as executive director.

== History ==
Dignity was founded in early 1969 in San Diego, California, by Father Patrick Nidorf, first as a counseling group, then as a support group. That makes it a "pre-Stonewall" LGBT organization that is still in existence. The first chapter of Dignity formed in 1970 in Los Angeles.

In 1982, lesbian members of Dignity founded the Conference for Catholic Lesbians, out of concern that Dignity was too oriented toward males.

DignityUSA has been recognized by the US Internal Revenue Service as a 501(c)(3) nonprofit organization since August 1982.

After its founding in 1969, authorities within the Catholic Church did not view Dignity as a Catholic organization and subsequently called on Nidorf to step down from his position. Dignity then decided to continue on as a lay-led organization. For the organization, this was a big turning point: “[The] choice helped shape Dignity into what it is today”. In 1975, the Congregation for the Doctrine of the Faith published a writing stating concern over any changing of socially exempted gender or sexuality norms. It stated that, “In Sacred Scripture, they are condemned as a serious depravity and even condemned as the sad consequence of rejecting God.”

=== On the Pastoral Care of Homosexual Persons ===
On October 1, 1986, the Congregation for the Doctrine of the Faith, the Catholic body charged to "spread sound Catholic doctrine and defend those points of Christian tradition which seem in danger because of new and unacceptable doctrines", issued a letter entitled On the Pastoral Care of Homosexual Persons. The document indicated that support should be withdrawn from any organization that was neglectful of Church teaching.

During the AIDS crisis, Dignity took a large role in supporting those with AIDS and their families. Many did not even know their loved ones were gay at the time, “We were often with families as they learned their son was gay and did not have long to live, or worse, had died too ashamed or fearful to share these secrets with them.” The organization worked hard to provide care, companionship, spiritual support, cleaning services, nourishment, and funerals for many people with AIDS during a time when so many were dying.

According to writer Neil Miller, an immediate effect of the document was the decision by several American bishops to order that DignityUSA no longer be allowed to hold Mass in Catholic churches. Dioceses in Atlanta, Minneapolis, Buffalo, Brooklyn, Pensacola, Vancouver, Washington, D.C., and New York City all rescinded permission for the organization to hold services on church property. In some cases the group chapters had been holding Masses for a decade or longer.

== Honors ==
DignityUSA was given Call To Action's 1994 Leadership Award.

Dignity Chicago was inducted into the Chicago Gay and Lesbian Hall of Fame in 1997.

In 2023, San Francisco Mayor London Breed declared January 15 Dignity/San Francisco Day during the year of Dignity/San Francisco's fiftieth anniversary.

== Chapters ==
As of 2026, there are 28 chapters in the United States. During the COVID-19 pandemic, there were 17 offering online services.

== See also ==
- Catholics United
- Homosexuality and Catholicism
- Integrity USA, Anglican Communion
- LGBT-welcoming church programs
- Ministry to Persons with a Homosexual Inclination
- New Ways Ministry
