= New Ways Ministry =

Ministry of advocacy for LGBT Catholics

- Formation: 1977
- Headquarters: Maryland
- Founder: Jeannie Gramick

New Ways Ministry is a ministry of advocacy and justice for lesbian, gay, bisexual, and transgender Catholics. The national organization is primarily based in the state of Maryland. It was one of the earliest groups attempting to alter the way Catholics have traditionally dealt with LGBT issues, and was established by Sister Jeannine Gramick and Father Robert Nugent.

== History ==
New Ways Ministry was founded in 1977 by Sr. Jeannine Gramick, a Catholic religious sister, and Fr. Robert Nugent, a Catholic priest. The ministry expanded their existing work of writing and speaking on homosexuality in the years following 1971, with the aim of creating acceptance for gay and lesbian Catholics within the Roman Catholic Church.

It adopted its name from the pastoral letter of Bishop Francis Mugavero of the Diocese of Brooklyn, "Sexuality: God's Gift". Written in 1976, the letter addressed gay and lesbian Catholics, as well as the widowed, adolescents, the divorced, and those having sexual relations outside of marriage, stating: " ...we pledge our willingness to help you ...to try to find new ways to communicate the truth of Christ because we believe it will make you free." These sentiments inspired the pastoral efforts by the co-founders to build bridges between differing constituencies in Catholicism.

In 1977, Nugent founded New Ways Ministry with Gramick. "We knew it was risky," he told the St. Petersburg Times in 1999, "because Catholics weren't talking and writing about sexuality."

Nugent served as a consultant for the U.S. Conference of Catholic Bishops on its 1997 pastoral document on homosexuality, "Always Our Children."

== Mission and work ==
New Ways Ministry advocates for acceptance of LGBT people among Catholics and among the general population. In the belief that homophobia and transphobia stem from a lack of understanding, New Ways Ministry focuses on educating families, churches, and communities through dialogue, publications and research, and educational programming. Publications have included responses to Vatican Instructions, "Homosexuality: A Positive Catholic Perspective" and "Marriage Equality: A Positive Catholic Approach," and symposia on the issue of homosexuality in the Catholic church have hosted speakers including Bishop Thomas Gumbleton of the Archdiocese of Detroit and Bishop Matthew Clark of the Diocese of Rochester. They also organize Catholics nationally in support of marriage equality initiatives.

=== Partnerships ===
New Ways Ministry partners with the Global Network of Rainbow Catholics.

== Criticism ==
In 1984, Cardinal James Hickey barred the organization from the Archdiocese of Washington because of its dissent from traditional Catholic teaching on the issue of homosexuality, which condemns sexual activity between people of the same gender. The same year, the Vatican ordered co-founders Nugent and Gramick to resign from New Ways Ministry. Both continued publishing, speaking, and ministering around gay and lesbian issues within the Catholic Church until 1999.

That year, the Congregation for the Doctrine of the Faith, then under the leadership of Cardinal Joseph Ratzinger, condemned the organization’s positions on homosexuality, and ordered co-founders Gramick and Nugent to cease pastoral ministry within the gay and lesbian community. Fr. Nugent returned to parish-based ministry, but Sr. Gramick refused to comply. While he stepped back from public ministry, Nugent continued to counsel gay and lesbian Catholics privately, and advised theologians and scholars working on issues of homosexuality. He also wrote of Pierre Teilhard de Chardin and Thomas Merton.

In 2010, Cardinal Francis George, Archbishop of Chicago and President of the United States Conference of Catholic Bishops (USCCB), stated New Ways did not present an authentic view of Catholic teaching. Instead, he insisted that it "confuses the faithful about the Church’s efforts to defend traditional marriage and to minister to homosexual persons". In March 2011, the USCCB affirmed Cardinal George's statement and reiterated "...that in no manner is the position proposed by New Ways Ministry in conformity with Catholic teaching and in no manner is this organization authorized to speak on behalf of the Catholic Church or to identify itself as a Catholic organization."

== Nugent's death ==
Nugent retired in June 2013 and died of lung cancer at the age of 76 on January 1, 2014 in Milwaukee, Wisconsin. Some of Nugent's papers are in the Special Collections of Marquette University.

== Pope Francis ==
In 2015, Sr. Gramick was one of 50 New Ways LGBT members who were given front row seating at a Wednesday papal audience in St. Peter’s Square, Rome.

In 2021, Pope Francis addressed two letters to New Ways Ministry, in which he commended the organization for its outreach to the LGBTQ community and referred to Sr. Jeannine Gramick as "a valiant woman" who had suffered much for her ministry. He also said he is aware that New Ways Ministry's "history has not been an easy one," but that loving one's neighbor is still the second commandment, tied "necessarily" to the first commandment to love God, while thanking them for "their neighborly work".

In October of 2023, Pope Francis received Sr. Gramick and three other staff from New Ways Ministry in the Vatican. The meeting was held in Pope's residence; Sr. Gramick stated the meeting was emotional, thanking Pope Francis for his allowance for blessing of same-sex couples, and opposition to LGBTQ+ criminalization laws.

== See also ==
- Outreach Catholic
- LGBT-welcoming church programs
- DignityUSA
- Mary Hunt
- Donna Quinn
- Homosexuality and Roman Catholicism
- Courage International
- Joel 2:25 International
- Ministry to Persons with a Homosexual Inclination
- On the Pastoral Care of Homosexual Persons
- Dissent from Catholic teaching on homosexuality
