= Catholic Church and homosexuality =

The relationship between the Catholic Church and homosexuality is complex and often contentious, involving various conflicting views between the Roman Catholic Church and some within the LGBTQ community.

According to Catholic doctrine, solely having same-sex attractions itself is not considered inherently sinful; it is the act of engaging in sexual activity with someone of the same sex that is regarded as a grave mortal sin against chastity. The Church also does not recognize nor perform any sacramental marriages between same-sex couples. However, the Catechism of the Catholic Church emphasizes that all homosexual individuals must "be accepted and treated with respect, compassion, and sensitivity," and that all forms of unjust discrimination should be discouraged and avoided at all cost.

The Church's teachings on this issue have developed over time, influenced by papal interventions and theologians, including the early Church Fathers. Pastoral care for LGBTQ Catholics is provided through a variety of official and unofficial channels, varying from diocese to diocese. In recent years, senior clergy and popes have called for the church to increase its support for LGBTQ individuals.

The Catholic Church is politically active on LGBTQ issues and its relationship with the LGBTQ community has been particularly strained during critical moments, such as the height of the HIV/AIDS pandemic. Some notable LGBT Catholics, including priests and bishops, have been openly gay or bisexual. Catholic dissenters have argued that legally consensual relations between people of the same-sex is as inherently spiritual and valuable as the same for those of the opposite-sex. Invariably, some Catholic organizations and institutions that uphold church teachings on sexual activities campaigned against LGBTQ rights worldwide, advocating for the promotion and encouragement of chastity and celibacy among LGBT Catholics.

Pope Francis took a notably different approach to these subjects than that of his predecessors. He became the first Pope to support granting civil union status for same-sex individuals as a legal protection for same-sex domestic partners. He also publicly denounced sodomy laws.

== Catholic doctrine ==
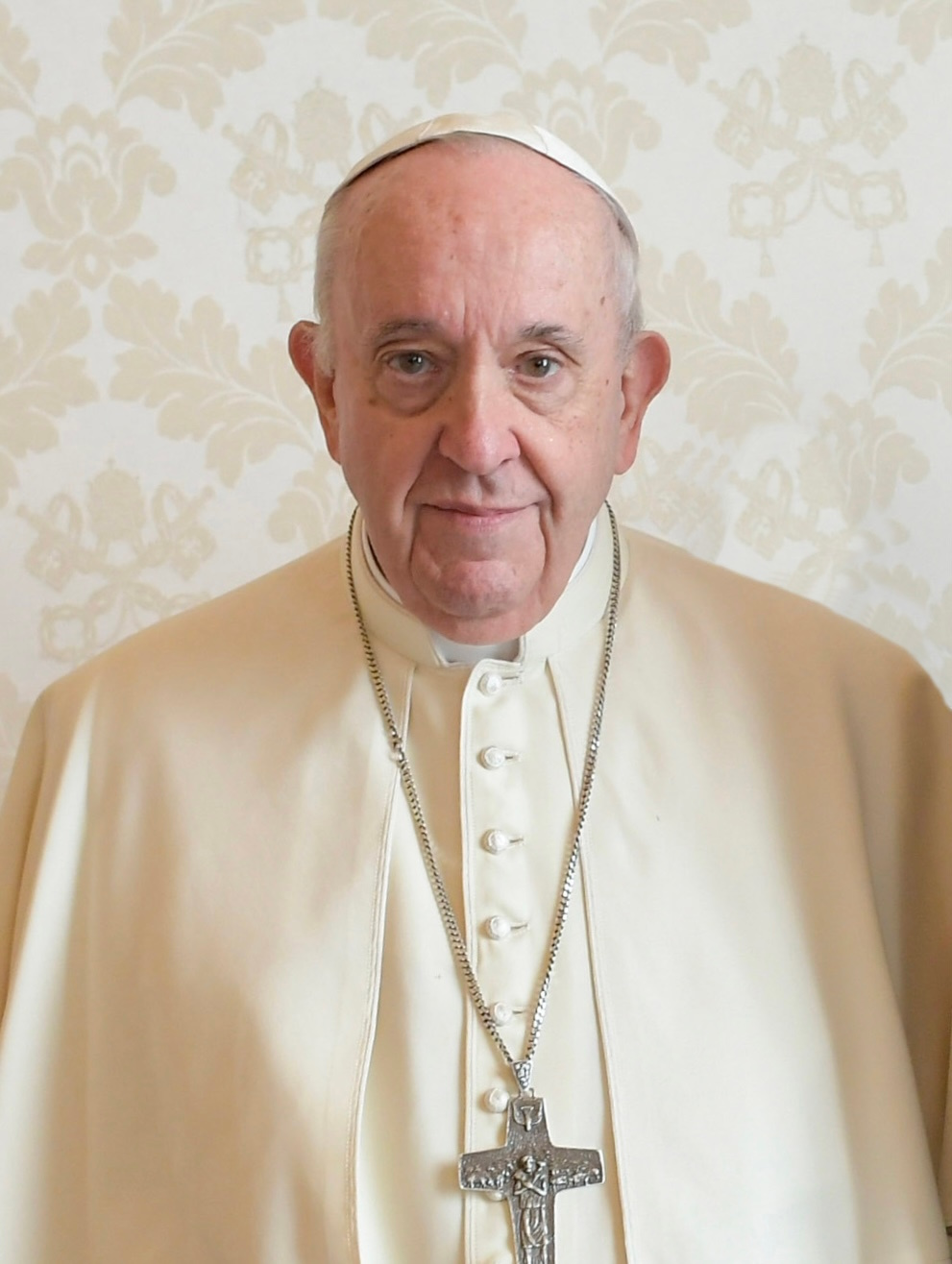
Pope Francis who notably engaged with various LGBT persons during his Pontificate

The Catholic Church teaches that, as a person does not choose to be either homosexual or heterosexual, subjectively experiencing attraction for (a) person(s) of one's own sex is not inherently sinful. According to the Catholic theology of sexuality, all sexual acts must be open to procreation by nature and express the symbolism of male-female complementarity. Sexual acts between two members of the same sex cannot meet these standards. Homosexuality thus constitutes a tendency towards this sin. The church teaches that gay persons are called to practice chastity.

The church also teaches that gay people "must be accepted with respect, compassion, and sensitivity", and that "every sign of unjust discrimination in their regard should be avoided." (Note: See also On the Pastoral Care of Homosexual Persons, paragraph 11.) while holding that discrimination in marriage, employment, housing, and adoption in some circumstances can be just and "obligatory." According to the Compendium of the Catechism of the Catholic Church, "homosexual acts" are "grave sins against chastity" and "expressions of the vice of lust." Homosexual acts are included among the grave sins against chastity in the Catechism of the Catholic Church, along with masturbation, fornication, and pornography.

According to the Catechism, "homosexual acts" (i.e., sexual acts between persons of the same sex) are "acts of grave depravity" that are "intrinsically disordered." It continues, "They are contrary to the natural law. They close the sexual act to the gift of life. They do not proceed from a genuine affective and sexual complementarity. Under no circumstances can they be approved." Regarding homosexuality as an orientation, the Catechism describes it as "objectively disordered."

The church points to several passages in the Bible as the basis for its teachings, including Genesis 19:1–11, Leviticus 18:22 and 20:13, I Corinthians 6:9, Romans 1:18–32, and I Timothy 1:10. In December 2019, the Pontifical Biblical Commission published a book that included an exegesis on these and other passages.

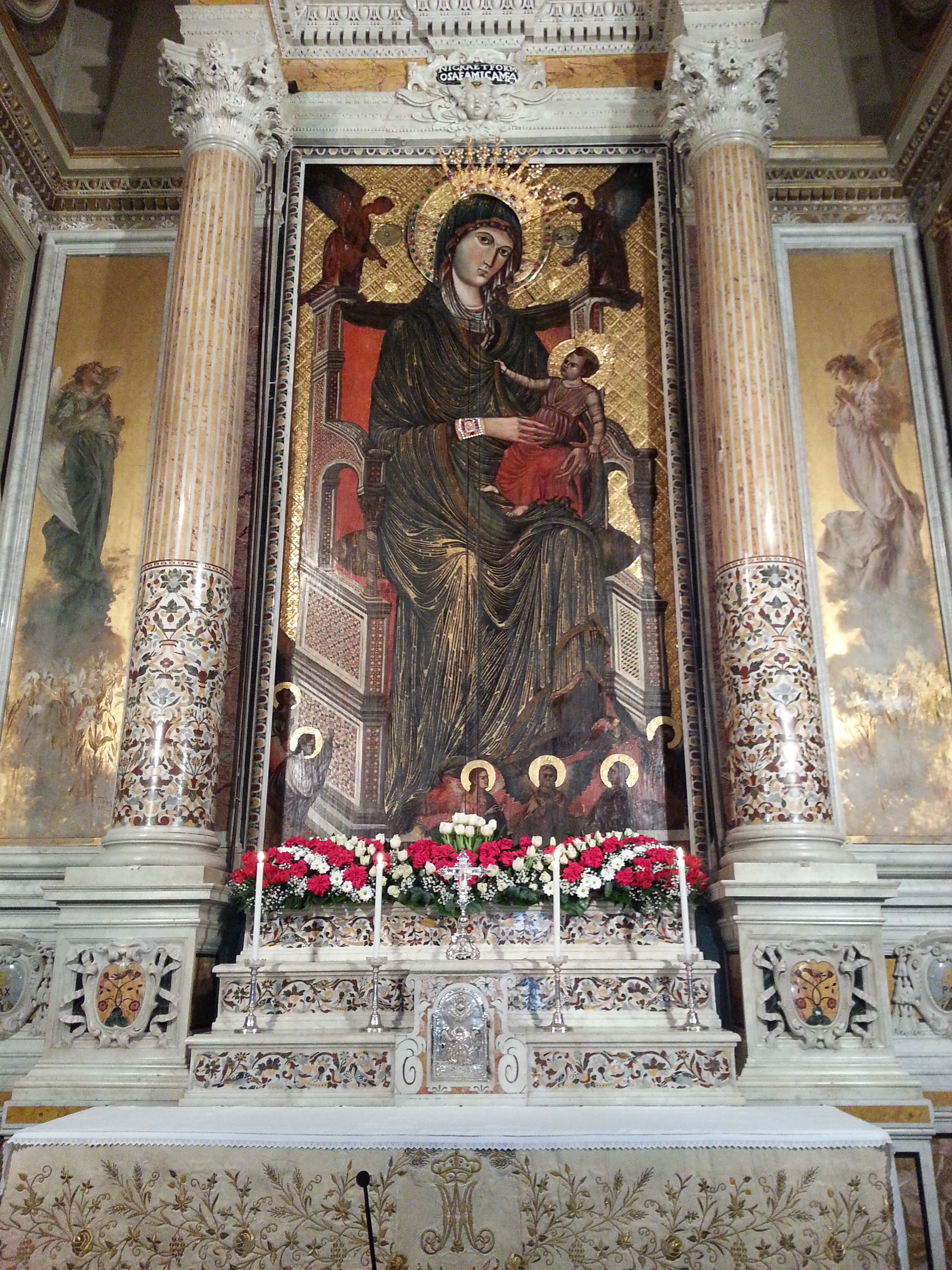
The Madonna and Child of Montevergine, with a longstanding pious tradition and association with gay couples since 1256

Research conducted in the fields of social sciences and study of religion indicates that the Catholic Church's teachings on sexuality are "a major source of conflict and distress" to LGBT Catholics.

Accordingly, pious tradition claims that the Blessed Virgin Mary in Montevergine in Avellino, Italy has always been associated with homosexual Catholics, owing a tradition where a gay couple was saved from death by a purported miracle in 1256. To date, the same association and patronage is upheld by its gay devotees who venerate the Virgin Mary within that locality under that specific Marian title. Other notable Marian shrines with a comparable LGBT pious associations are the "Virgin of Hope" of Triana, Seville in Spain, the Basilica of the Virgin of Consolation in Turin and the Baclaran Church in Manila, Philippines.

== Same-sex marriage ==
The church opposes same-sex marriage and is active in political campaigns against it. It also opposes same-sex civil unions and does not bless them, although some priests and bishops have offered blessings for same-sex couples or spoken in favor of priests being able to bless them. Nevertheless, Pope Francis expressed support for civil-unions to protect gay couples in the documentary Francesco (2020), and in a press conference in September 2021. In that press conference, Pope Francis declared:

If a homosexual couple wants to lead a life together, the State has the possibility to give them safety, stability, inheritance; and not only to homosexuals but to all the people who want to live together. But marriage is a sacrament, between a man and a woman.

In March 2021, the Congregation for the Doctrine of the Faith said that the church cannot bless same-sex relationships because "God cannot bless sin". On 18 December 2023, it published Fiducia supplicans, a declaration allowing Catholic priests to bless persons who are not considered to be married by the church, such as those in irregular relations, divorced and including same-sex couples.

== Benediction for same-sex couples ==
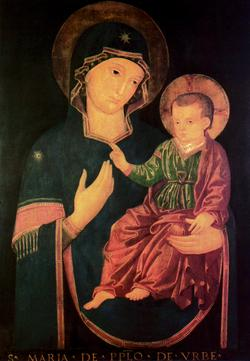
The venerated image of Augustina Domina Taurinorum (English: Noble Mistress of Turin) enshrined at the Basilica of the Virgin of Consolation in Turin, known for its specialized LGBT ministry endorsed by Pope Francis in 2017

In March 2021, the Congregation for the Doctrine of the Faith said that the church cannot bless same-sex relationships because "God cannot bless Sin". On 25 September 2023, in a responsum to conservative cardinals before the 16th World Synod of Bishops, Francis signalled the church's openness to blessings for gay couples as long as they did not misrepresent the Catholic view of marriage as between one man and one woman.

On 18 December 2023, the Dicastery for the Doctrine of the Faith published Fiducia supplicans, a declaration allowing Catholic priests to bless people who are not considered to be married by the church, including people in same-sex relationships. These were to be "short and simple pastoral blessings (neither liturgical nor ritualized) of couples in irregular situations (but not of their unions)". The declaration does not permit the blessing of the same-sex relationships, only the people within it.

While the declaration was welcomed by many Catholics, it also sparked considerable controversy and criticism, with several bishops' conferences barring the blessings in their jurisdictions or asking priests to refrain from them.

- In January 2024, the Roman-Catholic bishop conference in France allowed blessing ceremonies for same-sex partnerships.
- In January 2024, the Episcopal Conference of Italy supported blessing ceremonies for same-sex couples.
- In January 2024, Roman-Catholic bishop conference in Portugal supported blessing ceremonies for same-sex couples.
- In April 2025, Roman Catholic Bishop Conference in Germany published a guideline help document of blessing ceremonies for same-sex couples.

== History ==
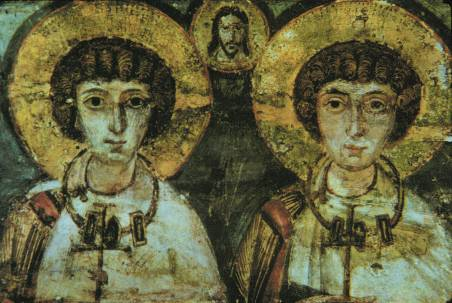
Christian saints Sergius and Bacchus, paired soldier martyrs purported to be a couple, later adopted by the LGBT Catholics as religious inspiration due to their effeminate manner of torture and persecution. Circa 7th century. Oil on tempera, the Chanenko Museum in Kyiv, Ukraine

The Christian tradition has generally prohibited all sexual activities outside of married sexual intercourse. This prohibition includes activities engaged in by couples or individuals of either the same or different sexes. The Catholic Church's position specifically on homosexuality developed from the teachings of the Church Fathers, which was in stark contrast to Greek and Roman attitudes towards same-sex relations, including pederasty.

Canon law regarding same-sex sexual activity has been shaped through the decrees issued by a series of ecclesiastical councils. Initially, canons against sodomy were aimed at ensuring clerical or monastic discipline, and were only widened in the medieval period to include laymen.

In the Summa Theologica, Saint Thomas Aquinas maintained that homosexual practice was contrary to natural law, arguing that the primary natural end of the sexual act was procreation, and since said procreation is carried out from a process of sexual fertilization between a man and a woman, homosexuality is contrary to the very end of said act. He also stated that "the unnatural vice" is the greatest of the sins of lust. Throughout the Middle Ages, the church repeatedly condemned homosexuality, and often collaborated with civic authorities to punish people engaging in same-sex relations. Punishment of sexual "vice" as well as religious heresy was seen as strengthening the church's moral authority.

== After the Second Vatican Council ==
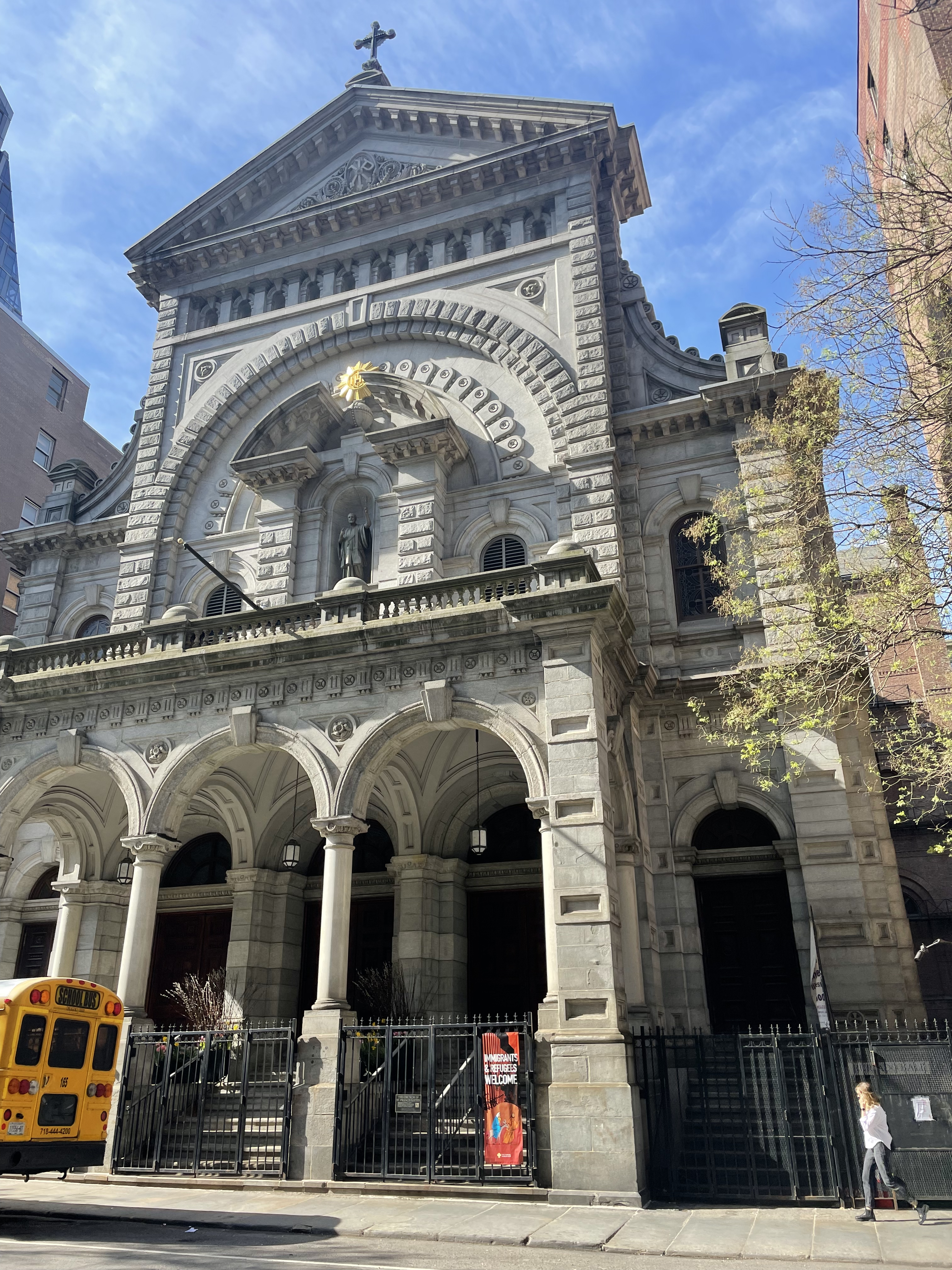
The Church of Saint Francis Xavier in New York, known for its outspoken LGBT activism in the United States

In the late 20th century, the church has responded to gay rights movements by reiterating its condemnation of homosexuality while acknowledging the existence of gay people. In January 1976, the Congregation of the Doctrine of the Faith under Pope Paul VI published Persona Humana, which codified the teaching against all extra-marital sex, including gay sex. The document stated that acceptance of homosexual activity runs counter to the church's teaching and morality. It drew a distinction between people who were homosexual because of "a false education," "a bad example" or other causes it described as "not incurable," and a "pathological" condition which was "incurable." However, it criticized those who argued that innate homosexuality justified same-sex sexual activity within loving relationships, and stated that the Bible condemned homosexual activity as depraved, "intrinsically disordered," never to be approved, and a consequence of rejecting God.

Earlier, the controversially liberal 1966 Dutch Catechism, which was the first post-Vatican II Catholic catechism and which had been commissioned by the Dutch bishops, had stated that "The very sharp strictures of Scripture on homosexual practices (Genesis 1; Romans 1) must be read in their context" as condemning a trend for homosexuality among non-gay people, implying that people who were gay were not condemned for homosexual activity.

In October 1986, the Congregation for the Doctrine of the Faith released a letter addressed to all the bishops of the Catholic Church entitled On the Pastoral Care of Homosexual Persons. This was signed by Cardinal Joseph Ratzinger as prefect. The letter gave instructions on how the clergy should deal with, and respond to, lesbian, gay, and bisexual people. Designed to remove any ambiguity about permissible tolerance of homosexual orientation resulting from the earlier Persona Humana—and prompted by the growing influence of gay-accepting groups and clergy—the letter was particularly aimed at the church in the United States. It affirmed the position that while homosexual orientation is not in itself a sin, it is nevertheless a tendency towards the "moral evil" of homosexual activity, and therefore must be considered "an objective disorder", which moreover is "essentially self-indulgent" since homosexual sexual acts are not procreative and therefore not genuinely loving or selfless.

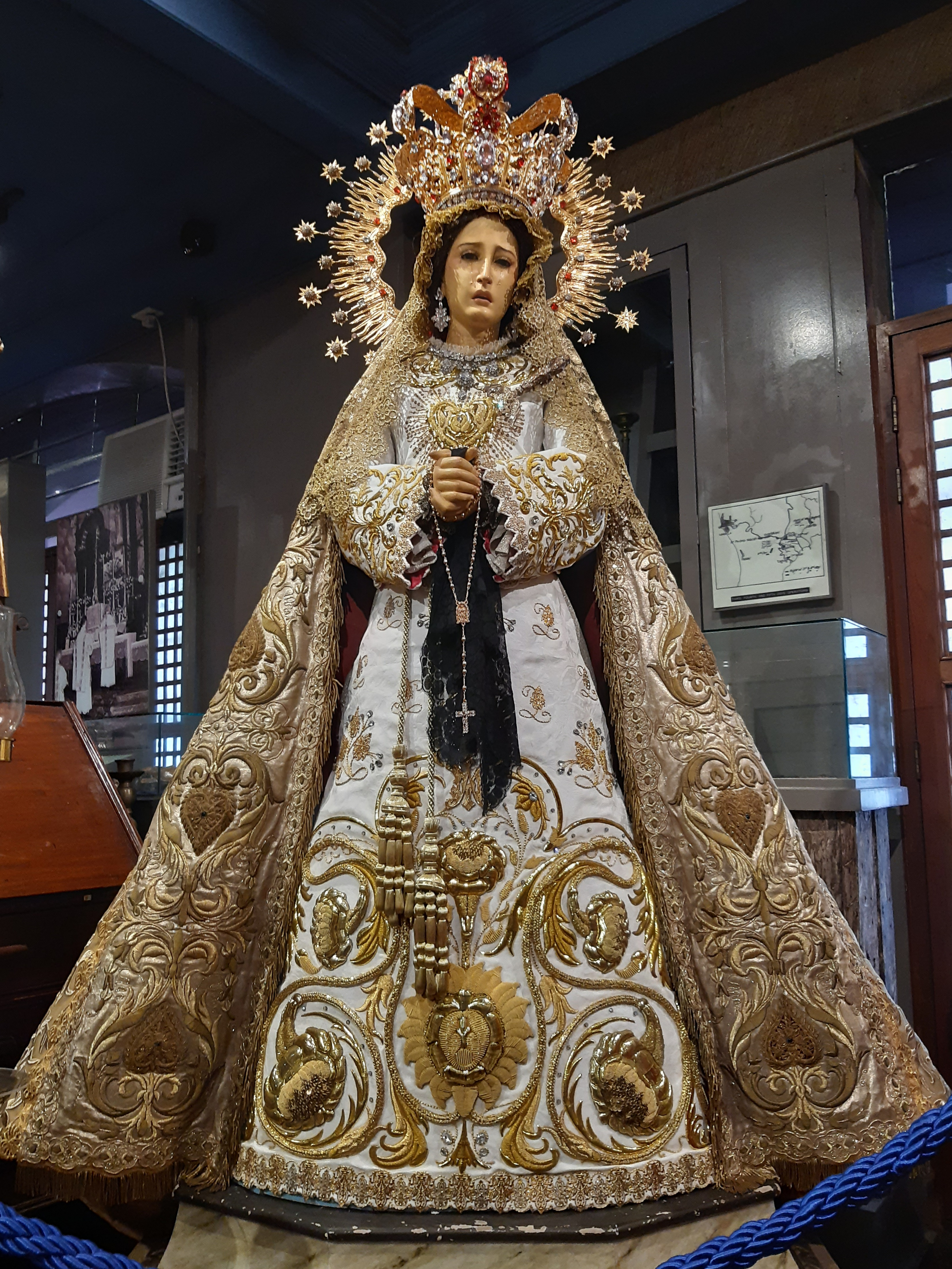
A Marian image of “Mater Dolorosa” (English: Lacrimating Mother) in Pasig City, a notable devotion often associated to LGBT Catholics in the Philippines

The letter also said that accepting homosexual acts as morally equivalent to married heterosexual acts was harmful to the family and society and warned bishops to be on guard against, and not to support, Catholic organizations not upholding the church's doctrine on homosexuality—groups which the letter said were not really Catholic. This alluded to LGBT and LGBT-accepting Catholic groups such as DignityUSA and New Ways Ministry, and ultimately resulted in the exclusion of Dignity from Church property. The letter condemned physical and verbal violence against gay people but reiterated that this did not change its opposition to homosexuality or gay rights. Its claims that accepting and legalizing homosexual behaviour leads to violence ("neither the church nor society at large should be surprised" when anti-gay hate crimes increase in the wake of gay civil rights legislation) were seen as controversially blaming gay people for homophobic violence and encouraging homophobic violence. Referring to the AIDS epidemic, the letter, McNeill writes, blamed AIDS on gay rights activists and gay-accepting mental health professionals: "Even when the practice of homosexuality may seriously threaten the lives and well-being of a large number of people, its advocates remain undeterred and refuse to consider the magnitude of the risks involved".

In a statement released in July 1992, "Some Considerations Concerning the Catholic Response to Legislative Proposals on the Non-Discrimination of Homosexual Persons," the Congregation for the Doctrine of the Faith reiterated its position from "On the Pastoral Care of Homosexual Persons," and further stated that discrimination against gay people in certain areas, such as selecting adoptive or foster parents or in hiring teachers, coaches, or military service members, is not unjust, and thus can be permitted in some circumstances.

On 31 October 2023, a document from the Dicastery for the Doctrine of the Faith, responding to questions from the Bishop of Santo Amaro, Jose Negri declared that transgender people could be baptised, be godparents at a baptism, and be witnesses at weddings, so long as such situations would not cause scandal. Moreover, the responses stated that under the prudence of the priest, a cohabiting "homoaffective" Catholic can be a godparent, being understood that where that person is not merely "cohabiting" but notoriously doing so "more uxorio" (i.e. in a sexual relationship), the situation would be "different". The responses were signed by both Pope Francis and Cardinal Fernández of the Dicastery for the Doctrine of the Faith. The Vatican stated that the document "simply clarified church teaching and did not constitute new policy or a change in policy."

In 2025, a "Pilgrimage of the Tenda di Gionata Association and other associations" (English: "The Tent of Jonathan”) was included in the Vatican's Jubilee Year program, these associations actually being LGBT federations and first time that such an LGBTQ-themed pilgrimage was included in the official calendar and program. Its pilgrims came from Brazil, Italy, and the United States.

== Pastoral care for gay Catholics ==
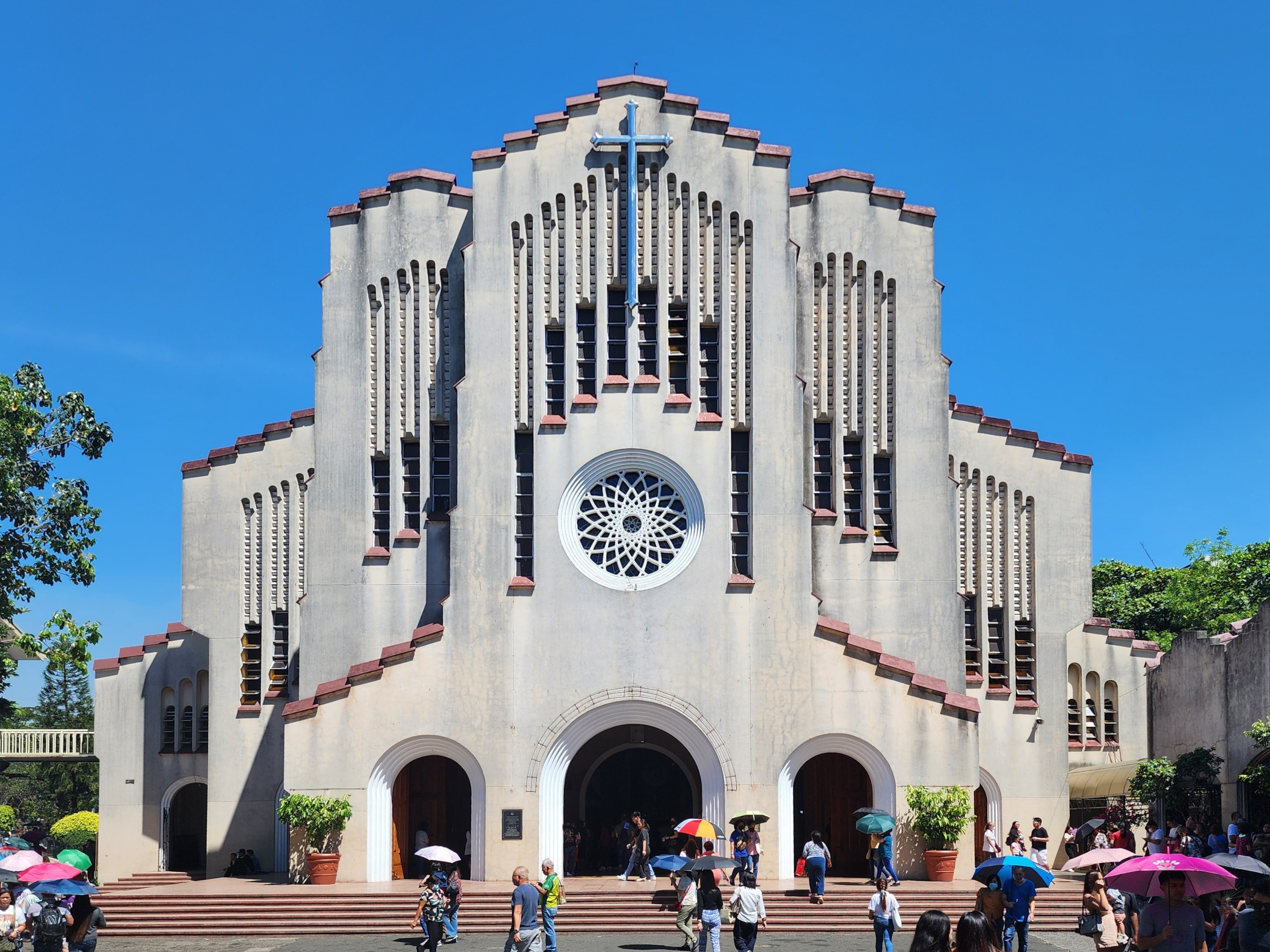
The national Marian shrine known as Baclaran Church (1958) in Manila, Philippines, known for its longstanding association with LGBT Filipino Catholics and the cultural wordplay "Bakla"

Beginning in the 1970s, the United States Conference of Catholic Bishops taught that gay people "should have an active role in the Christian community" and have called on "all Christians and citizens of good will to confront their own fears about homosexuality and to curb the humor and discrimination that offend homosexual persons. We understand that having a homosexual orientation brings with it enough anxiety, pain and issues related to self-acceptance without society bringing additional prejudicial treatment." In 1997, they published a letter entitled Always Our Children, as a pastoral message to parents of gay and bisexual children with guidelines for pastoral ministers. Reiterating the church's opposition to homosexuality, it told parents not to break off contact with a gay or bisexual son or daughter; they should instead look for appropriate counseling both for the child and for themselves. Gay Catholics, the bishops said, should be allowed to participate actively in the Christian community and, if living chastely, hold leadership positions. It also noted "an importance and urgency" to minister to those with AIDS, especially considering the impact it had on the gay community.

Bishops around the world have held diocesan events with the goal of reaching out to gay Catholics and ministering to them, and more have spoken publicly about the need to love and welcome them into the church. Pope John Paul II asked "the bishops to support, with the means at their disposal, the development of appropriate forms of pastoral care for homosexual persons." Several assemblies of the Synod of Bishops have struck similar themes, while maintaining that same-sex sexual activity is sinful and that same-sex marriage cannot be permitted. In 2018, in a move regarded as a sign of respect to the community, the Vatican used the acronym LGBT for the first time in an official document. In several public statements, Francis emphasised the need to accept, welcome, and accompany LGBT people, including LGBT children.

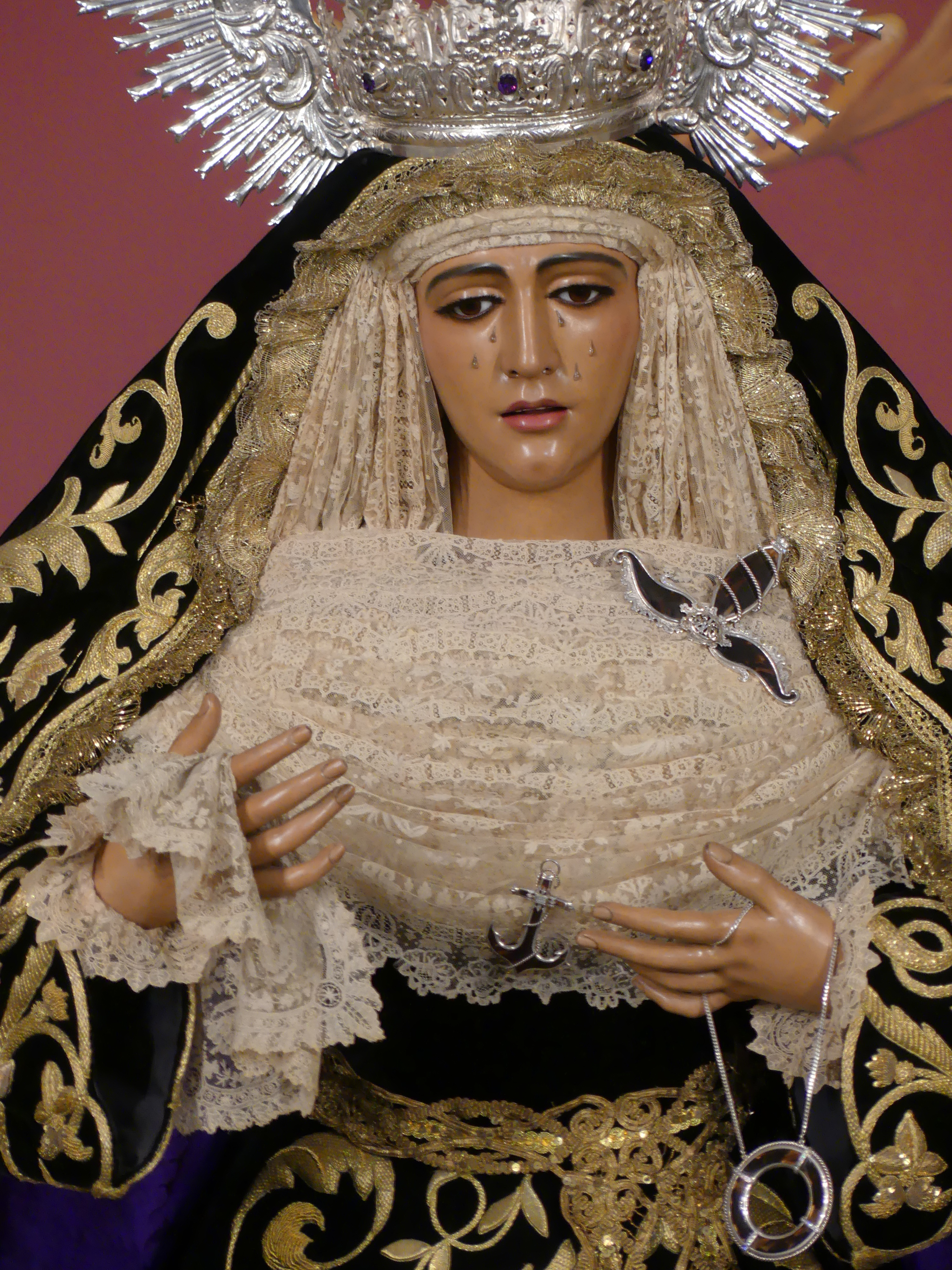
The Pontifically crowned "Holy Virgin of Hope" (1418) enshrined at the "Chapel of the Sailors" in Triana, Seville with a longstanding pious tradition of LGBT devotees in Spain

The 2014 Synod on the Family and Synod on the Family in 2015 concerned themselves in part with "accepting and valuing their [gay Catholics'] sexual orientation" and place in Catholic communities, "without compromising Catholic doctrine on the family and matrimony." The reports of the synods were noted for their unusually mild language towards gay people, such as the lack of use of phrases such as "intrinsically disordered." They also reiterated the church's opposition to same-sex marriage and suggested outreach towards gay people.

Beginning in the 1960s, a number of organizations have formed to minister to LGBT people. Organizations such as Outreach Catholic, DignityUSA and New Ways Ministry, which advocate for the rights of LGBT Catholics and dissent from Church teaching, and Courage International, which encourages Catholics with same-sex attraction to live chastely and accept Church teaching, were established in the United States in response to the push within the United States for greater recognition within the church for gay men and lesbian women. Courage also has a ministry geared towards the relatives and friends of gay people called Encourage. Courage is a recognized apostolate of the church, while DignityUSA and New Ways Ministry have both been censured by the hierarchy of the American Catholic Church.

== Dissent from Catholic doctrine ==
There have been practical and ministerial disagreements within the clergy, hierarchy, and laity of the Catholic Church concerning the church's position on homosexuality. Some Catholics and Catholic groups have sought to adopt an approach they consider to be more inclusive. Dissenters argue that the prohibition on extramarital sex emphasizes the physical dimension of the act at the expense of higher moral, personal and spiritual goals and that the practice of total, lifelong sexual denial risks personal isolation. Other arguments include that the teaching violates "the truth of God's unconditional love for all people", and drives "young people away from the church". Opponents argue that it is preferable to believe that this element of church teaching is mistaken. The opinion of lay Catholics tends to be more supportive of gay marriage than the hierarchy.

Upwards of 70 people have been fired from jobs at Catholic schools or universities because of their marriages to partners of the same sex or, in one case, support for LGBT rights campaigns. When one Jesuit high school refused to fire a teacher after he publicly entered into a gay marriage, the local bishop designated the school as no longer Catholic; the school has appealed his decision. As of 2019, the Holy See has temporarily suspended the bishop's decree.

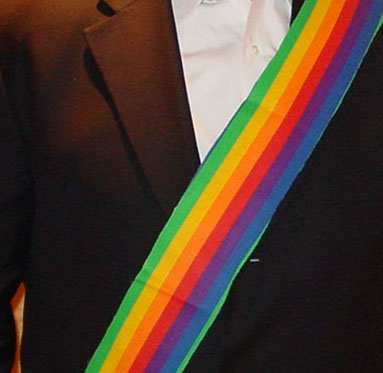
An ornamental sash featuring the rainbow colors of the LGBT flag

In response to church policy promoting chastity-only sex education and condemning sex education including condoms, some gay rights activists have protested both inside and outside of Catholic churches, sometimes disrupting Masses. This includes at the National Shrine in Washington, at an ordination of priests at the Cathedral of the Holy Cross in Boston, and during Mass at Saint Patrick's Cathedral in New York where they desecrated the Holy Eucharist. Others have splattered paint on churches and drenched an archbishop with water. In 1998, Alfredo Ormando died after setting himself on fire outside Saint Peter's Basilica to protest the church's position on homosexuality.

On 9 September 2022, over 80% of German bishops at the Synodal Path supported a document calling for a "re-evaluation of homosexuality" and for making changes to the Catechism. (Note: Supporting bishops are archbishop Reinhard Marx from Roman Catholic Archdiocese of Munich and Freising, bishop Karl-Heinz Wiesemann from Roman Catholic Diocese of Speyer, bishop Franz Jung, from Roman Catholic Diocese of Würzburg, archbishop Heiner Koch from Roman Catholic Archdiocese of Berlin, archbishop Stefan Heße from Roman Catholic Archdiocese of Hamburg, bishop Heinrich Timmerevers from Roman Catholic Diocese of Dresden–Meissen, bishop Michael Gerber from Roman Catholic Diocese of Fulda, Gerhard Feige from Roman Catholic Diocese of Magdeburg, bishop Helmut Dieser from Roman Catholic Diocese of Aachen, bishop Heiner Wilmer from Roman Catholic Diocese of Hildesheim, bishop Franz-Josef Hermann Bode from Roman Catholic Diocese of Osnabrück, bishop Felix Genn from Roman Catholic Diocese of Münster, bishop Georg Bätzing from Roman Catholic Diocese of Limburg, bishop Franz-Josef Overbeck from Roman Catholic Diocese of Essen, bishop Stephan Ackermann from Roman Catholic Diocese of Trier, bishop Peter Kohlgraf from Roman Catholic Diocese of Mainz, bishop Gebhard Fürst from Roman Catholic Diocese of Rottenburg-Stuttgart, auxiliary bishop Josef Holtkotte from Roman Catholic Archdiocese of Paderborn, auxiliary bishop Karl Borsch from Roman Catholic Diocese of Aachen, auxiliary bishop Ludger Schepers from Roman Catholic Diocese of Essen, auxiliary bishop Christoph Hegge from Roman Catholic Diocese of Münster, auxiliary bishop Gerhard Schneider from Roman Catholic Diocese of Rottenburg-Stuttgart, auxiliary bishop Karl Heinz Diez from Roman Catholic Diocese of Fulda, auxiliary bishop Peter Birkhofer from Roman Catholic Archdiocese of Freiburg, auxiliary bishop Reinhard Hauke from Roman Catholic Diocese of Erfurt, auxiliary bishop Udo Bentz from Roman Catholic Diocese of Mainz, auxiliary bishop Christian Würtz from Roman Catholic Archdiocese of Freiburg, auxiliary bishop Franz Josef Gebert from Roman Catholic Diocese of Trier, auxiliary bishop Heinz Günter Bongartz from Roman Catholic Diocese of Hildesheim, auxiliary bishop Herwig Gössel from Roman Catholic Archdiocese of Bamberg, auxiliary bishop Horst Eberlein from Roman Catholic Archdiocese of Hamburg, auxiliary bishop Johannes Wübbe from Roman Catholic Diocese of Osnabrück, auxiliary bishop Matthäus Karrer from Roman Catholic Diocese of Rottenburg-Stuttgart, auxiliary bishop Matthias König from Roman Catholic Archdiocese of Paderborn, auxiliary bishop Robert Brahm from Roman Catholic Diocese of Trier, auxiliary bishop Thomas Maria Renz from Roman Catholic Diocese of Rottenburg-Stuttgart, auxiliary bishop Ulrich Boom from Roman Catholic Diocese of Würzburg, auxiliary bishop Wilfried Theising from Roman Catholic Diocese of Münster, auxiliary bishop Wilhelm Zimmermann from Roman Catholic Diocese of Essen and auxiliary bishop Wolfgang Bischof from Roman Catholic Archdiocese of Munich and Freising.) On March 11, 2023, the Synodal Path with support of over 80 percentage of German Roman Catholic bishops allowed blessing ceremonies for same-sex couples in all 27 German Roman Catholic dioceses.

== Catholic organizations ==
The Knights of Columbus, a Catholic fraternal organisation, has contributed over $14 million, one of the largest amounts in the United States, to political campaigns against same-sex marriage. The Catholic Medical Association of North America has stated that science "counters the myth that same-sex attraction is genetically predetermined and unchangeable, and offers hope for prevention and treatment." The Church, however, teaches that sexual orientation is not a choice. Bill Donohue, president of the Catholic League, has been criticized for describing the church child sex abuse crisis as a "homosexual" problem rather than a "pedophilia" problem. Donohue based his claim on the fact that most of the incidents involved sexual contact between men and boys rather than between men and girls.

Outreach Catholic is a Jesuit affiliated Catholic media site dedicated to LGBT advocacy. The site was founded by the Catholic priest, Father James Martin under the affiliation of America Magazine, a Jesuit news site. The group hosts a yearly conference to bring LGBT Catholics and allies together in hopes to further dialogue between the church and LGBT faithful. The site itself hosts a myriad of difference resources, news, and advocacy projects.

== Homosexual clergy ==
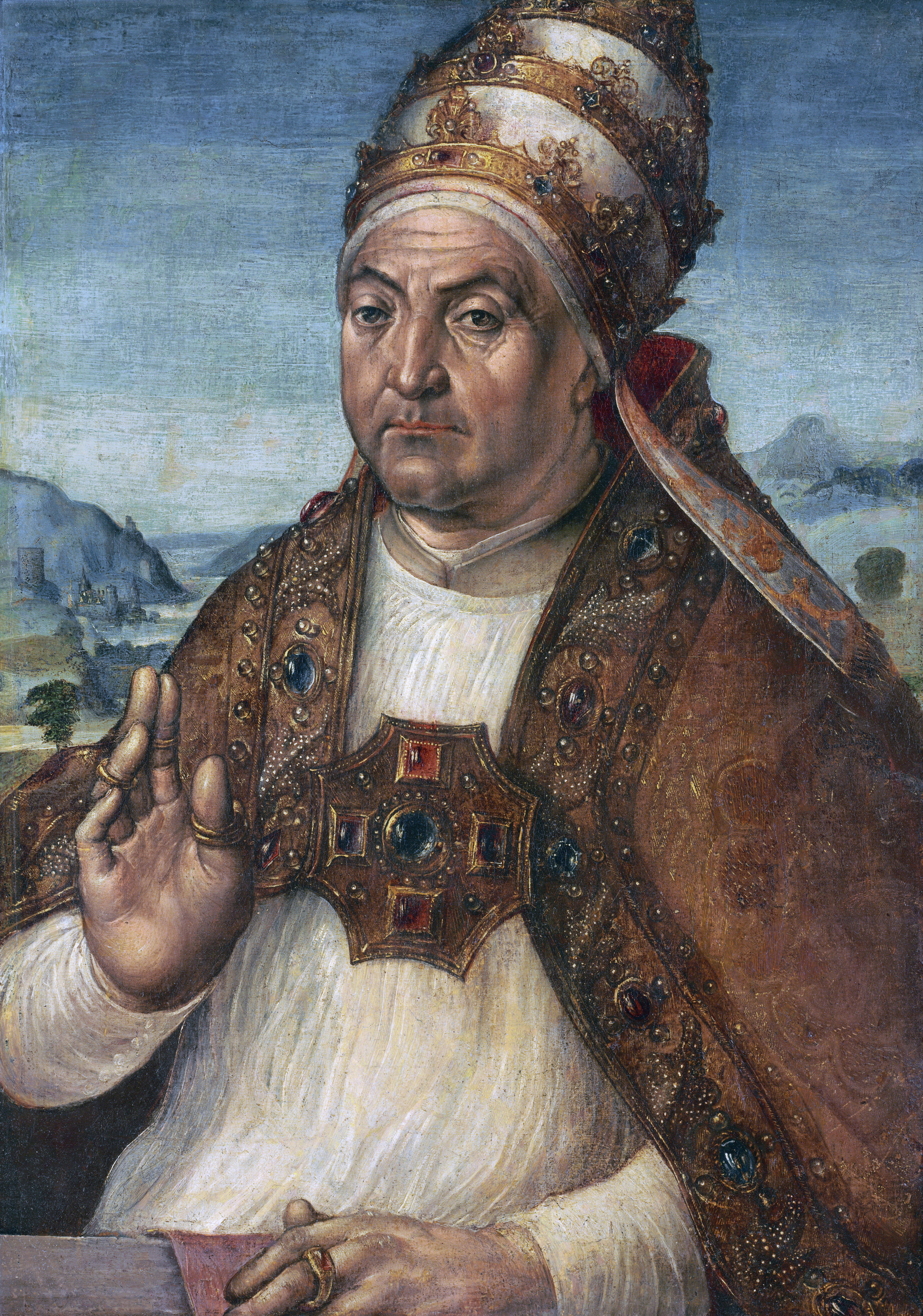
Pope Sixtus IV (1414—1484) who had a male romantic lover prior to receiving Holy Orders and later led a Holy Inquisition into the growing miraculous claims at Genazzano in 1482. Oil on Canvas by Pedro Berruguete. The Cleveland Museum of Art.

Homosexual clergy and their homosexual activities are not exclusively modern phenomena, but rather date back centuries. The Catholic priest Donald Cozzens estimated the percentage of gay priests in 2000 to be 23–58%, suggesting more homosexual men (active and non-active) within the Catholic priesthood than within society at large.

Instructions from Vatican bodies on admitting gay men to the priesthood have varied over time. In the 1960s chaste gay men were allowed but in 2005, a new directive banned gay men "while profoundly respecting the persons in question."

Although homosexuality was at variance with Catholic teaching during the Middle Ages, official penalties for homosexual behavior within the clergy, both by the church and temporal authorities, were rarely codified or enforced. Historian John Boswell noted that several bishops in the Middle Ages were thought by their contemporaries to have had gay relationships, and noted a potentially romantic or sexual tone to the correspondence of others with "passionate" male friends. Some other historians disagree, and say that this correspondence represents friendship. Although homosexual acts have been consistently condemned by the Catholic Church, some senior members of the clergy have been found or alleged to have had homosexual relationships, including Rembert Weakland, Juan Carlos Maccarone, Francisco Domingo Barbosa Da Silveira, and Keith O'Brien. Some popes are documented to have been homosexual or to have had male sexual partners, including Benedict IX, Paul II, Sixtus IV, Leo X, Julius II and Julius III.

== Political activity ==
Historically, the Catholic Church has been politically active in local, national, and international fora on issues of LGBT rights, typically to oppose them in keeping with Catholic moral theology and Catholic Social Teaching.

The Catholic Church has been described as sending "mixed signals" regarding discrimination based on sexual orientation. In various countries, members of the Catholic Church have intervened on occasions both to support efforts to decriminalize homosexuality, and to ensure it remains an offence under criminal law. A 1992 teaching said that because homosexuality "evokes moral concern," sexual orientation is different from qualities such as race, ethnicity, sex, or age, which are not tied to morality. It added that efforts to "protect the common good" by limiting rights were permissible and sometimes obligatory, and did not constitute discrimination. The church therefore opposes the extension of at least some aspects of civil rights legislation, such as nondiscrimination in public housing, educational or athletic employment, adoption, or military recruitment, to cover gay men and lesbians. The United States Conference of Catholic Bishops published a statement that was characterized by two theologians as claiming that "nondiscrimination legislation protecting LGBT people promotes immoral sexual behavior, endangers our children, and threatens religious liberty."

The Catholic Church campaigns against same-sex marriage, but Pope Francis expressed support for civil unions in different European and South American countries as an alternative. Catholic doctrine maintains that marriage can only be the union of a man and a woman.

The Church's opposition to condoms, despite their proven effectiveness in preventing the spread of HIV, has invited criticism from public health officials, anti-HIV activists, and the broader LGBT community.

== Notable LGBT Catholics ==
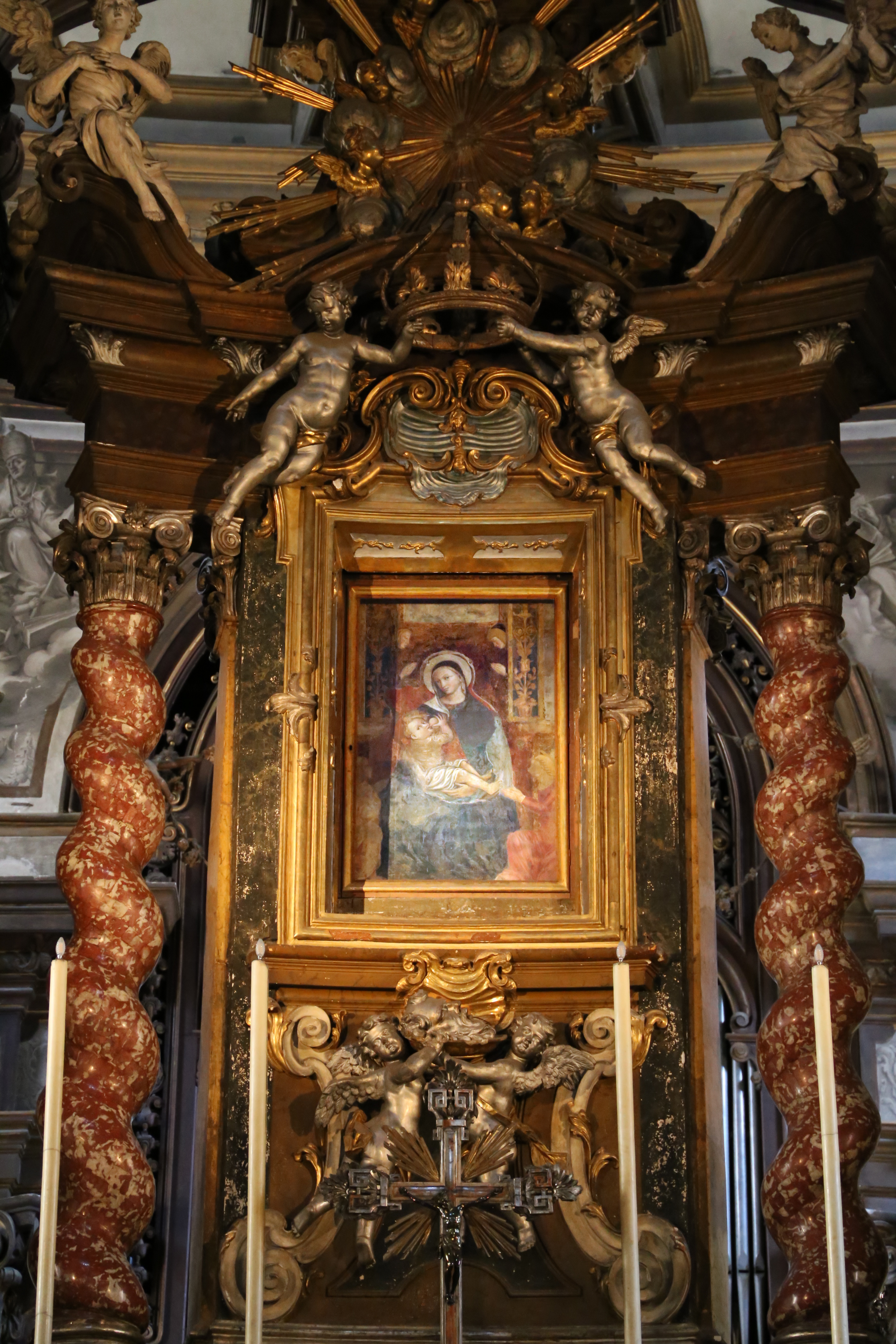
The Nursing Madonna enshrined at the Basilica of Santa Maria della Steccata, crowned by the pioneer form of canonical coronation by its original promotor who was a gay male, friar Jeronimo (Girolamo) Paolucci di Calboldi di Forli on 27 May 1601

There have been notable gay Catholics throughout history. Writers such as Oscar Wilde, Lord Alfred Douglas, Marc-André Raffalovich, and Frederick Rolfe, and artists such as Robert Mapplethorpe and Andy Warhol were influenced by both their Catholicism and their homosexuality.

Gay Catholic academics such as John J. McNeill, (expelled from the Society of Jesus in 1987 at the request of the Vatican), and author John Boswell have produced work on the history and theological issues at the intersection of Christianity and homosexuality. Some notable gay rights activists are or were priests or nuns, such as McNeill, Virginia Apuzzo, and Jean O'Leary.

Singer Lady Gaga is a bisexual woman and a Catholic.

== See also ==
- List of Christian denominational positions on homosexuality
- Ministry to Persons with a Homosexual Inclination
- Ordination of LGBT Christian clergy
- Pope Francis and LGBT topics

== Works cited ==
- Allen, John L. (30 May 2013). The Catholic Church: What Everyone Needs to Know. OUP USA. ISBN 978-0-19-997510-5.
- Boswell, John (1980). Christianity, Social Tolerance, and Homosexuality. Chicago: University of Chicago Press.
- Jung, Patricia Beattie (2007). "The Roman Catholic Tradition". In Siker, Jeffrey S. (ed.). Homosexuality and Religion: An Encyclopedia. Westport, Connecticut: Greenwood Publishing. pp. 191–200. ISBN 978-0313330889. OCLC 803676004.
