= True Freedom Trust =

True Freedom Trust (TFT) is a "UK-based teaching and pastoral support ministry that holds to the orthodox biblical view of sex, gender and relationships". It takes the view that homosexual activity is sinful, but being homosexual is not sinful in and of itself and, therefore, advocates celibacy for those of its gay and lesbian members who do not consider marriage to someone of the opposite sex to be a viable option. While this view is usually strongly rejected by LGBT organizations and individuals, there are some LGBT-identified Christians who emphatically support and practice it.

== History ==
True freedom Trust was founded in 1977 by Anglican clergyman Canon L. Roy Barker and Martin Hallett, a man who had been "involved in a homosexual lifestyle" for nine years. Chris Medcalf, who founded the Turnabout UK organisation and ran the London office of True Freedom Trust after Turnabout merged with it, had to resign when his improper conduct with male clients was made public in 1995. Canon Barker died in 2004, and the organisation was led by Martin Hallett until his retirement in 2009.

In 2001, when UK ex-gay ministry Courage UK announced it was now gay-affirming, TFT Director Martin Hallett told supporters that TFT would not be following suit, and that it retained the belief that homosexual "genital activity" was always wrong. In 2004, the Holy Trinity Church in Barnet pledged to give £5,500 a year to the True Freedom Trust to encourage sexual transformation. In October 2009, Jonathan Berry was appointed as the new Director. Berry says that he was converted out of homosexuality at the age of 24. In January 2018, Stuart Parker was appointed as the new Director. In 2025, Nat Johnson took over as the National Director.

== Description ==
True Freedom Trust is based in Wirral, UK. In 2018, True Freedom Trust had 1800 members and 14 local support groups for men and women and their families in the UK and Ireland.

TFT generally works on a referral basis, where Christians who are "struggling" with their sexuality are put in touch with the main office, assessed, and advised what to do next. Often this involves one-to-one support, or referral to a local "Barnabas" group for ongoing support. The Barnabas groups are informal meetings designed for Christians (in theory, both gay and straight) to offer one another support and encouragement. There are several nationwide.

TFT has made it clear that it does not advocate conversion therapy, but rather Christian discipleship, as the hope for same-sex attracted Christians. TFT does not generally encourage gay Christians to expect to be healed of their orientation, although it says that change is possible. Therefore, although because of its historical affiliations and its stance against homosexual behavior, it is often considered to be a part of the ex-gay movement.

== See also ==
- Abiding Truth Ministries
- Ex-ex-gay
- GLAAD
- Homophobia
- Matthew Shepard Foundation
- Recovering from Religion
- The Trevor Project
