= Persona humana =

1975 document by the Congregation for the Doctrine of the Faith

Persona Humana is a document published by the Congregation for the Doctrine of the Faith in 1975. It is a declaration on certain questions concerning sexual ethics.

Persona Humana regards human sexuality as a central element of the person because it gives the person's life the principal traits that distinguish it. The exaltation of sex outside of marriage in contemporary society occasioned the CDF to clarify the Roman Catholic Church's position on sexual ethics. The line of thought of Persona Humana revolves around the observation that "Man has been made by God to participate in His Divine Law with the result that, under the gentle disposition of Divine Providence, he can come to perceive ever increasingly the unchanging truth. Since this Divine Law is accessible to our minds, we cannot make value judgments according to our personal whim in moral matters."
