= On the Pastoral Care of Homosexual Persons =

Catholic pastoral letter on homosexuality

The document On the Pastoral Care of Homosexual Persons, also known by its opening words in Latin (Homosexualitatis problema) or as the "Halloween Letter", was a pastoral letter addressed to the world's Catholic Bishops by the Catholic Church's Congregation for the Doctrine of the Faith (CDF) which was widely seen as hostile to same-sex relationships and condescending and damaging to those inside and outside the church who identified as LGBT. It was published in Rome on 1 October 1986; its primary authors, on behalf of the CDF, were the conservative Cardinal Prefect, Joseph Ratzinger (later Pope Benedict XVI) and CDF Secretary, Archbishop Alberto Bovone.

== Content ==
The letter gave instructions on how the clergy should deal with and respond to lesbian, gay, and bisexual people. Pope John Paul II approved the letter and ordered its publication. It was designed to correct what it said were misunderstandings and misinterpretations of a 1975 CDF letter, Declaration on Certain Questions Concerning Sexual Ethics (Persona Humana).

In the letter, Ratzinger sought to clarify the Church's teaching on the sinfulness of gay sexual acts, sexual "compulsion" and "culpability", and what he described as the "choice" of a homosexual orientation:

It has been argued that the homosexual orientation in certain cases is not the result of deliberate choice; and so the homosexual person would then have no choice but to behave in a homosexual fashion. Lacking freedom, such a person, even if engaged in homosexual activity, would not be culpable. Here, the Church's wise moral tradition is necessary since it warns against generalizations in judging individual cases. In fact, circumstances may exist, or may have existed in the past, which would reduce or remove the culpability of the individual in a given instance; or other circumstances may increase it. What is at all costs to be avoided is the unfounded and demeaning assumption that the sexual behaviour of homosexual persons is always and totally compulsive and therefore inculpable.

Further, "Although the particular inclination of the homosexual person is not a sin, it is a more or less strong tendency ordered toward an intrinsic moral evil; and thus the inclination itself must be seen as an objective disorder.

However, at the same time: "... It is deplorable that homosexual persons have been and are the object of violent malice in speech or in action. Such treatment deserves condemnation from the Church's pastors wherever it occurs."

Ratzinger asserted that, while Christians must oppose violence against GLBT persons, it is wrong to extend this teaching so as to allow that "the homosexual orientation" is morally good or even neutral. Such extension was the main problem he saw with the way the Vatican's 1975 declaration had been received. The 1986 letter was primarily designed to counter these "overly benign" or accepting views. In one of the more problematic parts of the letter, about "'violent reactions", it was thus said:

... the proper reaction to crimes committed against homosexual persons should not be to claim that the homosexual condition is not disordered. When such a claim is made and when homosexual activity is consequently condoned, or when civil legislation is introduced to protect behaviour to which no one has any conceivable right, neither the Church nor society at large should be surprised when other distorted notions and practices gain ground, and irrational and violent reactions increase.

== Legacy ==
Much of the content of the letter has subsequently been moderated or walked back — by revised and reworded teachings and by direct papal statements; in the years since 1986, each of these has been somewhat more enlightened by the jurisprudence and theology of human and civil rights and non-discrimination, and somewhat more informed about the developing science, medicine, psychology and sociology of same-sex attraction.

While the 1986 letter directly targeted gay advocacy groups, and sought to instruct bishops to withdraw support from GLBT communities, such advocacy and ministry and community has continued within and toward the church in the years that have followed. This has coincided with the increasing civil rights recognition of the licitness of same-sex attraction, adoption of non-discrimination frameworks, and even acceptance of gay marriage in many western nations and in other christian churches with which the Catholic Church strives to be in dialogue and communion. The Vatican has been lobbied, increasingly over this period, to adjust its approach and to minister faithfully to these vulnerable LGBT communities consistent with its broader teachings concerning love for the other, human dignity, and freedom.

In 2006, for example, the United States Conference of Catholic Bishops (USCCB) issued "Guidelines for Pastoral Care" for those in the Ministry to Persons with a Homosexual Inclination.

== English-Language Translation Issues ==
A less commonly discussed issue with Homosexualitatis Problema surrounds Section 16, which is one of the document's most-quoted sections. A crucial word ("solely") was left out of an early English translation (and also the French, but not other translations in German, Portuguese, Spanish, and Italian), introducing a dramatic change of meaning into the passage. Thus, a sentence which should have read:

"Today, the Church provides a badly needed context for the care of the human person when she refuses to consider the person solely as a 'heterosexual' or a 'homosexual' and insists that every person has a fundamental identity: the creature of God, and by grace, his child and heir to eternal life."

Instead was widely reproduced across the English-speaking Catholic world as:

"Today, the Church provides a badly needed context for the care of the human person when she refuses to consider the person as a 'heterosexual' or a 'homosexual' and insists that every person has a fundamental identity: the creature of God, and by grace, his child and heir to eternal life."

The history of this mistranslation, its effects in English-language Catholic discourse, and its eventual correction by the Vatican have been addressed by Vincent G'Sell at Where Peter Is, Joshua Gonnerman at First Things, and Ron Belgau at Spiritual Friendship.

== See also ==
- Catholic teachings on sexual morality
- Homosexuality and Roman Catholicism
- Virtually Normal
