= Ex-ex-gay =

Former participants in the ex-gay movement who are not heterosexual

Ex-ex-gay people are those who formerly participated in the ex-gay movement in an attempt to change their sexual orientation to heterosexual, but who later went on to publicly state they had a non-heterosexual sexual orientation. The movement was organized in 1973 and collapsed in 2013, though there was no defined 'end'.

Organizations in the ex-gay movement such as Exodus International offer conversion therapy, with the claim that an LGBTQ person's involvement in the programming can change their sexual orientation to heterosexual. This type of programming is opposed by major medical organizations in the US, including The National Association of Social Workers, The American Psychological Association, The American Psychiatric Association, The American Counseling Association, and The American Academy of Pediatrics. The American Psychiatric Association describes conversion therapy as ineffective at changing sexual orientation, and as harmful to the LGBT person's well-being. Studies conducted on the effectiveness of conversion therapy states that 96% of the time conversion efforts were unaffected and caused more psychological harm to the patient than otherwise noted. After conversion therapy there was 92% greater odds of suicidality, 75% more planned suicide attempts, and an 88% increase in attempting suicide. It is also opposed by the United Kingdom Council for Psychotherapy, who issued a joint leaflet with the British Psychoanalytic Council, the Royal College of Psychiatrists, the British Association for Counselling and Psychotherapy, the British Psychological Society, Pink Therapy, The National Counselling Society and LGBTQ rights group Stonewall against such practices.

In 1979, Exodus International's co-founder Michael Bussee and his partner, Gary Cooper, quit the group and held a life commitment ceremony together. On June 27, 2007, Bussee, along with fellow former Exodus leaders Jeremy Marks and Darlene Bogle, issued a public apology for their roles in Exodus. Exodus disbanded as an organization on June 20, 2013. The vice president of Exodus, Randy Thomas, had a long and outspoken past regarding anti-LGBTQ rhetoric. Since being disbanded, he has spoken out and renounced his past work, acknowledging the pain it caused to the LGBTQ+ community.

== People who no longer support the ex-gay movement ==
- Günter Baum founded an ex-gay ministry in Germany. Later he formed Zwischenraum, which helps gay Christians to accept their sexuality and to reconcile it with their beliefs.
- Christine Bakke. In April 2007, Toscano (below) and Bakke founded Beyond Ex-Gay, an on-line resource for ex-ex gays. In June 2007, together with Soulforce and the LGBT Resource Center at University of California, Irvine, Bakke participated in organizing the first-ever Ex-Gay Survivor Conference.
- Michael Bussee and Gary Cooper, co-founders of Exodus International, left the organization and in 1979, held a life commitment ceremony. Bussee went on to become an outspoken critic of Exodus and the ex-gay movement. In June 2007, Bussee issued an apology for his part in the ex-gay movement.
- Yvette Cantu Schneider spent fourteen years working for the "ex-gay" movement, including as a researcher for the Family Research Council and the director of Women's Ministries at Exodus International. She later came out as bisexual and is an outspoken advocate against the ex-gay movement.
- Alan Chambers, who formerly served as president of Exodus International, later acknowledged his gay orientation and apologized in 2013.
- McKrae Game founded Hope for Wholeness, one of the largest conversion therapy programs in the United States. He came out as gay in June 2019, two years after being fired from the program.
- Ben Gresham is an Australian man who went through three years of ex-gay therapy starting at 16 years of age. He does media appearances, including ABC TV's The Hack Half Hour, SX News and Triple J (radio) regarding what he sees as the dangers of ex-gay programs and the psychological harm associated with them. Along with this, Gresham was a part of "Freedom2b", which offered support to LGBTQ people from church backgrounds.
- Noe Gutierrez appeared in Warren Throckmorton's ex-gay video I Do Exist in 2004. This garnered some notice, as Gutierrez had previously appeared in a video for gay youth known as It's Elementary. Gutierrez later left the ex-gay movement and wrote about his experience.
- David Matheson, a counselor who ran a weekend program offered by Rich Wyler's conversion therapy organization Brothers on a Road Less Traveled, came out via Facebook in early 2019 after a different private Facebook message by Wyler was obtained by the LGBT non-profit Truth Wins Out.
- John Paulk, founder of Focus on the Family's ex-gay ministry Love Won Out and former chairman of Exodus International North America, renounced his claim to ex-gay status, denied that sexual orientation change is effective, and apologized for the harm he had caused in a formal apology in 2013.
- Julie Rodgers was a former member at the conversion therapy institute Living Hope Ministries, and speaker and blog writer at Exodus International. She left the ex-gay movement, came out as a lesbian, and published the book Outlove: A Queer Christian Survival Story.
- John Smid is the former director of the Memphis, Tennessee, ex-gay ministry Love In Action, a position in which he was a leading spokesperson for converting homosexuals into heterosexuals. In 2011, years after having left his Love In Action post, he stated that he was homosexual, and that he had "never met a man who experienced a change from homosexual to heterosexual."
- Peterson Toscano is an actor who was involved in the ex-gay movement for 17 years. He performs a related one-man satire titled Doin' Time in the Homo No Mo Halfway House, and with Christine Bakke runs Beyond Ex-Gay, a support website for people coming out of ex-gay experiences.
- Anthony Venn-Brown is an Australian former evangelist in the Assemblies of God and an author whose book, A Life of Unlearning, describes his experience in Australia's first ex-gay program. Venn-Brown co-founded Freedom2b, which offers support to LGBT people from church backgrounds who have been displaced from the ex-gay movement. In 2007, he co-ordinated the release of a statement from five Australian ex-gay leaders who publicly apologized for their past actions. Venn-Brown has been a leader in monitoring ex-gay activities in Australia, New Zealand and Asia and countering the "ex-gay myth".
- NPR was one of the few major news outlets to speak out against the anti-gay movement, interviewing survivors, offering coverage and giving voices to the victims.

== See also ==
- Queer theology
- Wayne Besen, gay rights activist and author of Anything But Straight
