= Frank Worthen =

American ex-gay movement leader

- Born: 1929
- Died: 11 February 2017 (aged 87–88)
- Years active: 1973–2017
- Organizations: Exodus International; Love in Action; Restored Hope Network
- Movement: Ex-gay movement
- Spouse: Anita Worthen

Frank Worthen (1929–2017) was an American Christian apologist who described himself as a former homosexual. He was a prominent figure of the ex-gay movement, having founded the New Hope Ministry, a residential ex-gay program which became one of the most prominent in the United States, in 1973. He was also a founder of Exodus International, an umbrella group that covered 100 ex-gay groups, and also founded prominent ex-gay organization Love in Action. After New Hope Ministry closed down in 2013, he founded the Restored Hope Network and ran it alongside Anne Paulk.

== Biography ==
Worthen said that he had been made aware of his homosexuality at the age of 13, following the death of his father, after which a gay pastor became his father figure. At the age of 44, after suffering from suicidal thoughts, he joined a church and came "out of the gay lifestyle" in 1973. He founded Love in Action in the same year, after recording a cassette tape in which he told his story and advertising it in a San Francisco gay newspaper. He then started advocating for the theory that homosexuality can be caused by a lack of a present father figure.

He eventually married Anita Worthen, who he first met when she was looking for a way to convert her teenager son out of his homosexuality. Anita has also operated a conversion therapy group for lesbians. In 1991, the couple traveled to the Philippines in order to found an ex-gay ministry, leaving Love in Action to be managed by John Smid. Smid eventually stepped out of and denounced the organization, after which Worthen stated that he regretted appointing him as the leader of the ministry. In 1998, Worthen's son was still identifying as gay, at the age of 34.

After New Hope Ministry closed down in 2013, Worthen founded the Restored Hope Network and designated John Paulk's ex-wife Anne Paulk as its executive director. Worthen died in 2017, at the age of 87. John stated that, although he did "not support nor endorse this movement any longer, I mourn Frank's passing". Smid also wrote that "I can respect Frank’s integrity. He remained faithful to what he believed throughout his being until the very end of his life."
