= Sy Rogers =

American Christian pastor

- Born: Sinclair Rogers II; December 15, 1956; United States
- Died: April 19, 2020 (aged 63); Winter Park, Florida, US
- Occupations: Pastor, activist

Sinclair Rogers II (December 15, 1956 – April 19, 2020) was an American Christian pastor who was part of the ex-gay movement. In the late 1980s, Rogers was a President of Exodus International, and became one of the earliest personalities associated with the ex-gay movement. He wrote a life-story entitled "The Man in the Mirror," which was published in pamphlet form by Last Days Ministries.

== Life and career ==
Rogers had a traumatic childhood. He was molested as a toddler, and his mother died in a car accident when he was four. After his mother's death, his father left him with relatives for a year. Later, at school, he was bullied for effeminate mannerisms and experienced shame over same-sex attraction.

Rogers joined the Navy in 1973 and was stationed in Honolulu. He became active in the gay community and also worked as a prostitute where, "I pretended I was being loved." He later identified as transgender, living as a woman for a year and a half and beginning the process of arranging to have sex-change surgery. He credited his conversion to Christianity for igniting personal growth and a new-found security in his gender identity which enabled a shift in his sexuality to heterosexual. He stated in his personal story, "My goal was not to be straight--it was God". In 1982, he began to identify as heterosexual, married a woman he met in a Bible-study group, and went on to raise a family together.

In 1988 the 30-year-old Rogers gave an interview covering his perspectives to the Chicago Sun-Times. Living in Florida, he was then a married father and a self-described former homosexual and transgender. He told the reporter the ex-gay movement was not anti-gay, "If you want to stay gay, that's your business,... But the bottom line is, you have a choice to overcome it. You can change." "The goal is God--not going straight. Straight people don't go to Heaven, redeemed people do."

During Rogers' involvement in the mid to late 1980s, Exodus International, now Restored Hope Network, had offices on five continents and declared that "all homosexual relationships are sinful." In conducting a speaking tour in 2008 Rogers' message included, "Homosexuality is out of tune with religion; it is not what God planned for human sexuality." Writing in The Gay & Lesbian Review Worldwide, gay rights advocate Wayne Besen argued that during the AIDS epidemic "some men were literally scared straight - or at least into making the futile attempt," bringing a degree of momentary success to Exodus International.

In 2016, The Daily Beast wrote that Rogers's ministry had moved away from the ex-gay message. Sy's later speaking ministry included and exceeded homosexual issues, often referencing sex in the larger context of God and culture.

In Singapore, Rogers helped to set up Choices, the ex-gay ministry at Church of Our Saviour. He also preached regularly at City Harvest Church, Faith Community Baptist Church and Heart of God Church.

Rogers is portrayed in the 1993 documentary One Nation Under God. From 2012, he was a Teaching Pastor with the multi-campus LIFE Church & College in Auckland, New Zealand.

== Music career ==
In 1995 Rogers released a Synthpop and Technopop album called Metropolis released on MTX and All Good Gifts Ministries, in Singapore.

Metropolis (1995)

Tracklist.

1.Technobop

2.Love Goddess

3.Metropolis

4 Sex

5.Image

6.Dysfunctional

7.Monitor

8.Consumers

9.Faces

== Death ==
Rogers died in Winter Park, Florida on April 19, 2020, from cancer. He was survived by his wife of 38 years, Karen Ann Campbell, their daughter and two grandchildren.
