= Day of Dialogue =

Christian event

In the United States, the Day of Dialogue (formerly Day of Truth) is the Christian fundamentalist group Focus on the Family's annual event to oppose LGBTQ rights. It was founded by the Alliance Defense Fund in 2005 to oppose the Day of Silence, an annual day of protest against the harassment and bullying of LGBTQ students that was organized by Gay, Lesbian & Straight Education Network. Since 2018 the Day of Dialogue is not marked on a single date or organized nationally.

== History ==
=== ADF's Day of Truth ===
The "Day of Truth" event was first organized in 2005, primarily through the efforts of the Alliance Defense Fund, with the endorsement of several major conservative and anti-LGBT organizations, including the Christian ministry group Focus on the Family and the Southern Baptist Convention's Ethics and Religious Liberty Commission.

ADF claims that students who have attempted to speak against same-sex relationships and behavior have been censored or, in some cases, punished for their actions under campus hate-speech rules, such as Tyler Chase Harper, a high school student whose suspension led to the first Day of Truth. Harper was suspended for wearing a T-shirt that read "Be Ashamed" and "Our School Embraced What God Has Condemned," and on the back read, "Homosexuality is Shameful" and "Romans 1:27." The Alliance Defense Fund filed an unsuccessful federal lawsuit against school officials on behalf of Harper, claiming his religious freedoms were violated. The case was appealed to the Supreme Court. The Supreme Court ruled that the case was moot because Harper had already graduated, declined to further consider it, and ordered the lower court to vacate its decision against Harper, leaving future matters open for litigation as though the previous trial had never occurred.

According to ADF, over 1,100 students in 350 schools participated in the first Day of Truth, in 2005.

The second Day of Truth was held on April 27, 2006, with nearly 3,000 students from more than 800 schools participating, according to ADF statistics. In February, ADF alleged that various unnamed bloggers opposed to the Day of Truth had attempted to undermine the event by swamping the Day of Truth web site with requests for brochures.

According to ADF, more than 7,000 students participated in the third Day of Truth, which was held on April 19, 2007.

In one of several Day of Truth-related legal actions, ADF filed a federal lawsuit in 2006 on behalf of a student who they claim was prevented by his school from participating in the event, despite allowing the Day of Silence. ADF reached a settlement with the student's North Carolina high school in 2007, allowing the student to participate in Day of Truth.

Kevin Jennings of the Gay, Lesbian and Straight Education Network (GLSEN) has described the event as "a publicity stunt cooked up by a conservative organization with a political agenda; it’s an effort by adults to manipulate some kids." In response, Mike Johnson of ADF contends that “We wouldn’t have come up with the Day of Truth if Christian kids hadn’t been silenced in the first place. . . . The public school is part of the free market of ideas — if the other side is going to advance their point of view, it’s only fair for the Christian perspective to present their view, too."

=== After ADF ===
ADF announced that beginning in 2009, it passed on its leadership role in the Day of Truth to an ex-gay organization, Exodus International, which had already participated in running the event. In October 2010, Exodus announced they would no longer support the event. President Alan Chambers stated they realised they needed to "equip kids to live out biblical tolerance and grace while treating their neighbors as they'd like to be treated, whether they agree with them or not", adding that the Day of Truth was becoming too divisive. Chambers said that Exodus had not changed its position on homosexuality, rather they were reevaluating how to best communicate their message.

On November 6, 2010, Focus on the Family announced it had acquired the Day of Truth event and was renaming it to the Day of Dialogue. Focus on the Family said it would maintain the event's goal of "encouraging honest and respectful conversation among students about God's design for sexuality."

== See also ==
- Straight pride
