= Anne Paulk =

American ex-lesbian activist

Anne Edward (formerly Paulk) is the executive director of Restored Hope Network, an interdenominational Christian ex-gay ministry headed up primarily of former members of Exodus International.

Edward identifies as an ex-lesbian. She co-wrote a book with her then-husband John Paulk called Love Won Out: How God's Love Helped 2 People Leave Homosexuality and Find Each Other. However the marriage ended in 2013, after her husband revealed that he was still gay and publicly renounced his past in the "ex-gay" movement.

== Biography ==
Edward experienced attraction to girls and women during her teen years, identifying as a lesbian in college and getting involved in a fully sexual lesbian relationship after college. She attributes her focus to having been molested by a 12 year old boy when she was four. She took to Christianity during college, and that led her to trying to address her lesbian feelings. By age 25, she was appreciating the attention of men. She married John Paulk in 1992, and they had their first child in 1996.

She and John began getting media attention. By 1993, they'd appeared on Oprah and by 1998, on The 700 Club. In 1998, she was the center of an ad campaign from conservative and Christian groups, promoting the concept that change from homosexuality was possible. The campaign included a full-page advertisement in the New York Times. Anne and John appeared together on the cover of the August 17, 1998, issue of Newsweek, under the banner "Gay For Life? Going Straight: The Uproar Over 'Sexual Conversion'".

Edward wrote the 2003 book Restoring Sexual Identity: Hope for Women Struggling with Same-Sex Attraction.

The Paulks divorced in 2013, after John accepted himself as a gay man and apologized for his involvement and support of ex-gay messaging. The couple had had three sons. Around this time, Edward founded the Restored Hope Network.
