= Anything but Straight =

2003 book by Wayne Besen

Anything But Straight: Unmasking the Scandals and Lies Behind the Ex-Gay Myth
- Cover of the first edition
- Author: Wayne Besen
- Language: English
- Subjects: Ex-gay movement Conversion therapy
- Publisher: Harrington Park Press
- Publication date: 2003
- Publication place: United States
- Media type: Print (Paperback)
- Pages: 311
- ISBN: 1-56023-445-8
- OCLC: 50583456
- Dewey Decimal: 261.8/3577 21
- LC Class: BV4437.5 .B47 2003

Anything But Straight: Unmasking the Scandals and Lies Behind the Ex-Gay Myth is a 2003 book by Wayne Besen, a gay rights advocate. The book examines the claims of prominent gay "conversion therapists" and provides insight into "ex-gay" ministries such as Love in Action, Exodus International, Homosexuals Anonymous.

The book received a positive review from American psychiatrist Jack Drescher, known for his work on sexual orientation and gender identity.
