= Mid-South Pride =

Mid-South Pride is a non-profit corporation located in Memphis, Tennessee. Mid-South Pride Memphis was founded in May 2003, to take over the work formerly done by Memphis Pride. Mid-South Pride produces the annual Pride Parade, Festival and Picnic for Memphis as well as other events that reflect the history of Pride in the LGBT community.

Mid-South Pride is led by an unpaid, board of directors and relies on volunteers and community support to produce the annual LGBT pride events. One of the major elements that separates Mid-South Pride from other pride organizations is the requirement that all events must be paid in full, so that the organization never takes on more than it can actually pay for.

Mid-South Pride is a member of the International LGBT Pride association, Interpride, and the International Festivals and Events Association.

== Board members ==
Gary Wilkerson, the founding President of Mid-South Pride and one of the Regional Directors for InterPride's Southern United States Region died on September 28, 2007. Sean Alexander and Kent Hamson took over in his place. It was later passed down to Mike Morgan.

In June 2008 Mid-South Pride brought Peterson Toscano, a former client of the Memphis-based ex-gay program Love in Action and an outspoken ex-ex-gay, back to Memphis to serve as a grand marshal of the pride parade and to perform.

In 2010 the Mid-South Pride Board moved to festival and parade from Cooper Young to Downtown after the city reclassified Peabody Park. They moved to Robert Church Park downtown behind the FedEx Forum.

Also in 2010 the group got new blood with Vanessa Rodley, Patrick Pearson, and Jennifer Murry as volunteers. With there help they took the festival from about 4,000 people to over 15,000 in attendance in 2017. They also had the largest budget in their history. This was also the first pride that made profit.

In 2012 the board added Vanessa Rodley to Vice President, Jennifer Murry to Secretary, and Patrick Pearson as an at large member. Making it a board of 6 which was the largest they had since they started.

In 2025 the event and parade had to be cancelled and rescheduled due to severe weather.

== Events ==
In 2014 they started hosting family events at parks, redbirds games, and the zoo. They also host an annual formal ball called the GAYla, and many other themed events. Because of the growth in 2016 the board chose to make a change and rename the annual festival to Memphis Pride Fest.
