= Peterson Toscano =

American dramatist

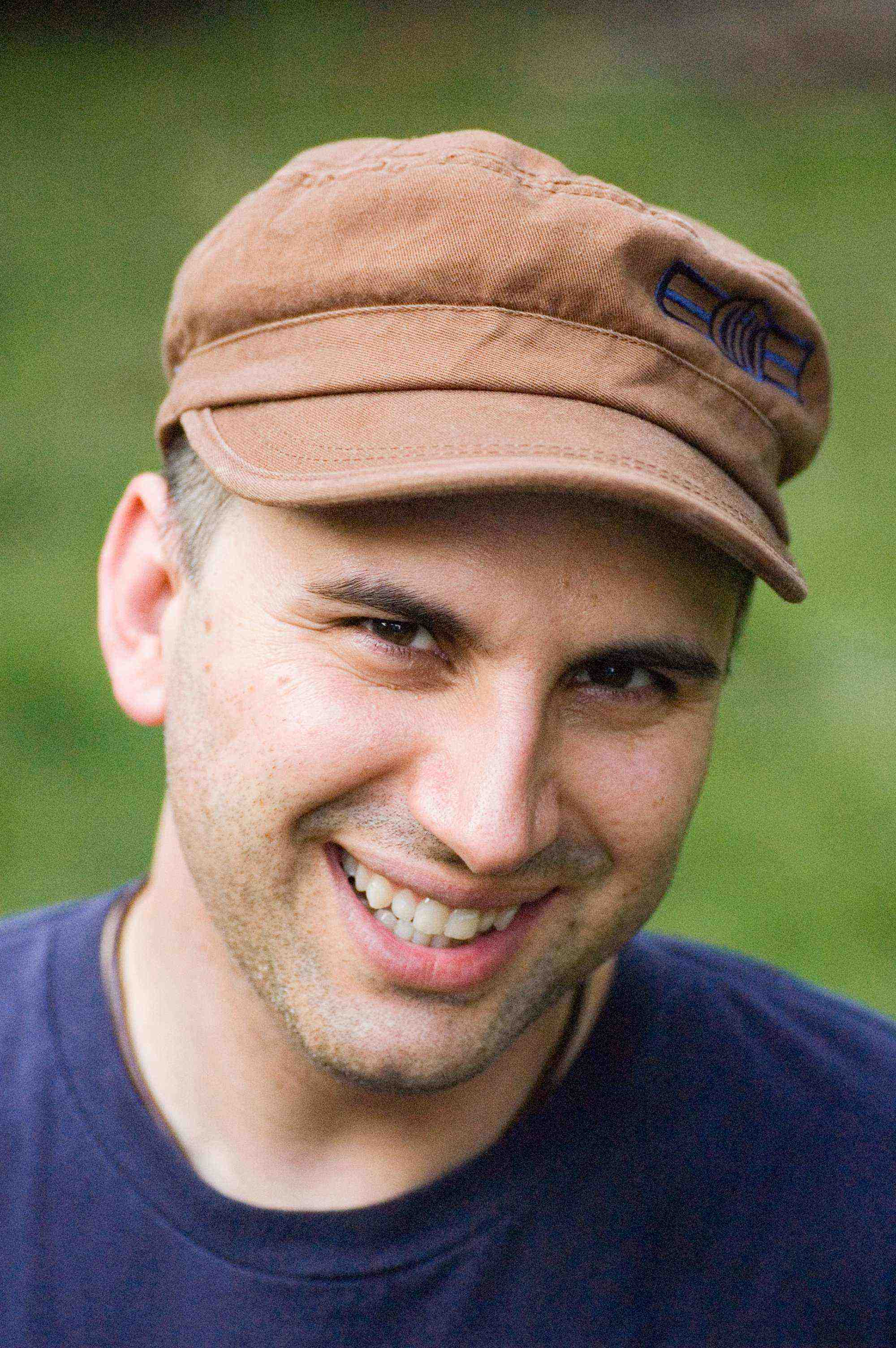
- Born: February 17, 1965 (age 61); Stamford, Connecticut, U.S.
- Education: City College of New York
- Spouse: Glen Retief

Peterson Toscano (born February 17, 1965, in Stamford, Connecticut) is a playwright, actor, Bible scholar, blogger, podcaster, advocate against global warming, and gay rights activist. Toscano spent nearly two decades undergoing ex-gay treatment and conversion therapy before accepting his sexual orientation and coming out as a gay man. He has since shared his experiences internationally through various media outlets, especially plays. His talks and performances use comedy and storytelling to explore LGBTQ issues, religion, and climate change.

== Ex-gay experiences ==
Because he adhered to Conservative Christian beliefs, Toscano spent seventeen years as part of the ex-gay movement attempting to alter his sexual orientation through conversion therapy and faith-based ex-gay programs. In addition to receiving pastoral counseling, conversion therapy, and discipleship training, he attended several ex-gay programs including Life Ministries in New York City (1983–1991) and the residential ex-gay program Love in Action in Memphis, Tennessee (July 1996-October 1998).

In 2003, Toscano also began to share the details of his own failed ex-gay odyssey, including the two years he endured at the Love in Action residential program in Memphis, Tennessee. Early that year, he returned to Memphis to premiere his one-person comedy

The conflict between his beliefs and his sexuality led him to consider suicide. He has stated that his experiences in Love in Action "felt like ... a biblically induced coma". He came out as a gay man in December 1998 and now presents his LGBTQ-affirming message through theatre and talks at universities, schools, conferences, churches, gay clubs, theaters and on-line through blogs and YouTube videos. In a 2009 interview Toscano explained, "I had an aversion to being gay because of the aversion I experienced in the world around me. Now I see that a gay orientation and gender diversity are normal phenomena in the natural world and throughout human history."

== Queer Bible Scholarship ==
As a Bible scholar, Toscano explores LGBTQ issues. He is especially known for highlighting gender non-conforming characters in the Bible. In his performance lecture, Transfigurations--Transgressing Gender in the Bible, he focuses on eunuchs and non-eunuchs who transgress and transcend gender. He first premiered Transfigurations in November 2007 and in March 2017 released the material as a film. The film was accepted for 2017 and 2018 LGBT film festivals including the 2017 Queer Kampala International Film Festival in December 2017. Moments before Toscano's film was scheduled to screen though, law enforcement agents raided the festival and shut it down. In response, Toscano offered the film for free on-line for a month and festival organizers arranged for a second showing in Kampala at an undisclosed location in January.

After seeing Toscano present the work at the 2010 Society of Biblical Literature Conference, Lynn Huber, Associate Professor of Religious Studies—New Testament and Early Christian History at Elon College commented, "As a biblical scholar I'm always a bit skeptical about dramatic interpretations of biblical texts, whether they will truly capture the complexity of the originals; however, Peterson's performances bring to light dimensions of the texts that many, even those of us who spend hours with the text on the page, fail to see. By bringing the stories and characters to life we're able to see the human-ness of the biblical narratives in all its gore and glory."

According to Teresa J Horsnby author of The Bible and American LGBT Interpretation, chapter 11 of the Oxford Handbook of the Bible in America "Peterson Toscano, a gay activist who stages and perform his biblical interpretations at universities and churches around the United States, focuses on narratives in which the primary actor could be read as 'other gendered.' In a performative series that depicts gendered others as the saviors of Israel, he tells the story of Hegai, Queen Esther's chief eunuch and his role in putting Esther in the position to save her people. Toscano also performs the narrative of an Ethiopian eunuch (Ebed Melech) who leads a "black op" unit to rescue the prophet Jeremiah from a cistern (Jer.38). One of Toscano's longest, and most provocative performance pieces, however, the story of Joseph, as told by his uncle Esau. Toscano tells the story in such a way that it is easy to imagine Joseph as a gay or possibly trans adolescent."

While he presents most of his Bible scholarship on stage or through his Transfigurations film, Toscano's writings about his Bible interpretations have appeared in the anthologies Gender Outlaws the Next Generation and Rainbow in the Word: LGBTQ Christian Memoirs. He also has contributed to REToday and Meetinghouse.xyz. His work is referenced in The Bible and the Transgender Experience and Retreating Forward: A Spiritual Practice with Transgender Persons.

With artist Joey Hartman-Dow, Peterson published some of his Bible scholarship in the illustrated story, The Amazing Adventures of the Afterbirth of Jesus.

== Performance work ==
Toscano performs original one-person comedies that often draw on his own experiences. In his plays he incorporates Biblical texts, historical events, interviews he has conducted, and poetry. Toscano's performance style incorporates character acting, comedy, storytelling, and drama. He has written about the tension in his work that comes from being an artist, activist, and scholar. He also has written about the influence Quakerism has had on his performance work.

In February 2003, Toscano premiered his one-man satire Time in the Homo No Mo Halfway House in Memphis, TN and from that time until he retired it in February 2008, he performed it and spoke about the potential dangers of conversion therapy at venues throughout North America, in Sweden, Denmark, the UK, Cameroon, and South Africa. Doin' Time in the Homo No Mo Halfway House is now available on DVD.

Toscano's other works include Queer 101—Now I Know My gAy,B,Cs, How the Indians Discovered Columbus, Footprints—An Inspirational Comedy, The Re-Education of George W. Bush, and Transfigurations—Transgressing Gender in the Bible. In 2014 he shifted his focus and began to produce web content and performances that consider queer responses to climate change.

He has presented at universities in North America including American University, Rice University, Haverford College, Colgate University, McGill University, University of British Columbia, Earlham College, University of Illinois, Bard College and James Madison University. In the UK he has presented at several universities including University of Cambridge, University of York, University of Bradford, Bishop Grosseteste University College and University of Southampton. He has been featured at many conferences including Society of Biblical Literature, Lambeth Conference (2008), Gender Odyssey, Coalition of Essential Schools Conference, California Transgender Leadership Summit, True Colors Conference, Women's History Conference at Sarah Lawrence College, Lavender Language Conference, Friends General Conference, and International Conference on Language, Literature and Identity at University of Yaounde, Cameroon.

== Activism ==
In June 2005 the Queer Action Coalition invited Toscano to join them for a series of protests outside the Love in Action facility in Memphis, Tennessee. Zach Stark, a 16-year-old boy, was placed against his will into Refuge, Love in Action's program for youth. Before he entered, he sent out a MySpace bulletin alerting his friends that he will be forced to receive conversion therapy. The state of Tennessee launched a series of investigations, and the protests received international news coverage. In June 2007, Love in Action discontinued Refuge.

In April 2007, together with Christine Bakke, Toscano launched Beyond Ex-Gay, an on-line support group for people who are now ex-ex-gay. Toscano also helped organize the Ex-Gay Survivor Conference held June 28 to July 1, 2007, in Irvine, California. As part of the conference three former Exodus ex-gay leaders came forward to issue a public apology for their roles in promoting and providing conversion therapy.

In response to a Memphis-area ex-gay conference organized by Colorado Springs-based Focus on the Family, in February 2008, Toscano along with Christine Bakke and other ex-ex-gays in the Mid-South and throughout the country organized a response called Deconstructing the Ex-Gay Myth—A Weekend of Art and Action. Toscano shared some of his story in the local media and presented two of his plays. He also led workshops at an ex-gay survivor gathering.

Toscano helped organize an international conference held in Catalonia on May 30, 2008, at the University of Barcelona. The conference, Teràpies reparatives per l'homosexualitat—Perquè existeixen i quins perills impliquen (Gay to Straight Therapies—The reasons they exist and their potential harm) highlighted the potential dangers of conversion therapy and gave mental health professionals, scholars, clergy and concerned citizens the opportunity to hear from people directly affected by these therapies as well as experts in the field of psychology.

As a grand marshal of the Mid-South Pride parade, Toscano returned to Memphis in June 2008, where he had been a resident of the Love in Action program 10 years earlier. In July 2008 Toscano presented his plays The Re-Education of George W. Bush and Transfigurations-Transgressing Gender in the Bible in Malta where he also spoke out about conversion therapy.

He has served as an outspoken critic of the ex-gay movement in the UK. In August 2006 at the Greenbelt Festival he presented a talk about his own ex-gay experiences and personal journey. In July 2008 he offered two talks at the Lambeth Conference in Kent where he discussed being "gay and Christian" and about the dangers of conversion therapy. In an article for the British newspaper The Times Toscano spoke of the ex-gay movement in Great Britain: "'It is a far more subtle seduction over here,' he says. Toscano claims that therapists in Britain – who he says tried to exorcise his gay demons in Kidderminster, in the West Midlands – nearly drove him to suicide."

In December 2008 Toscano traveled to South Africa and highlighted the potential dangers in receiving conversion therapy. He made his South African premiere on January 7, 2009 in Cape Town.

An active member of the Religious Society of Friends, Toscano states that his non-violent approach in his work seeks to expose injustice without attacking anti-gay activists. He believes that gay community needs to do more to accept LGBT people of faith, and by doing so will help to lessen the popularity of conversion therapy groups. He told news website Salon.com, "If we took better care of our own, we would put these programs out of business."

== Climate work ==
Beginning in September 2014, Toscano shifted his public focus to spreading awareness about climate change. Although not an environmentalist, he was motivated to become a climate advocate because of his concerns about human rights and social justice. He has also joked that his Italian-American heritage has played a role too: "On a warmer planet where there's more drought, there will be more crop failure, including potentially, failures of wheat production, leading to shortages of pasta. I was like, wait, what?" Though Toscano has been presenting about climate change since September 2014, his realization of needing to take action - also known as his "apastalypse" - occurred in 2012.

Toscano created five presentations addressing climate change: Everything Is Connected-A Collection Of Stories-Most Weird, Many True; Does This Apocalypse Make Me Look Fat?; A Queer Response To Climate Change; Climate Change: What's Faith Got To Do With It?; and There's Something Funny About Climate Change. In all of this work, Toscano takes controversial and current topics "and is able to present them in a way that is accessible. One of the best things his talks are able to do is focus on the intersections of people's identities and social justice issues." He is known for his inspirational last words in performances: "During times of crisis, people do extraordinary things... extraordinary, kind, loving, caring things. You see how communities come together to look after each other. How can we come up with lasting change that's not going to hurt communities, but actually foster a better world?"

Since began addressing climate work starting in 2014, he has performed at various colleges and venues around North America and Europe, including the Greenbelt Festival, Penn State University, Susquehanna University, and Villanova University. Peterson has been featured in Yale Climate Connections, The Daily Collegian, and The Campus for various higher education performances. In October 2017 Toscano presented A Queer Response to Climate Change—What Would Walt Whitman Do? In an interview with NYU's Washington Square News, Toscano spoke about the role of comedy in taking on climate change and LGBTQ responses to climate change. "With climate change, we're all on the same boat together, but we're not all on the same deck. We know people have different experiences of the world. I think it's also important from a queer family values perspective that we're affected by climate change differently than other people. LGBTQ seniors, who are often more isolated than other seniors, may not have people checking in on them during a heat wave or hurricane. LGBTQ homeless youth, who may not feel welcome at shelters, need somewhere to go during big storms. We need to make sure we will survive these storms and that our people have healthy, strong lives."

Toscano has spoken at university sustainability events including the 2017 Southeastern EcoRep Conference and the New York Coalition for Sustainability in Higher Education. and at Citizens' Climate Lobby conferences, including the Mid-Atlantic regional conference in Philadelphia and the international conference in Washington DC. He hosts the monthly podcast Citizens' Climate Radio where he "highlight[s] people's stories, [celebrates CCL members'] successes, and together [shares] strategies for talking about climate change." After the election of Donald Trump, in addition to his comic performance work he began exploring Conservative responses to climate change.

Toscano also is a volunteer lobbyist for Citizens' Climate Lobby (CCL) and the co-leader of the Susquehanna Valley CCL Chapter.

== Media ==
Toscano was featured in the second season of the Be Real program on Logo TV, and has appeared on several TV and radio programs including the Tyra Banks Show, the Montel Williams Show, Faith Under Fire, PBS In the Life, PRI To the Point, Connecticut Public Radio Where We Live (PRNDI Award-winning episode), BBC Radio Ulster Sunday Sequence, Radio Lab, and BBC World Service Reporting Religion.

In addition to print, television and radio, Toscano appears in various documentaries including the 2005 film Fish Can't Fly, which explores the conflict that many lesbians and gays have had with their Christian faith, and the 2008 Canadian documentary Cure for Love. He appears in and is associate producer for the 2011 film This is What Love in Action Looks Like.

Toscano was the co-host of the podcast Queer and Queerer with Zack Ford, LGBTQ editor at Think Progress. In 2014 Toscano premiered the Climate Stew podcast, which used comedy and storytelling to address climate change. He currently produces and hosts Citizens Climate Radio.

== Personal ==
Peterson Toscano lives in Pretoria, South Africa, with his husband, South African writer Glen Retief.
