= Günter Baum =

German activist

Günter Baum (born 1960) is an openly gay man, who founded two Christian ministries in Germany.

The first organization which Baum founded was Wüstenstrom, which is part of the ex-gay movement. The organization's program was originally based on the U.S. program Desert Stream Ministries, though the group has since changed its philosophy. Eventually, Baum left "Wüstenstrom".

Baum later founded an organization called Zwischenraum. Zwischenraum is not part of the ex-gay movement, and associates do not attempt to change the sexual orientation of anyone. Instead, Zwischenraum accepts LGBT people as they are, and helps LGBT people who hold evangelical theological beliefs to reconcile these two potentially conflicting parts of their identities.

Today, Baum lives as an openly gay man near Basel, Switzerland.

== See also ==
- Ex-ex-gay
