= Homosexuals Anonymous =

Anti-LGBT Christian fundamentalist group

- Founded: 1980
- Founder: Colin Cook, Douglas McIntyre
- Location: Houston, Texas, U.S.
- Key people: Douglas McIntyre, National Director
- Website: ha-fs.org

Homosexuals Anonymous (HA) is an ex-gay group which practices conversion therapy and describes itself as "a fellowship of men and women, who through their common emotional experience, have chosen to help each other live in freedom from homosexuality". HA regards homosexual orientation as "sexual brokeness" that may be "healed" through faith in Jesus Christ. In common with other Christian fundamentalist groups, HA regards heterosexuality as "the universal creation-norm". This approach has been criticized for stressing that a person must renounce homosexuality to be a Christian, because there is no valid scientific evidence that sexual orientation can be changed.

Christopher Melilo, Colin Cook and Douglas McIntyre, who all claimed to have struggled with same-sex attractions, founded HA in 1980 with financial support from the Seventh-day Adventist denomination. HA uses a 14-step program developed by Cook, based on his own experiences. Cook resigned in 1986 following a scandal involving him allegedly having sex with twelve out of fourteen male clients interviewed from 1980 to 1986.

== History ==
HA was founded in 1980 by Colin Cook (a Seventh-day Adventist pastor who was defrocked in 1974 for having sex with a man in his church) and ex-gay Douglas McIntyre. Cook founded the Quest Learning Center in Reading, Pennsylvania, as a ministry of the Seventh-day Adventist Church to "help people find freedom from homosexuality". HA was one of seven programs offered by Quest, and people came from around the US seeking assistance from Cook. Cook developed the 14-step program used by HA, modifying five of the standard twelve steps from the Alcoholics Anonymous program and basing the other nine on his personal experience. HA was supported by $47,000 in annual support from the Adventist Church, plus fees paid for treatment. McIntyre (who, when growing up, identified as gay) said he founded HA based on his belief that "homosexuality is not something you're born with, that it's a spin-off of a trauma that occurs during childhood". He attributes abuse at the ages of three and four, and molestation at the age of five, as having contributed to his homosexual attraction.

Rumours of sexual misconduct by Cook came to light in 1986 when Ron Lawson, a gay Adventist and Professor of Sociology at Queens College, New York, began an investigation by interviewing Cook's former clients and writing a letter to church officials outlining his indiscretions. Lawson interviewed 14 individuals counselled by Cook as part of the HA program; none reported any change in sexual orientation as a consequence of HA, and all but two reported having sex with Cook. Cook resigned from HA and shut down Quest; the Adventists withdrew their funding support. With Cook's departure, McIntyre took over as executive director of HA.

Counseling sessions with Cook included giving his clients nude massages, ostensibly to desensitize them to male–male contact and homosexual desires; however, this was counter-productive since counselees began having sexual encounters with each other. Cook admitted in a 1987 interview that he "fell into the delusion" that such actions were a legitimate part of his HA counseling activities, stating: "I allowed myself to hug and hold my counselees thinking I was helping them... But I needed it more than they did." Psychiatrist Ralph Blair in his 1982 monograph Ex-Gay describes practitioners of sexual orientation conversion through religion as often being "individuals deeply troubled about their own sexual orientation, or whose own sexual conversion is incomplete". Blair reports a host of problems with such counselors, including the sexual abuse of clients; Haldeman describes Cook as "the most notable of such ministers". Cook himself also admitted to "occasional falls" before (and throughout) his marriage.

Despite his 1974 defrocking and the 1986 revelations of his client abuse, Cook remains dedicated to the belief that homosexuality can be changed. In 1993 he moved to Colorado and returned to counseling, which ended in 1995 when The Denver Post reported Cook was engaging in phone sex and asking "patients to bring homosexual pornography to sessions so that he could help desensitize them against it". As recently as 2007, Cook has still been promoting the ability to "heal homosexuals". Under McIntyre, HA has also taken on more political advocacy. In 2009 he led a conference held in Kenya promoting the ex-gay movement, controversial as an example of ex-gay advocacy events held in Africa which are followed by incidents of homophobic violence.

== Organization ==
The headquarters of Homosexuals Anonymous is in Houston, Texas. As of June 2009, the organization has chapters in the United States, Germany, New Zealand and El Salvador. HA is a member of the Positive Alternatives to Homosexuality (PATH) group. HA is affiliated with JASON Ministries, headquartered in Germany. It publishes a newsletter and web site and organizes a "Homosexuals Anonymous Annual Conference".

== Program ==
The HA program relies on Christian belief to effect sexual orientation change. Similar to Alcoholics Anonymous, the change takes place over a lifetime, according to HA. Local chapters conduct meetings at regular intervals where members provide fellowship and support to one another. Unlike AA's 12-step program, HA has 14 steps which are used by about 50 chapters of HA throughout North America. Nine of the steps were based on the experiences of founder Cook, while the other five are adaptations of AA steps. One analysis of the 14 steps commented on the "alleged generosity" of the HA approach, noting that while both approaches emphasize avoidance of undesired behaviors, "AA groups accept the person along with their problems, [whereas] Homosexuals Anonymous stresses that the person is guilty of the sin of homosexuality, must admit it, renounce it, and then accept heterosexuality as a necessary condition to becoming a Christian." According to gay affirmative psychotherapists Kathleen Ritter and Anthony Terndrup, ex-gay organizations like Exodus International and Parents and Friends of Ex-Gays and Gays (PFOX) use this adapted model developed by HA.

== Effectiveness ==
The organization cites several cases where it claims people have changed their sexual orientation. Regarding Lawson's 1986 findings, the Los Angeles Times reported that counselees' reactions to the Cook revelations followed a common pattern: "a loss of faith, loss of trust in other human beings, and a lack of motivation to get on with their lives". In addition, many of the counselees stayed in Reading, "unwilling or unable to go home to families who expected them to be changed".

Wayne Besen states that former HA clients have reported that the program is ineffective. Besen quotes a former client: "One thing that really clued me in was [meeting] with my sponsor every week and hearing him talk about his struggles and talking to other people in the group, and there were people in that group who had been going to HA for four, five, six, seven years and they seemed to be at the exact same spot I was. I didn't see any graduates. I saw people that were still there, that hadn't changed. They were still struggling. ... I don't know anybody from my ex-gay group ... who claims to be ex-gay now."

== Criticism ==
One critic of HA is Cindi Love, the executive director of Soulforce, who states that "the message that homosexuality can be 'repaired' doesn't just ruin lives – it ends them". She describes the expansion of ex-gay organizations around the world as "rearing [their] ugly heads," specifically citing HA's expansion into El Salvador, New Zealand, and Germany, and criticising HA executive director McIntyre's Kenyan conference.

Wayne Besen, former spokesperson for the Human Rights Campaign and founder of Truth Wins Out, has argued that the LGBT community needs to challenge the propaganda presented at ex-gay events including those run by HA. He also advocates covert operations against HA and other ex-gay ministries in an attempt to "catch ex-gay leaders engaging in not so ex-gay behavior", though such attempts to discredit the industry are controversial even within the LGBT community. Besen has accused HA of re-writing history, omitting details of Cook's past from its web site. While "reading the group's Web page, one would think that Cook was a smashing success and paragon of heterosexuality," he writes. Haldeman has described the response of the Seventh-day Adventist Church to the 1986 Cook revelations as a cover-up whilst Lawson titled his 1987 presentation to the annual convention of the American Sociological Association: Scandal in the Adventist-funded program to 'heal' homosexuals: Failure, sexual exploitation, official silence, and attempts to rehabilitate the exploiter and his methods. In Julie Scott Jones' study of Christian fundamentalism, Being the Chosen, HA, Exodus International and NARTH are described as organizations that "particularly target teenagers' burgeoning sexuality, and feed into a wider fundamentalist view that all forms of 'sexual immorality' are destroying the moral fabric of the nation".

== See also ==
- Christianity and homosexuality
- Ex-Ex-Gay
- Courage International
- GLAAD
- Homophobia
- Matthew Shepard Foundation
- Persecution of Homosexuals in Nazi Germany
- Recovering from Religion
- The Trevor Project
