= Douglas McIntyre =

Douglas McIntyre may refer to:

- Douglas McIntyre (Homosexuals Anonymous), national director of Homosexuals Anonymous
- Mike McIntyre (Douglas Carmichael McIntyre II, born 1956), American attorney and politician
- Doug McIntyre (Douglas McIntyre, born 1957), American radio show host, radio and television producer, writer
