= Restored Hope Network =

American gay-straight conversion organization

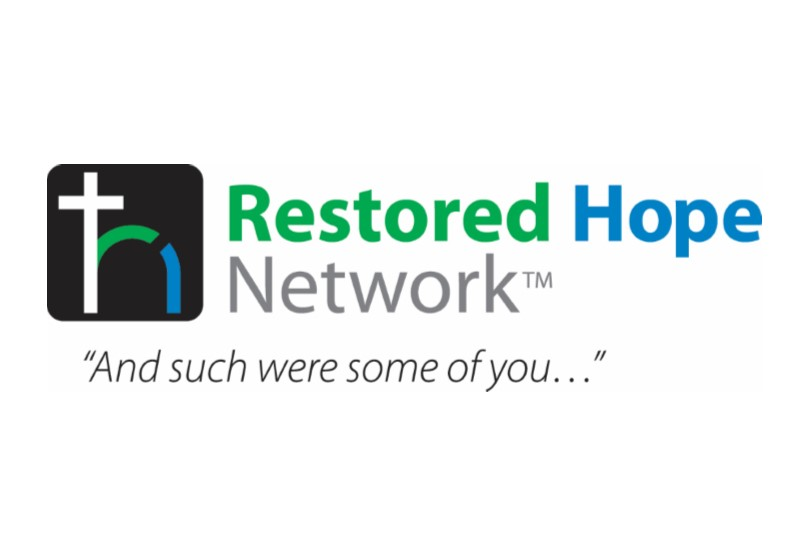
- Founded: 2012
- Type: 501c3 nonprofit
- Tax ID no.: 46-0739644 (EIN)
- Headquarters: Milwaukie, Oregon
- Services: Network of ministries and support groups
- Website: restoredhopenetwork.com

Restored Hope Network is an American ex-gay network of interdenominational Christian ministries that advocates for conversion therapy. Founded in 2012, Restored Hope Network is opposed to same-sex marriage and LGBTQ rights; it has been described as the "new Exodus International" by Truth Wins Out.

== History ==
The organization was founded in Sacramento in 2012. Its Board of References consists of members from ex-gay organizations, including James Dobson, Albert Mohler and Christopher West.

While Restored Hope Network considers the term conversion therapy to be "an ideological term used by the LGBTQ activist community", the network ultimately supports the process of conversion therapy and holds annual conferences across the United States that offer advice for families with LGBT relatives and provide outreach support to churches.

National health organizations around the world have uniformly denounced and criticized sexual orientation and gender identity change efforts. Studies made by the American Medical Association have found that 42% of those subjected to conversion therapy attempted suicide, compared to 5% of those not subjected to these practices.

Other mainstream health organizations that are critical of conversion therapy include: the American Psychiatric Association, the American Psychological Association, the American Association for Marriage and Family Therapy, the American Counseling Association, the National Association of Social Workers, the American Academy of Pediatrics, the National Association of School Psychologists, and the American Academy of Physician Assistants.

== See also ==
- Courage International
- Ex-ex-gay
- Exodus International
- GLAAD
- Homophobia
- Homosexuality and Christianity
- Joel 2:25 International
- JONAH
- Matthew Shepard Foundation
- Persecution of homosexuals in Nazi Germany
- Recovering from Religion
- The Trevor Project
