= Exodus Global Alliance =

- Formation: 2004
- Type: Advocacy of Christian morality
- Purpose: Seeks to 'cure' homosexuality in individuals with a lifestyle centered on faith in Christ and Christianity.
- Headquarters: Michigan, United States
- Region served: International
- Website: www.exodusglobalalliance.org

Exodus Global Alliance is an American Christian organization that seeks to advocate ex-gay movements by promoting the widely discredited idea that gay people can change their homosexuality, claiming, in their own words, to "help bring healing and freedom to people struggling with homosexual behaviour".

== History ==
Exodus Global Alliance was formed out of Exodus International in 2004. Exodus International pulled out of Exodus Global Alliance on 28 May 2013.
