= John Paulk =

American activist

John Paulk (born April 13, 1963) is an American activist who, from 1998 to 2003, was an advocate of the ex-gay movement and conversion therapy. In April 2013, Paulk disavowed his belief in gay conversion therapy and issued a formal apology for his role as an advocate of the movement.

He founded and led the ministry Love Won Out, which was launched by the organization Focus on the Family. From 1998 to 2003, he was chairman of the board of Exodus International North America. His autobiography, Not Afraid to Change (1998), discussed his sexuality and attempts to change his same-sex desires. Later in 1998, after it was revealed that Paulk had attended a gay bar, both organizations punished him, but he remained with Focus on the Family until 2003. He resigned as Exodus board chairman but continued his elected position until his term was completed. In 2005, Paulk opened a catering business in Portland, Oregon.

By 2013, his wife Anne Paulk had divorced him and he no longer supported the ex-gay movement and efforts to attempt to change individuals' sexual orientation

Paulk was featured in the 2021 documentary film Pray Away.

== Biography ==
A native of Columbus, Ohio, Paulk attended Fort Hayes High School for the Performing Arts and The Ohio State University, where he majored in music/voice. During the late 1980s, Paulk managed Cocolat, a San Francisco patisserie owned by Alice Medrich.

Paulk claimed that he overcame his homosexuality following his conversion to Christianity, through a combination of counseling, groups, prayer, and his relationship with God. He identified himself as a heterosexual. Paulk's wife, Anne, also identified as ex-gay. John Paulk co-wrote the books Not Afraid to Change with Tony Marko and Love Won Out with Anne Paulk.

== Career ==
Paulk became involved with Focus on the Family, where he was manager of the organization's Homosexuality and Gender Division. In August 1995, Paulk was elected chairman of the board of Exodus International North America for a three-year term. He was subsequently re-elected to a second three-year term in 1998. As an employee of Focus on the Family, Paulk toured the United States, speaking of his conversions at Love Won Out conferences. Paulk and his wife became the faces promoting Exodus ministries in major daily newspaper full-page ads. The couple appeared on the cover of Newsweek (August 1998), when the publication covered Exodus and the ex-gay movement. That year, Christian right groups including the Family Research Council and the American Family Association spent $600,000 on advertising promoting conversion therapy.

Paulk left "ex-gay" ministry work in 2003 and moved to Portland, Oregon, with his wife and family. The couple started a catering business in 2005, and he appeared regularly in cooking segments on Portland television. In February 2015, Paulk appeared on the Food Network program Cutthroat Kitchen, hosted by Alton Brown. Paulk came in second place.

== Washington, D.C. incident ==
On September 19, 2000, while on a speaking tour, Paulk was seen sitting inside at the Washington, D.C. gay bar Mr. P's. A patron recognized him and contacted Wayne Besen of the Human Rights Campaign, Truth Wins Out, and other gay political action organizations. When Besen arrived at the bar 40 minutes later and confronted Paulk, Paulk denied that he was John Paulk, instead insisting he was "John Clint". Upon exiting the bar, Paulk's picture was taken as evidence that he had been in the bar. When confronted by Besen about the incident and the photographs, Paulk admitted being in the bar, but stated that he didn't know that it was a gay bar, and he had simply stopped in for a moment to use the restroom. However, eyewitnesses reported that Paulk stayed for more than an hour, flirted with other men, and—when questioned about his sexuality—said that he was gay.

Paulk was called back to Focus on the Family headquarters and questioned by James Dobson. At first, Paulk reportedly avoided giving a direct answer about the incident; however, he later confessed that he had been in the bar for the purpose of finding connection with other men. Paulk reduced his activities for six months and then resumed his position as manager of the Homosexuality and Gender Division of Focus on the Family.

An Exodus press release soon followed:

John's actions represent a serious lapse in sound judgment. His decision to enter a gay establishment for any reason opens him up to all kinds of speculation by both other Exodus leaders and also the gay community.

The incident received national headlines in newspapers and news magazines. Paulk remained in his position as manager of the Homosexuality and Gender Department until choosing to leave that position in 2003.

== Formal apology ==
In April 2013, Paulk disavowed his belief in gay reparative therapy, announcing that he does not see himself as "ex-gay" and believes that reparative therapy is both futile and harmful. He announced that his marriage was ending and he issued a formal apology for his role as an advocate of the movement.

== Media appearances ==
Paulk has appeared in various media throughout his career, reflecting both his advocacy work and later public life.

=== Television ===
- July 20, 1993 — Appeared alongside Anne Paulk on The Oprah Winfrey Show, discussing their experiences as part of the ex-gay movement.
- October 15, 1995 — Appeared alongside Anne Paulk on 60 Minutes, in the segment "The Conversion" exploring the ex-gay movement.
- November 14, 1997 — Appeared alongside Anne Paulk on The Jerry Springer Show, in an episode titled "I Was Gay, Now I'm Not".
- February 4, 2015 — Contestant on the Food Network program Cutthroat Kitchen, episode "The Trouble with Truffles"; finished in second place.

=== Film ===
- August 3, 2021 — Appeared as himself in the Netflix documentary film Pray Away, which examines the history and impact of the ex-gay movement.

=== Podcast ===
- May 2026 — Featured as the subject and co-contributor of the six-part series Atonement: The John Paulk Story, produced by iHeartMedia and Goldhawk Productions. The series won Gold in the Best Sex & Relationships Podcast category at the British Podcast Awards 2026.

== See also ==
- List of LGBT people from Portland, Oregon
