= Christine Bakke =

American LGBT rights activist

Christine Bakke (born June 3, 1971) is an American LGBT rights activist. Bakke spent four years in the ex-gay movement attempting to alter her sexual orientation through conversion therapy. In addition to receiving pastoral counseling and discipleship training, she attended ex-gay programs, including Where Grace Abounds in Denver, CO and the Living Waters Program.

In April 2007, along with gay performance activist Peterson Toscano, Bakke co-founded Beyond Ex-Gay. In May 2007, Glamour Magazine featured Bakke's experience as an ex-gay survivor, or ex-ex-gay. She has also appeared on ABC's Good Morning America, and Colorado Public Radio.

Bakke participated in the Ex-Gay Survivor Conference held June 29-July 1, 2007 in Irvine, CA and took part in Survivor Initiative, a series of press conferences sponsored by Soulforce, whereby former ex-gays shared their experiences with the public as a witness and a warning about the dangers of the ex-gay movement. For the Survivor Initiative, Bakke designed original collages for each of the speakers to present.

== See also ==
- Queer theology
