= Sam Brinton =

American nuclear waste disposal expert

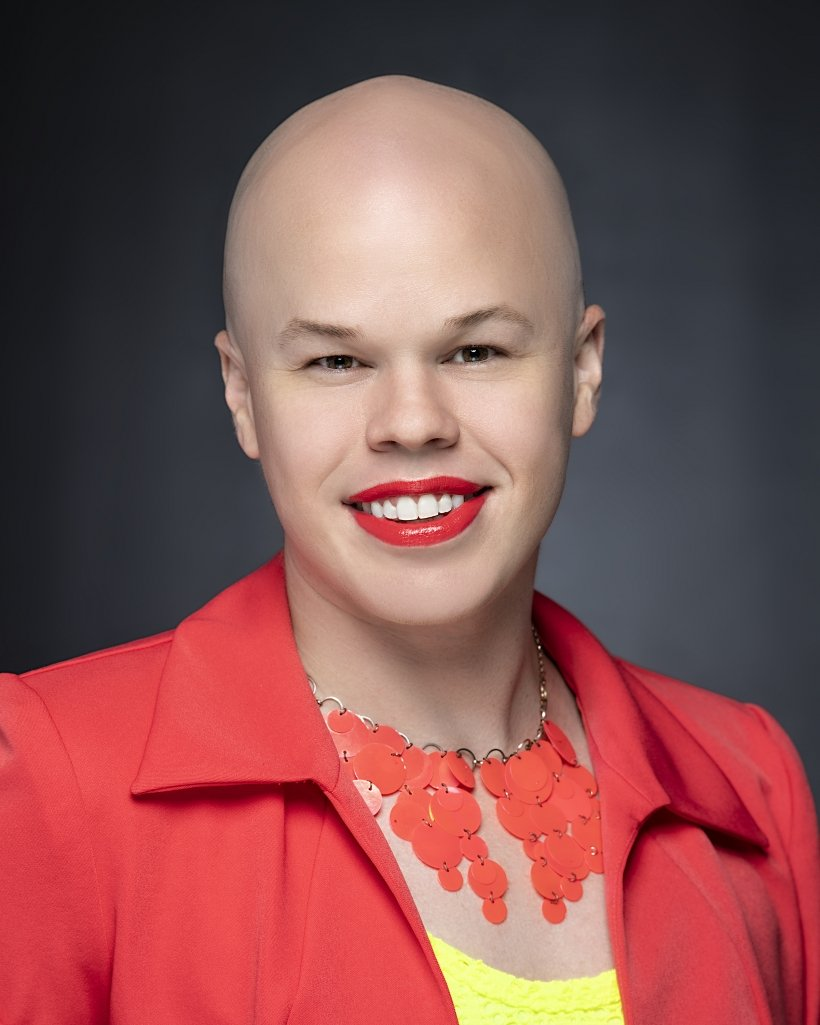
- Brinton in 2022
- Born: Samuel Otis Brinton; 1986 or 1987 (age 38–39)
- Education: Kansas State University (BS); Massachusetts Institute of Technology (MS)

Samuel Otis Brinton (born 1986 or 1987) is an American nuclear engineer and LGBTQ activist. They served as the deputy assistant secretary of Spent Fuel and Waste Disposition in the Office of Nuclear Energy from June to December 2022. Brinton was dismissed by the Office of Nuclear Energy after being charged with luggage theft on three occasions.

Brinton gained media attention in 2010 for their reported experience of conversion therapy, later testifying at the United Nations on the subject in 2014. Gay activist Wayne Besen was skeptical about their account, alleging inconsistencies.

Brinton was the first openly genderfluid individual in federal government leadership, and uses they/them pronouns.

== Early life and education ==
Brinton was raised in Perry, Iowa, and is the child of two Southern Baptist missionaries. Brinton came out as bisexual to their parents in the early 2000s. According to Brinton, their parents disapproved of Brinton's attraction to a male friend from school and sent the then-middle school student for conversion therapy, an experience Brinton later described as "barbaric" and "painful" in a New York Times op-ed. During one particularly extreme conversion therapy session, Brinton described being bound to a table while ice, heat, and electricity were applied to their body, all while being forced to watch film clips of gay intimacy.

Brinton has stated that parental physical abuse also became far more common as they began to express their identity. Eventually, Brinton said that after it was clear that conversion therapy had not affected their sexuality, they were effectively disowned by their parents, with their father threatening to shoot Brinton in the head if Brinton ever returned home.

Journalist and gay activist Wayne Besen has expressed skepticism about Brinton's description of experiencing conversion therapy in childhood. Besen noted inconsistencies in Brinton's retelling of events, such as Brinton not being able to remember the therapist's name, despite saying he had two years of sessions with him. In the aftermath of the 2022 allegations of luggage theft against Brinton, Besen reiterated his concerns and accused some people and groups of failing to heed "clear warning signs" and accepting Brinton's recounting of experiences without confirming their veracity as "sloppy, ethically negligent, and shockingly unprofessional" behavior.

In 2006, Brinton graduated from Perry High School and in 2011 from Kansas State University with a Bachelor of Science degree in mechanical engineering with a nuclear engineering focus and vocal music. In 2010, while attending the university, Brinton organized its first pride march and helped found Kansas' first LGBTQ resource center.

In 2013, they graduated from the Massachusetts Institute of Technology with a dual Master of Science degree in nuclear science and engineering (technology and policy program).

While at MIT, Brinton cofounded Stand with Science, a national advocacy network aiming to protect federal research funding, which in 2012 under their leadership petitioned Congress with over 10,000 signatories. In 2014, it was represented in 30 colleges and universities. In 2014, Brinton was its executive director and had the same role in the National Science Policy Group. Brinton is a past president of MIT's Science Policy Initiative.

== LGBTQ activism ==
In November 2014, identifying as a "survivor" of conversion therapy, Brinton was the first such individual to testify before the United Nations Convention Against Torture regarding such experiences. Brinton was the advisory committee co-chair of the National Center for Lesbian Rights' #BornPerfect campaign and held the position until at least September 2015. They were one of three grand marshals of the 2015 Boston Pride Parade.

In 2016, Brinton founded the #50Bills50States campaign, with the goal of prohibiting the pseudoscientific practice of conversion therapy throughout the U.S.

In 2016 and 2018, Brinton was the principal officer of the Washington, D.C. chapter of the Sisters of Perpetual Indulgence, an LGBTQ charity and human rights group. At events, such as the organization's 40th anniversary, they performed in drag under the name "Sister Ray Dee O'Active".

Between 2017 and 2020, Brinton was the head of advocacy and government affairs at the non-profit LGBTQ youth suicide prevention organization The Trevor Project.

== Career ==
In 2016, Brinton was a senior policy analyst for the Bipartisan Policy Center, lobbying for updated regulations to make it possible for nuclear waste to be used to power advanced nuclear reactors. In February 2020, the website of Deep Isolation, a Berkeley, California, nuclear waste storage and disposal company, listed Brinton as Director of Legislative Affairs and in May 2022 as Director of Global Political Strategy. In 2022, Brinton's profile at the Department of Energy (DOE) indicated previous work with the Breakthrough Institute, the Clean Air Task Force, and Third Way.

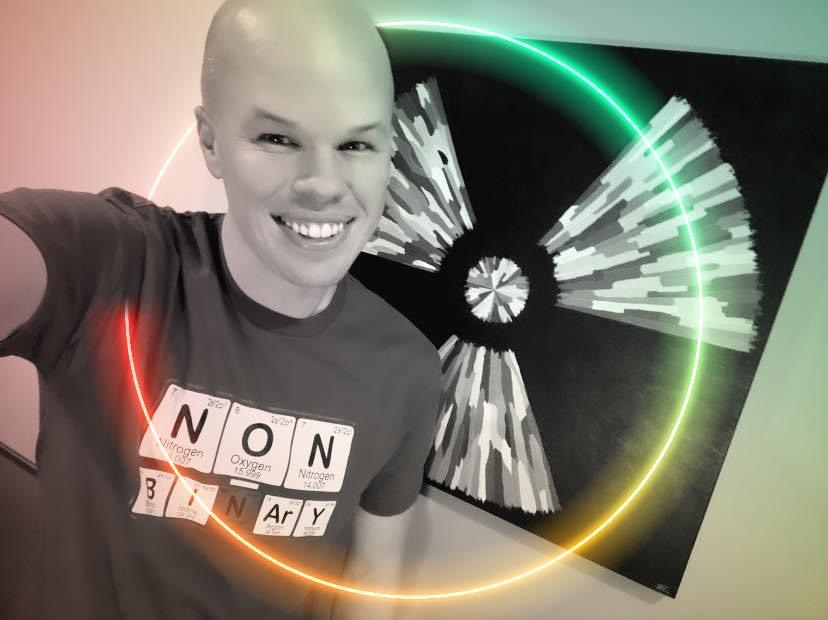
Brinton in 2022

In 2022, they became deputy assistant secretary for spent fuel and waste disposition in DOE's Office of Nuclear Energy, serving in the Office of Spent Fuel and Waste Disposition. South Florida Gay News reported that, according to Brinton, while they were "welcomed with open arms" at all levels of the organization, others reacted to their appointment with hatred and disgust, some making death threats against them.

In February 2022, an unidentified Department of Energy employee filed allegations of hiring malpractice with the Office of the Inspector General due to concern regarding Brinton's qualifications for a Senior Executive Service (SES) level position, i.e. "the class of federal career officials who rank just below top presidential appointees in seniority".

Brinton in October 2022 said they supported using interim siting for radioactive waste to determine which sites and storage methods are best suited for future permanent repositories.

== Luggage thefts ==
In November 2022, Brinton was placed on leave by the Department of Energy after being charged with theft of luggage at an airport. On December 12, 2022, after a second similar charge for a July incident, a Department of Energy spokesperson confirmed that Brinton was no longer a DOE employee. Brinton was succeeded by acting deputy assistant secretary Kim Petry.

A July 2022 incident resulted in a second arrest warrant, issued on December 8, 2022, for grand larceny after investigators matched Brinton to security camera footage of the theft at Harry Reid International Airport in Las Vegas. The case had been closed for lack of an identifiable suspect until news broke about Brinton's Minneapolis arrest. In April 2023, Brinton pleaded no contest to stealing the Las Vegas luggage, was sentenced to pay $3,670.74 in restitution for the stolen luggage and clothes, and was given a suspended jail term of 180 days.

Also in 2022, Brinton was charged with felony theft after allegedly stealing a woman's suitcase from a Minneapolis–Saint Paul International Airport baggage carousel on September 16. If they had been convicted, these charges could have carried a five-year sentence. On February 15, 2023, Brinton appeared in court in Hennepin County, Minnesota, and was released without bail. In April 2023, they entered an adult diversion program that required them to undergo a mental health evaluation, return stolen property, and do community service.

In February 2023, the Tanzanian fashion designer Asya Khamsin said she had recognized her custom-designed clothing, lost in a March 2018 airline luggage disappearance at Ronald Reagan Washington National Airport in Washington, D.C., being worn by Brinton in photos. She filed a police report in Houston after seeing the photos, and on May 17, 2023, Brinton's home was searched and Brinton was arrested by the Metropolitan Washington Airports Authority; the expected charge was grand larceny.

The National Review reported in July 2024 that Brinton pled guilty to misdemeanor petit larceny in Virginia as part of a plea deal, resulting in no jail time. A civil case filed by Khamsin in Maryland was settled after Brinton paid her compensation and wrote an apology letter which Khamsin considered "quite personal, sensitive, sincere, and heartfelt".

== Personal life ==
Brinton is bisexual and uses they/them pronouns. According to a 2017 Washington Blade local events article, Brinton resided in Washington, D.C., was a singer in the Gay Men's Chorus of Washington, D.C., and married Kevin Rieck in 2019.

== Publications ==
- Brinton, Samuel; Tokuhiro, Akira (2008). "An Initial Study on Modeling the United States Thermal Fuel Cycle Mass Flow Using Vensim". 16th International Conference on Nuclear Engineering, Volume 2: Fuel Cycle and High Level Waste Management; Computational Fluid Dynamics, Neutronics Methods and Coupled Codes; Student Paper Competition. ASME. pp. 867–876. doi:10.1115/ICONE16-48571. ISBN 978-0-7918-4815-9.
- Brinton, Samuel; Passerini, Stefano; Kazimi, Mujid (June 2013). "Nuclear Fuel Cycle Analysis and Optimization with the Code for Advanced Fuel Cycles Assessment (CAFCA)". Transactions of the American Nuclear Society. 108 (1): 131–133.
- Brinton, Samuel; Kazimi, Mujid (October 2013). "A nuclear fuel cycle system dynamic model for spent fuel storage options". Energy Conversion and Management. 74: 558–561. Bibcode:2013ECM....74..558B. doi:10.1016/j.enconman.2013.03.041.
