= Glen Retief =

South African writer

Glen Retief is a South African writer who won a Lambda Literary Award in 2012 for his memoir The Jack Bank: A Memoir of a South African Childhood. The Jack Bank was also an Africa Book Club Book of 2011.

Retief grew up in South Africa's Kruger National Park, where his father was a park warden. He later attended a boarding school before studying English at the University of Cape Town. As an anti-apartheid and LGBT rights activist in the late 1980s and early 1990s, he was part of the group that successfully lobbied for sexual orientation to be included in the Constitution of South Africa as a prohibited grounds of discrimination. His essay "Keeping Sodom Out of the Laager" appeared in Defiant Desire, an influential anthology of South African LGBT writing published in 1996.

He currently lives in Pretoria, South Africa, with his husband, American performance artist and Bible scholar Peterson Toscano, and teaches English literature and creative writing at Susquehanna University.
