= Joel 2:25 International =

Joel 2:25 International, Inc.
- "I will restore to you the years which the swarming locust has eaten, the hopper, the destroyer, and the cutter." - Joel 2:25
- Founded: 2013
- Type: Nonprofit
- Tax ID no.: 46-4342662 (EIN)
- Headquarters: P.O. Box 795471 Dallas, Texas 75379
- Website: www.joel225.org

Joel 2:25 International, Inc. ("Joel 2:25") is an ex-gay ministry.

== Name ==
Verse 2:25 from the Biblical Book of Joel states: "I will restore to you the years that the swarming locust has eaten, the hopper, the destroyer, and the cutter, my great army, which I sent among you." The organization's website states:

In Joel 2:25, "The hopper, the destroyer, the great cutter, and great army" depict successive waves of scourge after scourge... For many of us, the relational wounds and brokenness underlying homosexuality have destroyed multiple years and caused relational wounds that made recovery and healthy affirmation difficult to take-in. God's promise in Joel 2:25 implies a 'recompense.' He can give us fruitful years as a compensation for those in which the locust ate up the fruits of the earth. This means far more than sexual sobriety and abstinence. It is a healing of emotional wounds and relational brokenness; development of true identity as men of God, fulfillment of needs, and multiple fruitful years of mission and purpose that lead to Joy.

== Formation ==
Joel 2:25 was incorporated in the state of Texas on November 26, 2013 as a non-profit organization. It is a tax-exempt public charity.

== Positions ==
Joel 2:25 supports individual freedom of conscience for all, but believes that sexual purity is a life and death matter: "Sexual holiness for Christians matters to such an extent that living an unrepentant sexually immoral life can get even self-professed Christians excluded from the kingdom of God".

== Reception ==
Joel 2:25 received increased media attention and scrutiny when it was revealed that the organization's founder, Jeremy Schwab, had authored the platform amendment for the 2014 Republican Party of Texas platform to protect the right of access to “reparative therapy”.

Schwab issued personal statements in defense of the platform plank on television and in his personal blog.

== See also ==
- Christianity and homosexuality
- Ex-ex-gay
- Homosexuality and Roman Catholicism
- Homophobia
- Ministry to Persons with a Homosexual Inclination
- Sexual orientation change efforts
