= Truth Wins Out =

American advocacy organization

- Founded: June 2006; 20 years ago
- Founder: Wayne Besen
- Purpose: Gay rights; Hate groups; Fact checking
- Website: truthwinsout.org

Truth Wins Out (TWO) is an organization formed by Wayne Besen to fight what he considers "anti-gay religious extremism", especially the ex-gay movement.

== History ==
Besen formed Truth Wins Out on June 7, 2006, as a response to the belief that a person's homosexual orientation can change. In particular, TWO is critical of organizations and religious ministries which treat homosexuality as a diseased behavior pattern which can be "cured". Besen later launched the related RespectMyResearch project to document what he views as distortions of science by the ex-gay movement, especially Focus on the Family.

In 2018, Truth Wins Out started a petition urging Apple to remove an app from the App Store which allegedly portrayed homosexuality as an "addiction" and "sickness". Apple removed the app by Living Hope Ministries in December. Amazon later removed the app from their platform, while Google allowed the app to remain on the Google Play store.

As of 2019, TWO's seat has been relocated in Philadelphia.

TWO conducts interviews with experts regarding the etiology of sexual orientation. Featured guests include J. Michael Bailey, Ray Blanchard, Milton Diamond, Dean Hamer, Lisa M. Diamond, Ken Zucker, Erick Jannsen, Eric Vilain, Simon LeVay, and Marc Breedlove.

== Protests ==
Truth Wins Out conjugates information with advocacy to defend the LGBT community "against the propaganda campaigns of the religious right".

TWO organizes protests around the country to counter the ex-gay movement. One of TWO's three largest protests occurred on November 4, 2008, at the National Radio Hall of Fame in Chicago. The "Dobson" campaign was being held to protest the induction of James Dobson, the founder of Focus on the Family, into the Radio Hall of Fame. On his websites, Besen posts videos of former ex-gays describing their experience with the ex-gay movement.

== See also ==
- Love Won Out
- Christianity and homosexuality
- LGBT-welcoming church programs
- List of LGBT-related organizations
