= Wayne Besen =

American LGBT rights advocate (born 1970)

- Born: 1970 (age 55–56); United States
- Education: University of Florida
- Known for: Former spokesman for the Human Rights Campaign; Founder of Truth Wins Out
- Awards: Nominated for two Lambda Literary Awards
- Scientific career
- Workplaces: Human Rights Campaign

Wayne Besen (born 1970) is an American journalist and LGBTQ rights advocate. He is a former investigative journalist for WABI-TV, a former spokesman for the Human Rights Campaign, and the founder of Truth Wins Out. Besen came out to his parents before starting his Truth Wins Out Organization. He hosted a radio talk show and is a former columnist.

After coming out to his parents, they bought him an ex-gay DVD that could supposedly hypnotize people and turn them straight. It was that and the invitation by President George W. Bush of ex-gay leader Alan Chambers to the White House that led him to start the Truth Wins Out organization. He wrote the books Lies with a Straight Face: Exposing the Cranks and Cons Inside the Ex-Gay industry and 'Anything but Straight: Unmasking the Scandals and Lies Behind the Ex-Gay Myth' and a collection of his columns has been published titled Bashing Back: Wayne Besen on GLBT People.

Besen has interviewed hundreds of former and current "ex-gays", and is an outspoken critic of conversion therapy organizations such as Homosexuals Anonymous.

== Early life and education ==
Born into a non-religious, liberal Jewish family, Besen attended Kaiser High School in Honolulu, Hawaii. After high school, Besen studied at the University of Florida, where he graduated with a Bachelor of Science degree in broadcast journalism in 1993. While in Florida, Besen helped co-found his first non-profit organization in 1992. Named the Sons & Daughters of America (SDA), the group headed a public awareness campaign focused around gay and lesbian injustices.

== Photos of John Paulk ==
In September 2000, Besen photographed ex-gay activist John Paulk, then Chairman of Exodus International, in a Washington D.C. gay bar called Mr. P's. Paulk said he was simply there to use the washroom, but Besen and other witnesses allege he was drinking and flirting for over 20 minutes. Besen went public with the story, and wrote about it in his book Anything But Straight: Unmasking the Scandals and Lies Behind the Ex-Gay Myth. The book was nominated for two Lambda Literary Awards in 2003.

Besen's photograph of Paulk in September 2000 (and the subsequent release of the story) was instrumental in the ultimate removal of Paulk as Chairman of Exodus International. Exodus International was a major organization in the "Ex-gay movement" until it was disbanded in June 2013. As noted by The Washington Post in October 2002, "John Paulk had been the most famous success story of the Christian ex-gay movement, which seeks to persuade gay men and lesbians to accept Jesus and renounce homosexuality. He had appeared on 60 Minutes, Oprah and the cover of Newsweek."

== Opposition to Catholic activism ==
In November 2009, Besen wrote an opinion piece in the San Francisco Bay Times arguing that the gay community has a "gigantic Pope problem", and that under the leadership of Benedict XVI, the Vatican had become an enemy of liberalism, modernity, and LGBT rights. He was responding to the ecumenical manifesto Manhattan Declaration: A Call of Christian Conscience, which calls upon Christians to oppose laws and policies that attempt to undermine their private religious consciences.

== Criticism of Sam Brinton ==
Besen has expressed skepticism about anti-conversion activist Sam Brinton's description of their childhood conversion therapy experience. Besen noted inconsistencies in Brinton's retelling of events, as well as Brinton's being unable to remember the therapist's name despite having had two years of sessions with him. In the aftermath of 2022 allegations of luggage theft against Brinton, Besen reiterated his concerns and accused various people and groups of failing to heed "clear warning signs" and of making decisions to accept Brinton's recounting of their experience without confirming its veracity as "sloppy, ethically negligent, and shockingly unprofessional" behavior that had given conservative groups and media a talking point to help them denigrate the LGBTQ+ community.
