= Love Won Out =

Former American ex-gay ministry

- Formation: 2009
- Dissolved: 2013
- Parent organization: Focus on the Family; Exodus International

Love Won Out was an ex-gay ministry launched in 1998 by Focus on the Family. It was taken over by Exodus International in 2009 and then became defunct when Exodus International was disbanded in 2013.

== History ==
Love Won Out was launched by Focus on the Family in 1998. It was founded by John Paulk. Its website's stated purpose was "to exhort and equip Christian churches to respond in a Christ-like way to the issue of homosexuality." The mission statement read, "To provide a Christ-centered, comprehensive conference which will enlighten, empower and equip families, church and youth leaders, educators, counselors, policy-makers, and the gay community on the truth about homosexuality and its impact on culture, family, and youth." Love Won Out was sold to a former affiliate Exodus International as a downsizing measure of Focus on the Family. In 2012, Exodus International also presented the conferences under the name True Story. On June 19, 2013, Exodus International President Alan Chambers announced the board of directors had voted unanimously to disband and close. Alan Chambers offered an apology to the gay community and reversed his stance on the past teachings of Exodus International's ministry.

== Views ==
Love Won Out's stated objective was to help men and women "who struggle with unwanted same-sex attractions", believing that "same-sex attractions can be overcome", and asserting that "there are no conclusive studies supporting any specific biological or genetic cause for homosexuality". It was the opinion of Love Won Out that "the foundation of society for the family is marriage of a man and a woman for life ... Scripture is very clear in its condemnation of homosexual conduct, for such sin is a deviation from God's creation and design." The psychologist James Dobson adds that God loves the homosexual as much as any other person.

Love Won Out believed that the Bible regards homosexual conduct as sin. James Dobson stated "The sin of homosexual behavior, like all sins, can be forgiven and healed by the grace revealed in the life and death of Christ. All sexual sin affects the human personality like no other sin, for sexual issues run deep in our character, and change is slow and uphill - but is possible nonetheless."

Love Won Out said that "The media and others have misrepresented male homosexuality as a pre-determined, biological condition", and that "Contrary to the popular myth that homosexuality is genetic, same-sex attraction is a preventable and treatable condition". The conferences focus on what it terms "the family dynamics that can lead to the development of same-sex desires", stressing that homosexuality is abnormal, claiming, "The goal of gay activists is to 'overhaul' America with the message that homosexuality is normal and healthy."

The conference addressed "the Pro-Gay Agenda in Your School", offering reference material and sample letters to educators and parents to have parental notification prior to class discussion of any issues surrounding sexuality. Homosexuality being mentioned in schools non discrimination policy's, homosexual student clubs, programs to stop homophobia hate or bias, Pro-homosexual literature in school libraries, openly gay teachers, AIDS sex ed programs, outside gay friendly groups, recognition of gay pride month, exhibits or films on families headed by homosexuals, silencing students and parents who voiced concerns, and diversity workshops were discussed as determining the level of "Homosexual Promotion" in your school.

Love Won Out wanted to help people who want to understand factors that lead to homosexuality and assist those who struggle with unwanted same-sex attractions. They taught that the root cause of homosexuality is a gender-identity problem. According to their belief, homosexuality in males is caused by a "dominant mother with a quiet, withdrawn, non expressive and/or hostile father, and an introverted, artistic, imaginative son." They also believe that this is accompanied by poor communication between the mother and the father, and the son having a closer relationship with the mother and an antagonistic relationship with the father.

Love Won Out concurred with one position of the American Psychiatric Association when it states "some people believe that sexual orientation is innate and fixed; however, sexual orientation develops across a person's lifetime," though the APA also states, "All major professional mental health organizations have gone on record to affirm that homosexuality is not a mental disorder."

=== Homosexuality and politics ===
Love Won Out claimed that the goal of the "gay agenda" is "Normalization through desensitization, Undermining parental moral authority, and equating homosexuality to heterosexuality."

James Dobson states in the forward of the conference guide:

There is no evidence that homosexuals as a class are discriminated against in the present society. They are not like African-Americans, Hispanics, or other historically disadvantaged groups, for their identity is based on changeable behavior ...

Love Won Out stated that "marriage will continue to be 'redefined'" and that Same-Sex Marriage may mean for our society: "possible threats to freedom of speech and religious liberty." The conference made a point to "effectively argue for the benefits of traditional marriage to their friends, co-workers and legislators," and says that gay marriage is not in the best interest of families and children. The organization stated that same-sex marriage places adult desires above the best interest of our children, "same-sex marriage intentionally creates motherless or fatherless families."

== Conferences ==
Love Won Out held conferences multiple times a year throughout the United States; as of October 2008, 52 conferences had been held. The conferences said they "exist to help men and women dissatisfied with living homosexually understand that same-sex attractions can be overcome." Conferences have counseling sessions, seminars on homosexuality and advice for families with gay or lesbian relatives. There were also group lectures, where participants hear "powerful stories of ex-gay men and women." In addition, conferences challenged Christian churches to reach out to the gay community.

== Affiliation with NARTH ==
Love Won Out collaborated with NARTH. On November 4, 2006, Joseph Nicolosi represented NARTH at the Love Won Out Conference speaking on "Prevention of Male Homosexuality" and on "The Condition of Male Homosexuality". Nicolosi, who died in 2017, was the president and principal research investigator for NARTH, and clinical director of the Thomas Aquinas Psychological Clinic in Encino, Calif., where he worked with persons suffering undesired same-sex attraction.

== Sale to Exodus International ==
Exodus International bought the Love Won Out conference in 2009. Gary Schneeberger, Focus on the Family's vice president of media and public relations issued a statement stating "... the conferences rarely have recouped the financial investment made in them ... Our financial challenges (at Focus on the Family) have led us to recognize a strategic opportunity that makes sense ..."

Exodus-affiliated groups had worked with homosexual persons, seeking to achieve "freedom from homosexuality" which Exodus believed included abstinence, lessening of same-sex attraction, and change of inappropriate gender roles. In June 2013, CEO Alan Chambers announced that the board of Exodus International voted unanimously to disband and close. "The Board of Directors reached a decision after a year of dialogue and prayer about the organization's place in a changing culture."

== Renunciation by founder ==
John Paulk, the founder of LWO, formally renounced the organization in April 2013, saying (in part):

Today, I do not consider myself "ex-gay" and I no longer support or promote the movement. Please allow me to be clear: I do not believe that reparative therapy changes sexual orientation; in fact, it does great harm to many people.

I know that countless people were harmed by things I said and did in the past, Parents, families, and their loved ones were negatively impacted by the notion of reparative therapy and the message of change. I am truly, truly sorry for the pain I have caused.

From the bottom of my heart I wish I could take back my words and actions that caused anger, depression, guilt and hopelessness. In their place I want to extend love, hope, tenderness, joy and the truth that gay people are loved by God.

Today, I see LGBT people for who they are — beloved, cherished children of God. I offer my most sincere and heartfelt apology to men, women, and especially children and teens who felt unlovable, unworthy, shamed or thrown away by God or the church.

== See also ==
- Conversion therapy
- Homosexuality and Christianity
- Watchmen on the Walls
