= Anthony Venn-Brown =

Australian writer

Anthony Venn-Brown OAM
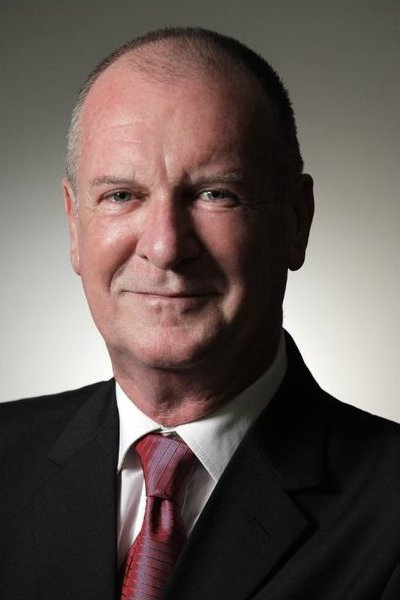

Personal life
- Born: 13 March 1951 (age 75)
- Notable work: A Life of Unlearning (2004, revised 2007)
- Known for: advocacy for GLBTIQ people from Evangelical backgrounds, co-founding Freedom 2b, founding ABBI.

Religious life
- Religion: Christianity (formerly Assemblies of God; Baptist; Pentecostal)
- Profession: Former Evangelist, Author, Co-founder and Convenor of Freedom 2b, Founder and CEO of Ambassadors and Bridge Builders International (ABBI)

Anthony Venn-Brown OAM (born 13 March 1951) is an Australian former evangelist in the Assemblies of God now (Australian Christian Churches) and an author whose book, A Life of Unlearning, describes his experience in Australia's first ex-gay program. He is also the co-founder and previous Convenor of Freedom 2b which is a network for GLBTIQ (Gay, Lesbian, Bisexual, Transgender, Intersex and Queer) people from Evangelical backgrounds. He is also the founder and CEO of Ambassadors & Bridge Builders International (ABBI).

== Early life ==
Anthony Venn-Brown was born in 1951 and raised in a family with a strong Anglican Church background (Anglo-Catholic). His family were committed to church life during his early years but as a teenager Anthony felt that the rituals, language and beliefs were irrelevant not only to him but also the generation of the 60's and he ceased all involvement in the church. It was also at this time the awareness of his homosexuality increased. Australian society in the 60's viewed homosexuality as a mental illness/perversion and it was a criminal offence. This led to deep depression and a suicide attempt. Anthony Venn-Brown eventually made contact with evangelical Anglicans in the Sydney Diocese in his quest to be "normal" and acceptable to his family and friends and was converted in 1969. After his conversion in 1969, Anthony continued to be involved in evangelism and was baptised in a Baptist church. Many times he felt that God had answered his prayer and that he had been set free of his attraction to the same sex. However, although these moments were spiritually exhilarating they did not have a lasting impact on his life. Believing that 'more faith and more power' was needed to overcome his 'problem', Anthony began to explore his Christianity in the Charismatic renewal, which had just commenced in Sydney, and also traditional Pentecostal contexts. In 1971, after feeling a strong call to ministry, Anthony attended Faith Bible College, a pastoral and missionary training centre in New Zealand. After confessing to the leadership of the college that he still struggled with homosexuality, he underwent several weeks of exorcisms through the ministry of Pastor Neville Johnson at Queen Street Assemblies of God in Auckland. However, on returning to Australia, Anthony was still troubled by his sexuality, and believing that he could never serve God until this part of his life was overcome, he signed himself into a 'live-in' ex-gay program for six months at Moombara and Bundeena Christian Fellowship (a rehabilitation centre that claimed success for drug addicts, prostitutes and homosexuals). Anthony then moved to Orange, New South Wales in 1972 and began youth work for the local Assemblies of God Church and was married in 1974.

== Early ministry ==
Venn-Brown pioneered several Assemblies of God churches in regional NSW including Port Macquarie, Gunnedah, Wauchope and Laurieton before moving to Sydney with his family in the early 1980s and founding "Every Believer Evangelism." Venn-Brown became a popular preacher at all the major churches of the Assemblies of God in Australia, including Hillsong Church's predecessor Christian Life Centre, and also preached overseas. In 1990 he became the first Pentecostal to be appointed to the Lausanne Committee for World Evangelism in Australia.

== Youth Alive ==
The Assemblies of God asked Venn-Brown to start a new youth work to replace the NSW Assemblies of God current youth organisation which was called Christ's ambassadors and start some large scale youth events. The first Youth Alive event was a concert held in the beachside suburb of Manly, New South Wales on 23 February 1985. Some more conservative members of the Assemblies of God opposed the event because of the use of Christian rock music and walked out. However, Youth Alive became a very successful youth organisation and eventually grew to events of over 20 000 people. Venn-Brown eventually handed over the ministry to his assistant Pat Mesiti as he wanted to concentrate on developing "Every Believer Evangelism".Venn-Brown, A. (2007) A Life of unlearning: a journey to find the truth.

== Coming out ==
Venn-Brown resigned as a minister in 1991 after coming out as a gay man, this was after being caught having an affair with a man. In 2004, he published his autobiography, A Life of Unlearning - Coming out of the church, One Man's Struggle. The book detailed his struggle to reconcile his homosexuality with his Christian beliefs. It won the Sydney Gay and Lesbian Business Association Literary award in 2004. The revised edition, A Life of Unlearning - a Journey to Find the Truth was published in 2007. Anthony doesn't feel he will return to preaching, saying "30 years down the track someone who is gay or lesbian will be allowed to minister. I hope I'm there to see it, but I feel I've had my ministry. When I came back to God I felt like I had the essence of what it was all about. What I have now is real. I have learned to live non-judgementally, to live with integrity and I didn't have that as a preacher." Anthony Venn-Brown was one of the keynote speakers at the 2008 "Evangelical Network Conference" in Arizona.

== Dialogue between the church and the LGBT community ==
Preferring to be known as a gay ambassador instead of gay activist, Venn-Brown is now a representative and advocate of gay and lesbian people. He seeks to create an informed, intelligent yet respectful dialogue about the issues of same sex orientation within the Christian and particularly Pentecostal community. One of the models that he has developed is "Creating a Space for Change". This is a non-confrontational way of changing stereotypes and preconceived ideas. One of the first people to be involved in this dialogue was Pastor Mike Hercock, a Baptist minister who was leading a church in Darlinghurst, Sydney. A friendship developed and Anthony relayed the many stories of tragedy and loss experienced by gay and lesbian people who had been rejected by the church. Anthony introduced Mike to the work of Freedom 2b. He was deeply touched by the stories of those he met. In 2007, Freedom 2b marched for the first time in the Sydney Gay and Lesbian Mardi Gras parade. Seeing the profound impact this had on those who had lived for so many years in shame, guilt and fear, Pastor Hercock stated that the following year he would encourage 100 Evangelical ministers to sign an apology to the LGBT community for the way the church had mistreated them and march in the 2008 Sydney Gay and Lesbian Mardi Gras. This movement became known as the 100 Revs and led to the following statement.

"As ministers of various churches and denominations we recognise that the churches we belong to, and the church in general, have not been places of welcome for gay, lesbian, bisexual and transgender (GLBT) people. Indeed the church has often been profoundly unloving toward the GLBT community. For these things we apologise, whatever the distinctive of our Christian position on human sexuality – to which we remain committed. We are deeply sorry and ask for the forgiveness of the GLBT community. We long that the church would be a place of welcome for all people and commit ourselves to pursuing this goal."

In 2007, Anthony co-ordinated the release of a statement from five Australian ex-gay leaders who publicly apologized for their past actions.

In 2010, Anthony was invited to lecture on "An Alternative Approach to Sexual Orientation, Gender Diversity and the Christian Faith" at Tabor College in Melbourne (one of Australia's leading bible colleges). This was the first time an openly gay man was invited to speak at an Evangelical bible college in Australia. Anthony was also featured on the ABC series, Hungry Beast in 2010.

In 2011, Anthony resigned as the leader of Freedom 2b to concentrate further on his bridge-building, ambassadorial and educational activities. He has recently founded Ambassadors and Bridge Builders International, his focus continues to be the deconstruction of the 'ex-gay' myth, educating in the areas of faith sexuality conflict, working with gay and lesbian people in heterosexual marriages and creating respectful, informed dialogues between the LGBT community and the Church. Anthony was twice voted one of Australia's 25 Most Influential Gay & Lesbian Australians (2007 & 2009). Anthony was nominated for an ACON Honour Award in September 2011 in the category of Community Hero. These awards recognise outstanding LGBT community achievements and/or contributions.

In March 2012, Anthony Venn -Brown was featured along with other Freedom2b members in an Australian documentary "The Cure" which examined ex-gay programs in Australia. The film is currently (2012) being shown around Australia and has led to a number of newspaper articles on the role of the Australian church in the promotion of current ex-gay programs in Australia. Anthony Venn-Brown and psychologist Paul Martin were quoted as stating that ex-gay programs caused "deep psychological damage" and had even led to suicides.

In 2012, Anthony was awarded a lifetime membership of the Sydney Gay and Lesbian Business Association (SGLBA) for his work with the LGBT community including the creation of the Ambassadors and Bridge Builders International organisation (ABBI) and the founding of Freedom2b.

=== Honours ===
- 8 June 2020 Order of Australia (OAM), For service to the LGBTIQ community.
