= Focus on the Family =

American evangelical Protestant organization

- Founded: 1977; 49 years ago California, United States
- Founder: James Dobson
- Tax ID no.: 95-3188150 (EIN)
- Location(s): 8605 Explorer Dr; Colorado Springs, Colorado 80920, United States
- Region served: 98 countries
- Key people: Jim Daly; (president and CEO); John Fuller; (VP audio division); Paul Batura; (VP communications); Tim Goeglein; (VP external and governmental relations); Robyn Chambers; (VP advocacy for children)
- Revenue: $141,927,265 (2025 FY)
- Employees: 880 (as of 2023)
- Volunteers: 112
- Website: www.focusonthefamily.com

Focus on the Family (FOTF or FotF) is an American evangelical Protestant organization founded in 1977 in Southern California by James Dobson, based in Colorado Springs, Colorado. The group is one of a number of evangelical parachurch organizations that rose to prominence in the 1980s. As of the 2017 tax filing year, Focus on the Family declared itself to be a church, "primarily to protect the confidentiality of our donors". Traditionally, churches are entities that have regular worship services and congregants.

It prominently lobbies against LGBT rights—including those related to marriage, adoption, and parenting—labeling it a "particularly evil lie of Satan". The organization also seeks to change public policy in the areas of sex education, creationism, abortion, state-sponsored school prayer, gambling, drugs, and enforcement of their interpretation of proper gender roles.

The core promotional activities of the organization include the flagship daily radio broadcast hosted by its president Jim Daly together with co-host John Fuller. Focus also provides free resources in line with the group's views, and publishes books, magazines, videos, and audio recordings.

The organization produces programs for targeted audiences, such as Adventures in Odyssey, McGee and Me!, The Last Chance Detectives, and Ribbits! for children, and dramas for other audiences. The Southern Poverty Law Center has classified Focus on the Family as an anti-LGBTQ hate group.

== History ==
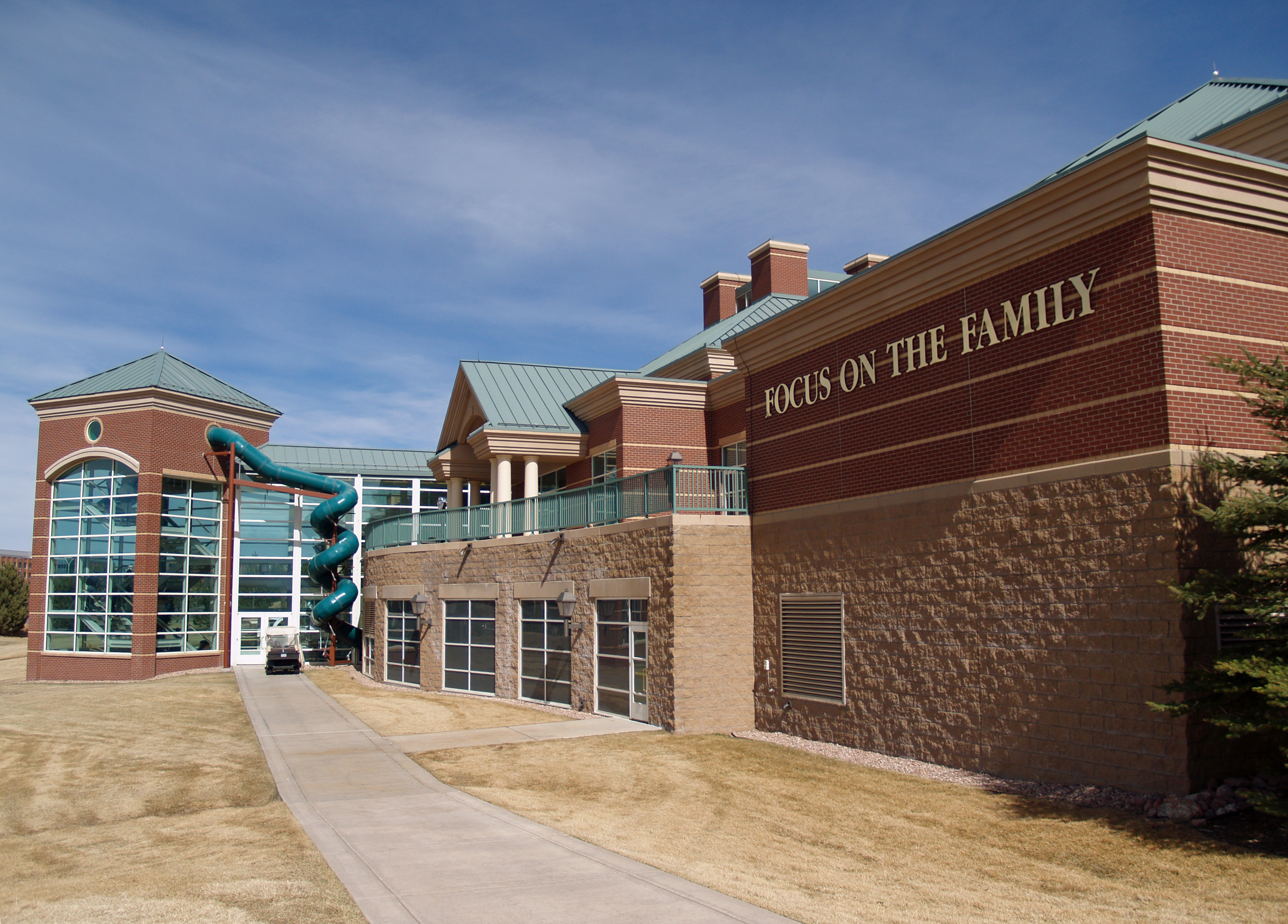
Focus on the Family's Visitor's Welcome Center in Colorado Springs, Colorado

=== Origins and Dobson era ===
From 1977 to 2003, James Dobson served as the sole leader of the organization, which was originally based in Arcadia, California. Dobson and his organization generated significant controversy by taking a different approach to ministry than many other evangelical parachurch organizations, opting to combine its parenting programs with conservative political activism. By 1993, Focus on the Family was receiving approximately 10,000 personal letters and 3,000 phone calls per day by individuals seeking personal assistance from the organization.

The organization, and especially James Dobson, wielded significant national influence within the U.S., and particularly among politically conservative Christians and women working within the home. During the 1990s, Dobson and Focus on the Family were accused by an early member of the organization of moving away from their original mission of helping families and instead becoming "too political". The organization's cornerstone items included their radio broadcasts, as well as other ventures such as their film publishing arm Focus on the Family Films.

In 2003, Donald P. Hodel became president and chief executive officer, tasked with the day-to-day operations. Dobson remained chairman of the board of directors, with chiefly creative and speaking duties. In March 2005, Hodel retired and Jim Daly, formerly the vice president in charge of Focus on the Family's International Division, assumed the role of president and chief executive officer.

By 2007, the executive leadership of the organization reportedly worked to sustain the group's cultural influence by investing more heavily into family programs targeted at younger generations as opposed to only bolstering its political programs favored by James Dobson. As a result of targeting a younger demographic more frequently in digital spaces, the organization reported a decrease in donations, dropping from 755,000 donors in 2004 to 564,000 donors by September 2007.

In the first decade the 2000s, Focus lead abstinence programs both domestically in the U.S. and worldwide. The program, often titled No Apologies, had some success in Muslim-majority countries such as Egypt and Malaysia where the teachings of abstinence aligned with messages of Islam. The program was brought to China with the permission of the Chinese Communist Party, who desired to bring down birth rates at the time.

In November 2008, the organization eliminated 202 jobs, representing 18 percent of its workforce. The organization also cut its budget from $160 million in fiscal 2008 to $138 million for fiscal 2009.

In February 2009, Dobson resigned his chairmanship. He left Focus on the Family in early 2010, and subsequently founded Family Talk as a non-profit organization and launched a new broadcast that began airing nationally on May 3, 2010. He died in August 2025.

=== Post-Dobson ===
In a break from the previous status quo, president Jim Daly purportedly tried to steer the organization away from the same level of political activism that the organization was known for in its initial decades of existence. Daly made connections with figures and organizations that founder Dobson disdained and cut off, such as Democratic United States President Barack Obama, liberal activist Ted Trimpa, and the newspaper The Independent.

On June 23, 2017, Vice President Mike Pence attended the organization's 40th anniversary celebration; at the event, he praised founder James Dobson, stated that then-President Donald Trump was an ally of the organization, and added that the Trump administration supported Focus on the Family's goals (including the abolition of Planned Parenthood). Pence's attendance at the event, along with Focus on the Family's stances on LGBT rights, was criticized by the Human Rights Campaign.

In its IRS Form 990 for Tax Year 2015, dated October 26, 2017, Focus on the Family for the first time declared itself a "church, convention of churches or association of churches", claiming that it was no longer required to file the IRS disclosure form and that the sources and disposition of its $89 million budget were "Not for public inspection". Tax attorney Gail Harmon, who advises nonprofit organizations on tax law, said she found the declaration "shocking", noting that "There's nothing about them that meets the traditional definition of what a church is. They don't have a congregation, they don't have the rites of various parts of a person's life." A spokesperson for the organization stated that it changed its status "primarily to protect the confidentiality of our donors". By 2023, the organization had offices in 14 countries and partnerships in 60 countries, for an international presence in 98 countries.

== Programs ==
=== Wait No More ===
Focus on the Family's Wait No More ministry works with adoption agencies, church leaders and ministry partners to recruit families to adopt children from foster care. In Colorado, the number of children waiting for adoption dropped from approximately 800 to 350 people, due in part to the efforts of Wait No More. Focus on the Family's efforts to encourage adoption among Christian families is part of a larger effort by Evangelicals to, in their perception, live out what they see as the "biblical mandate" to help children.

=== Option Ultrasound Program ===
Focus on the Family's Option Ultrasound Program (OUP) provides grants to crisis pregnancy centers to pay the cost of ultrasound machines or sonography training. Focus on the Family began OUP in 2004 with the goal of convincing women not to have abortions. FOTF officials said that ultrasound services help a woman better understand her pregnancy and baby's development, creating an important "bonding opportunity" between "mother and unborn child".

In 2011, FOTF announced that they would like to talk with pro-choice groups like Planned Parenthood to work towards the shared goal of making abortion less common. Rep. Michele Bachmann (R-Minn.) introduced a sonogram bill in 2011 and, citing Focus on the Family, told Congress that "78 percent of women who see and hear the fetal heartbeat choose life." She was later corrected by Focus on the Family, which released a statement saying they did not release such data. A study released in February 2012 showed that ultrasounds do not have a direct impact on an abortion decision.

=== Boundless.org ===
Boundless.org is Focus on the Family's website for young adults ages 18–34 featuring articles, a blog, a podcast, and a conference. The site has been classified as a webzine, and originally included a moderated forum for young adults to exchange thoughts and ideas about topics relevant to them without being dictated what they should believe by an "authoritarian tone". The website covers topics such as singleness, dating, relationships, popular culture, career, and sex.

=== Plugged In ===
Plugged In is a Focus on the Family publication and associated website created for families that reviews magazines, newspaper comics, films, books, music, and TV and radio shows. As of 2007 it was one of their most popular products, and reviews were offered to members through both their website and through text messages.

=== Day of Dialogue ===
The Day of Dialogue was a student event which took place April 16. Since 2018, the event is no longer marked on a single date, or organized nationally. Founders described the goal of the event, created in opposition to the anti-bullying and anti-homophobic Day of Silence, as "encouraging honest and respectful conversation among students about God's design for sexuality". It was previously known as the Day of Truth and was founded by the Alliance Defense Fund in 2005. In 2007, Exodus International began supporting the Day of Truth, an event created by Alliance Defending Freedom (ADF) in 2005 that opposes homosexuality.

In 2009, the ADF announced they had passed on their leadership role for the event to Exodus. In October 2010, Exodus announced they would no longer support the event. President Alan Chambers stated they realized they needed to "equip kids to live out biblical tolerance and grace while treating their neighbors as they'd like to be treated, whether they agree with them or not", adding that the Day of Truth was becoming too divisive. Chambers said that Exodus had not changed its position on homosexuality, rather they were reevaluating how to best communicate their message. Focus on the Family subsequently claimed leadership of the event, and renamed it the Day of Dialogue.

=== National Day of Prayer ===
The National Day of Prayer Task Force is an American evangelical conservative Christian non-profit organization which organizes, coordinates, and presides over Evangelical Christian religious observances each year on the National Day of Prayer. The website of the NDP Task Force states that "its business affairs are separate" from those of Focus on the Family, but also that "between 1990 and 1993, Focus on the Family did provide grants in support of the NDP Task Force" and that "Focus on the Family is compensated for services rendered." Shirley Dobson, wife of James Dobson, was chairwoman of the NDP Task Force from 1991 until 2016, when Anne Graham Lotz, daughter of evangelist Billy Graham, assumed the post.

=== Radio Theatre ===
Radio Theatre is a program run by Focus on the Family that makes both original and adapted radio dramas. Much of the staff involved with Adventures in Odyssey is also involved with Radio Theatre such as Paul McCusker. They have adapted novels including Les Miserables and Anne of Green Gables as well as the complete Chronicles of Narnia. Performers on their adaptations have included Andy Serkis.

== Former ministries ==
=== Family Life Seminars ===
One of Focus on the Family's earliest ministries, Family Life Seminars were speaking events hosted by James Dobson in the 1970s. To reduce the time that the events were taking Dobson away from his own family, the seminars were eventually recorded and released as a seven-part film series. The film series then in turn inspired a television program based on the films.

=== Love Won Out ===
Focus on the Family formed Love Won Out, an ex-gay ministry in 1998. In 2009, it was sold to Exodus International.

== Political positions and activities ==
Focus on the Family's 501(c)(3) status prevents them from advocating any individual political candidate, though it has permitted them to spend up to a certain amount on other political activities such as lobbying and voter education. Focus on the Family has an affiliated group, Family Policy Alliance, though the two groups are legally separate. As a 501(c)(4) social welfare group, Family Policy Alliance has fewer political lobbying restrictions. FOTF's revenue in 2012 was US$90.5 million, and that of Family Policy Alliance (formerly CitizenLink) was US$8 million. By 2023, Family Policy Alliance and its network of local state councils were generating over $40 million of revenue.

Focus on the Family maintains a strong stand against abortion, and provides grant funding and medical training to assist crisis pregnancy centers (CPCs; also known as pregnancy resource centers) in obtaining ultrasound machines. According to the organization, this funding, which has allowed CPCs to provide pregnant women with live sonogram images of the developing fetus, has led directly to the birth of over 1500 babies who would have otherwise been aborted. The organization has been staunchly opposed to public funding for elective abortions.

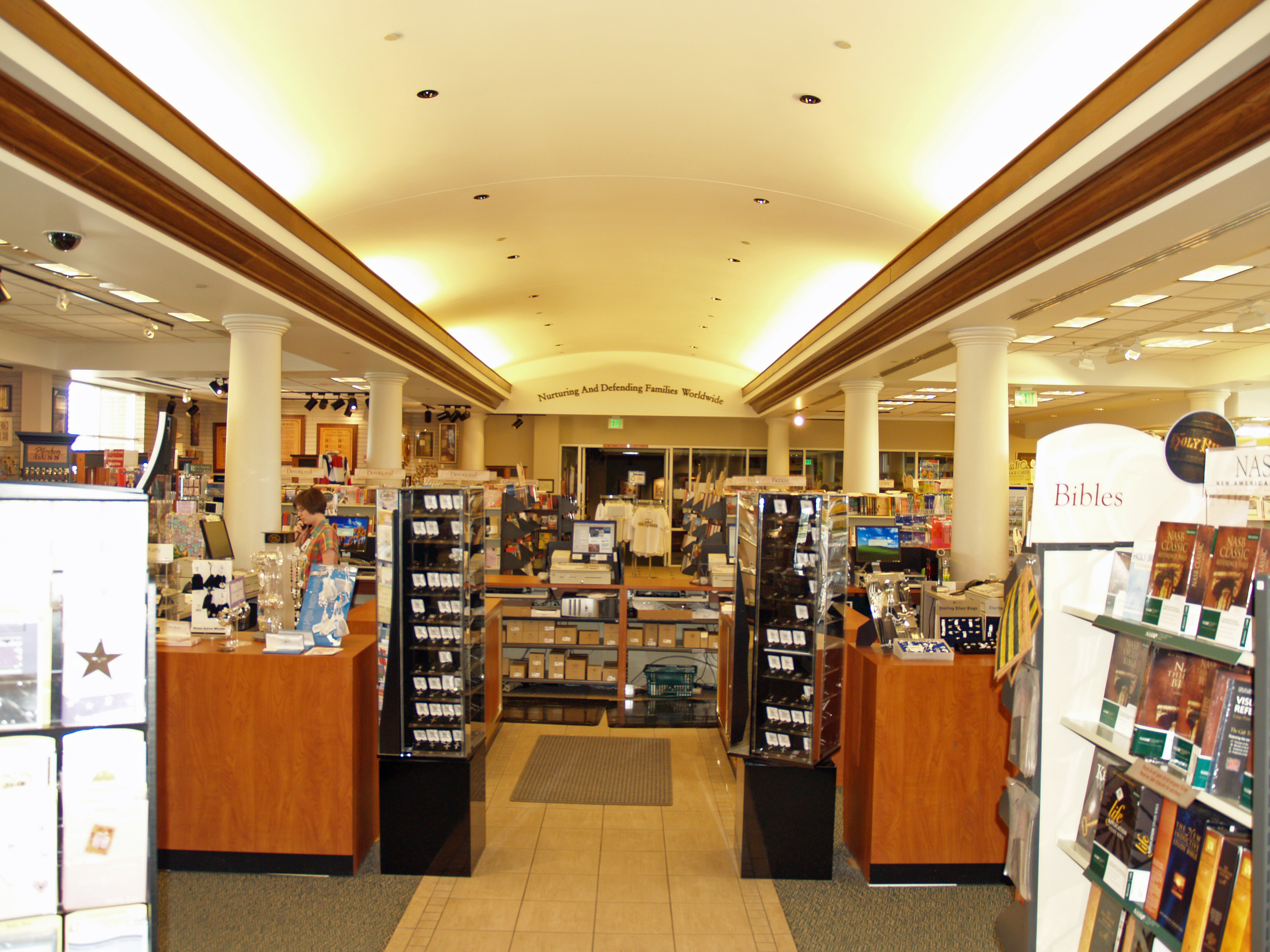
FOTF's bookstore at their headquarters contains a variety of material on Christian living, Bibles, etc.

Focus on the Family has been a prominent supporter of the pseudoscience of intelligent design, publishing pro-intelligent design articles in its Citizen magazine and selling intelligent design videos on its website.

In New Zealand, Focus on the Family supported a Citizens Initiated Referendum on the repeal of section 59 of the Crimes Act 1961, which placed limits on the physical disciplining of children.

Focus on the Family Singapore came under criticism in October 2014 over allegations of sexism and promoting gender stereotypes during their workshops on managing relationships for junior college students. The workshop received a complaint from both a Hwa Chong Junior College student, as well as negative feedback from the college management as being 'ineffective' and stopped before the end of the year.

Following the 2022 U.S. Supreme Court decision to overturn Roe v. Wade, Focus on the Family published an article on its Daily Citizen site urging conservative Christians to engage in a "cultural civil war" against "radical abortion laws" implemented in left-leaning states. This added to speculation that political violence similar to the January 6th attacks could be accepted or encouraged on the grounds of opposing abortion rights.

=== 2008 presidential campaign ===
In the 2008 United States presidential election, Focus on the Family shifted from supporting Mike Huckabee, to not supporting any candidate, to accepting the Republican ticket once Sarah Palin was added. Prior to the election, a television and letter campaign was launched predicting terrorist attacks in four U.S. cities and equating the U.S. with Nazi Germany. This publicity was condemned by the Anti-Defamation League. Within a month before the general election, Focus on the Family began distributing a 16-page letter titled Letter from 2012 in Obama's America, which describes an imagined American future in which "many of our freedoms have been taken away by a liberal Supreme Court of the United States and a majority of Democrats in both the House of Representatives and the Senate". According to USA Today, the letter was "part of an escalation in rhetoric from Christian right activists" trying to paint Democratic Party presidential nominee Senator Barack Obama in a negative light.

Focus on the Family Action supported Senator Saxby Chambliss (R-Ga.) in his successful December 2, 2008, runoff election win. The organization, according to the Colorado Independent, donated $35,310 in radio ads to the Chambliss runoff campaign effort. As the Independent reports, the Focus-sponsored ads were aired in about a dozen Georgia markets. The commercials were produced in the weeks after Focus laid off 202 employees, some 20 percent of its workforce, because of the national economic crisis.

=== Opposition to LGBTQ rights ===
One of Focus on the Family's notable political stances is its strong opposition to same-sex marriage, civil unions, and domestic partnerships. Focus on the Family, through its partnership with Family Policy Alliance, also strongly advocates for legislation against transgender rights, including crafted policies which oppose the consensus of medical experts who work with the transgender community. The organization has referred to the LGBT rights movement as a "particularly evil lie of Satan".

Focus on the Family founder James Dobson drew criticism for using the group to oppose homosexual members in the United States Military. Similarly, Dobson and the organization supported a 1992 amendment to the Colorado constitution which stopped laws that allowed for protections from LGBTQ discrimination.

Dobson spoke at the 2004 rally against gay marriage called Mayday for Marriage. The event marked the first time that Dobson publicly endorsed a presidential candidate, George W. Bush. During the event he denounced the Supreme Court rulings in favor of gay rights, and he urged rally participants to vote so that the battle against gay rights could be won in the Senate.

In an interview with Christianity Today, Dobson also explained that he was not in favor of civil unions. He stated that generally agreed civil unions were merely same-sex marriage under a different name. He claimed his main priority in opposing the same-sex marriage movement was first and foremost to define marriage on the federal level as being exclusive between a man and a woman, and that afterward he wished to combat the passage of civil unions on a state-by-state basis.

Civil rights advocacy groups identify Focus on the Family as a major opponent of LGBT rights. The Southern Poverty Law Center, a civil rights and hate group monitoring organization, described Focus on the Family as one of a "dozen major groups [which] help drive the religious right's anti-gay crusade". While the Southern Poverty Law Center previously did not classify Focus on the Family as a hate group, for it opposed homosexuality "on strictly Biblical grounds", the organization officially classified Focus on the Family as one in May 2025.

Focus on the Family was a member of ProtectMarriage.com, a coalition formed to sponsor California Proposition 8, a ballot initiative to restrict marriage to opposite-sex couples, which passed in 2008, but was subsequently struck down as being unconstitutional by a federal court in Perry v. Schwarzenegger.

=== Misrepresentation of research ===
Social scientists have criticized Focus on the Family for misrepresenting their research in order to bolster its own perspective. Researcher Judith Stacey, whose work was used by Focus on the Family to claim that gays and lesbians do not make good parents, said that the claim was "a direct misrepresentation of the research". She elaborated, "Whenever you hear Focus on the Family, legislators or lawyers say, 'Studies prove that children do better in families with a mother and a father,' they are referring to studies which compare two-parent heterosexual households to single-parent households. The studies they are talking about do not cite research on families headed by gay and lesbian couples." FOTF claimed that Stacey's allegation was without merit and that their position is that the best interests of children are served when there is a father and a mother. "We haven't said anything about sexual orientation", said Glenn Stanton.

James Dobson cited the research of Kyle Pruett and Carol Gilligan in a Time magazine guest article in the service of a claim that two women cannot raise a child; upon finding out that her work had been used in this way, Gilligan wrote a letter to Dobson asking him to apologize and to cease and desist from citing her work, describing herself as "mortified to learn that you had distorted my work ... Not only did you take my research out of context, you did so without my knowledge to support discriminatory goals that I do not agree with ... there is nothing in my research that would lead you to draw the stated conclusions you did in the Time article." Pruett wrote a similar letter, in which he said that Dobson "cherry-picked a phrase to shore up highly (in my view) discriminatory purposes. This practice is condemned in real science, common though it may be in pseudo-science circles. There is nothing in my longitudinal research or any of my writings to support such conclusions", and asked that FOTF not cite him again without permission.

After Elizabeth Saewyc's research on teen suicide was used by Focus on the Family to promote conversion therapy she said that "the research has been hijacked for somebody's political purposes or ideological purposes and that's worrisome", and that research in fact linked the suicide rate among LGBT teens to harassment, discrimination, and closeting. Other scientists who have criticized Focus on the Family for misrepresenting their findings include Robert Spitzer, Gary Remafedi, and Angela Phillips.

=== Football advertisements ===
In 2010, Focus on the Family bought ad time during Super Bowl XLIV to air a commercial featuring Heisman Trophy winning Florida Gators quarterback Tim Tebow and his mother, Pam. In the ad, Pam described Tim as a "miracle baby" who "almost didn't make it into this world", and further elaborated that "with all our family's been through, we have to be tough" (after which Pam was promptly tackled by Tim). The ad directed viewers to the organization's website.

Women's rights groups asked CBS not to air the then-unseen ad, arguing that it was divisive. Planned Parenthood released a video response of its own featuring fellow NFL player Sean James. The claim that Tebow's family chose not to perform an abortion was also widely criticized; critics felt that the claim was implausible because it would be unlikely for doctors to recommend the procedure because abortion is illegal in the Philippines, where Tebow was born. CBS's decision to run the ad was also criticized for deviating from its past policy to reject advocacy-type ads during the Super Bowl, including ads by left-leaning groups such as PETA, MoveOn.org and the United Church of Christ (which wanted to run an ad that was pro-same-sex marriage). However, CBS stated that "we have for some time moderated our approach to advocacy submissions after it became apparent that our stance did not reflect public sentiment or industry norms on the issue."

Focus on the Family produced another commercial which ran during the second quarter of the January 14, 2012 Denver Broncos-New England Patriots AFC Divisional Playoff broadcast on CBS, featuring children reciting the Bible verse John 3:16. The ad did not generate nearly the amount of controversy that surrounded the Super Bowl commercial. It did gain some national media attention, and president Jim Daly stated in a press release that its purpose was to "help everyone understand some numbers are more important than the ones on the scoreboard."

== Recognition and awards ==
In 2008, Dobson's Focus on the Family program was nominated for induction into the National Radio Hall of Fame. Nominations were made by the 157 members of the Hall of Fame and voting on inductees was handed over to the public using online voting. The nomination drew the ire of gay rights activists, who launched efforts to have the program removed from the nominee list and to vote for other nominees to prevent Focus from winning. However, on July 18, 2008, it was announced that the program had won and would be inducted into the Radio Hall of Fame in a ceremony on November 8, 2008. Truth Wins Out, a gay rights group, protested against the ceremony with over 300 protesters.

== Headquarters and size ==
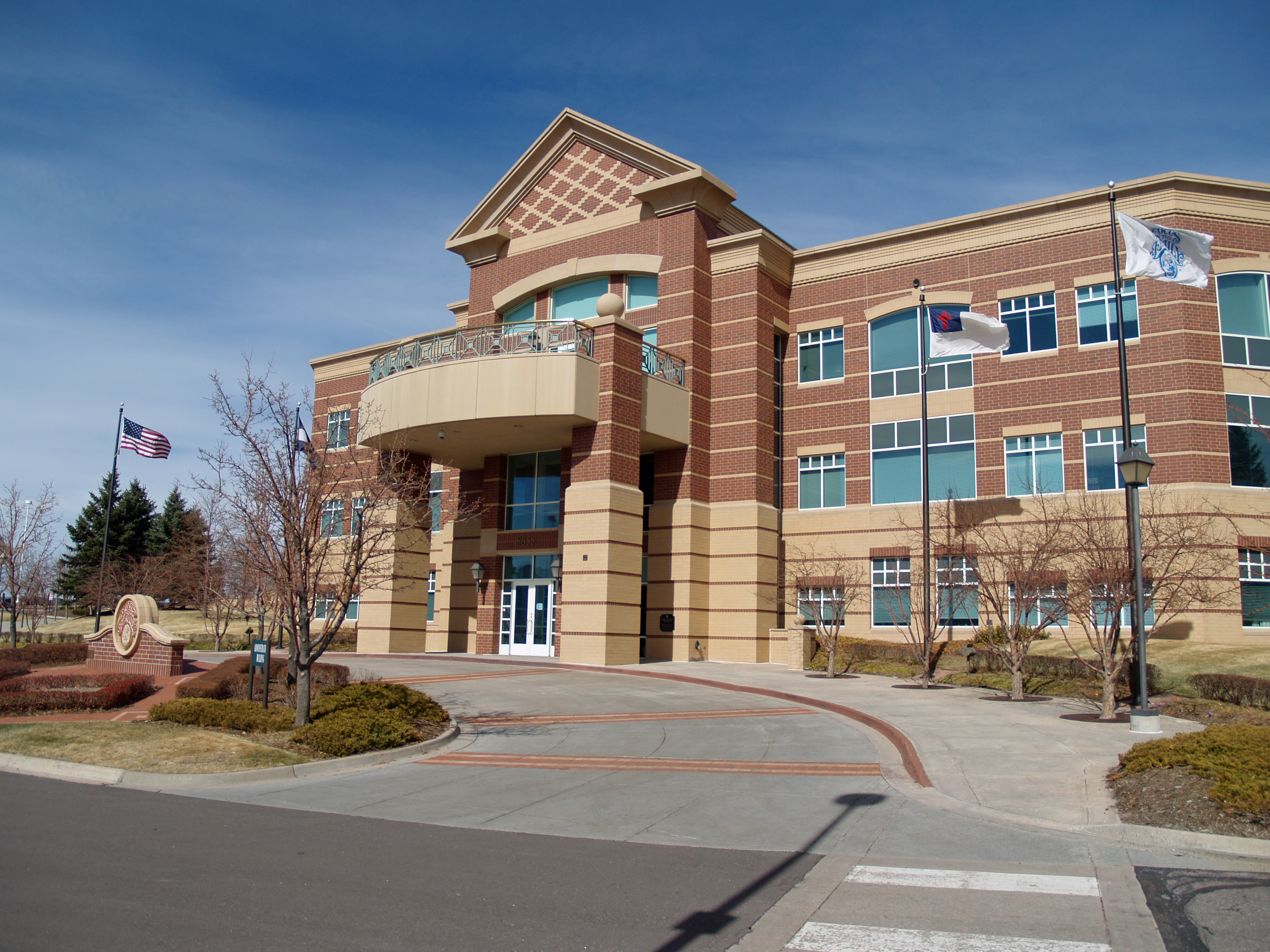
The administration building is one of four on the headquarters campus.

The Focus on the Family headquarters is a four building, 47-acre (19 ha) complex located off of Interstate 25 in northern Colorado Springs, Colorado, with its own ZIP Code (80995). The buildings consist of the Administration building, International building, Welcome Center and Operations building, and totals 526,070 square feet.

Focus on the Family's original headquarters were in Arcadia, California for the initial fourteen years following the time that James Dobson incorporated the company. The organization began with 500 square feet of office space and employed a single part-time secretary, according to the prior director of corporate affairs, Dan Wright. By 1984 Focus of the Family's Arcadia properties occupied 55,000 square feet across three buildings (though prior to a consolidation of their campus, they owned as many as seven individual buildings around the city) and employed 320 personnel.

In 1991, Focus moved its headquarters to the current location in Colorado Springs with 1,200 employees. Christopher Ott of Salon wrote in 1998 that the FOTF campus has "handsome new brick buildings, professional landscaping and even its own traffic signs." In 2002, the number of employees peaked at 1,400. By 2011, after years of layoffs, Focus had 650 employees remaining. As of 2026, Focus says it continues to employ hundreds of workers.
