= Freedom2b =

Australian LGBT charity

- Formation: 2004
- Founder: Anthony Venn-Brown; Phillip Wall
- Dissolved: 2018
- Legal status: charity (former)
- Location: Australia
- Website: https://freedom2b.org/

Freedom2b was an Australian-based network that supported LGBT people from Christian backgrounds. It helped them resolve issues of faith, sexuality, and gender identity while working to promote understanding and acceptance both in the church. Freedom2b accepted both religious and non-religious LGBTI people and does not promote a particular belief system. In 2018, the association ended its official activities.

== Purpose ==
The stated agenda of Freedom2b is to offer support, information and the opportunity to share with people who have similar experiences. Freedom2b offers support to LGBTI people through face-to-face meetings and offers information on same sex attraction from a scientific, psychological and biblical perspective. It also promotes dialogue with religious organizations to promote understanding and acceptance.

== History ==
Freedom2b was co-founded in 2004 by Anthony Venn-Brown and Phillip Wall. The first meetings of the organization were held in Surry Hills in Sydney. Venn-Brown released his autobiography A Life of Unlearning. The outpouring of interest prompted him to establish the network to give gay Christians a voice. “Up until this point there was no point of contact for the many thousands of people who were isolated.”

In 2011 Venn-Brown stepped down, with Michelle Kolev of the Melbourne chapter taking on the role of President. The year also saw the organisation re-brand from "freedom 2 b[e]" to "freedom2b".

In 2018, the association ended its official activities.

== Activities ==
Freedom2b conducted monthly meetings in a number of capital cities including Sydney, Melbourne, and Brisbane, and had an online forum where participants can share their stories and discuss issues relating to faith and sexuality. Freedom2b has marched in the Sydney Mardi Gras since 2007 and participated in the 2011 Mardi Gras under the theme of “Find Freedom”.

The organization supports a range of activities within the community that promote awareness and help people reconcile their faith and sexuality. The Australian Broadcasting Corporation interviewed a number of members of freedom2b members in 2009 on their experiences of being gay and Pentecostal, and several freedom2b members were also the subject of a 2009 photography exhibition by Iain Wallace entitled “Walking between Worlds.” Freedom2b has been involved in workshops on suicide prevention. Three members of freedom2b, Paul Martin, Anthony Venn-Brown, and Ben Gresham are featured in a documentary The Bedroom Commandments that looks at the relationship between religious faith and sexuality.

Freedom2b also offered a group for young people aged 18–30. Their aim is to offer a safe place for LGBTI youth and young adults from Christian backgrounds. The youth coordinators of freedom2b in 2008 were Ben Gresham in Sydney and Duane McKibben in Melbourne. The patrons of freedom2b in 2008 are the Hon. Michael Kirby AC, CMG, (a former justice of the High Court of Australia) and Reverend Dorothy McRae-McMahon.
