= Exodus International =

Defunct Christian conversion therapy organization

- Founded: 1976
- Founder: Frank Worthen; Michael Bussee; Gary Cooper; Ron Dennis; Greg Reid
- Dissolved: 2013
- Type: Nonprofit
- Registration no.: 52-1413470 (EIN)
- Location(s): Orlando, Florida, U.S. (1976–2003); San Rafael, California, U.S. (2003–2013)
- Members: 9
- Key people: Alan Chambers, former president
- Revenue: $1,118,268 (2010)
- Employees: 23 (2010)
- Website: exodusinternational.org (defunct)

Exodus International was a non-profit, interdenominational ex-gay Christian umbrella organization connecting organizations that sought to limit homosexual desires. Founded in 1976, Exodus International originally asserted that conversion therapy, the reorientation of same-sex attraction, was possible. In 2006, Exodus International had over 250 local ministries in the United States and Canada and over 150 ministries in 17 other countries. Although Exodus was formally an interdenominational Christian entity, it was most closely associated with Protestant and evangelical denominations.

In 2012, then-president Alan Chambers renounced conversion therapy, saying it did not work and was harmful. The following year, Chambers closed the organization and apologized for the "pain and hurt" participants of their programs had experienced. Several other prominent former members, including John Paulk, have made similar apologies. After the closure of Exodus International, many of its member ministries continued, either forming new networks, joining existing ones such as the Exodus Global Alliance, or operating independently.

== History ==
During the presidency of Sy Rogers in the 1990s, Exodus International had offices on five continents and declared that "all homosexual relationships are sinful."

=== Day of Truth ===
In 2007, Exodus International began supporting the Day of Truth, an event created by Alliance Defending Freedom (ADF) in 2005 that challenges homosexuality. In 2009, the ADF announced they had passed on their leadership role for the event to Exodus. In October 2010, Exodus announced they would no longer support the event. President Alan Chambers stated they realised they needed to "equip kids to live out biblical tolerance and grace while treating their neighbors as they'd like to be treated, whether they agree with them or not", adding that the Day of Truth was becoming too divisive. Chambers said that Exodus had not changed its position on homosexuality, rather they were reevaluating how to best communicate their message. Focus on the Family subsequently took leadership of the event, and renamed it the Day of Dialogue.

=== Love Won Out ===
In 2009, Exodus International purchased the Love Won Out conferences from Focus on the Family. The conferences' purpose was "to exhort and equip Christian churches to respond in a Christ-like way to the issue of homosexuality." Love Won Out maintained that "[t]he sin of homosexual behavior, like all sins, can be forgiven and healed by the grace revealed in the life and death of Christ. All sexual sin affects the human personality like no other sin, for sexual issues run deep into our character, and change is slow and uphill - but is possible nonetheless." Love Won Out ceased to exist when Exodus International closed.

=== Renunciation of conversion therapy ===
In January 2012, Alan Chambers announced during his address to a Gay Christian Network conference, that "the majority of people that I have met, and I would say the majority meaning 99.9% of them have not experienced a change in their orientation", and apologized for the previous Exodus slogan "Change Is Possible". While he believed that "any sexual activity outside a heterosexual, monogamous marriage is sinful according to the Bible", he was attempting to disassociate the group from "reparative therapy" and also step back from contentious political engagement. Speaking to The New York Times in July 2012, Chambers talked about how he believed gay people can have gay sex and still go to heaven. "But we've been asking people with same-sex attractions to overcome something in a way that we don't ask of anyone else [with other sins]."

In a shift in the organization's previous positions, Chambers stated in June 2012 that conversion therapy is potentially harmful to those participating and it does not work:

I do not believe that cure is a word that is applicable to really any struggle, homosexuality included, for someone to put out a shingle and say, "I can cure homosexuality"—that to me is as bizarre as someone saying they can cure any other common temptation or struggle that anyone faces on Planet Earth.

== Closure ==
On May 28, 2013, Exodus International withdrew from the Exodus Global Alliance. On June 19, following a vote of the seven member board of directors at the organization's annual meeting in Irvine, California, the board of directors announced the impending closure of Exodus International.

Alan Chambers said that the board made the move "after a year of dialogue and prayer about the organization's place in a changing culture." Chambers repudiated one part of the organization's mission in a nearly hour-long talk at Exodus International's 38th annual meeting:

I am sorry for the pain and hurt many of you have experienced. I am sorry that some of you spent years working through the shame and guilt you felt when your attractions didn't change. I am sorry we promoted sexual orientation change efforts and reparative theories about sexual orientation that stigmatized parents.

Chambers stated that his next ministry would be different: "Our goals are to reduce fear and come alongside churches to become safe, welcoming and mutually transforming communities".

Board member Tony Moore issued a statement that clarified that the decision is "not negating the ways God used Exodus to positively affect thousands of people", further explaining that "a new generation of Christians is looking for change—and they want it to be heard." The organization's local affiliates may continue to operate independently under a name other than Exodus.

Chambers appeared on Lisa Ling's Our America show, broadcast on the Oprah Winfrey Network, in a June 20, 2013, episode entitled "God and Gays". Ling stated in a media interview prior to the airing of the episode, "I think Alan was sincere in his apology. I think things are happening so quickly and he's going through a transition. Where they leave the organization has yet to be determined."

The decision of the three member board of directors resulted in the closure of Exodus International as an umbrella organization, but had no direct impact on the member ministries which continue to operate. Many have joined together to form two new networks, including Restored Hope Network; while others continue to operate independently.

Additionally, some former member ministries publicly expressed disagreement with the board of directors, Chambers, and his apologies.

A close affiliate to Exodus International was the National Association for Research & Therapy of Homosexuality (NARTH), who issued a statement saying the member ministries of Exodus "still exist and we imagine that they will always exist as long as we have individuals who find homosexual sex incongruent with their personal or religious values".

== Studies of Exodus participants ==
While there is an overwhelming scientific consensus that conversion therapy is both a pseudoscience and harmful to participants, several studies of Exodus participants, conducted by people in favor of conversion therapy and from an evangelical perspective, have concluded that the therapy could be successful. Such studies have often been countered and criticized for bias and inaccuracy, and the standards for which they measured "success".

=== Jones and Yarhouse ===
Professors Stanton L. Jones of the evangelical Christian Wheaton College and Mark Yarhouse authored a paper that studied whether people "who participate in focused religious ministries experience a change in their sexual orientation" and whether such programs are harmful.

Results found, from a sample of 73 participants (98 before dropouts), that 15% had successfully converted to heterosexuality, 23% "reported homosexual attraction to be present only incidentally" and 29% had "modest decreases in homosexual attraction". No significant change was reported by 27% of participants; 12% reported giving up on conversion therapy, and 8% subsequently identified as homosexual. Jones and Yarhouse's study found "no evidence that the type of attempt to change sexual orientation studied here is harmful."

==== Response ====
Dwight Panozzo from New York University stated that there were several flaws in the Jones and Yarhouse study, the most prominent of which was the decision not to exclude participants who were likely to benefit financially from the study finding in favor of conversion therapy. According to Panozzo, these participants would have been more likely to report successful results, thereby "undermining the validity of the findings". Panozzo also said while their methods used to conclude there was no harm caused by conversion therapy had "an impressive level of face validity", these findings could not be accepted. Among several other criticisms, Panozzo states that Jones and Yarhouse did not have a baseline from which to measure harm, adding that "from a research perspective, this [was] a cardinal and insurmountable error."

== Controversy ==
There have been several controversial incidents regarding Exodus and their leaders; Christianity Today reported in 2007 that scandals had become less frequent.

=== Michael Bussee and Gary Cooper ===
Michael Bussee, one of the founders of Exodus and Gary Cooper, a leader within the ministry of Exodus, left the group to be in a relationship with each other in 1979. They divorced their wives and participated in a commitment ceremony in 1982. Bussee and Cooper lived together until Cooper's death from AIDS-related illness in 1991.

In June 2007, Bussee issued an apology for his involvement in promoting orientation change through Exodus. Also apologizing were Jeremy Marks, former president of Exodus International Europe, and Darlene Bogle, the founder of Paraclete Ministries, an Exodus referral agency. The apology stated in part "Some who heard our message were compelled to try to change an integral part of themselves, bringing harm to themselves and their families." Bussee stated, "In the almost 40 years since I started Exodus International, I can honestly say that I have never met a gay person who became heterosexual through conversion therapy or ex-gay programs. Yes, some stayed celibate for a time. Some even married and said they were happy. But most of those marriages ended with very painful divorces."

=== John Paulk ===
In September 2000, John Paulk, who had been elected Chairman of the board of Exodus International North America since August 1995, was identified drinking at a Washington, D.C. gay bar. A patron recognized him and contacted Wayne Besen, an employee of the Human Rights Campaign, who came to the bar and confronted Paulk. Paulk denied who he was and gave an alias, but was photographed as he left the bar. When confronted by Besen about the incident and the photographs later, Paulk admitted being in the bar, but stated that he did not know it was a gay bar and had simply stopped in to use the restroom. He later conceded he had known it was a gay bar before entering. Paulk was subsequently removed as board chairman by Exodus.

In 2013, Paulk renounced his former cause, stating that his sexual orientation had never truly changed, that reparative therapy does not work and "does great harm to many people".

=== Billboard parody ===
In March 2006, Liberty Counsel, a law firm acting on behalf of Exodus International, sent cease-and-desist letters to bloggers Justin Watt and Mike Airhart, demanding they "immediately cease use" of an edited photograph on their respective blogs "or in any other form" which parodied an Exodus billboard. The original billboard image, obtained from Exodus's website, consisted of the message "Gay? Unhappy? www.exodus.to" while the parody image, created by Watt in September 2005, showed the same sign, substantially cropped, with the text altered to read "Straight? Unhappy? www.gay.com."

In response, Watt contacted the ACLU, who took his defence. Exodus decided against pursuing further legal action once the Exodus logo was removed from the parody. As a result of the media attention, more than 40 other websites began displaying the parody.

=== iPhone app ===
In 2011, Exodus International released an iPhone app which promoted the idea that homosexuality can be cured. In the app, Exodus quoted research by scientist Gary Remafedi. Remafedi, however, stated that Exodus had manipulated and misused his research, and wrote to Apple founder Steve Jobs and interim CEO Tim Cook informing them of this. On March 24, 2011, Apple spokesman Tom Neumayr stated: "We removed the Exodus International app from the App Store because it violates our developer guidelines by being offensive to large groups of people."

Petitions to both remove and keep the app were set up on Change.org. On March 24, 2011, The Register reported that while the petition to remove the app had received over 150,000 signatures, the counter petition to keep the app had only received 8 signatures.

=== Ugandan conference ===
In 2009, Exodus International board member Don Schmierer and two other evangelical Christians travelled to Uganda to speak at a conference on homosexuality, informing thousands of attendees that homosexuality was "evil" and could be "cured". A month later a Ugandan politician, with the help of the organizers of the conference, introduced what became known as the "Kill the Gays" bill. If passed, the bill would have made homosexuality punishable by death. Close to a year later, Chambers expressed regret for the organization's involvement, and spoke out against the proposed bill.

== See also ==
- Courage International
- Joel 2:25 International
- National Association for Research & Therapy of Homosexuality
- Restored Hope Network
