= Alan Chambers (activist) =

American ex-gay activist (born 1972)

Alan Manning Chambers (born February 21, 1972) is an American former ex-gay activist, mostly known for being the president of the ex-gay conversion therapy ministry Exodus International. After renouncing the mission of Exodus International he cofounded Speak. Love.

In 2013 Chambers repudiated Exodus International's mission in a nearly hour-long talk at the organization's 38th annual meeting. He co-founded Speak. Love. with two other former Exodus leaders later that year.

In 2026, Chambers plead "not guilty" to child solicitation charges.

== Background ==
Chambers promoted policies that in his view would preserve and protect traditional marriage and the family. He testified before the Massachusetts state judiciary committee on same-sex marriage. He was also a member of the Arlington Group, a coalition working to pass legislation against same-sex marriage.

Chambers stated that he had mostly overcome his attraction to men (although he did speak openly about his own ongoing sexual attraction to men); however, he rejects the term ex-gay. As of 2006 he was married to Leslie Chambers and had two adopted children. He traveled extensively and was a frequent speaker and guest lecturer at conferences, churches and college campuses. He debated at many university campuses, such as the University of California at Berkeley, Pepperdine University and Reformed Theological Seminary.

Prior to Exodus International's annual conference in 2012, Chambers stated, "I do not believe that cure is a word that is applicable to really any struggle, homosexuality included.... For someone to put out a shingle and say, 'I can cure homosexuality' — that to me is as bizarre as someone saying they can cure any other common temptation or struggle that anyone faces on Planet Earth." In July 2012, while appearing on NBC's Hardball, Chambers stated that he always believed the catchphrase "Pray away the gay" to be a lazy stereotype and one that he never used, as it invalidates the nature of the complex issue surrounding homosexuality. Chambers went on to tell host Michael Smerconish that he has same-sex attraction, and for anyone to say he does not have temptations, or that he could never be tempted, or does not have same-sex attraction is not true. He has admitted to having experienced attraction to both sexes.

In June 2013, he closed the organization with a public apology to the LGBT community, saying that "For quite some time we've been imprisoned in a worldview that's neither honoring toward our fellow human beings, nor biblical." He remarked that he will now seek to create "safe, welcoming and mutually transforming communities". In 2015, Chambers published a book entitled, My Exodus: From Fear to Grace.

== Personal life ==
As of 2026, Alan Chambers remains married to Leslie, whom he'd married in 1998. He has called his marriage "amazing".

In May 2026, he was arrested in Orange County, Florida, charged with solicitation of a minor, transmission of harmful material to minors, and unlawful use of a two-way communication device after a sting operation in which a detective identified himself as a 14-year-old boy. At the time, he was working as Vice President of Operations at John Craig and Current in Winter Park, Florida. It was announced that he was no longer a member of the Winter Park Chamber of Commerce at that time. In July 2026, he plead "not guilty" to the charges.

== Accolades ==
In 2011, World named Chambers as their "Daniel of the Year," for his stance on Christian issues. Chambers was listed in Charisma magazine as one of the top Christian leaders who represent the future of the American church.

== See also ==
- Ex-gay movement
