= Ex-gay movement =

Movement discouraging homosexuality

The ex-gay movement consists of people and organizations that encourage people to refrain from entering or pursuing same-sex relationships, to eliminate homosexual desires and to develop heterosexual desires, or to enter into a heterosexual relationship. Beginning with the founding of Love in Action and Exodus International in the mid-1970s, the movement saw rapid growth in the 1980s and 1990s before declining in the 2000s.

It relies on the involvement of individuals who formerly identified themselves as gay, lesbian, or bisexual but no longer do; these individuals may state either that they have eliminated their attraction to the same sex altogether or that they abstain from acting on such attraction.

After the collapse of Exodus International in 2013, a small number of ex-gay ministries continue as the Restored Hope Network. The movement's ongoing impact on conservative religious discourse can be seen in an aversion to use of the term gay to refer to sexual orientation and its substitute with the language of "same-sex attraction".

There have been various scandals related to this movement, including some self-claimed ex-gays having been found in same-sex relationships despite having denied this, as well as controversies over gay minors being forced to go to ex-gay camps against their will, and overt admissions by organizations related to the movement that conversion therapy does not work.

A large body of research and global scientific consensus indicates that being gay, lesbian, or bisexual is compatible with normal mental health and social adjustment. Because of this, major mental health professional organizations discourage and caution individuals against attempting to change their sexual orientation to heterosexual, and warn that attempting to do so can be harmful.

== Characteristics ==
Various ex-gay organizations have working definitions of change. Prior to disbanding and renouncing the idea of a cure, Exodus International described change as, "attaining abstinence from homosexual behaviors, lessening of homosexual temptations, strengthening their sense of masculine or feminine identity, correcting distorted styles of relating with members of the same and opposite gender". People Can Change defines change as, "any degree of change toward greater peace, satisfaction and fulfillment, and less shame, depression and darkness", and emphasizes that for most people, heterosexuality is not the ultimate goal. When the term ex-gay was introduced to professional literature in 1980, E. Mansell Pattison defined it as describing a person who had "experienced a basic change in sexual orientation". Some ex-gays advocate entering (or remaining) in a heterosexual marriage as part of the process. Some in mixed-orientation marriages acknowledge that their sexual attractions remain primarily homosexual, but seek to make their marriages work anyway.

Some people no longer identify as gay since they became Christians or with prayer, without going to conversion therapy.

== Objectives ==
Aside from achieving a degree of change in sexual orientation, the ex-gay movement pursues several broad goals and these include:

- coordination with individuals and organizations, particularly opponents of gay and lesbian civil equality to influence public perception and public policy;
- offering gays and lesbians a procedure that is claimed to solve many of their problems by making them heterosexual;
- promotion of ex-gay movement leaders as legitimate representatives in gay cultural/political discourse;
- the destigmatization of therapeutic attempts to change sexual orientation to undermine the American Psychological Association's long-standing position that homosexuality is not a mental disorder.

== Motivation of participants ==
The American Psychological Association reported that some ex-gay groups may help counteract and buffer minority stress, marginalization, and isolation in ways similar to other support groups, such as offering social support, fellowship, role models, and new ways to view a problem through unique philosophies or ideologies. Additionally, the same researchers also found that people joined ex-gay groups due to: a lack of other sources of social support; a desire for active coping, including both cognitive and emotional coping; and access to methods of sexual orientation identity exploration and reconstruction. The same report found that some have described the ex-gay groups as, "a refuge for those who were excluded both from conservative churches and from their families, because of their same-sex sexual attractions, and from gay organizations and social networks, because of their conservative religious beliefs". According to the APA report, "Ex-gay groups appear to relieve the distress caused by conflicts between religious values and sexual orientation and help participants change their sexual orientation identity, but not their sexual orientation". The APA goes on to report that some believed that by, "taking on 'ex-gay' cultural norms and language and finding a community that enabled and reinforced their primary religious beliefs, values, and concerns", they could resolve identity conflicts by:

- Adopting a new discourse or worldview.
- Engaging in a biographical reconstruction.
- Embracing a new explanatory model.
- Forming strong interpersonal ties.

One of the APA's sources for the report found that, "ex-gay groups recast homosexuality as an ordinary sin, and thus salvation was still achievable". Another one of their sources is summarized as having observed that, "such groups built hope, recovery, and relapse into an ex-gay identity, thus expecting same-sex sexual behaviors and conceiving them as opportunities for repentance and forgiveness". The APA report warns, however, that "some [ex-gay] groups may reinforce prejudice and stigma by providing inaccurate or stereotyped information about homosexuality".

== Ex-gay organizations ==
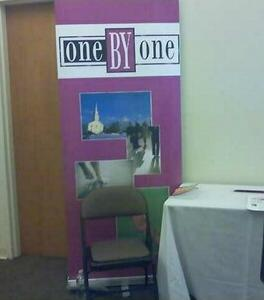
OneByOne booth at a Love Won Out conference

The first contemporary ex-gay ministry, Love in Action, was formed in 1973. Three years later, with other ex-gay organizations, it formed Exodus International, the largest ex-gay organization and the largest organization under the Exodus Global Alliance. In May 1983, during a conference in the Netherlands, a European chapter was founded. In June 2013, the Exodus board decided to cease operations, with president Alan Chambers apologizing for the pain and hurt the group had caused and saying that he no longer believed sexual orientation could be changed. Chambers apologized for what he identified as regrettable techniques, and the narrow message of a cure and marriage rather than a relationship with Christ for all. Shortly after, Chambers and his wife started Speak.Love., an organisation for promoting conversations on sexual orientation for all. In September 2014, Speak.Love. was merged into Chambers's personal website. Exodus Global Alliance, however, no longer affiliated with Exodus International, has continued operations.

Other ex-gay organizations cater to specific religious groups, such as Courage International for Catholics, North Star for the LDS Church, JONAH for Jews, Joel 2:25 International for Catholic and Protestant Christians and OneByOne for Presbyterians.

Some groups follow a specific technique, such as Homosexuals Anonymous, modeled after the Alcoholics Anonymous twelve-step program. Other ex-gay organizations include Parents and Friends of Ex-Gays and Gays.

In the United States, the organization The Changed Movement hosts public "Freedom March" events where ex-gays discuss their changes.

== People ==
=== People associated with the ex-gay movement ===
- Joe Dallas is the program director of Genesis Counseling and the author of six books on human sexuality.
- Donnie McClurkin wrote about his experience with homosexuality in his book, Eternal Victim, Eternal Victor. He describes himself as going through a process by which he became "saved and sanctified". McClurkin has been criticized for stating homosexuality is a curse. He speaks openly about sexual issues since becoming the biological father of a child with a woman to whom he was not married. He uses these experiences in his concerts and speaking engagements. In 2004, he sang at the Republican National Convention. The appearance generated criticism for the event organizers and McClurkin for his statements on homosexuality.
- Joseph Nicolosi was an American clinical psychologist, founder and director of the Thomas Aquinas Psychological Clinic in Encino, California, and a founder and former president of the National Association for Research and Therapy of Homosexuality (NARTH).
- Jeffrey Satinover is an American psychiatrist, psychoanalyst, and physicist. He is a member of the Scientific Advisory Committee of NARTH.
- Charles Socarides was an American psychiatrist, psychoanalyst, physician, educator, and author. He helped found NARTH in 1992.

=== People who no longer support the ex-gay movement ===
- John Paulk, then leader of Focus on the Family's Love Won Out conference and chairman of the board for Exodus International North America, was spotted visiting a Washington, D.C. gay bar in September 2000. He was photographed outside of the bar from behind by Wayne Besen, and later stepped down from the two organizations. In 2013, he formally apologized for his involvement in promoting the ex-gay concept and for the harm his work had done.
- Peterson Toscano, because he adhered to Conservative Christian beliefs, spent seventeen years as part of the ex-gay movement attempting to alter his sexual orientation through conversion therapy and faith-based ex-gay programs. In addition to receiving pastoral counseling, conversion therapy, and discipleship training, he attended several ex-gay programs, including Life Ministries in New York City (1983–1991) and the residential ex-gay program Love in Action in Memphis, Tennessee (July 1996 – October 1998). In April 2007, Toscano and Christine Bakke co-founded Beyond Ex-Gay, an organization that supports people who feel they have been wounded by such organizations.
- Anthony Venn-Brown is a former Australian evangelist in the Assemblies of God and an author whose book describes his experience in Australia's first ex-gay program. Venn-Brown co-founded Freedom2b which offers support to LGBT people from church backgrounds and who have been displaced from the ex-gay movement. In 2007 he co-ordinated the release of a statement from five Australian ex-gay leaders who publicly apologized for their past actions.
- John Smid was the leader of Love in Action in Memphis. He resigned that position in 2008, and in 2010 apologized for any harm that he had caused, noting that his teen program "further wounded teens that were already in a very delicate place in life". He has announced that he is still homosexual and admitted never seeing a man successfully converting to heterosexuality in his group.
- Warren Throckmorton is a past president of the American Mental Health Counselors Association. He wrote and produced the documentary I Do Exist about ex-gay people, but subsequently came to "believe that categorical change in sexual attractions, especially for men, is rare" and repudiated some of the claims he made in the film.

== Controversy ==
=== Sexual orientation change efforts ===
Prior to disbanding, Exodus International recommended to their members that they undertake sexual orientation change efforts, such as conversion therapy. Exodus warned against going to counselors who tell a patient that they "can definitely eliminate all attractions to your same gender, or that you can definitely acquire heteroerotic attractions". Evergreen International did not advocate any particular form of therapy, and warned that "therapy will likely not be a cure in the sense of erasing all homosexual feelings".

Sexual orientation change efforts are controversial and the American Psychological Association reported that, "the available evidence, from both early and recent studies, suggests that although sexual orientation is unlikely to change, some individuals modified their sexual orientation identity (i.e., individual or group membership and affiliation, self-labeling) and other aspects of sexuality (i.e. values and behavior)". Virtually all major mental health organizations have adopted policy statements cautioning the profession and the public against treatments that purport to change sexual orientation.

In 2012, the Pan American Health Organization (the North and South American branch of the World Health Organization) released a statement cautioning against services that purport to "cure" people with non-heterosexual orientations as they lack medical justification and represent a serious threat to the health and well-being of affected people, and noted that the global scientific and professional consensus is that homosexuality is a normal and natural variation of human sexuality and cannot be regarded as a pathological condition. The Pan American Health Organization further called on governments, academic institutions, professional associations and the media to expose these practices and to promote respect for diversity. The World Health Organization affiliate further noted that gay minors have sometimes been forced to attend these "therapies" involuntarily, being deprived of their liberty and sometimes kept in isolation for several months, and that these findings were reported by several United Nations bodies. Additionally, the Pan American Health Organization recommended that such malpractices be denounced and subject to sanctions and penalties under national legislation, as they constitute a violation of the ethical principles of health care and violate human rights that are protected by international and regional agreements.

In March 2018, the European parliament called on memberstates of the European Union to stop conversion therapies.

=== Controversy over teenagers ===
A controversial aspect of the ex-gay movement has been the focus of some ex-gay organizations on gay teenagers, including occasions where teenagers have been forced to attend ex-gay camps by their parents. A 2006 report by the National Gay and Lesbian Taskforce outlined evidence that ex-gay and conversion therapy groups were at the time increasingly focusing on children. Several legal researchers have responded to these events by arguing that parents who force their children into aggressive conversion therapy programs are committing child abuse under various state statutes.

One case of emancipation involved Lyn Duff. Duff was admitted to Rivendell Psychiatric Center in West Jordan, Utah on December 19, 1991, at age 15, after being involuntarily transported there at her mother's behest. Duff was subjected to a regimen of conversion therapy, including aversion therapy, hypnosis, psychotropic drugs, solitary confinement, therapeutic messages linking lesbian sex with "the pits of hell", behavior modification techniques, unreasonable forms of punishment for small infractions, and "positive peer pressure" group sessions in which patients demeaned and belittled each other for both real and perceived inadequacies. On May 19, 1992, after 168 days of incarceration, Duff escaped from Rivendell and traveled to San Francisco, where she lived on the streets and in safe houses. In 1992, Duff initiated legal action against the facility and her mother.

The ex-gay organization Love in Action was involved in a controversy surrounding a teenager. In July 2005, The New York Times ran a feature story about 16-year-old Zachary Stark, whose parents forced him to attend an ex-gay camp run by the group. In July 2005, Stark was released from the camp. An investigation of the camp by the Tennessee Department of Children's Services did not uncover signs of child abuse. In September 2005, Tennessee authorities discovered that unlicensed staff had been administering prescription drugs. A settlement was reached shortly thereafter. Love in Action closed the camp in 2007.

== See also ==
- American Family Association v. City and County of San Francisco
- Detransition
- Ego-dystonic sexual orientation
- Environment and sexual orientation
- Ex-ex-gay
- National Association for Research & Therapy of Homosexuality
- Sexaholics Anonymous
- Side A, Side B, Side X, Side Y (theological views)
