= Dissent from Catholic teaching on homosexuality =

Dissent from the Catholic Church's teaching on homosexuality has come with a number of practical and ministerial arguments from both the clergy and the laity of the Catholic Church.

The Catholic Church teaches that:

- the reasons some people are gay is mysterious, and that the portion of people who are gay is "not negligible"
- gay people should be accepted with respect, compassion, and sensitivity
- homosexual acts are gravely disordered (along with masturbation, fornication, and other sexual sins)
- gay people are called to celibacy
- gay people are made in the image of God and loved by God
- being gay is not a sin in and of itself
- people should not be able to enter same-sex civil marriages

A number of Roman Catholic groups, laypeople, and clergy members have sought to change Church teaching. They have advocated for:

- acceptance of consensual sexual acts between adults of the same sex
- provision of employee benefits and health insurance by Catholic employers to civil same-sex partners of employees
- gay marriage, civil and/or religious.
- further support and ministry to gay Catholics

Some groups have led protests against Church teaching. Protests have included vandalizing churches, disrupting Masses, and desecrating the Eucharist. In several cases they have faced censure or discipline from the Church authorities.

Some in the Catholic laity also believe homosexual activity is morally acceptable and that gay relationships should be recognized. Some Catholics accept Catholic teaching on the morality of homosexual activity, but object to the Catholic Church's pastoral treatment of gay Catholics, either for being too stringent or for being too lenient.

== Objections to Church teaching ==
There have historically been two main camps of theologians who dissent from the Church's teaching. The first accepts the church's claims that heterosexuality is the norm and moral ideal, but believes that departure from that ideal may be acceptable and that it need not be enforced with public policy. The second questions or rejects the claim that heterosexuality is more natural or moral and argue that it is not "unnatural" for a gay person to desire sex with someone of the same gender and so those relationships should be celebrated as heterosexual ones are.

Some who disagree with the Church's condemnation of sexual acts between members of the same sex make the general argument that it emphasizes the physical dimension of the act at the expense of higher moral, personal, and spiritual goals. Some gay and lesbian Catholics and their supporters also feel that the practice of total, life-long sexual denial risks personal isolation.

After the promulgation of the 2023 declaration Fiducia supplicans, a third camp of dissent emerged, consisting of theologians and bishops who adhered to Catholic moral teaching on homosexual acts but objected to the document's teaching that persons in homosexual relationships could receive pastoral blessings outside a formal liturgical context.

== Movements ==
=== DignityUSA ===
DignityUSA was founded in the United States in 1969 as the first group for gay and lesbian Catholics shortly after the Stonewall riots. It developed from the ministry of Father Patrick Xavier Nidorf, an Augustinian priest. It set out the belief that gay Catholics can "express our sexuality physically, in a unitive manner that is loving, life-giving, and life-affirming." It also seeks to "work for the development of sexual theology leading to the reform of [the Church's] teachings and practices regarding human sexuality, and for the acceptance of gay, lesbian, bisexual and transgender peoples as full and equal members of the one Christ." In 1980, the Association of Priests in the Archdiocese of Chicago honored the Chicago branch of Dignity as the organization of the year. Meetings were initially held in San Diego and Los Angeles, before the organization ultimately became headquartered in Boston. It later spread to Canada. With the publication in 1987 of "On the Pastoral Care of Homosexual Persons," which instructed bishops not to provide facilities for organizations that did not uphold official Catholic teaching on homosexuality, Catholic bishops in Atlanta, Buffalo, Brooklyn, Pensacola and Vancouver immediately excluded Dignity chapters, and "within a few months the organization was unwelcome on church property anywhere."

After On the Pastoral Care of Homosexual Persons was published, Dignity began staging a series of protests in what they called the Cathedral Project. They would respectfully participate in Mass until the homily began. At this point they would stand up and turn their backs on the priest. They were then escorted out of the church by ushers while police stood by in the back of the church.

=== Call to Action ===
Following a conference in Detroit in 1976 a group called Call to Action (CTA) was established to advocate a variety of changes in the Catholic Church, including in the Church's teaching on sexual matters such as homosexuality. It drew its mission from the US Bishops' 1976 Call To Action conference, in response to the Second Vatican Council, and in particular to its challenge to lay Catholics who had tended to defer initiatives entirely to the clergy. In 1996, the bishop of Lincoln, Fabian Bruskewitz, subsequently excommunicated all members of the group within his diocese. An appeal by the Nebraska Chapter was rejected by the Congregation for Bishops in 2006. Nevertheless, the organization has continued with a wide range of activities including annual conferences and regional groups, and in 2013 it attempted to broaden its appeal under the tagline "Inspire Catholics, Transform Church."

=== New Ways Ministry ===
Two of the best-known advocates for a more accepting position on homosexuality within the Catholic fold have been the Salvatorian priest Robert Nugent and the School Sister of Notre Dame nun Jeannine Gramick, who established New Ways Ministry in 1977 in the United States of America. This was in response to Bishop Francis Mugavero of Brooklyn who had invited them to reach out in "new ways" to lesbian and gay Catholics. As early as February 1976, Mugavero issued a pastoral letter entitled "Sexuality: God's Gift," defending the legitimate rights of all people, including those who were gay and lesbian. He said that they had been "subject to misunderstanding and at times unjust discrimination." In addition to gay and lesbian Catholics, the letter also spoke to the widowed, adolescents, the divorced, and those having sexual relations outside of marriage, stating: "we pledge our willingness to help you ... to try to find new ways to communicate the truth of Christ because we believe it will make you free." These sentiments inspired the pastoral efforts by the co-founders to build bridges between differing constituencies in Catholicism.

In 1981, New Ways Ministry held its first national symposium on homosexuality and the Catholic Church, but Archbishop James Hickey of Washington, D.C., wrote to Catholic bishops and communities, asking them not to support the event. Despite this, more than fifty Catholic groups endorsed the program.

Both Nugent and Grammick were later formally disciplined in 1999 when the Vatican imposed lifetime bans on any pastoral work involving gay people, declaring that the positions they advanced "do not faithfully convey the clear and constant teaching of the Catholic Church" and "have caused confusion among the Catholic people." The move made Nugent and Gramick "folk heroes in liberal circles," where official teaching was seen as outdated and lacking compassion. Similarly, the American bishops Thomas Gumbleton of Detroit and Matthew Clark of Rochester, New York, were criticized for their association with New Ways Ministry, and their alleged distortion of the theological concept of the primacy of conscience as an alternative to the actual teaching of the Catholic Church.

=== Rainbow Sash Movement ===
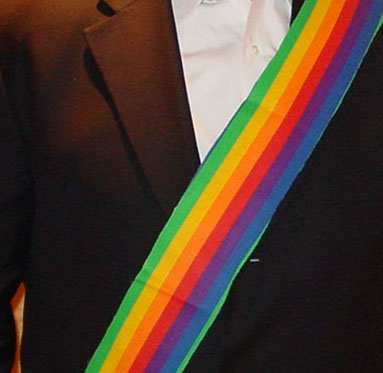
The Rainbow Sash itself is a strip of a rainbow-colored fabric which is worn over the left shoulder and is put on at the beginning of the Liturgy. The members go up to receive Eucharist

The Rainbow Sash Movement covers two separate organizations created by and advanced by practicing LGBT Catholics who believe they should be able to receive Holy Communion. The sash was first worn at a Mass in London, although the movement moved its focus to Melbourne, Australia, in 1998. It has been most active in the United States, England, and Australia. Part of the movement split to form the Rainbow Sash Alliance USA, based in Minneapolis in 2004.

The Rainbow Sash itself is a strip of a rainbow colored fabric which is worn over the left shoulder and is put on at the beginning of the Liturgy. The members go up to receive Communion. If denied, they go back to pews and remain standing, but if the Eucharist is received then they go back to the pew and kneel in the traditional way. Supporters of the sash were keen to use it as a "symbol of pride, dignity, and challenge", but sought to reassure clergy that their actions would be "prayerful, reverent, and peaceful in word and action".

In 1998 members of the movement attended Mass at the cathedral in Melbourne, where Cardinal Pell refused them all Communion before publicly rebuking their actions to the applause of other parishioners. Members of the movement also took action during Mass in Chicago in 2001 where they were likewise refused. However, members did receive Communion from officiating priests in Chicago, Dallas, Los Angeles, Rochester, NY, New York City, New Orleans, St. Cloud, Minnesota, and St. Paul in 2003.

In 2005, Archbishop Harry Joseph Flynn, bishop of the Archdiocese of Saint Paul and Minneapolis, said that the decision to take Communion lay with individual Catholics as to their state of grace and freedom from mortal sin, but that receiving Communion should not be used as a protest.

Commenting on why he refused to administer communion, Cardinal Francis Arinze, said that members of the Rainbow Sash Movement disqualified themselves from Communion by displaying their opposition to the Church's teaching. Chicago Cardinal Francis George has said that "no one wants to refuse to give Communion; it's a painful thing to do. The policy, however, is about the worship of God, which is not to be instrumentalized or manipulated by any group." Arguing that because the "basic criterion for receiving Communion is unity in faith and in moral discipline," the bishops of the United States have a policy "to refuse Communion to anyone who used its reception as an occasion to protest."

The movement in Illinois also planned to hold in a cathedral prayer for legalization of same-sex marriage in 2013, an initiative that Bishop Paprocki of Springfield called blasphemous.

=== Catholics United ===
Catholics United was formed in 2005 in the United States as a non-profit, non-partisan political organization aimed at "changing the narrative" concerning the engagement of religious belief in public politics by pushing for progressive policies. It has no official status within the Catholic Church, but has had a significant effect on the religious and political debate in the U.S.

In March 2010, former director Chris Korzen appeared on CNN to challenge the Archdiocese of Washington, DC's protest of a law requiring employers to grant benefits to same-sex partners. In May 2010, Catholics United criticized a Boston-area Catholic school's decision to deny admission to the child of a lesbian couple. It has also criticized the Catholic Church for its opposition to same-sex marriage, and for breaking ties to the Boy Scouts of America when the latter changed its policy to reach out to gay members.

=== Other gay-positive Catholic groups ===
There are other groups operating around the world. Some organize prayer meetings and retreats and make common cause in their desire to maintain their Catholic faith without hiding their sexuality. Some have called for official recognition of permanent partnerships as an effective way to curb homosexual promiscuity. In Germany there is "Homosexuelle und Kirche" (HuK); in France, "David et Jonathan" (with 25 local branches); in Spain, "Coordinadora Gai-Lesbiana"; in Italy there are a number of groups based in different parts of the country—"Davide e Gionata" (Turin), "Il Guado" (Milan), "La Parola" (Vicenza), "L'Incontro" (Padua), "Chiara e Francesco" (Udine), "L'Archipelago" (Reggio Emilia), "Il Gruppo" (Florence), "Nuova Proposta" (Rome), and "Fratelli dell' Elpis" (Catanaia); in the Netherlands, "Stichting Dignity Nederland"; in Mexico, "Ottra Ovejas"; and in South Africa, "Pilgrims."

== Clergy ==
In 1578, a Franciscan friar was publicly whipped and imprisoned for a year in Rome after arguing homosexual love could be "holy and just".

In 1971, Catholic priest Charles Curran wrote that while committed same-sex relationships (not excepting those with include physical sex) fell short of the ideal, they should be considered good for people with a homosexual orientation. In a letter of 25 July 1986, the Congregation for the Doctrine of the Faith rebuked Curran for his published work and informed the Catholic University of America in Washington that he would "no longer be considered suitable nor eligible to exercise the function of a professor of Catholic theology." Cardinal Joseph Ratzinger, the Prefect of the Congregation, expressed the hope that "this regrettable, but necessary, outcome to the Congregation's study might move you to reconsider your dissenting positions and to accept in its fullness the teaching of the Catholic Church." This event "widened the gulf" between the Catholic episcopacy and academia in the United States.

Also in 1986, Archbishop Raymond Hunthausen of Seattle was required to transfer authority concerning ministry to homosexuals to his auxiliary bishop. Hunthausen had earlier been investigated by the Congregation for the Doctrine of the Faith for allowing Dignity, the association for gay Catholics, to hold Mass in Seattle cathedral on the grounds that "They're Catholics too. They need a place to pray." As a result, according to John L. Allen, "bishops had been put on notice that pastoral ministry to homosexuals, unless it is based on clear condemnation of homosexual conduct, invites serious trouble with Rome."

James Alison, an English priest and formerly a member of the Dominican Order, has also argued that the teaching of the Congregation for the Doctrine of the Faith On the Pastoral Care of Homosexual Persons regarding gay people is incompatible with the Gospel, and states that "it cannot in fact be the teaching of the Church." In A Question of Truth, the Dominican priest Gareth Moore states that "there are no good arguments, from either Scripture or natural law, against what have come to be known as homosexual relationships. The arguments put forward to show that such relationships are immoral are bad."

Father John J. McNeill has written that since gay people experience their sexual orientation as innately created, to believe that it is therefore a tendency towards evil would require believing in a sadistic God; and that it is preferable to believe that this element of Church teaching is mistaken in arguing that God would behave in such a way.

On 9 September 2022, over 80% of German bishops at the Synodal Way supported a document calling for a "re-evaluation of homosexuality" and for making changes to the Catechism. (Note: Supporting bishops are archbishop Reinhard Marx from Roman Catholic Archdiocese of Munich and Freising, bishop Karl-Heinz Wiesemann from Roman Catholic Diocese of Speyer, bishop Franz Jung, from Roman Catholic Diocese of Würzburg, archbishop Heiner Koch from Roman Catholic Archdiocese of Berlin, archbishop Stefan Heße from Roman Catholic Archdiocese of Hamburg, bishop Heinrich Timmerevers from Roman Catholic Diocese of Dresden–Meissen, bishop Michael Gerber from Roman Catholic Diocese of Fulda, Gerhard Feige from Roman Catholic Diocese of Magdeburg, bishop Helmut Dieser from Roman Catholic Diocese of Aachen, bishop Heiner Wilmer from Roman Catholic Diocese of Hildesheim, bishop Franz-Josef Hermann Bode from Roman Catholic Diocese of Osnabrück, bishop Felix Genn from Roman Catholic Diocese of Münster, bishop Georg Bätzing from Roman Catholic Diocese of Limburg, bishop Franz-Josef Overbeck from Roman Catholic Diocese of Essen, bishop Stephan Ackermann from Roman Catholic Diocese of Trier, bishop Peter Kohlgraf from Roman Catholic Diocese of Mainz, bishop Gebhard Fürst from Roman Catholic Diocese of Rottenburg-Stuttgart, auxiliary bishop Josef Holtkotte from Roman Catholic Archdiocese of Paderborn, auxiliary bishop Karl Borsch from Roman Catholic Diocese of Aachen, auxiliary bishop Ludger Schepers from Roman Catholic Diocese of Essen, auxiliary bishop Christoph Hegge from Roman Catholic Diocese of Münster, auxiliary bishop Gerhard Schneider from Roman Catholic Diocese of Rottenburg-Stuttgart, auxiliary bishop Karl Heinz Diez from Roman Catholic Diocese of Fulda, auxiliary bishop Peter Birkhofer from Roman Catholic Archdiocese of Freiburg, auxiliary bishop Reinhard Hauke from Roman Catholic Diocese of Erfurt, auxiliary bishop Udo Bentz from Roman Catholic Diocese of Mainz, auxiliary bishop Christian Würtz from Roman Catholic Archdiocese of Freiburg, auxiliary bishop Franz Josef Gebert from Roman Catholic Diocese of Trier, auxiliary bishop Heinz Günter Bongartz from Roman Catholic Diocese of Hildesheim, auxiliary bishop Herwig Gössel from Roman Catholic Archdiocese of Bamberg, auxiliary bishop Horst Eberlein from Roman Catholic Archdiocese of Hamburg, auxiliary bishop Johannes Wübbe from Roman Catholic Diocese of Osnabrück, auxiliary bishop Matthäus Karrer from Roman Catholic Diocese of Rottenburg-Stuttgart, auxiliary bishop Matthias König from Roman Catholic Archdiocese of Paderborn, auxiliary bishop Robert Brahm from Roman Catholic Diocese of Trier, auxiliary bishop Thomas Maria Renz from Roman Catholic Diocese of Rottenburg-Stuttgart, auxiliary bishop Ulrich Boom from Roman Catholic Diocese of Würzburg, auxiliary bishop Wilfried Theising from Roman Catholic Diocese of Münster, auxiliary bishop Wilhelm Zimmermann from Roman Catholic Diocese of Essen and auxiliary bishop Wolfgang Bischof from Roman Catholic Archdiocese of Munich and Freising.)

The Flemish bishops of the Belgian bishops conference published on 20 September 2022 a liturgical document for the blessing of same-sex unions.

== Publications ==
=== 1970s ===
In 1976, John J. McNeill, an American Jesuit and co-founder of Dignity, published The Church and the Homosexual, which challenged the Church's prohibition of same-sex activity. It received significant media attention, and argued for a change in Church teaching and that homosexual relationships should be judged by the same standard as heterosexual ones. The work had received permission from McNeill's Jesuit superiors prior to printing but, in 1977, the permission was retracted at the order of the Vatican, and McNeill was ordered by Cardinals Joseph Ratzinger and Franjo Šeper not to write or speak publicly about homosexuality. In a statement, McNeill responded that this approach risked exacerbating the AIDS crisis, as "gay men most likely to act out their sexual needs in an unsafe, compulsive way, and therefore expose themselves to the HIV virus, are precisely those who have internalised the self-hatred that their religions impose on them." In 1986, the Society of Jesus expelled him for "pertinacious disobedience" from the Order, as punishment for openly ministering to gay and lesbian Catholics. McNeill remained a priest until his death but was not permitted to say Mass thereafter.

In 1977, a collective theological study on human sexuality was published, after being commissioned in 1972 by the Catholic Theological Society of America. The Society, however, did not approve the study after members of its board of directors criticized its scholarship, reflecting tensions between conservative and revisionist theologians about how the Church should approach the issue. Reaction to the publication of the report demonstrated that division and dissent from the Church's teaching on sexuality was common among United States theologians, even within the Catholic Theological Society of America itself. The British academic, John Cornwell, writing about the episode in 2001 explained that the theology contained within the report was contentious because it extended the Vatican II focus on the procreative and unitive purposes of marital sexuality, to additionally emphasise the creative and integrative aspects. He went on to criticize the "oversimplification of the natural law theory of St. Thomas," and argued that the Church should recognize that "homosexuals enjoy the same rights and incur the same obligations as the heterosexual majority."

=== 1980s ===
In 1983, the Congregation for the Doctrine of the Faith attempted unsuccessfully to block publication of Father Robert Nugent's book, A Challenge to Love: Gay and Lesbian Catholics in the Church, although Cardinal Ratzinger did succeed in forcing Bishop Walter Sullivan of Richmond to at least remove his name from it, where previously the latter had lent his support. Nugent had established the gay-positive New Ways Ministry in 1977 with Sister Jeannine Gramick to reach out to gay and lesbian Catholics, but was stopped from administering the sacraments in 1983 after complaints from conservative clerics.

In 1984, Cardinal Ratzinger asked Archbishop Gerety of Newark to withdraw his imprimatur from Sexual Morality by Philip S. Keane, and the Paulist Press ceased its publication. Keane had stated that homosexuality should not be considered absolutely immoral but only "if the act was placed without proportionate reason." The Catholic tradition had suffered "historical distortions," Keane argued, and should be "ever open to better expressions."

In 1986, Cardinal Ratzinger wrote to Bishop Matthew Clark of Rochester, instructing him to remove his imprimatur from a book aimed at parents talking to children, Parents Talk Love: A Catholic Handbook on Sexuality written by Father Matthew Kawiak and Susan Sullivan, and which included information on homosexuality.

== Gay marriage and unions ==
=== United States ===
In 2003, fewer than 35% of American Catholics supported same-sex marriage. However, a report by the Public Religion Research Institute on the situation in 2013 found that during that decade support for same-sex marriage has risen 22 percentage points among Catholics to 57%: 58% among white Catholics, 56% among Hispanic, with white Catholics more likely to offer "strong" support. Among Catholics who were regular churchgoers, 50% supported, 45% opposed. A spokesperson for DignityUSA suggested that Catholic support for gay marriage was due to the religion's tradition of social justice, the importance of the family, and better education.

In 2012, a group of sixty-three former Catholic priests in the USA publicly announced their support for Referendum 74, which would make Washington the nation's seventh state to legalize marriage between same-sex couples. In a statement, they said: "We are uneasy with the aggressive efforts of Catholic bishops to oppose R-74 and want to support the 71 percent of Catholics (Public Religion Research Institute) who support civil marriage for gays as a valid Catholic position."

In several cases, clergy or laypeople have been fired from jobs at Catholic schools or universities because of their support for LGBT rights campaigns, or their marriages to partners of the same sex. In one case, a Jesuit high school refused to fire a teacher after he entered into a gay marriage. As result, the local bishop designated the school as no longer Catholic. In the United States, more than 50 people have reported losing their jobs at Catholic institutions since 2010 over their sexual orientation or identity, according to New Ways Ministries.

=== Ireland, England, and Wales ===
In 2006, Father Bernard Lynch became the first Catholic priest to undertake a civil partnership in the Republic of Ireland. He had previously had his relationship blessed in a ceremony in 1998 by an American Cistercian monk. He was subsequently expelled from his religious order in 2011 and legally wed his husband in 2016.

=== Germany ===
In January 2018, German bishop Franz-Josef Bode of the Roman Catholic Diocese of Osnabrück said in an interview with German journalists that blessing of same-sex unions in Roman Catholic churches in Germany is possible, as did German Cardinal Reinhard Marx in February 2018. German Bishop Franz-Josef Bode has argued that debate should begin on permitting the blessing of same-sex unions in Catholic churches in Germany.

In May 2021 and May 2022, blessings for same sex marriages were held in over 100 Roman Catholic churches in Germany, including those in the cathedral of Magdeburg where Bishop Ludger Schepers was present.

Cardinal Rainer Woelki, the Archbishop of Berlin, has noted the values of fidelity and reliability found in gay relationships. Over 260 Catholic theologians, particularly from Germany, Switzerland and Austria, signed a memorandum in January and February 2011, called Church 2011. It said that the Church's esteem for marriage and celibacy "does not require the exclusion of people who responsibly live out love, faithfulness, and mutual care in same-sex partnerships or in a remarriage after divorce."

On 9 September 2022, over 80% of German bishops at the Synodal Path supported a document calling for a "re-evaluation of homosexuality" and for making changes to the Catechism.

On March 11, 2023, the Synodal Path with support of over 80 percentage of German Roman Catholic bishops allowed blessing ceremonies for same-sex couples in all 27 German Roman Catholic diocese. In April 2025, Roman Catholic bishop conference published a manual for blessing ceremonies for same-sex unions.

=== Switzerland ===
In October 2014, Wendelin Bucheli, a priest in Bürglen in the west of Switzerland, was removed from his diocese by the local bishop after performing a blessing for a lesbian couple. He said he had discussed it with other members of the clergy before making the decision to acknowledge the relationship.

== Lay opinion ==
=== United States ===
The United States has the fourth largest Catholic population in the world. Research conducted by the Public Religion Research Institute has indicated that Catholics who leave the Church are more likely than those who leave other religions to say the reason was concern about "negative religious treatment of gay and lesbian people".

A 2011 report by the same organisation found that 73% of American Catholics favoured anti-discrimination laws, 63% supported the right of gay people to serve openly in the military, and 60% favoured allowing same-sex couples to adopt children. The report also found Catholics to be more critical than other religious groups about how their church is handling the issue.

In June 2015, data from Pew Research suggested that 66% of American Catholics think it is acceptable for children to be brought up by with gay parents. More generally, 70% thought it acceptable for a gay couple to cohabit. Less than half believed that homosexuality should be regarded as a sin (44% of Catholics compared to 62% of Protestants); and a majority would like the Church to be more flexible toward those who are in same-sex relationships, including the right to have marriages recognised.

In August 2015, a poll jointly commissioned by the Public Religion Research Institute and the Religion News Service was released suggesting that on issues such as LGBT rights there is "a widening ideological gulf between Catholic leadership and people in the pews," as well as a more progressive attitude among Catholics compared to the US population more generally: 60% of Catholics favor allowing gay and lesbian couples to marry legally, compared to 55% of Americans as a whole. Most Catholics (53%) said they did not believe same-sex marriage violated their religious beliefs; 76% of Catholics also said that they favored laws that would protect LGBT people from discrimination (alongside 70% of Americans overall). Finally, around 65% of Catholics oppose policies which permit business owners the right to refuse service to customers who are LGBT by citing religious concerns (compared to 57% of Americans).

=== Elsewhere ===
A 2014 poll commissioned by the US Spanish-language network Univision of more than 2,000 Catholics in 12 countries (Uganda, Spain, the US, Brazil, Argentina, France, Mexico, Italy, Colombia, Poland, the Philippines, and the DRC) found that two thirds of respondents were opposed to the idea of civil same-sex marriage, and around one third was in favor. However, the level of resistance varied between economically developing and developed countries, with 99% of respondents opposed in Uganda and the Democratic Republic of Congo; but a majority in favor in Spain (63%) and the US (54%). Additionally, in all countries a majority of those polled said they did not think the Catholic Church should perform marriages between two people of the same sex—although the results again ranged with support strongest in Spain (43% in favour) to Uganda (99% against).

In January 2014 the former president of Ireland, Mary McAleese, strongly criticized the Catholic Church's approach to homosexuality in a lecture to the Royal Society of Edinburgh: "I don't like my church's attitude to gay people. I don't like 'love the sinner, hate the sin'. If you are the so-called sinner, who likes to be called that?" Her comments were welcomed by the Irish Association of Catholic Priests.

The German bishops conference reported in February 2014 that in Germany "the Church's statements on premarital sexual relations, homosexuality, on those divorced and remarried, and on birth control ... are virtually never accepted, or are expressly rejected in the vast majority of cases"; and that there was "a 'marked tendency' among Catholics to accept legal recognition of same-sex unions as 'a commandment of justice' and they felt the Church should bless them, although most did not want gay marriage to be legalised."

A YouGov poll held in the United Kingdom in 2015 found that Catholics had a more liberal attitude towards gay marriage than Protestants, although both groups are less accepting on the issues than the public as a whole: 50% of Catholics support gay marriage (compared to 45% of Protestants, and 66% of people in the UK as a whole).

== Protests ==
Over recent decades a number of gay rights activists and supporters have protested inside and outside of Catholic church buildings. In many cases such protestors were Catholic, yet angry at feelings of marginalization. There was concern that the Church's teaching on homosexuality and the use of condoms had contributed to the AIDS crisis. As the number of deaths of gay and bisexual men rose rapidly during the 1980s, a sense of "urgency" to take action developed; activists argued that this was "a necessary step in fighting the war on AIDS and homophobia".

=== ACTUP ===
==== Stop the Church ====
The first "Stop the Church" protest was held on 10 December 1989 by the AIDS Coalition to Unleash Power (ACT UP) and Women's Health and Mobilization. The demonstration took place at St. Patrick's Cathedral in New York while O'Connor was celebrating a Mass attended by Mayor Edward I. Koch and other political leaders. ACTUP opposed the public positions of the Church which they felt were hurtful to people with AIDS, and the Church's anti-abortion views.

Some tried to "storm" the church, but police stopped those who were obvious protesters from entering. The crowd grew to 4,500 gathered outside. Originally, the plan was just to be a "die-in" during the homily but it descended into "pandemonium." A few dozen activists entered the cathedral, interrupted Mass, chanted slogans, blew whistles, "kept up a banchee screech," chained themselves to pews, and laid down in the aisles to stage a "die-in." One protester, "in a gesture large enough for all to see," desecrated the Eucharist by spitting it out of his mouth, crumbling it into pieces, and dropping them to the floor.

One-hundred and eleven protesters were arrested, including 43 inside the church. Some, who refused to move, had to be carried out of the church on stretchers. The protests were widely condemned by public and Church officials, members of the public, the mainstream media, and some in the gay community.

==== 1990 Boston ordination ====
During an ordination of priests in Boston in 1990, ACT UP and the Massachusetts Coalition for Lesbian and Gay Civil Rights chanted and protested outside during the service. The protesters marched, chanted, blew whistles, and sounded airhorns to disrupt the ceremony. They also threw condoms at people as they left the ordination and were forced to stay back behind police and police barricades. One man was arrested. The demonstration was condemned by Leonard P. Zakim, among others.

==== Saint Vincent's Catholic Medical Center ====
In the 1980s, as the gay population of Greenwich Village and New York began succumbing to the AIDS virus, St. Vincent's established the first AIDS Ward on the East Coast and second only to one in San Francisco, and soon became "Ground Zero" for the AIDS-afflicted in NYC. The hospital "became synonymous" with care for AIDS patients in the 1980s, particularly poor gay men and drug users. It became one of the best hospitals in the state for AIDS care with a large research facility and dozens of doctors and nurses working on it.

ACT UP protested the hospital one night in the 1980s due to its Catholic nature. They took over the emergency room and covered crucifixes with condoms. Their intent was both to raise awareness and offend Catholics. Instead of pressing charges, the sisters who ran the hospital decided to meet with the protesters to better understand their concerns.

=== Others in the United States ===
In November 1986, two "mobsters" from the Lavender Hill Mob, a radical gay activist group, dressed as priests and disrupted a Mass at St. Patrick's Cathedral in New York City being said by Cardinal John O'Connor. The disruption came as a protest to the Catholic Church's recent condemnation of homosexuality. They unfurled a banner that said they were gay and would not be silenced. A few weeks later, the group wrote a check for $3,200 so that eight members could attend a charity dinner attended by wealthy New York Catholics, and hosted by the Archbishop of New York. They disrupted the event, unfurled the same banner, and canceled the check before it could be cashed.

In 1989, gay activists in Los Angeles acting under the name of "Greater Religious Responsibility" (GRR) splattered red paint, representing blood, on four churches to protest Archbishop Roger M. Mahony. They also pasted posters of Mahoney calling him a murderer. This was in response to Mahony having chaired a meeting of Catholic bishops to publicly reject the use of condoms as a way to combat the spread of AIDS. Mahony had called 'safe-sex' a "myth, which is both a lie and a fraud." One anonymous priest whose rectory was vandalized told the Los Angeles Times that "This is a horrible struggle for us priests who are trying to be pastoral."

The annual meeting of the bishops of the United States in 2000, including a Mass, was interrupted by a series of protests by gay activists from Soulforce, the Rainbow Sash, and others. The protests came at the end of a year of protests for Soulforce, several of which resulted in arrests, including 104 at the Basilica of the National Shrine of the Immaculate Conception. Seven protesters tried to receive the Eucharist while wearing a bright rainbow-colored sash to indicate they were gay, but were denied it by the administering priest. In the United States, there is a policy "to refuse Communion to anyone who used its reception as an occasion to protest."

=== Outside the US ===
In January 1998, 39-year-old Alfredo Ormando set fire to himself in St Peter's Square, Vatican City, as a political protest against the Catholic Church's condemnation of homosexuality. He died shortly after from his injuries. In Belgium in 2013, four topless women from FEMEN drenched archbishop André-Joseph Léonard with water during a public event to protest the Church's position on homosexuality.

== See also ==
- Fiducia supplicans
- History of the Catholic Church and homosexuality
- Pastoral care for gay Catholics
- Homosexuality and Roman Catholic priests
- Gay bishops
- Political activity of the Catholic Church on LGBT issues
- List of LGBT Catholics

== Sources ==
- Faderman, Lillian (2015). The Gay Revolution. Simon & Schuster. ISBN 9781451694130.
- Jung, Patricia Beattie (2008). Siker, Jeffrey S. (ed.). Homosexuality and Religion. Greenwood Publishing Group. ISBN 978-0313330889.
