= Gerd Dicke =

German Roman Catholic bishop (born 1928)

The Most Reverend Dr. Gerd Dicke
- Auxiliary Bishop Emeritus of Aachen
- Church: Catholic Church
- Diocese: Aachen
- Appointed: 16 February 1970
- Term ended: 21 November 2003
- Other post: Titular Bishop of Iria Flavia (since 1970)

Orders
- Ordination: 25 July 1952
- Consecration: 11 April 1970 by Johannes Pohlschneider

Personal details
- Born: 28 March 1928 (age 98) Erfurt, Weimar Republic
- Denomination: Roman Catholic
- Motto: Domino servientes spe gaudentes
- Coat of arms

Ernst Franz Gerd Werner Dicke (born 28 March 1928) is a German Roman Catholic prelate who served as an auxiliary bishop of the Diocese of Aachen from 1970 until his retirement in 2003. He also held the title of Titular Bishop of Iria Flavia.

== Early life and education ==
Gerd Dicke was born on 28 March 1928 in Erfurt, then part of the Diocese of Fulda in Germany. He completed his secondary education at the Schule zur Himmelspforte in Erfurt and went on to study philosophy and theology in Fulda, Munich, and Aachen.

== Priesthood ==
Dicke was ordained a priest on 25 July 1952 in the Aachen Cathedral by Johannes Joseph van der Velden. After ordination, he served as a parish assistant in Viersen-Rahser and later worked as a religion teacher in Düren and Krefeld. He also completed a doctorate (Dr. phil.) at the University of Cologne in 1959.

== Episcopal ministry ==
On 16 February 1970, Dicke was appointed auxiliary bishop of Diocese of Aachen and titular bishop of Iria Flavia by Pope Paul VI. He received episcopal consecration on 11 April 1970 at Aachen Cathedral, with Bishop Johannes Pohlschneider serving as the principal consecrator.

During his long tenure as auxiliary bishop, Dicke served on numerous diocesan and national bodies, including as chairman of the Caritas Association of Aachen and as bishop vicar for Caritas. He was also active in the German Bishops' Conference’s commissions for education, missions, and social issues.

He served as diocesan administrator of Aachen from 23 January 1994 until 10 February 1995 following the death of Bishop Klaus Hemmerle.

Dicke retired on 21 November 2003 and became auxiliary bishop emeritus of Aachen.

== Legacy and later life ==
After his retirement, Dicke continued to reside in Aachen and remained involved in church and charitable activities. In 2020 he celebrated his 50th episcopal jubilee alongside Heinrich Mussinghoff at Aachen Cathedral, marking half a century since his episcopal consecration.
