= Reger =

Reger is a German surname, derived from the Middle High German reiger, meaning "heron", likely referring to a tall thin person. Alternatively, the name may originally have meant a lively or restless person, from the Middle High German regen, meaning "to be moved or excited". The name may refer to:

- Elsa Reger (1870–1951), German writer, wife of Max Reger
- Erik Reger (1893–1954), German writer
- Fred C. Reger (1916–1994), American politician
- Janet Reger (1935–2005), British businesswoman
- John Reger (1931–2013), American football player
- Max Reger (1873–1916), German composer, pianist, conductor and academic
- Karl Reger (1900–1973), German physicist and author (Karl E. Reger), brother to Martin Reger
- Martin Reger (1909–1980is), German physicist, brother to Karl Reger
