= Johannes Bündgens =

Bishop of Aachen

Johannes Bündgens (born 2 April 1956) was auxiliary bishop of Aachen from 2006 to 2022.

== Biography ==
Born in Eschweiler on 2 April 1956, he applied to become a priest after graduation in school in 1974. After studying theology and philosophy at the Pontifical Gregorian University in Rome, he was ordained a priest on 10 October 1980. From 1981 to 1985 he worked as chaplain at the St. Cornelius parish, Viersen-Dülken. He then worked at the Gregorian University, until he graduated as Doctor of Theology in 1990.

Returning to his home diocese, he then worked in the general vicariate, as well as being an auxiliary priest appointed to support the parishes of Kornelimünster/Walheim and Venwegen. In 1992 he became spiritual advisor at the Collegium Leoninum seminary in Bonn, 1997 also spiritual for the deacons. In 2002 he was appointed priest for several parishes in Heimbach (Eifel), he also worked in the diocese for the beatification of Heinrich Hahn.

On 15 March 2006 he was appointed auxiliary bishop of Aachen and titular bishop of Árd Carna. He received his episcopal consecration on 20 May 2006 from Heinrich Mussinghoff in the Aachen Cathedral.

Pope Francis accepted his resignation on 8 November 2022.

== Coat of arms ==
Coat of arms

The coat of arms of Johannes Bündgens is based on the coat of arms of the diocese of Aachen, a black cross on a golden shield. The inner blue shield displays a golden "love knot" in the middle, symbolizing the love between God and men. It is also an allusion to his family name, which relates to the word bonding. It also looks similar to Celtic ornamentic plaits, which connects the coat of arms to his titular diocese of Árd Carna in Ireland. A golden trefoil leaf above and below the knot also symbolizes the connection with Ireland, as well as his ancestry of farmers. The colors blue and golden were chosen as the colors of his hometown Eschweiler.

The motto of Bishop Bündgens is Mysterium magnum Ecclesia (This is a great mystery: but I speak concerning Christ and the church), taken from Epistle to the Ephesians (5:32).

== See also ==
- Roman Catholic Diocese of Aachen

== Resources ==
- Biography at the Diocese of Aachen (German)
