= Political activity of the Catholic Church on LGBTQ issues =

The political activity of the Catholic Church on LGBTQ issues mainly consists of efforts made by the Catholic Church to support or oppose civil government legislation on issues of importance to LGBTQ people. While the Church has condemned violence against gay and lesbian individuals, it has also, in some countries, opposed efforts to decriminalize homosexuality and resist anti-discrimination measures. The Church advocates for marriage to be legally defined as a union between one man and one woman, thus generally opposing the legalization of same-sex marriages. Opinions on specific LGBTQ issues have been variable and have evolved over time. The Church asserts that certain forms of discrimination against LGBTQ people in some contexts are justifiable in service to the common good.

== Statements on gay rights ==
Church doctrine says that all people are made in the image and likeness of God, giving every human an inherent dignity and that there is nothing which can diminish a person's "inherent and immeasurable worth and dignity" This claim has been cited in defense of the Church's opposition to gay rights. It further states that "every person, irrespective of sexual orientation", has the right to be treated by individuals and by society with dignity, respect, and fairness."

A 1992 letter from Cardinal Joseph Ratzinger condemned gay bashing. It said that LGBTQ people "have the same rights as all persons including the right of not being treated in a manner which offends their personal dignity," and have the right to work, to housing, and others. It adds that:

It is deplorable that homosexual persons have been and are the object of violent malice in speech or in action. Such treatment deserves condemnation from the Church's pastors wherever it occurs. It reveals a kind of disregard for others which endangers the most fundamental principles of a healthy society. The intrinsic dignity of each person must always be respected in word, in action and in law.

But at the same time Ratzinger suggested that anti-gay violence could be partly the fault of LGBTQ people if they push too hard to seek equal rights.

When civil legislation is introduced to protect behavior to which no one has any conceivable right, neither the church nor society at large should be surprised when other distorted notions and practices gain ground and irrational and violent reactions increase.

The Church also teaches that rights to public housing, employment in certain industries, or other areas are not absolute and that gay people can, and sometimes should, be prevented from accessing these services or careers to "protect the common good" and that acting in this way does not constitute unjust discrimination. The Church teaches that sexual orientation is different from qualities such as race, ethnicity, sex, or age in that it is usually not known unless disclosed.

In 2014, the United Nations' Committee on the Rights of the Child expressed concern in a report about the Holy See's past statements and declarations on homosexuality which it said "contribute to the social stigmatization of and violence against lesbian, gay, bisexual, and transgender adolescents and children raised by same sex couples." The Committee urged the Holy See to "make full use of its moral authority to condemn all forms of harassment, discrimination or violence against children based on their sexual orientation or the sexual orientation of their parents and to support efforts at international level for the decriminalisation of homosexuality."

== Decriminalization of homosexuality ==
=== National level ===
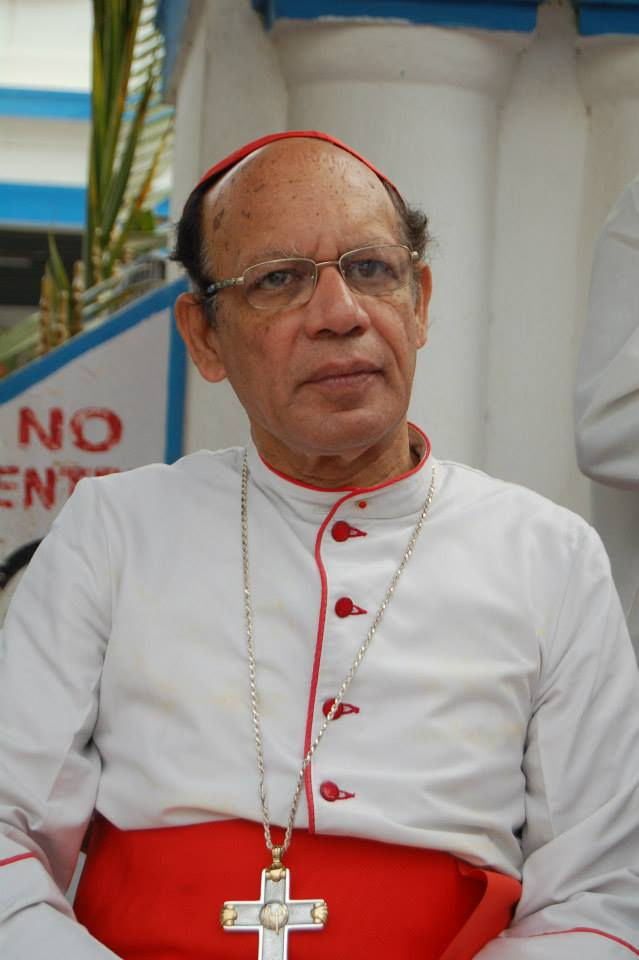
Cardinal Oswald Gracias condemned "all forms of unjust discrimination, harassment or abuse" against LGBTQ people.

In various countries, members of the Catholic Church have intervened on occasions both to support efforts to decriminalize homosexuality, and also to ensure it remains an offence under criminal law.

In the 1960s, Catholic opinion was mixed with regard to the Wolfenden report's recommendation of decriminalizing homosexual acts in England and Wales. A committee convened by the Church endorsed decriminalization, while the opinion of the Church and the hierarchy was somewhat more conservative, notably in comparison with the Church of England, which was more sympathetic to reform. In Australia, Cardinal Archbishop Norman Thomas Gilroy supported efforts begun in the 1970s to likewise change the law. In the United States the Catholic National Federation of Priests' Councils declared their opposition to "all civil laws which make consensual homosexual acts between adults a crime."

In New Zealand in the 1980s, although the Church declined to submit a formal response to the parliamentary enquiry on decriminalization, Cardinal Williams did issue a statement opposing homosexual law reform. In the 1970s and 1980s in Belize, and India, the local churches opposed the decriminalization of homosexual acts. These positions were against those of the Vatican. However, in later years, Cardinal Oswald Gracias, the archbishop of Mumbai, spoke out against India's anti-sodomy law. Gracias, President of the Catholic Bishops' Conference of India, declared it wrong to make gay people criminals, since the Catholic Church "teaches that homosexuals have the same dignity of every human being and condemns all forms of unjust discrimination, harassment or abuse."

Days after a law was signed criminalizing homosexual acts in Nigeria, an editorial in "The Southern Cross" (a newspaper run jointly by the bishops of South Africa, Botswana and Swaziland) criticised the law, calling on the Catholic Church in Africa to stand with the powerless and "sound the alarm at the advance throughout Africa of draconian legislation aimed at criminalizing homosexuals." It noted the "deep-seated sense of homophobia" in Africa and said the Catholic church had too often been "silent, in some cases even quietly complicit" in the face of the new anti-gay measures. At least one bishop argued that the Catholic Church would "defend any person with a homosexual orientation who is being harassed, who is being imprisoned, who is being punished." Reports suggested that the influence of Pope Francis may have led to him modify his former position.

In Uganda, some bishops joined other religious leaders in calling on parliamentarians to make progress in enacting an anti-homosexuality bill. In 2015, Bishop Giuseppe Franzelli in the Diocese of Lira, denied that the Catholic Church in Uganda is institutionally behind any push towards anti-gay legislation, and called for "respect and love" for gay people. Rather he blamed fundamentalist US Christian groups as well as "individual Catholics, including some bishops," for encouraging greater criminal sanctions. The Papal Nuncio to Uganda, Archbishop Michael Blume, voiced concern and shock at the bill. In Kenya, Bishop Alfred Rotich welcomed a ruling from the High Court in May 2019 which upheld the laws against gay sex.

=== At the United Nations ===
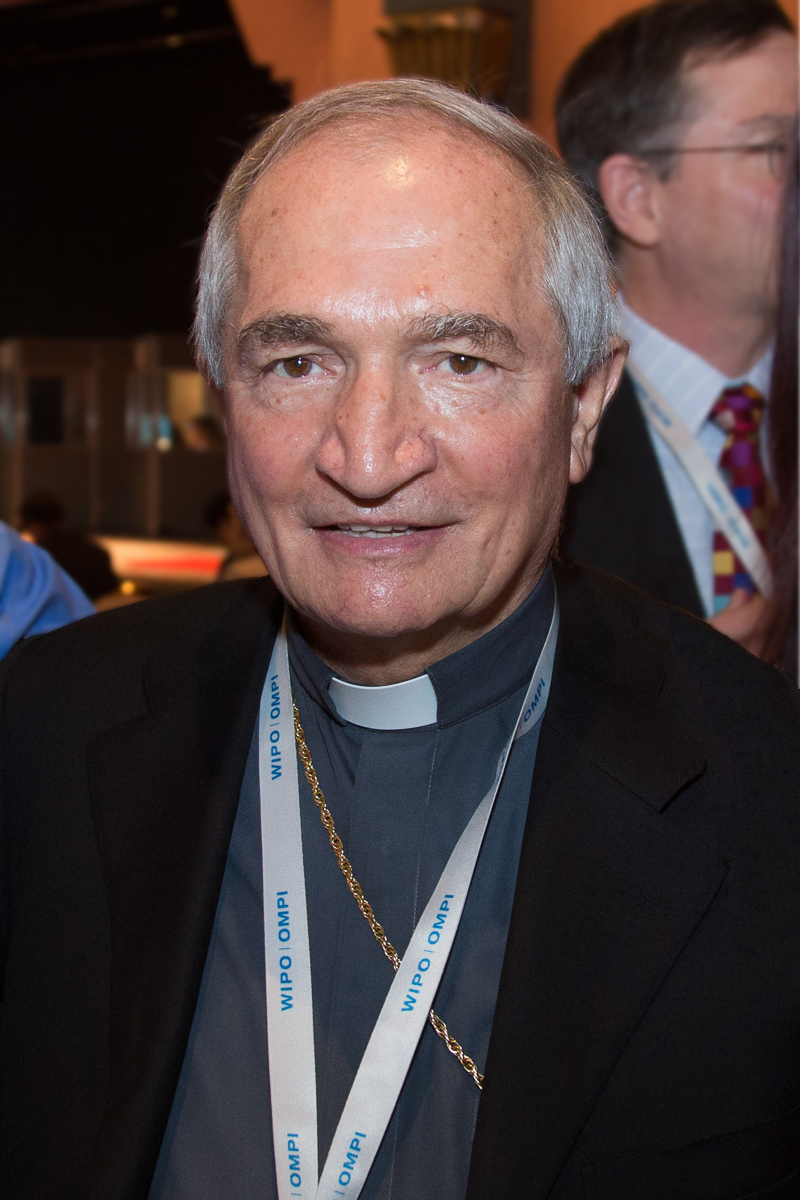
Archbishop Tomasi expressed concern that a UN resolution marked the start of a move to "insert gay rights in the global human rights agenda."

In 2008, the Holy See, as an observer at the United Nations, called for an end to unjust discrimination and criminal penalties directed against homosexuals. They have opposed, however, a U.N. resolution against violence, discrimination, and criminalization of LGBTQ people, saying that the wording of the resolution "goes well beyond the above-mentioned and shared intent" of eliminating discrimination and would pressure countries into legalizing gay marriage.

Speaking on the floor of the General Assembly, Archbishop Celestino Migliore, the Holy See's representative at the United Nations General Assembly, said: "The Holy See appreciates the attempts made [in the draft declaration] to condemn all forms of violence against homosexual persons as well as urges States to take necessary measures to put an end to all criminal penalties against them," but added that its failure to define the terms "sexual orientation" and "gender identity" would produce "serious uncertainty" and "undermine the ability of States to enter into and enforce new and existing human rights conventions and standards." He added in an interview that the proposed declaration would put pressure on countries to enact gay marriage and allow gay couples to adopt children.

At the 16th session of the UN Human Rights Council in 2011, during discussion of a Joint Statement on Ending Violence and Related Human Rights Violations Based on Sexual Orientation and Gender Identity, the Holy See's representative, Archbishop Silvano Maria Tomasi, stated: "A state should never punish a person, or deprive a person of the enjoyment of any human right, based just on the person's feelings and thoughts, including sexual thoughts and feelings. But states can, and must, regulate behaviors, including various sexual behaviors. Throughout the world, there is a consensus between societies that certain kinds of sexual behaviors must be forbidden by law. Pedophilia and incest are two examples." He later said of that resolution that recognizing gay rights would cause discrimination against religious leaders and that there was concern lest consequent legislation would lead to "natural marriages and families" being "socially downgraded."

On 28 January 2012, the UN Secretary General, Ban Ki-moon, gave a speech calling on African nations to repeal laws that place sanctions on homosexual conduct. Speaking to a journalist, African Cardinal Robert Sarah, president of the Pontifical Council Cor Unum, called the speech stupid. He added: 'Poor countries like Africa just accept it because it's imposed upon them through money, through being tied to aid.'" He said that African bishops must react against this move against African culture. Meanwhile, Cardinal Peter Turkson, while recognising that some of the sanctions imposed on homosexuals in Africa are an "exaggeration," stated that the "intensity of the reaction is probably commensurate with tradition." "Just as there's a sense of a call for rights, there's also a call to respect culture, of all kinds of people," he said. "So, if it's being stigmatized, in fairness, it's probably right to find out why it is being stigmatized." He also called for distinction to be made between human rights and moral issues.

== Discrimination laws ==
At a 2009 United Nations event, the Church spoke out against all forms of violence and unjust discrimination directed towards LGBTQ people, and opposed "all violent or discriminatory penal legislation" that undermines the inherent dignity of the human person.

=== Australia ===
In 2018, the Australian Catholic Bishops Conference joined the Anglican Diocese of Sydney to publicly call for a religious freedom act to protect religious exemptions to discrimination laws. They said that their teaching "makes it clear that a gay person should be assessed for employment on the same basis as anyone else" and that "staff in a school could reasonably be expected to support the teachings of the particular religion, to not undermine that teaching and to act as role models to their students."

=== Italy ===
in 2021, the Catholic church was an opponent of the Zan bill. The bill would have banned discrimination and incitement to violence against LGBTQ people. The church argued that the bill contradicted the Lateran treaty. The bill passed the lower house of the Italian parliament but it failed in the senate.

=== Poland ===
In 1997, Catholic bishops in Poland were successful in opposing the introduction of provisions into the country's constitution that would bar discrimination on grounds of sexual orientation. In 2010, the European Union criticized schools and colleges owned by the Catholic Church in Poland for refusing to employ staff that were openly gay. In January 2013, the Catholic Church in Poland publicly thanked members of parliament for voting down a bill that would have allowed same-sex civil partnerships. Archbishop Marek Jędraszewski has called "gender ideology" an "extremely dangerous ideology that leads directly to the death of our civilization". During a sermon on August 1, 2019, Jędraszewski called "LGBT ideology" a "rainbow plague" and compared it to the "Red Plague" of Communism.

=== United States ===
In 1975, the National Conference of Catholic Bishops taught that LGBTQ people "should not suffer prejudice against their basic human rights. They have the right to respect, friendship and justice." The following year, Richmond Bishop Walter Sullivan wrote in the Richmond News Leader that "The issue before our community and the [human rights] commission, however, is not the morality of a person's sexual orientation, but rather a person's rights and protection under the law. We believe that a person's sexual orientation, whether it is one we approve or disapprove, is not a proper ground for depriving that person of the basic rights and protections that belong to all human beings."

In 1983, the bishops of the State of Washington stated that "There are those who think that gays and lesbians inevitably impart a homosexual value system to children or that they molest children. This is a prejudice and must be unmasked as such. There is no evidence that exposure to homosexuals, of itself, harms a child.... Accordingly, there is no need to make efforts to screen out all homosexually oriented persons from our educational system."

In 1992, voters in the State of Oregon were asked to vote on a Constitutional amendment that declared homosexuality, pedophilia, sadism or masochism to be "abnormal, wrong, unnatural and perverse and they are to be discouraged and avoided." The first two religious leaders to oppose the measure were Bishops William Levada and Thomas Connolly. Connolly said the measure was not "fair, just, or appropriate" and that it "could produce very bad results." He said that the state should not "condemn [people] for who they are, and it's wrong to deny them basic human rights." Levada said the amendment was "potentially harmful and discriminatory to homosexual citizens" and prohibited petitions for the amendment to be circulated on church property.

Following regular meetings with members of DignityUSA, Cardinal John O'Connor of New York agreed to support an anti-hate crime bill protecting LGBTQ people in 1997. Also in that year, in Always our Children, the US bishops taught that "the fundamental human rights of homosexual persons must be defended and that all of us must strive to eliminate any form of injustice, oppression, or violence against them."

In 2013, the United States Conference of Bishops opposed a bill that would prohibit discrimination in hiring and employment on the basis of sexual orientation or gender identity by civilian, nonreligious employers with at least 15 employees. While they expressed their belief that "no one should be an object of scorn, hatred, or violence for any reason, including sexual inclination," the bishops declared: "We have a moral obligation to oppose any law that would be so likely to contribute to legal attempts to redefine marriage."

The U.S. Conference of Catholic Bishops intervened in 2017 in the Masterpiece Cakeshop v. Colorado Civil Rights Commission. It filed a friend-of-the-court brief in support of the baker who had refused to make a wedding cake for a gay couple. It was joined by other Catholic organisations including the Colorado Catholic Conference, Catholic Bar Association, Catholic Medical Association, National Association of Catholic Nurses-USA and National Catholic Bioethics Centre. The Supreme Court ruled in favor of the baker.

Courts have upheld the dismissal of church employees for entering into same sex marriages. DignityUSA reports that more than 100 employees of Catholic institutions across the US have lost their posts from 2014 to 2017 for being gay or for marrying a same-sex spouse.

== Same-sex marriage and civil unions ==
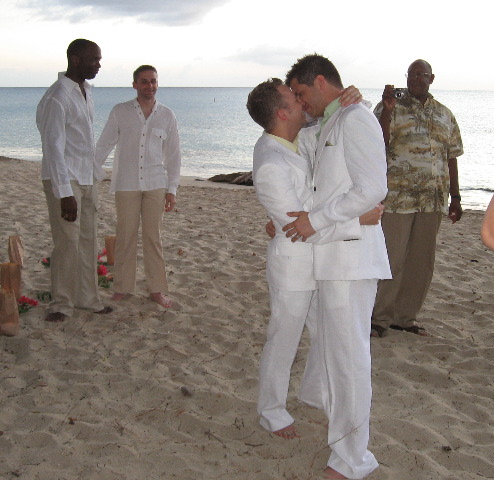
A same-sex wedding ceremony

The Catholic Church has intervened in national political discourses to enact legislative and constitutional provisions establishing marriage as the union of a man and a woman, in line with the Church's teaching on marriage. In the United States, the leadership of the Catholic Church has taken an active and financial role in political campaigns across all states regarding same-sex marriage. In July 2003, the hierarchy of the Catholic Church in Canada, the country's plurality religion, protested the Chrétien government's plans to include same-sex couples in civil marriage.

In Spain and Portugal, Catholic leaders led the opposition to same-sex marriage, urging their followers to vote against it. The Irish Bishops Conference stated in their submission to a constitutional convention that, if the civil definition of marriage was changed to include same-sex marriage, so that it differed from the church's own definition, they could no longer perform civil functions at weddings.

Church leaders have also opposed the introduction of gay marriage in Australia, the United Kingdom, Uruguay, Cameroon, Italy, Croatia, the Philippines, and Nigeria.

Cardinal Timothy Dolan, the chairman of the US bishops' Committee for Religious Liberty, opposed the Respect for Marriage Act.

In April 2025, the German Roman-Catholic bishops' conference published a manual for blessing ceremonies for same-sex unions.

== Transgender issues ==
Responding to a document published by the United States Department of Education regarding transgender students, the bishops of the United States said that "children, youth, and parents in these difficult situations deserve compassion, sensitivity, and respect." However, they criticized the document for "infringing on legitimate concerns about privacy and security on the part of the other young students and parents" when allowing transgender students to use facilities designated for the gender with which they identify. The bishops said the government did "not even attempt to achieve this balance" and pointed to the words of Pope Francis: "the young need to be helped to accept their own body as it was created."

The bishops of England and Wales had concerns about a proposed 2017 law that would affect transgender youths in schools, and wanted to "ensure that there is no bullying of any sort." The Catholic Parliamentary Office in Scotland opposed allowing children as young as 16 to legally change their gender.

== Diplomatic disagreements ==
In January 2015, the French government announced that it was proposing Laurent Stefanini as its ambassador to the Holy See. Stefanini was chief of protocol for President François Hollande and had served as France's Head of Mission to the Vatican from 2001 to 2005. Cardinal André Vingt-Trois, Archbishop of Paris, sent a letter to Pope Francis in support of Stefanini, a practicing Roman Catholic who is reported to be gay, but has not spoken publicly of his sexuality, nor entered into a legal same-sex relationship. He publicly supported the legalization of same-sex marriage in France in 2013. The Pope met with Stefanini for forty minutes on 17 April. By October the Vatican had neither accepted nor rejected the appointment, and press speculation blamed either Stefanini's sexual orientation, France's recent legalization of same-sex marriage, or Vatican displeasure with the fact that the nomination was leaked for political reasons. France named Stefanini its ambassador to UNESCO in April 2016.

== See also ==
- History of the Catholic Church and homosexuality
- Pastoral care for gay Catholics
- Dissent from Catholic teaching on homosexuality
- Homosexuality and Roman Catholic priests
- Gay bishops
- List of LGBTQ Catholics
- Alfredo Ormando
- Christianity and transgender people

== Works cited ==
- Peddicord, Richard (1996). Gay and Lesbian Rights: A Question--sexual Ethics Or Social Justice?. Rowman & Littlefield. ISBN 978-1-55612-759-5.
- Alston, Philip; Goodman, Ryan (2013). International Human Rights. OUP Oxford. ISBN 978-0-19-957872-6.
- Siker, Jeffrey S. (2007). Homosexuality and Religion: An Encyclopedia. Greenwood Publishing Group. ISBN 978-0-313-33088-9.
