= Ursulakapelle, Gressenich =

Chapel

Coordinates: 50°46′20″N 6°18′19″E

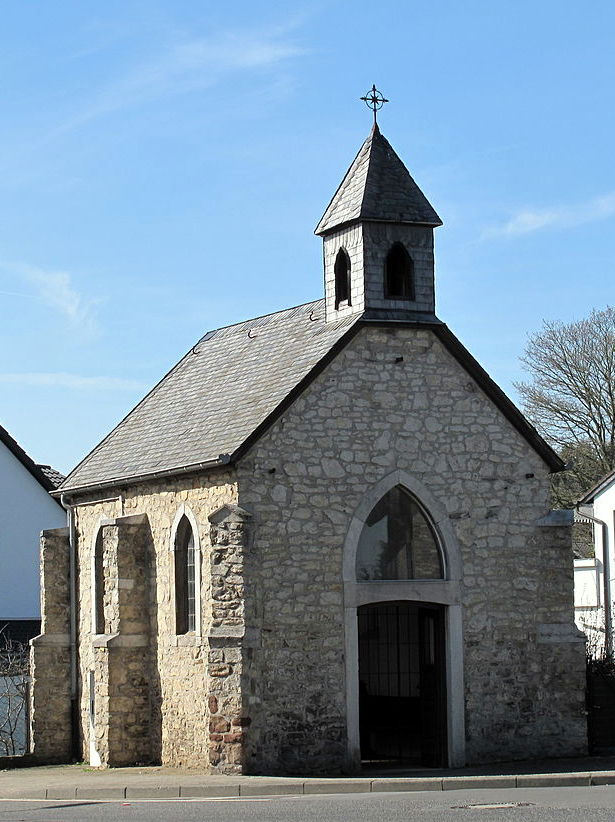
The chapel in Gressenich

The Ursulakapelle (St. Ursula's Chapel) is a catholic house of prayer in the German village of Gressenich, part of Stolberg, within the Diocese of Aachen.

== History ==
The chapel was built in the 18th century to thank God for his support during severe flooding by the rivulet Omerbach. During the Second World War the chapel, made of crushed stone, was severely damaged. It took the inhabitants of Gressenich many years to rebuild it. The chapel was dedicated on Corpus Christi 1954,

== Architecture ==
The chapel was built in Gothic style. Its dimensions are 7 by 3.70 meters. A characteristic feature is a three-sided apse in western direction. It can be reached through a door with a Gothic skylight.

== See also ==
- Catholic Church in Germany
