= Crepedula =

Africa Proconsularis (125 AD)

Crepedula was an ancient Roman–Berber civitas in the province of Byzacena in Africa Proconsularis. It was located in modern Tunisia. The town was also the seat of a Catholic diocese.

There are three known bishops of this diocese.

- The Catholic bishop Barbarianus Creperulensis attended the Council of Carthage (411), he had no Donatists competitors.
- Felix was among the Catholic bishops summoned to Carthage in 484 by the Vandal king Huneric.
- Finally, among the signatories of a letter against monothelitism dated 646 was Speranza.

Today Crepedula survives as titular bishopric and the current bishop is Karl Borsch, of Aachen.
