= Leonard P. Zakim =

American religious and civil rights leader

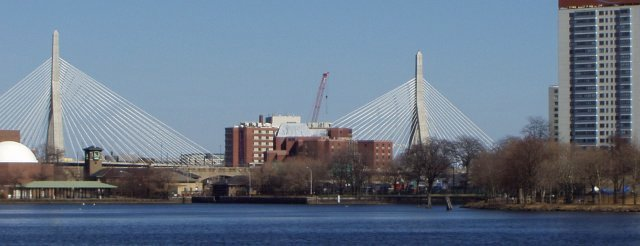
The Leonard P. Zakim Bunker Hill Memorial Bridge over the Charles River was named to honor Zakim's civil rights and race relations work in Boston.

Leonard Paul Zakim (November 17, 1953 – December 2, 1999) was a Jewish American religious and civil rights leader in Boston. Zakim died in 1999 after a five-year battle with bone-marrow cancer. Boston's Leonard P. Zakim Bunker Hill Bridge was named in his honor.

== Early life and education ==
Zakim, nicknamed "Lenny", was born in Clifton, New Jersey and became interested in civil rights and activism after he encountered anti-semitism as a boy. He earned his B.A. degree from American University in Washington, DC and his J.D. degree from the New England School of Law in 1978. He settled in the Boston area after law school and lived there until the end of his life. In 1978, he worked as the southeast Massachusetts field director for the reelection campaign of then Massachusetts Governor Michael Dukakis. Paid $50 a week to work on the ultimately unsuccessful campaign, this experience nevertheless formed the cornerstone of his later political involvement. "The campaign was the beginning of an association with Dukakis and his wife, Kitty, that would bring Zakim to the policy-making level of the national Democratic Party, a standing he retained after Dukakis's political career faded," the Boston Globe wrote in its obituary on Zakim.

In 1979, he was hired by the Anti-Defamation League (ADL) as its New England Civil Rights director and in 1984 he was named New England director for the organization. He and his wife Joyce had three children: Josh, Deena and Shari.

== Civil rights advocacy ==
Zakim was also co-founder of A World of Difference Institute, an anti-bias educational project formed in Boston in 1986. The project has been adapted in 29 other cities and six counties.

Zakim and Rev. Charles Stith founded an annual Black-Jewish Seder in Boston which inspired many interfaith Seders with Catholic, Protestant and Jewish participants in Boston and nationally. At the time of his death it was the largest Black-Jewish seder in the USA. He also "used his political connections and friendships with black ministers, Roman Catholic leaders and sports celebrities to establish community organizations and public-service events, including the 12,000-member Team Harmony antiracism rally for teenagers", the New York Times said in its obituary.

During the last years of his life, as he struggled with myeloma, he founded the Lenny Zakim Fund to fight poverty and racism in Boston. Shortly before his death, he organized a Catholic-Jewish pilgrimage to Rome with his friend Cardinal Bernard Law. There, he had an audience with Pope John Paul II, prompting the New Jersey native to say: "I've had my picture taken with the Pope, Bruce Springsteen and the Dalai Lama. Now I've got to get the three of them together." He condemned the protest by gay rights and abortion rights activists outside the Cathedral of the Holy Cross in Boston that disrupted an ordination of priests in 1990.

== Publications ==
Zakim published several articles about the Middle East, Black-Jewish and Catholic-Jewish relations, anti-Semitism, violence and hate crimes. He wrote a Brandeis University publication about coalition building and Lift Up Your Voice, a book about race and religious relations released in 1998. He co-authored, with Janice Ditchek, Confronting Anti-Semitism: A Practical Guide.

== Political relationships ==
Zakim served as a member of the Massachusetts Democratic State Committee. In addition to working on the gubernatorial and presidential election campaigns of Dukakis, he was a close advisor and good friend of Steven Grossman when Grossman was chairman of the Massachusetts Democratic Party and later the National Democratic Party.

His work in Boston revolved around his personal relationships. "I am a firm believer that relationships count more than institutions", he said. "It's because you know someone that you start to care about their issues." In particular, his relationship with Cardinal Law was crucial. The men were friendly before Law became Cardinal. (Zakim traveled with the delegation to Rome when Law was elevated from archbishop). Upon returning to Boston in 1985, Law delivered his first sermon as cardinal on anti-semitism and the two men traveled to Poland together in 1986, where they visited the Auschwitz concentration camp and spoke to Catholic groups about anti-semitism.

== Honors ==
For bringing together Catholics and Jews in Boston, he was honored with a Knighthood of St. Gregory from Pope John Paul II during his November, 1999 trip to Rome. Zakim also received the Urban League's Community Service Award and the Catholic Charities Medal. He also received an honorary degree in humane letters from Brandeis University and numerous other awards for leadership in human rights.

The Leonard P. Zakim Bunker Hill Bridge, the Charles River crossing of Interstate 93 and US 1 completed in 2003 as part of the Big Dig (the Central Artery/Tunnel Project), was named in his honor.

The World Wide Web Consortium's Zakim IRC bot is named "in honor both of human rights advocate Lenny Zakim who gave voice to the people and the Zakim bridge across the Charles."
