= Alfredo Ormando =

Italian writer and gay rights activist (1958–1998)

- Born: 15 December 1958; San Cataldo, Sicily, Italy
- Died: 23 January 1998 (aged 39); Sant'Eugenio Hospital, Rome, Lazio, Italy
- Cause of death: Burns from self-immolation
- Occupation: Writer

Alfredo Ormando (15 December 1958 – 23 January 1998) was a gay writer from Palermo who died as a result of setting himself on fire outside Saint Peter's Basilica. His self-immolation was an act of protest against the Roman Catholic Church's teaching on homosexuality.

Ormando's only published book was the novel Il Fratacchione ("The Overweight Monk"), which recounted his two years at a monastery attempting to get closer to God and to purify himself of unclean desires. The narrator in the book states, "It isn't true that gay is beautiful. On the contrary, it is a continual death on the inside. Either you accept being gay, or you kill yourself."

On 13 January 1998, Ormando set himself on fire in St. Peter's Square close to where Pope John Paul II was addressing the crowds. Two policemen tried to extinguish the flames, and he was taken to Sant'Eugenio Hospital with third-degree burns over 90 percent of his body. He died 10 days later. Ormando was 39 years old. In a letter to a friend he wrote: "I hope they will understand the message I want to give - it is a form of protest against a Church that demonises homosexuality, demonising nature at the same time; despite the fact that homosexuality is a child of nature".

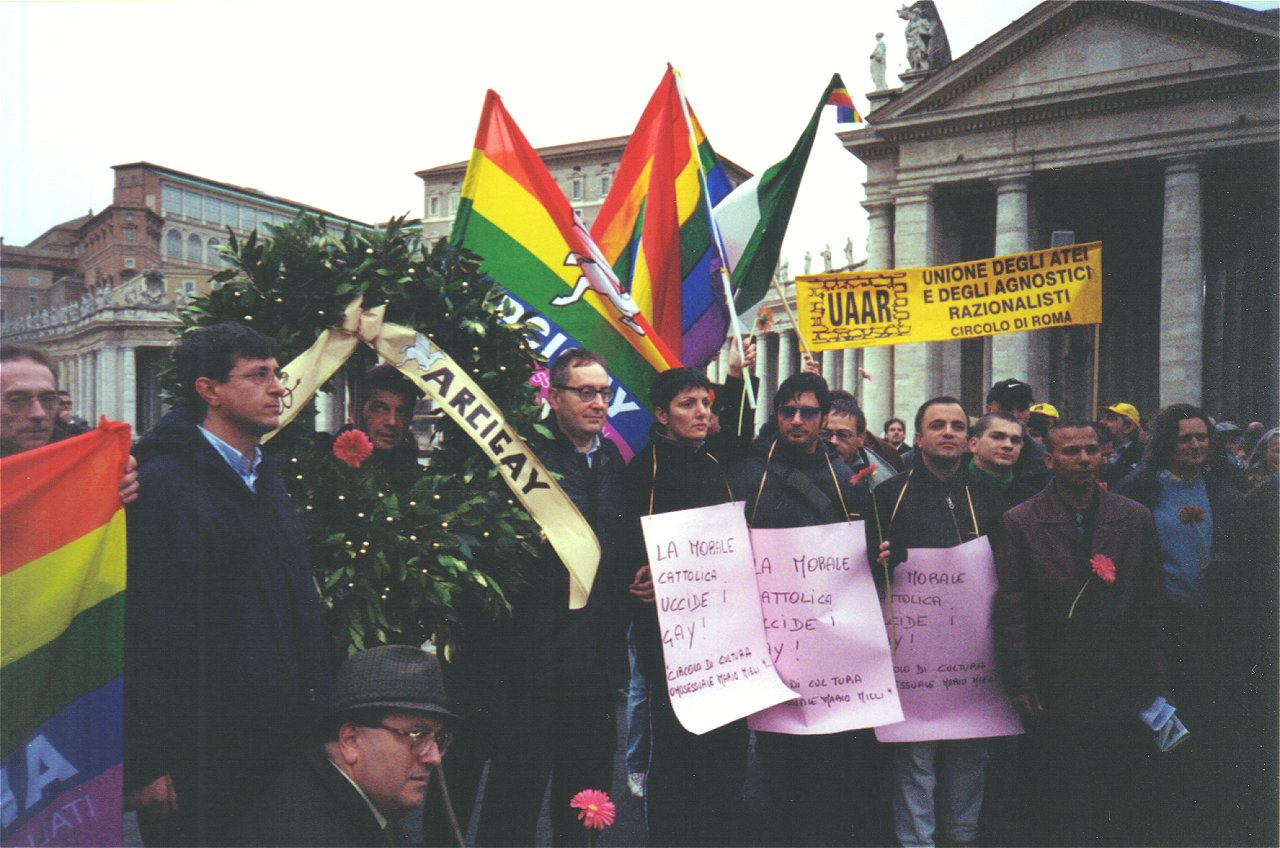
Sit-in in memory of Alfredo Ormando, 2001

As of 2015, Ormando's actions are commemorated annually in St Peter's Square by LGBTQ rights activists.

In 2014, the filmmaker Andy Abrahams Wilson, produced a 40-minute documentary film called Alfredo's Fire for the San Francisco-based Open Eye Pictures. Wilson argued that, "Fire was the perfect allegory for the experiences of LGBTQ people. Fire is at once a self-annihilation, and harkens back to the Middle Ages when homosexuals were burned at the stake". He said that church authorities downplayed the event, arguing that Ormando was psychologically disturbed, had family problems and had not been making a protest against the Church.

== See also ==
- Catholic Church and homosexuality
- Dissent from Catholic teaching on homosexuality
- List of political self-immolations
