= Karl Reger =

German Roman Catholic prelate (1930–2024)

- Auxiliary Bishop Emeritus of Aachen
- Appointed: 23 December 1986
- Term ended: 15 March 2006
- Other post: Titular Bishop of Árd Sratha (1986–2024)

Orders
- Ordination: 25 July 1960
- Consecration: 7 February 1987 by Klaus Hemmerle

Personal details
- Born: 7 September 1930 Giescheid, Germany
- Died: 27 March 2024 (aged 93) Schleiden, Germany
- Motto: Deus Caritas est
- Coat of arms

Styles of Karl Reger
- Reference style: His Excellency; The Most Reverend
- Spoken style: Your Excellency
- Religious style: Bishop

Karl Reger (7 September 1930 – 27 March 2024) was a German Roman Catholic prelate. He served as the auxiliary bishop of the Roman Catholic Diocese of Aachen from 1986 to 2006. He died in Schleiden on 27 March 2024, at the age of 93.

Catholic Church titles
Preceded by —	Auxiliary Bishop of Aachen; 1986–2006	Succeeded by —
Preceded by Joseph Wang Yu-jung	Titular Bishop of Árd Sratha; 1986–2024	Succeeded by Vacant
