= Helmut Dieser =

German Roman Catholic bishop

Helmut Karl Dieser
- Bishop of Aachen
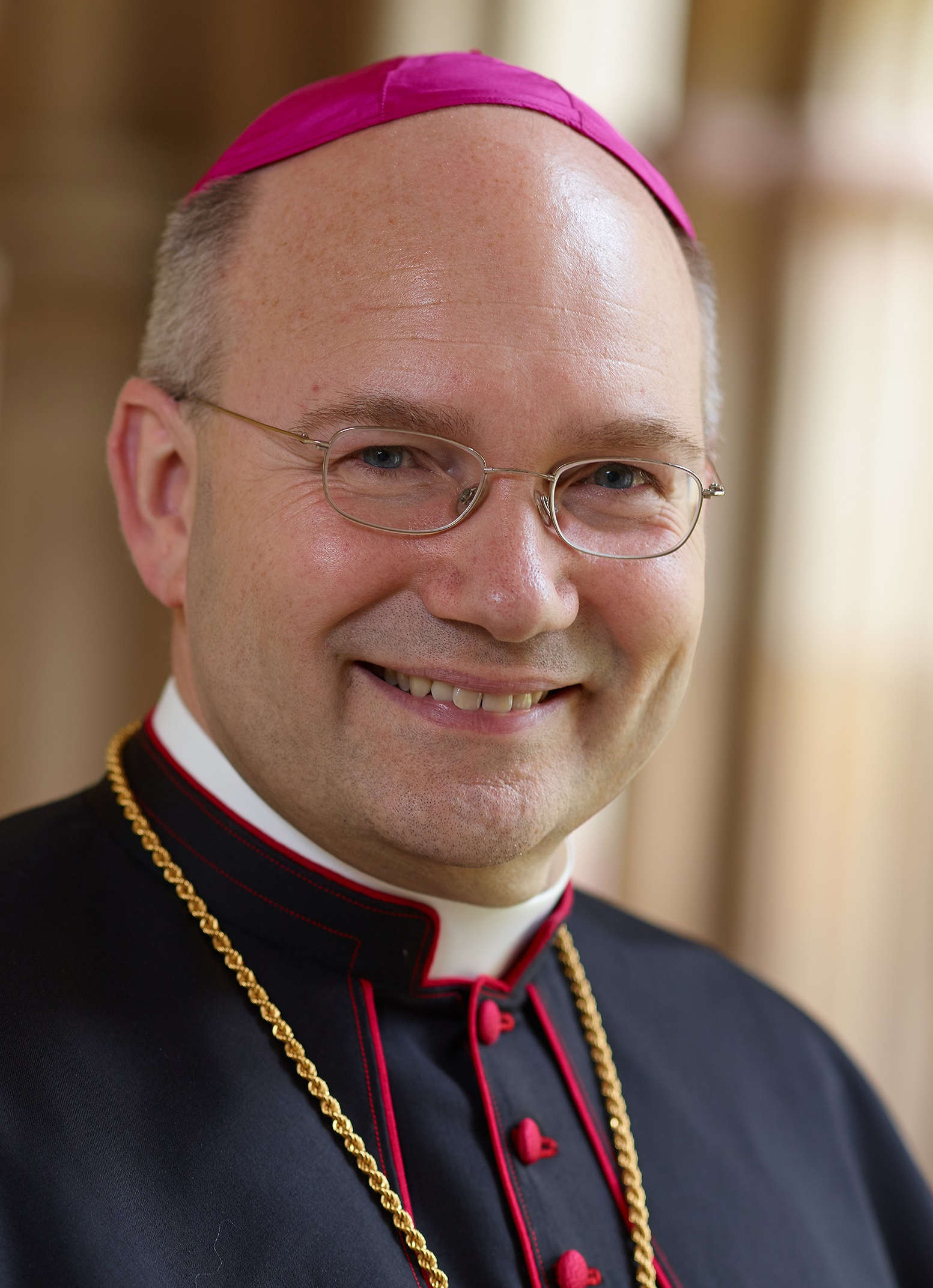
- Helmut Dieser in 2016
- Church: Catholic Church
- Diocese: Diocese of Aachen
- Appointed: 23 September 2016
- Predecessor: Heinrich Mussinghoff
- Previous posts: Titular Bishop of Narona (2011-2016); Auxiliary Bishop of Trier (2011-2016)

Orders
- Ordination: 8 July 1989 by Hermann Josef Spital
- Consecration: 5 June 2011 by Stephan Ackermann

Personal details
- Born: 15 May 1962 (age 64) Neuwied, Rhineland-Palatinate, West Germany
- Motto: Pax Dei Omnem Sensum Exsuperat
- Coat of arms

Helmut Dieser (born March 15, 1962, in Neuwied) is a German Roman Catholic bishop of the Roman Catholic Diocese of Aachen.

== Life ==
Dieser studied Roman Catholic theology and philosophy in Trier and Tübingen. On 8 July 1989 Dieser became priest. On 5 June 2011 Dieser became ordained titular bishop of Narona. Since 12 November 2016 Dieser is bishop of Aachen.

== Positions ==
In March 2019, Dieser said, exceptions from clerical celibacy in the Catholic Church should be allowed. In his opinion, there should be a reform of the Catholic sexual morality and sexual acts between homosexual partnerships no longer a sin in Roman Catholic catechism. In June 2020, Dieser said blessing of same-sex partnerships should be allowed in the Roman catholic church.
