= Augustus Peters =

German clergyman and bishop

Augustus Peters (born 27 May 1931 in Aachen) was a German clergyman and bishop for the Roman Catholic Diocese of Aachen. He became ordained in 1958. He was appointed bishop in 1981. He died in 1986.
