= Sant'Eugenio Hospital =

Hospital in Rome, Italy

Coordinates: 41.8220°N 12.4717°E

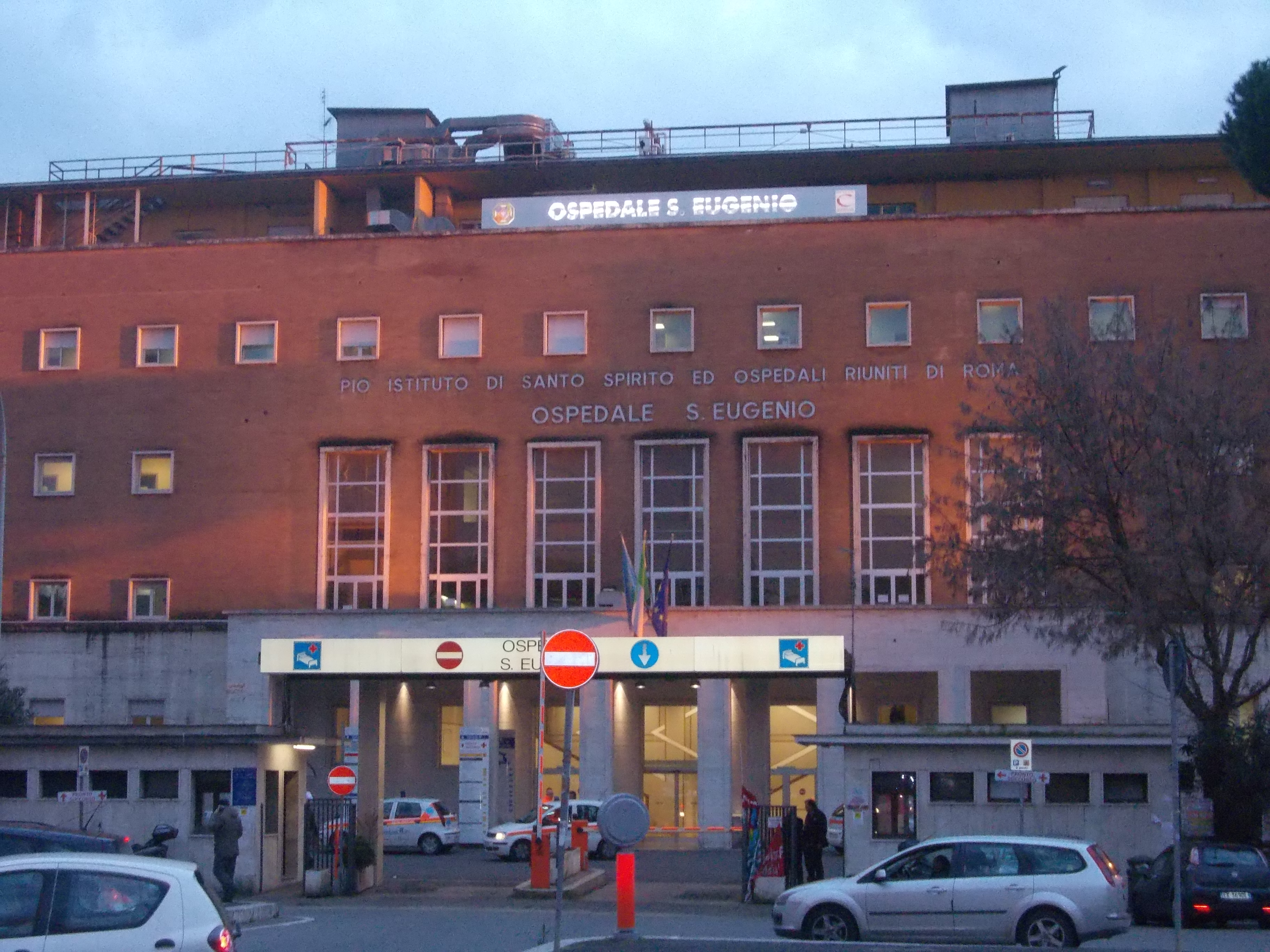
The main entrance

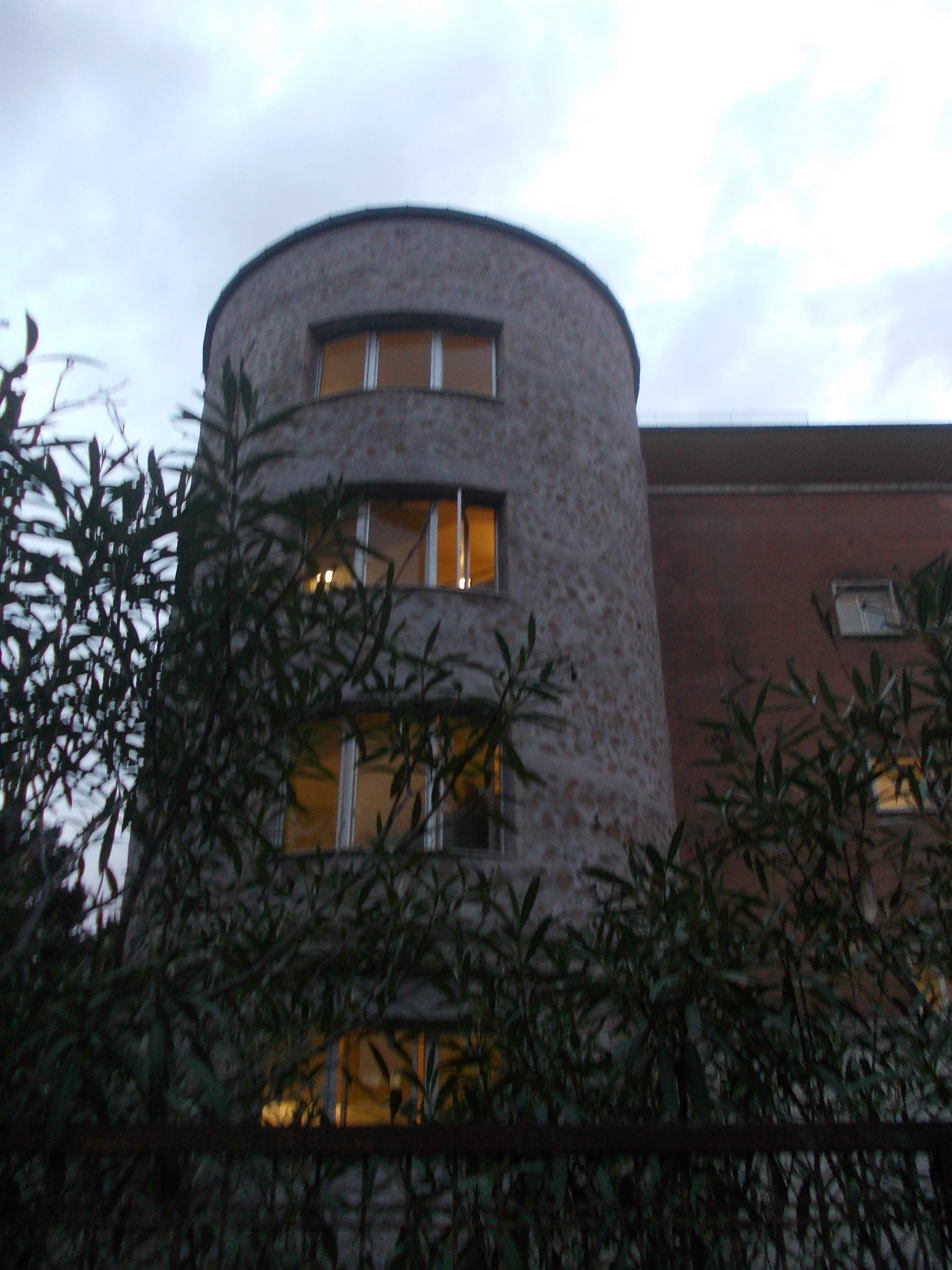
One of the four corner towers of the five planned in the original project.

Sant'Eugenio Hospital (Italian: ospedale Sant'Eugenio) is a hospital located in Rome. It is one of the largest hospitals in Central Italy. The construction of the hospital began in 1933, during the Fascist period. The original project, curated by Gaspare Lenzi, Luigi Lenzi and Dagoberto Ortensi, was inspired by Castel del Monte but planned to develop the building of an octagonal plant (rather than pentagonal) and erecting five towers at the corners of the rationalist building. The intention would be to occupy the institute of eugenics, with some scholars involved in the project having been among the signatories of the Manifesto of Race.

== History ==
Commissioned by Nicola Pende in 1934, construction of the historic hospital building began in 1938, when during the Fascist period there were plans to equip Italy with a “Central Institute for Human Reclamation, Orthogenesis and Naturist Therapy,” to be inaugurated for the Esposizione Universale di Roma scheduled for 1942.

The original project, designed by Gaspare Lenzi, Luigi Lenzi and Dagoberto Ortensi, was inspired by Castel del Monte but planned the building on a pentagonal rather than octagonal layout; it was ultimately decided to construct four towers at the corners of the Rationalist building, symbolizing—within the concept of “human reclamation”—the child, the woman, the worker, and the race. The institute was intended to deal with eugenics, following the involvement of several scholars associated with the project and signatories of the Manifesto of Race, after an academic and scientific debate over the direction of state racism; between 1939 and 1941 Pende’s ideas were formalized.

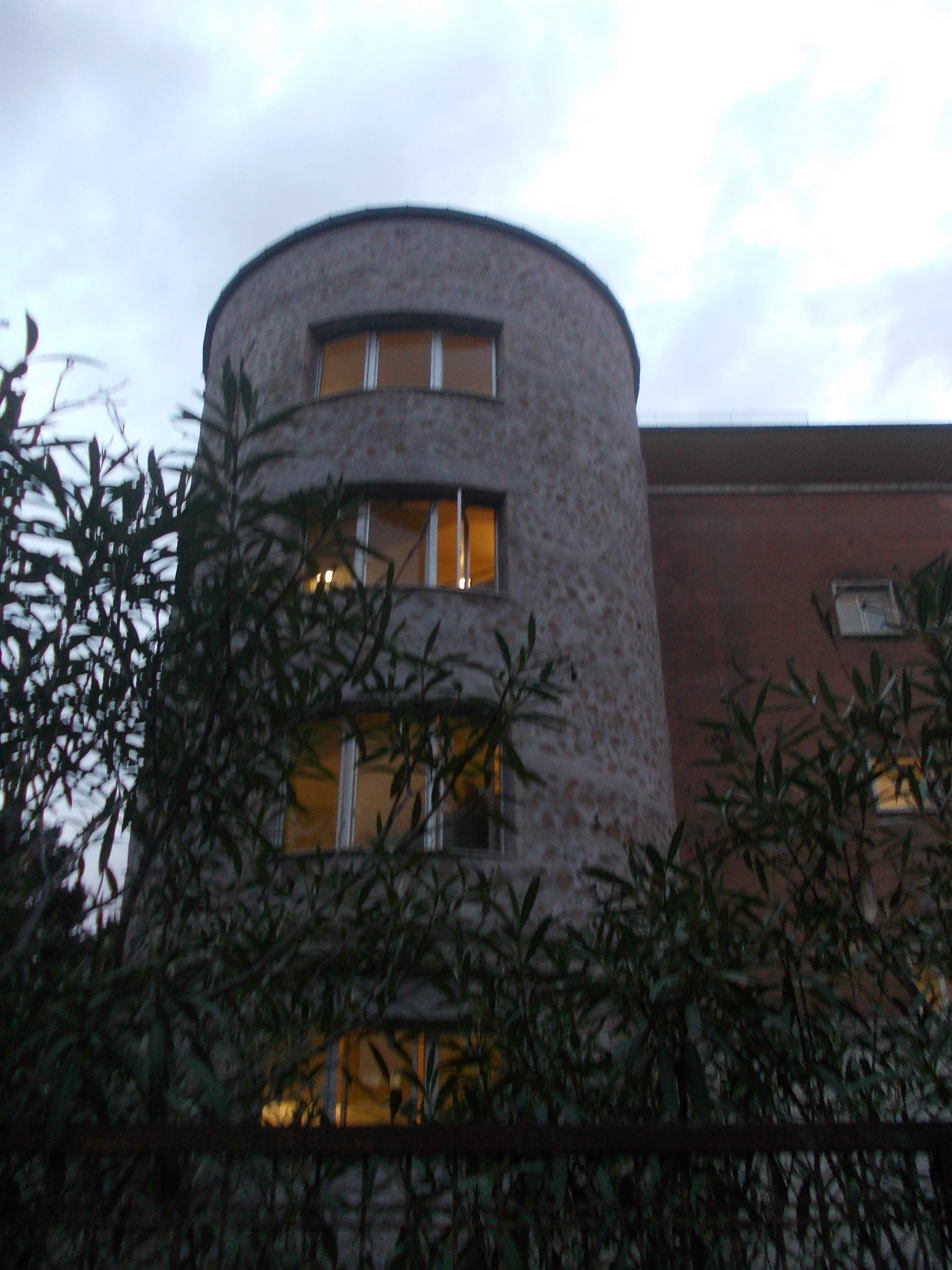
One of the four corner towers, out of the five originally planned in the project.

The outbreak of war prevented the Universal Exposition from taking place, and construction of the institute was halted; during the liberation of Rome in 1944, the building was occupied by United States troops.

It was later used as headquarters for the administration for international aid under a 99-year lease; however, due to the administration’s inability to bear the high costs required to complete the structure, ownership of the building was transferred to the Pio Istituto Santo Spirito and United Hospitals of Rome, an institution that since 1896 had aimed to coordinate and develop Rome’s hospital facilities. In 1957, thanks to the work of several doctors from Policlinico Umberto I, the hospital was opened to the public and inaugurated on 9 June of that year. In 1961, a burn treatment center was established at Sant’Eugenio Hospital, which for a long time remained the only specialized facility for severe burns in central and southern Italy.

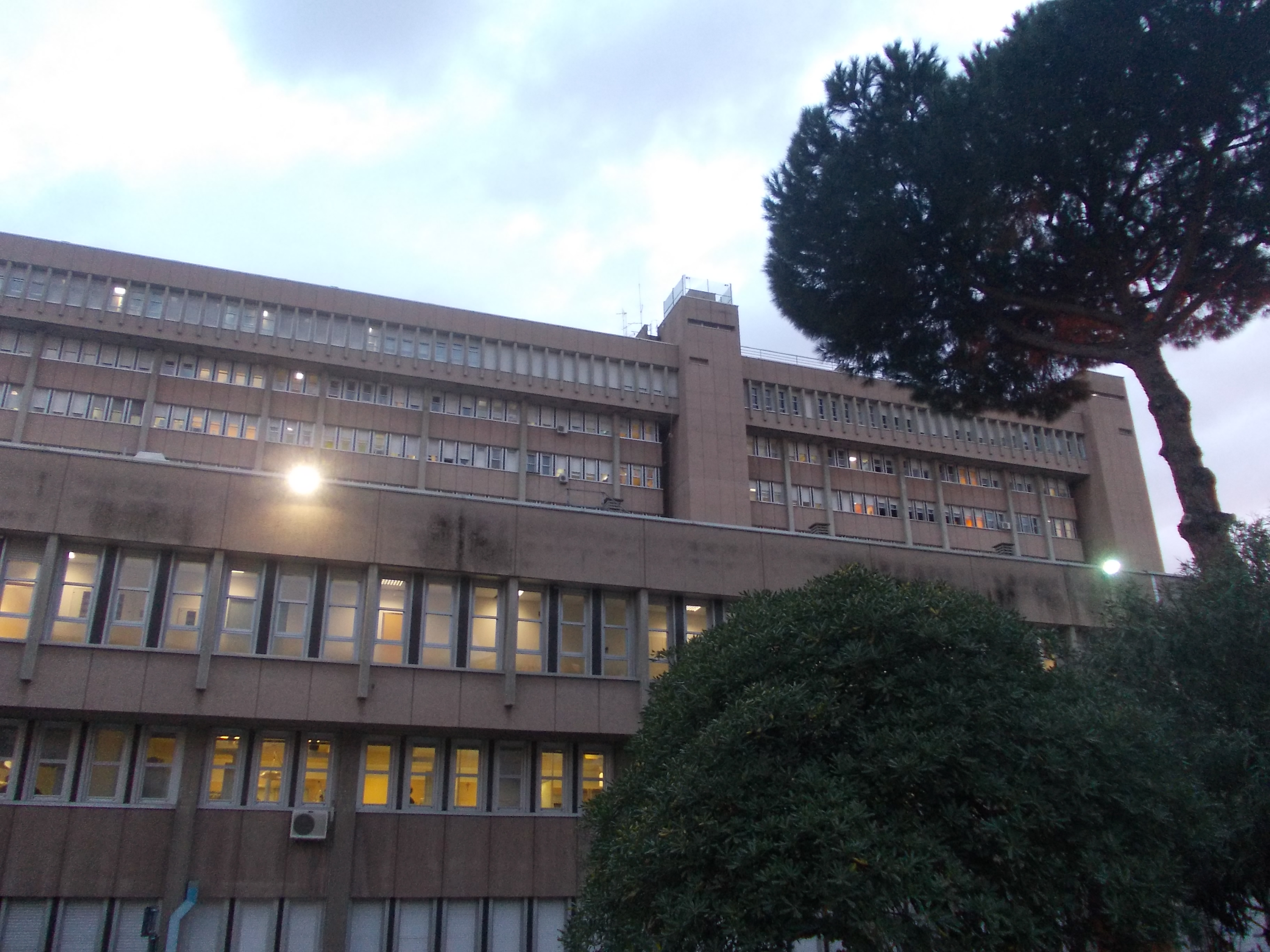
The new building of Sant’Eugenio Hospital.

In 1978, based on a 1965 design by architect Gualtiero Gualtieri, expansion works began and were completed in 1986 with the activation of inpatient wards located in the new and large building constructed behind the pre-war structure, which nevertheless continues to be used.

== Organization ==
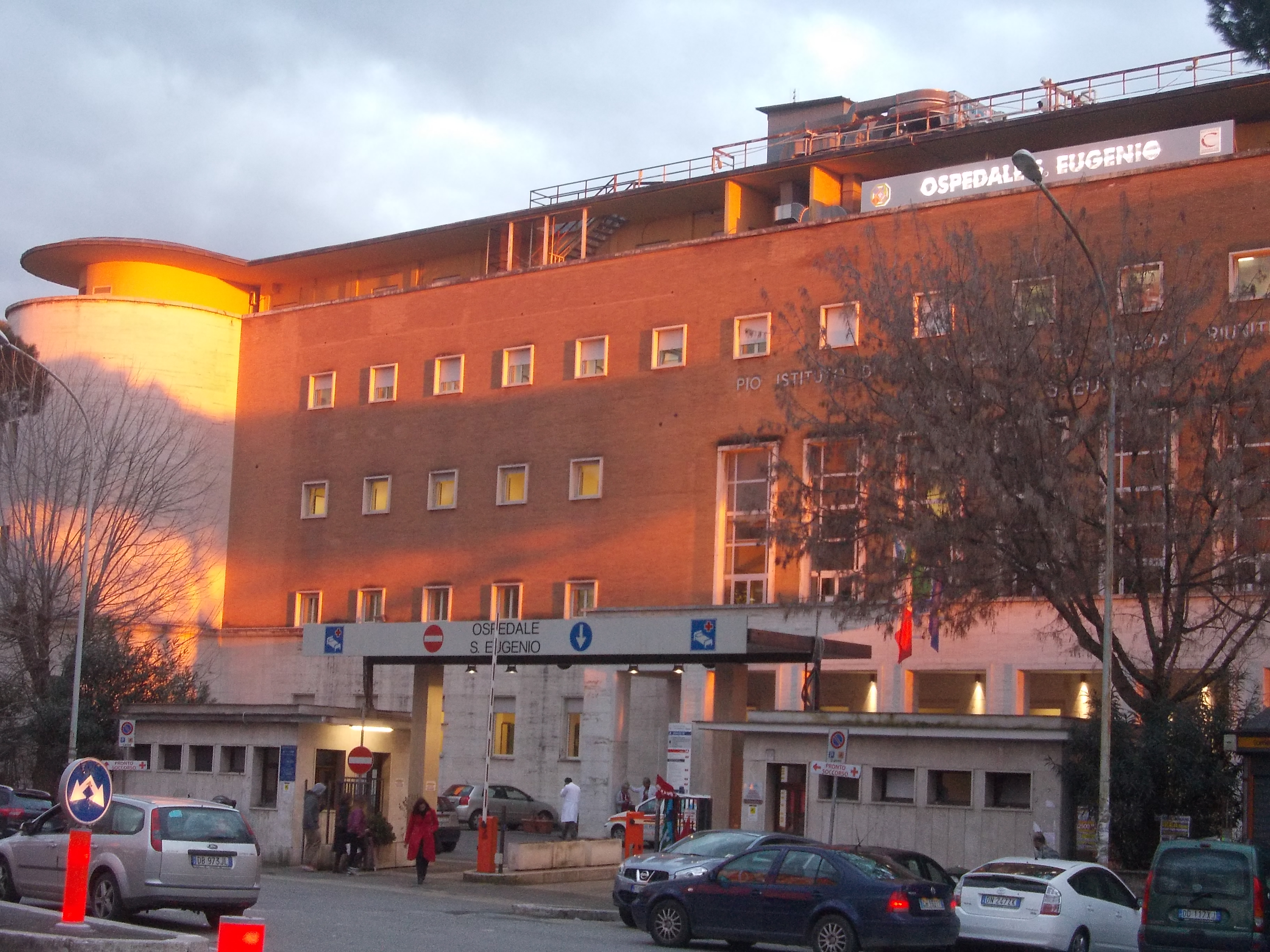
View of the main entrance and the older section of Sant’Eugenio Hospital.

The hospital’s activities are organized into the following departments:

1. Department of Services
  - Pathological anatomy and histology
  - Private practice services (ALPI)
  - Placental blood bank
  - Nuclear medicine
  - Clinical pathology
  - Radiology
2. Department of Specialties
  - Major burns center and plastic surgery
  - Hematology
  - Endocrinology and diabetology service
  - Oncological surgery
  - Thalassemia day hospital
  - Nephrology and dialysis
3. Department of Surgery
  - Outpatient phlebology services
  - Proctological surgery
  - Transplant surgery
  - General surgery
  - Vascular surgery
  - Ophthalmology
  - Otorhinolaryngology
  - Urology
  - Multidisciplinary day surgery
  - Surgery, Santa Caterina della Rosa unit
4. Department of Medicine
  - Cardiology
  - Internal medicine II
  - Neurology and Stroke Unit
  - Medical oncology
  - Gastroenterology and digestive endoscopy service
  - Medical angiologia
  - Cardiology day hospital
  - Clinical nutrition
5. Emergency Department
  - Emergency surgery
  - Emergency medicine
  - Orthopedics and traumatology
  - Anesthesia and intensive care
6. Maternal and Child Department
  - Obstetrics and gynecology
  - Family planning
  - Pediatrics
7. Geriatrics service
8. Laparoscopic surgery and advanced surgical technologies

== In popular culture ==
The hospital appears in several scenes of the 1981 film Pierino medico della SAUB, starring Alvaro Vitali.
