= Alfredo's Fire =

Documentary film

- Directed by: Andy Abrahams Wilson
- Narrated by: Andrea Pallaoro
- Music by: Justin Melland
- Distributed by: Open Eye Pictures
- Release date: February 2, 2014 (Santa Barbara International Film Festival)
- Running time: 40 minutes
- Country: United States
- Language: English

Alfredo's Fire is a 2014 documentary film, directed by Andy Abrahams Wilson, about self-immolation victim Alfredo Ormando, who set fire to himself in January 1998 outside St. Peter's Basilica to protest the Catholic Church's condemnation of homosexuality. The film had its world premiere on February 2, 2014, at the Santa Barbara International Film Festival.
