= Ekkart Sauser =

Austrian priest and historian (1933–2019)

Ekkart Sauser (14 April 1933 in Innsbruck – 20 November 2019 in Trier) was an Austrian Roman Catholic priest, theologian, and church historian. Ordained as a Jesuit in Innsbruck, he wrote numerous articles for the Biographisch-Bibliographisches Kirchenlexikon, was a member of the Cartellverband and lectured at the University of Innsbruck. He also received a Prelate of Honour of His Holiness for the title Monsignor. His icon collection is at Kremsmünster Abbey.
