= Castel del Monte =

Castel del Monte may refer to:

- Castel del Monte, Abruzzo, a comune and town in the province of L'Aquila, Italy
- Castel del Monte, Apulia, a 13th-century castle and World Heritage Site in southern Italy
- Castel del Monte, a wine Denominazione di origine controllata of the Italian province of Barletta-Andria-Trani in Apulia
