= Karl Borsch =

Bishop of Aachen

Coat of arms of Karl Borsch

Karl Borsch (born August 1, 1959 in Krefeld-Hüls) is auxiliary bishop of Aachen.

Born in Krefeld, he grew up in Kempen, where he also attended the gymnasium Thomaeum, where he graduated with abitur. From 1979-1985 he studied law in Bonn. From 1985-1990 he studied theology at the Philosophisch-Theologische Hochschule Sankt Georgen (Frankfurt) and in Freiburg.

On September 26, 1992 he was ordained a priest in Aachen, and worked as a chaplain in Hückelhoven until September 1996. From October 1, 1996 until March 31, 2002 he worked as the chaplain of the bishop and secretary. From October 2002 until March 2004 he was also director of the Collegium Leoninum seminary in Bonn.

On November 21, 2003 he was appointed auxiliary bishop of Aachen and titular bishop of Crepedula. He was consecrated on January 17, 2004 by Heinrich Mussinghoff in the Aachen Cathedral.

== Coat of arms ==
The coat of arms of Karl Borsch is based on the coat of arms of the diocese of Aachen, a black cross on a golden shield. The inner red shield displays at top a deer antler, the symbol of Saint Hubertus, who is the patron saint of the home parish of Bishop Borsch in Kempen. Below is the cross of Saint Anthony the Great, whose feast day is on January 17, the day of the consecration of bishop Borsch.

The motto of Bishop Borsch is Quaerite primum regnum Dei (But seek first the kingdom of God), taken from Gospel of Matthew (6:33).

== See also ==
- Bishop of Aachen

== Resources ==
- Biography at the Diocese of Aachen (German)
