= Johannes Joseph van der Velden =

Coat of arms of Johannes Joseph van der Velden

Johannes Joseph van der Velden (7 August 1891 – 19 May 1954) was a German Roman Catholic theologian and prelate, who served as Bishop of Aachen.

He presided over the Diocese of Aachen from 7 September 1943 until his death. In 1944, he advised the Allied authorities on the selection of Franz Oppenhoff, who was subsequently installed as Mayor of Aachen.
