= Diocese of Aachen =

Catholic diocese in Germany

Diocese of Aachen Dioecesis Aquisgranensis Bistum Aachen

Catholic
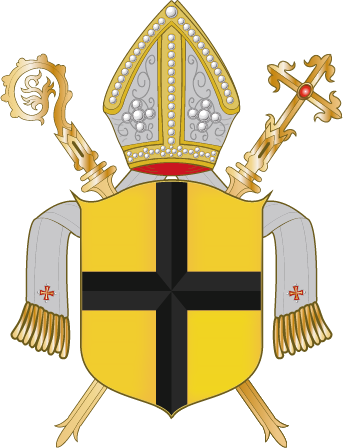
- Coat of arms

Location
- Country: Germany
- Metropolitan: Archdiocese of Cologne

Statistics
- Area: 3,937 km^{2} (1,520 sq mi)
- Population: Total; Catholics: (as of 2012); 2,028,699; 1,110,948 (54.8%)
- Parishes: 538

Information
- Denomination: Roman Catholic
- Rite: Roman Rite
- Established: 1802 (re-established 13 August 1930)
- Cathedral: Aachen Cathedral
- Patron saint: Mary, Mother of Jesus
- Secular priests: 535

Current leadership
- Pope: Leo XIV
- Bishop: Helmut Dieser
- Metropolitan Archbishop: Rainer Maria Woelki
- Auxiliary Bishops: Karl Borsch
- Vicar General: Andreas Frick
- Bishops emeritus: Gerd Dicke; Heinrich Mussinghoff; Johannes Bündgens

Map
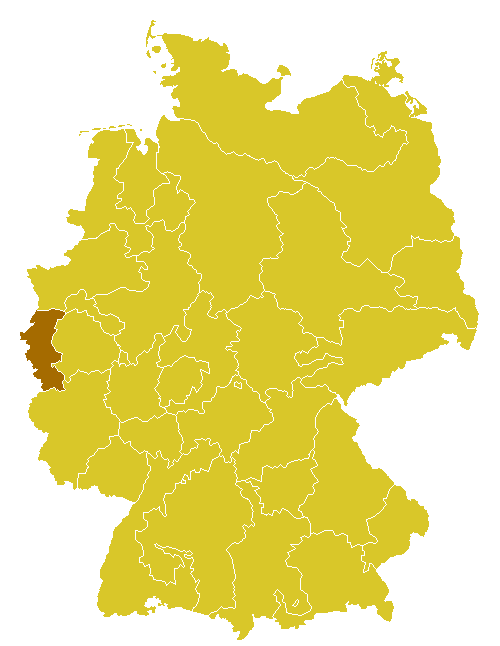
- Location of the Diocese of Aachen

The Diocese of Aachen (Latin: Dioecesis Aquisgranensis) is a Latin diocese of the Catholic Church located in Germany and one of the six dioceses in the ecclesiastical province of Cologne. The incumbent bishop is Helmut Dieser, who was appointed by Pope Francis on 23 September 2016. The bishop's seat is Aachen.

== Geography ==
The diocese is located in the very west of Germany, extending from Krefeld in the north to the mountainous Eifel area in the south. Bordering dioceses are Cologne, Münster, Essen and Trier in Germany, Liège in Belgium and Roermond in the Netherlands.

The diocese is divided into seven regions which are in turn further subdivided into 538 parishesː

1. Region Aachen-Stadt (Aachen city)
2. Region Düren
3. Region Eifel
4. Region Heinsberg
5. Region Kempen Viersen
6. Region Krefeld
7. Region Mönchengladbach

== Ordinaries ==
The bishop emeritus of Aachen is Heinrich Mussinghoff. There are two auxiliary bishops, Johannes Bündgens and Karl Borsch. Also, there are two emeritus auxiliary bishops, Gerd Dicke and Karl Reger. The vicar general is Andreas Frick.

=== List of diocesan bishops ===
Tenure	Incumbent	Notes
9 May 1802 – 13 August 1809	Marc Antoine Berdolet	Installed 25 July 1802; died in office
1821	Diocese abolished	
1930	Diocese re-established	
30 January 1931 – 5 October 1937	Joseph Vogt	Ordained 19 March 1931; installed 25 March 1931; died in office
7 September 1943 – 19 May 1954	Johannes Joseph van der Velden	Priest of Köln (Cologne); ordained 10 October 1943; died in office
30 August 1954 – 13 December 1974	Johannes Pohlschneider	Priest of Münster; ordained 18 November 1954; retired
9 September 1975 – 23 January 1994	Klaus Hemmerle	Priest of Freiburg im Breisgau; ordained 8 November 1975; died in office
12 December 1994 – 8 December 2015	Heinrich Mussinghoff	Priest of Münster; ordained 11 February 1995

=== List of auxiliary bishops ===
Tenure	Incumbent	Notes
1931–1943	Hermann Joseph Sträter	Ordained 16 October 1931, became Apostolic Administrator 15 May 1938, died 16 March 1943
1938–1969	Friedrich Hünermann	Ordained 3 December 1938, died 15 February 1969
1961–1979	Joseph Ludwig Buchkremer	Ordained 21 December 1961, retired 4 October 1979
1970–2003	Ernst Franz Gerd Werner Dicke	Ordained 11 April 1970, retired 21 November 2003
1978–1980	Maximilian Goffart	Ordained 18 February 1978, died 17 July 1980
1981–1986	Augustus Peters	Ordained 6 April 1981, died 3 May 1986
1987–2006	Karl Reger	Ordained 7 February 1987, retired 15 March 2006
2003–present	Karl Borsch	Ordained 17 January 2004
2006–present	Johannes Bündgens	Ordained 20 May 2006, retired 8 November 2022

== History ==
Historically, today's territory of the Diocese of Aachen belonged to the Diocese of Liège and the Archdiocese of Cologne. The diocese was first created in 1802, covering the area west of the Rhine formerly belonging to Cologne, as well as parts from the dioceses Liège, Utrecht, Roermond and Mainz. After the first bishop Marc Antoine Berdolet died in 1809, Pope Pius VII refused to commission the successor suggested by Napoleon, Jean Denis François Camus. After the French rulership over the area, the diocese was abolished by the bull De salute animarum of July 16, 1821, and incorporated into the archdiocese of Cologne.

On August 13, 1930 the diocese was re-established by the papal bull Pastorale officii nostri. Joseph Vogt was appointed as its first bishop.

== Major Churches ==
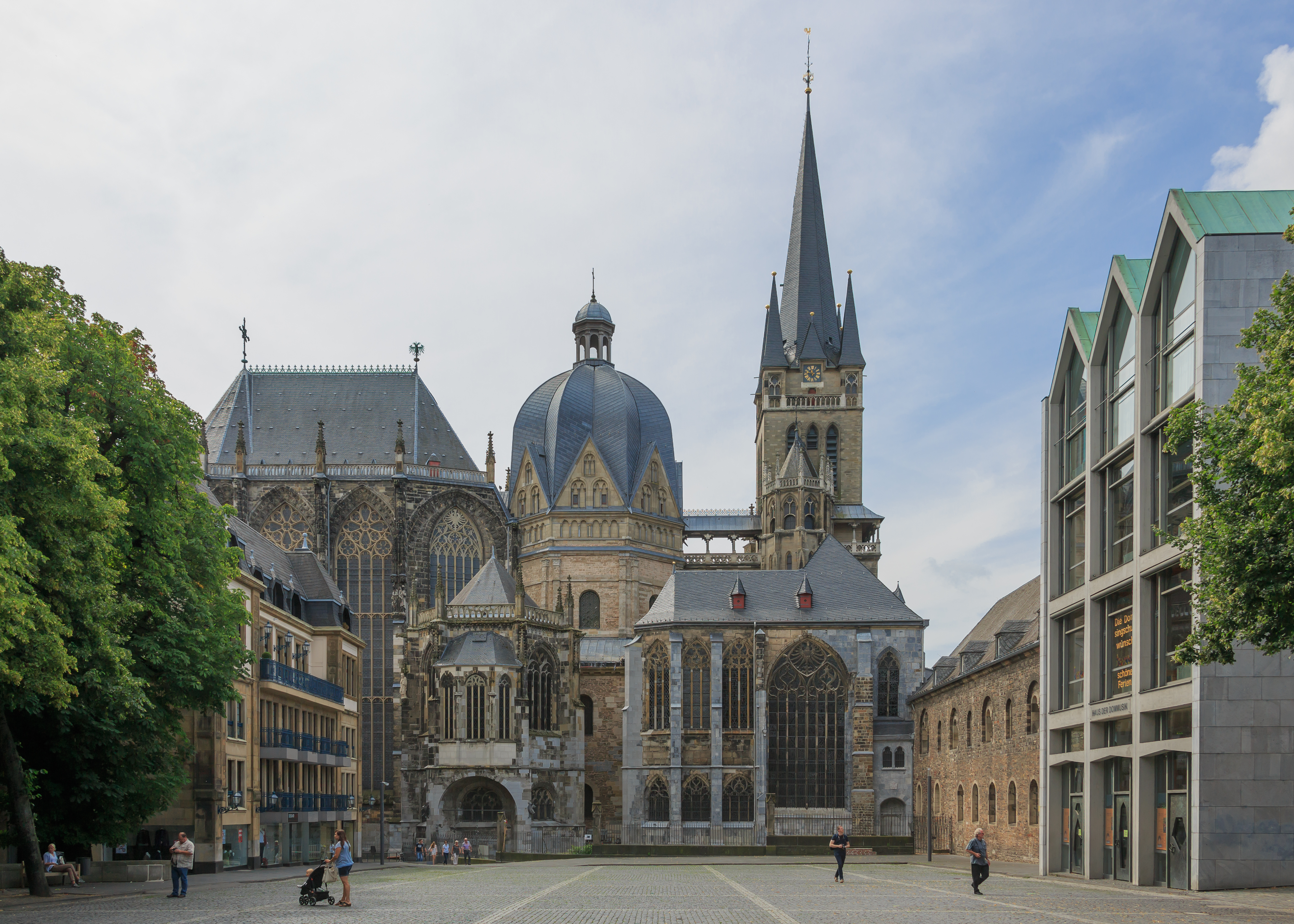
Aachen Cathedral

The principal church of the diocese is the Aachen Cathedral, of which the central part, the Palatine Chapel, was built in 800 under Charlemagne. It was also the first German World Heritage Site, inscribed in 1978.

The diocese has two churches that have been given the status of basilica minorː

- Steinfeld Basilica, Kall-Steinfeld – 7 October 1960
- Minster St. Vitus, Mönchengladbach – 25 April 1973

== See also ==
- Catholic Church in Germany
- List of Roman Catholic dioceses in Germany
- Ursulakapelle, at Gressenich, part of Stolberg town
