= Gareth Moore (theologian) =

OP Gareth Moore
- Born: Gareth Edward Moore; 6 July 1948; Bermondsey, London, England
- Died: 6 December 2002 (aged 54); Oxford, England
- Education: Corpus Christi College, Oxford

Gareth Edward Moore OP (6 July 1948 – 6 December 2002) was an English theologian, author and Dominican friar.

== Early life and education ==
Moore was the son of George Edward Moore, a stevedore, and his second wife Alice (nee Langley). He was born in Bermondsey and lived with his parents and his older half-brother, son of Alice in a previous marriage, in Rotherhithe. He attended Raine's Foundation Grammar School. Gareth was a successful student and taught himself Russian through independent study. He was the first pupil from the school to get a scholarship to Corpus Christi College, Oxford, where he graduated with a B.Litt degree, with his dissertation on the later writings of Ludwig Wittgenstein.

== Career ==
He briefly joined the monastery at Quarr Abbey on the Isle of Wight but left to visit Zambia and teach mathematics. In 1977, Moore joined the Dominicans as a novice.

In 1995, Moore was elected prior of the Couvent de l’Epiphanie in Rixensart, Belgium. In 2001, he returned to England and to Blackfriars, Oxford. He was soon diagnosed with kidney cancer and died in 2002.

Moore wrote a number of books an articles on religion including Believing in God (1988) and a number of works on human sexuality including The Body in Context: Sex and Catholicism (1992). In The Body in Context, Moore challenges theological arguments presented on a number of topics in sexual ethics including those forbidding the use of contraception and condemning homosexuality. The latter topic was expanded in Moore's book A Question of Truth: Christianity and Homosexuality.

Moore returned to University of Oxford as a scholar in 2001, but was soon diagnosed with kidney cancer. He died on 6 December 2002, at the age of 54.

== Bibliography ==
=== Books ===
- Believing in God: A Philosophical Essay. Edinburgh: T. & T. Clark. 1988.
- The Body in Context: Sex and Catholicism (1992)
- A Question of Truth: Christianity and Homosexuality (2003)

=== Critical studies and reviews of Moore's work ===
Believing in God

- Hinton, Timothy (January 2021). "The Integrity of Gareth Moore's Believing in God". New Blackfriars. 102 (1097): 6–21. doi:10.1111/nbfr.12582.
- Robinson, Howard (January 2021). "Reply to Timothy Hinton on Gareth Moore's Philosophy of God". New Blackfriars. 102 (1097): 22–29. doi:10.1111/nbfr.12626.
- Hinton, Timothy (January 2021). "Closing Arguments for the Defence". New Blackfriars. 102 (1097): 30–40. doi:10.1111/nbfr.12625.
