= Klaus Hemmerle =

Roman Catholic bishop in Aachen, Germany

Klaus Hemmerle (April 3, 1929 in Freiburg im Breisgau – January 23, 1994 in Aachen) was a Roman Catholic bishop in Aachen, Germany. He was ordained as a priest in 1952 and became bishop of the Diocese of Aachen in 1975. He was inspired by Chiara Lubich, who said she was also inspired by him and considered him one of the co-founders of the Focolare Movement due to his teachings on theology and philosophy, and particularly his views on plural thinking and unity.

== Additional sources ==
- Literature by and about Klaus Hemmerle in the German National Library catalogue
- Ekkart Sauser (1998). "Hemmerle, Klaus". In Bautz, Traugott (ed.). Biographisch-Bibliographisches Kirchenlexikon (BBKL) (in German). Vol. 14. Herzberg: Bautz. cols. 1084–1086. ISBN 3-88309-073-5.
- Wilfried Hagemann: Verliebt in Gottes Wort. Leben, Denken und Wirken von Klaus Hemmerle, Bischof von Aachen. Würzburg, Echter, 2008. ISBN 978-3-429-03052-0
- Thorsten Obst: Das Heilige und das Denken. Untersuchungen zur Phänomenologie des Heiligen bei Klaus Hammerle. Würzburg, Echter, 2010. ISBN 978-3-429-03316-3
- Klaus Meyer-Schwickerath (2010), Wegbereiter des Lichts : Prof. Klaus Hemmerle, Bischof von Aachen 1975–1994 und Prof. Gerd Meyer-Schwickerath, Direktor der Augenklinik Essen 1959–1985 (in German), Aachen: Mainz, ISBN 978-3-8107-0094-0
