= Omerbach =

River in Germany

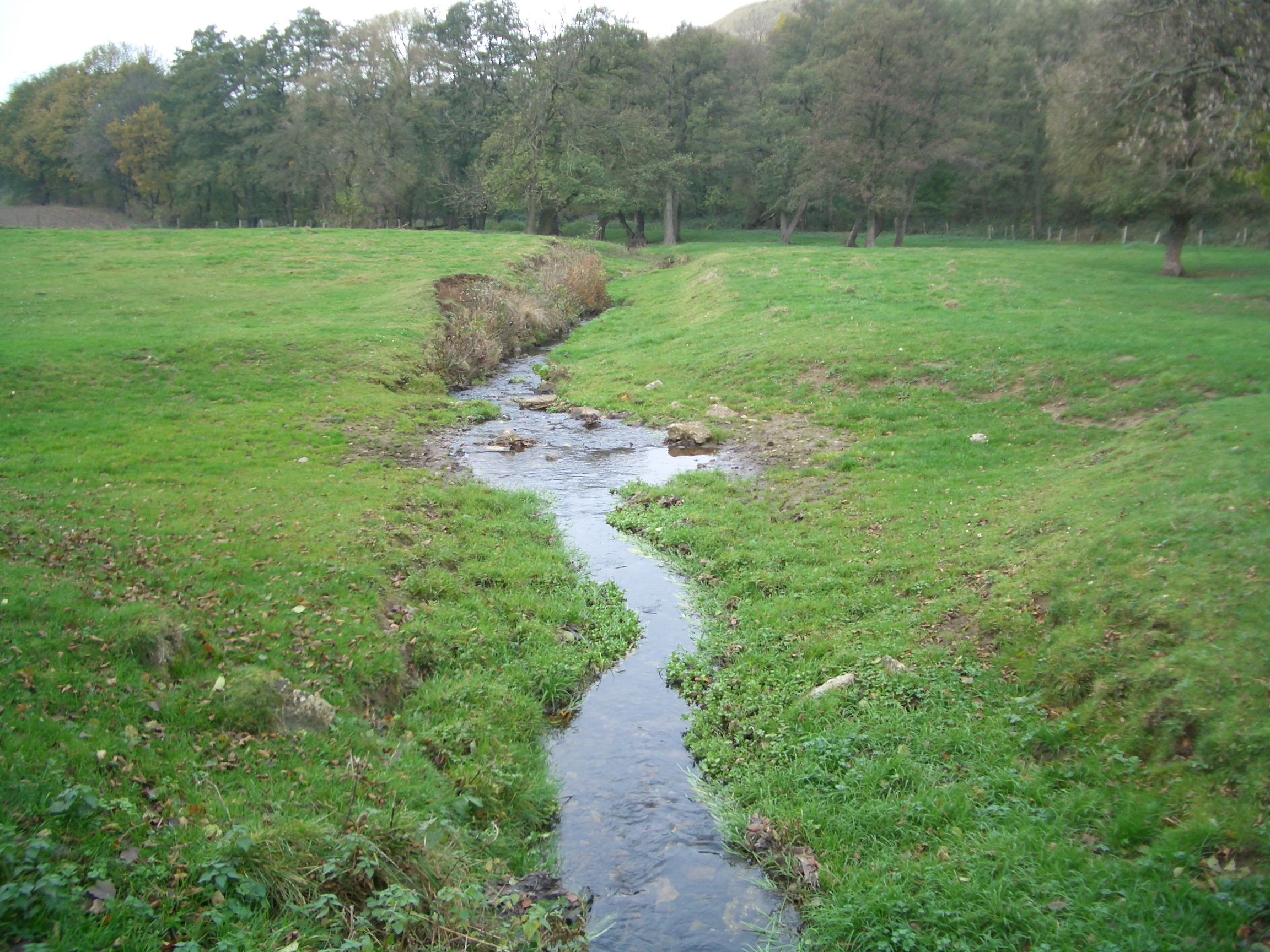

Location
- Country: Germany
- State: North Rhine-Westphalia

Physical characteristics
- Mouth
  - location: Inde
  - coordinates: 50.8152°N 6.2922°E

Basin features
- Progression: Inde→ Rur→ Meuse→ North Sea

Omerbach is a river of North Rhine-Westphalia, Germany. It is 11 km (6.8 mi) long and flows as a right tributary into the Inde near Eschweiler.

== See also ==
- List of rivers of North Rhine-Westphalia
