= Heinrich Mussinghoff =

His Excellency Heinrich Mussinghoff
- Bishop emeritus of Aachen
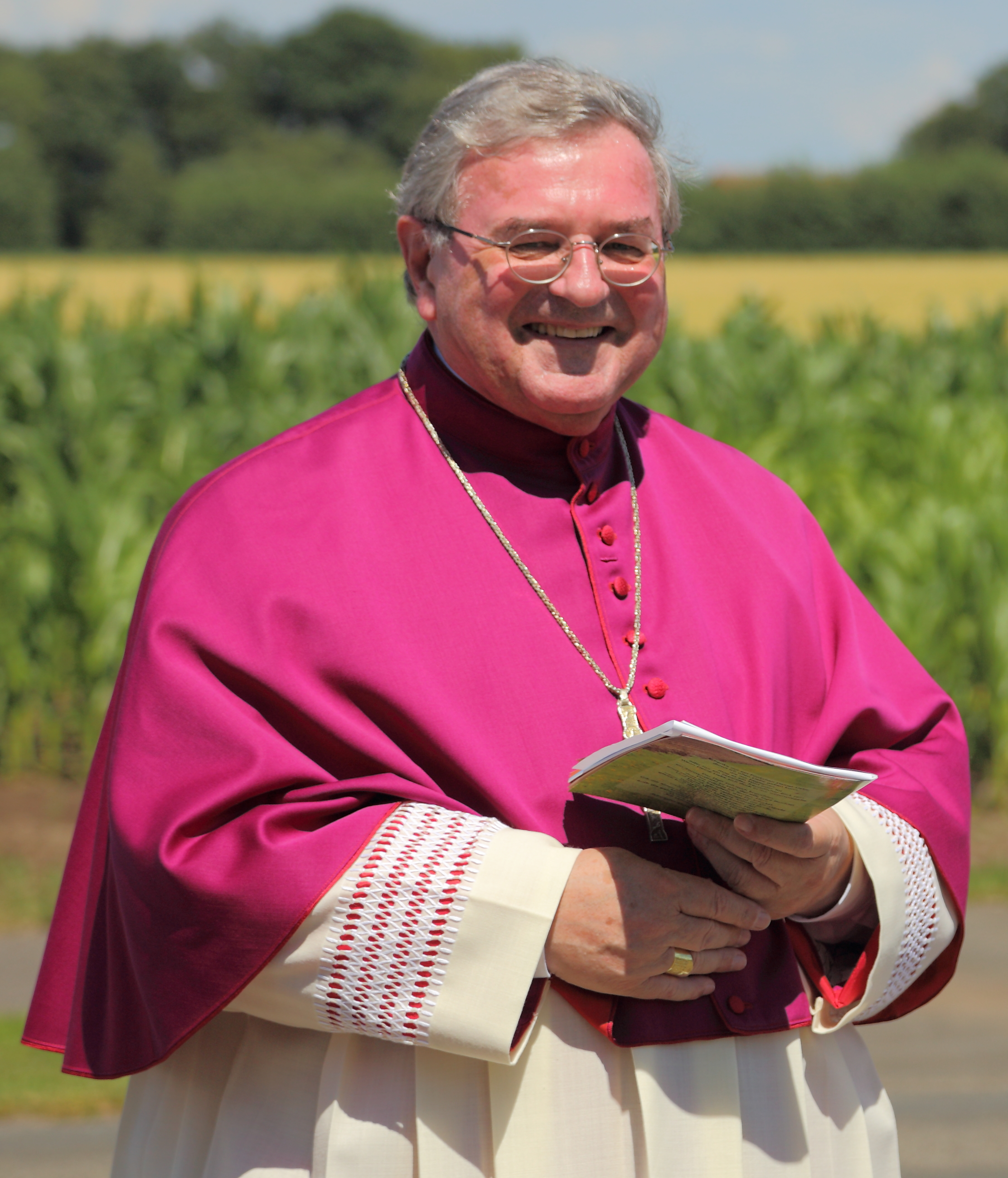
- Church: Roman Catholic
- Diocese: Aachen
- Appointed: 12 December 1994
- Installed: 11 February 1995
- Predecessor: Klaus Hemmerle

Orders
- Ordination: 29 June 1968 by Joseph Höffner
- Consecration: 11 February 1995 by Joachim Meisner

Personal details
- Born: 29 October 1940 (age 85) Osterwick
- Motto: Parate viam domini
- Coat of arms

Most Reverend Dr. Heinrich Mussinghoff (born 29 October 1940) was the Roman Catholic Bishop of the Aachen, Germany, from 11 February 1995 until the acceptance of his resignation on 8 December 2015.

Born in Osterwick (now Rosendahl) in northwestern Westphalia, he studied philosophy and theology in Münster and Freiburg. In 1968 he was consecrated as priest in Münster by Bishop Joseph Höffner. He first worked as chaplain of Herten, then became secretary of Bishop Heinrich Tenhumberg.

In December 1994 he was appointed bishop of Aachen, and was consecrated on 11 February 1995 by Cardinal Joachim Meisner in the Aachen Cathedral.

== Coat of arms ==
Coat of arms

The coat of arms of Heinrich Mussinghoff is based on the coat of arms of the diocese of Aachen, a black cross on a golden shield. The inner shield is based on the coat of arms of the diocese of Münster, a red bar on golden ground. In the upper left corner of the inner shield is an eight-cornered star, resembling the Octagon of the Aachen Cathedral as well as the eight regions of the diocese. The star symbolizes the morning star, which never sets beneath the horizon as a symbol for Jesus Christ. On the red bar are the silver Greek letters Chi and Rho as another symbol for Christ. The red rose in bottom both symbolizes the hometown Rosendahl of the bishop, but also Mary, patron saint of the cathedral, town and diocese of Aachen.

The motto of Bishop Mussinghoff is Parate viam domini (prepare the way of the lord), taken from Isaiah (40:3).

The coat of arms was designed by Ludwig Schaffrath.

== Resources ==
- Biography at the Diocese of Aachen (German)
