= Virginia Ramey Mollenkott =

American feminist (1932–2020)

Virginia Ramey Mollenkott (January 28, 1932 - September 25, 2020) was an American feminist writer. She was one of the leading academic figures of the 20th century evangelical feminist movement. Mollenkott spent her 44-year professional career teaching college level English literature and language, but developed specializations in feminist theology and lesbian, gay, bisexual and transgender theology during the second half of that career.

== Early life ==
Virginia May Ramey was born in Philadelphia's Temple University Hospital on January 28, 1932, to Frank and May (Lotz) Ramey. Her mother owned a grocery store and worked as a butcher, while her father was a chiropractor. The family were members of the Plymouth Brethren, a fundamentalist Christian church, and Virginia's uncle was an elder there. Virginia was abused throughout her youth and suspected that many people on her mother's side of the family had also been abused. Her father left the family when she was 9, which she later regarded as an act of survival. When Virginia was 10, she was beaten by her classmates and was not provided with treatment, enduring pain from the injuries for the rest of her life.

When Ramey was 11, the 21-year-old sister of one of her friends statutorily raped her. Ramey recounted that at the time, she felt loved and respected by the woman in a way that her own family had never provided. When Ramey's mother discovered a letter written from the woman to Ramey, the whole family debated about what they should do. They confronted the other family but also condemned Ramey, and decided to send her to a Southern Presbyterian boarding school. The family told the school that Ramey was a lesbian, leading to her ostracization. Ramey's favorite aunt later read her Romans 1 and told her that it condemned lesbians. Ramey was deeply religious and devastated by people's religious condemnations of her, eventually attempting suicide when she was 13.

During high school, Ramey began to reconnect with her father against her mother's directives. Ramey came out as a lesbian to her father, who responded that she would grow out of it.

== Education ==
Mollenkott earned her B.A. from fundamentalist Bob Jones University in 1953, her M.A. at Temple University in 1955, and her Ph.D. at New York University in 1964. All her degrees were in English. Her dissertation, "Milton and the Apocrypha", was on John Milton, and won the Andison Club Award for best NYU dissertation on English. During this time, she began to critically read the Bible as a work of literature as well as a religious text.

She received an honorary Doctorate in Ministries from Samaritan College in 1989.

== Career ==
Mollenkott became one of the leading academic figures of the 20th century evangelical feminist movement. She is especially notable for her commentary on Christianity and LGBTQ topics. Scholar Jeffery L. Bineham lists her book, Women, Men and the Bible, along with Letha Scanzoni and Nancy Hardesty's All We're Meant to Be and Don Williams' The Apostle Paul and Women in the Church, as quintessential evangelical feminist texts. Mollenkott wrote that evangelical feminists like herself believed that the Bible affirmed "the central tenets of feminism", but that the Bible was written in a patriarchal culture, and thus its cultural component must be interpreted.

=== English literature ===
Mollenkott began her career as a Milton scholar and teacher of English literature and writing. She chaired the English Department at Shelton College, Ringwood, New Jersey from 1955 to 1963 and at Nyack College from 1963 to 1967. She enjoyed teaching at Nyack, but when she realized she needed to divorce her husband, she knew she had to leave because it was a fundamentalist institution and would not allow her to remain.

She then taught at William Paterson University from 1967 to 1997, chairing the English Department from 1972 to 1976. Since 1997 she held the position of Professor of English Emeritus.

=== Theology ===
In addition to her teaching and literary research, Mollenkott began speaking and writing on religion. She was raised as an evangelical Christian, and began writing about theology to other scholars and broader evangelical audiences. Her work appeared in publications including Eternity, Christian Life, Christianity Today, Christian Herald, and His. In 1967, she published Adamant and Stone Chips: A Christian Humanist Approach to Knowledge. It was her first book, developed from lectures she gave at the Detroit Bible Institute. Mollenkott was the Chief Bibliographer for the journal Christianity & Literature from 1969 to 1979.

Mollenkott served as an assistant editor of Seventeenth Century News from 1965 to 1975. She was a stylistic consultant for the New International Version of the Bible for the American Bible Society. She recalls working on it while it was written from 1970 to 1978. She believed that she never would have received that invitation if she had been out as a lesbian. According to the American Bible Society's website, she served on the stylistic committee for a few months, and "when her sexual views were known she was immediately asked to resign".

==== Early evangelical feminism ====
Mollenkott met Letha Dawson Scanzoni in 1973, where the two became close collaborators and decided to co-author a book on Christianity and ethical issues. In 1975, Mollenkott decided to come out as a lesbian to Scanzoni. She felt Scanzoni should know before co-authoring their book because the social climate of the time was very hostile to LGBTQ people. Some time later, Scanzoni finished the chapter of the book pertaining to homosexuality, and both authors decided to prepare that chapter to be published as a standalone book.

Mollenkott became heavily involved in an influential organization for biblical feminists, which formed as the Evangelical Women's Caucus (EWC) in 1974. Mollenkott was one of the speakers at the EWC's first conference in 1975. The conference was named "Women in Transition: A Workshop in Biblical Feminism", and Mollenkott gave the keynote, where she argued that the Bible was written under a patriarchal culture, so not all of it should be absolutely followed in the present.^{:37} A publisher in the audience asked Mollenkott to write a book on Christianity and gender equality. This led to Women, Men, and the Bible, published in 1977 to widespread notice. The book's Christian feminism was approachable for women in conservative, patriarchal denominations of Christianity. Mollenkott also became more involved with the EWC as it grew.

In 1978, Mollenkott and Scanzoni published Is the Homosexual My Neighbor?, one of the first books to address Christianity and sexuality. Its support of homosexuality sparked considerable debate within the evangelical theological community. The book extended the arguments of the 1976 book The Church and the Homosexual by Father John McNeill. Mollenkott and Scanzoni presented biblical and scientific arguments for the acceptance of gay people. Their writing centered on exegesis of passages that mention homosexuality, including Genesis 19 and Romans 1.^{:77-78}

She became an associate of the Women's Institute for Freedom of the Press (WIFP) in 1977. WIFP is an American nonprofit publishing organization which works to increase communication between women and connect the public with forms of women-based media. She also was a member of the translation committee for An Inclusive Language Lectionary for the National Council of Churches from 1980 to 1988. The committee drafted a new, experimental lectionary for churches that wanted to use language that had less gender bias and was more inclusive. The lectionary's inclusive language became very controversial and led to death threats against Mollenkott and other committee members.

In 1981, the National Council of Churches sent Mollenkott as their representative to a D.C. rally for the Equal Rights Amendment, where she spoke in support of the act.^{:40}

==== The Divine Feminine ====
Mollenkott's 1983 book, The Divine Feminine, was an influential early biblical feminist work, and one of the first to highlight the Bible's instances of feminine language that referred to God. In the book, Mollenkott argues that the Bible is overlooked as a source of feminist inspiration and liberation. She examines stories of women in the text and interprets female imagery in ways that affirm the value of women. Mollenkott also argues that God transcends gender, by examining biblical metaphors for God that are feminine or motherhood-based. Some references to wisdom in the Bible cast it as a female divinity and others correlate it with the Holy Spirit or God. Mollenkott's arguments here are similar to those of Aída Besançon Spencer's in Beyond the Curse.^{112-114} Mollenkott's work was informed by the contemporary movements of second-wave feminism and the rekindling of goddess traditions.

Carter Heyward noted in a 1985 review that Mollenkott was able to argue for a lack of hierarchy between any Christian, especially between men and women, but left out non-Christians. This critique prompted Mollenkott to write a response declaring that she actually believed in a universality between religions and universal salvation for humanity. She explained that she approaches religious thinking by using the "symbol systems" of the Christianity that she grew up with.^{:121}

==== Later career ====
From 1980 to 1990, she was on the Board of Pacem in Terris, Warwick, New York. From 1989 through 1994, Mollenkott served on the Board of the Upper Room AIDS Ministry, Harlem, New York. For over a decade she was on the Board of Kirkridge Retreat and Conference Center, Bangor, Pennsylvania, starting in 1980.

She held a seat on the advisory board of the Program on Gender and Society at the Rochester (New York) Divinity School from 1993 to 1996. She has been a manuscript evaluator for the Journal of Feminist Studies in Religion since 1994. She worked as a contributing editor to The Witness from 1994 to 2000. Since 1997 she has served on the editorial board of Studies in Theology and Sexuality, based in the United Kingdom. She was a contributing editor to The Other Side from 2003 to 2007.

She has delivered hundreds of guest lectures on feminist and LGBT theologies at churches, conferences, universities and seminaries throughout the United States.

Mollenkott founded the "Sisterly Conversations" sessions at the Kirkridge Retreat, running them for over 20 years. John McNeill, a Jesuit psychologist, often co-led these retreats. These were one of several retreats for queer Christians that Mollenkott helped lead.

==== Omnigender ====
In Omnigender, Mollenkott talks about the harms of the gender binary and argues that it is more just for society to accept everyone across different types of sexual orientations and gender identities. She examines various religious scriptures and histories for different perspectives on inclusive gender models. Her key biblical reasoning for society to embrace a new omnigender model is that the Bible emphasizes human wholeness and Jesus focuses on inclusion.^{:123}

== Awards ==
In 1992 Mollenkott received the New Jersey Lesbian and Gay Achievement Award, and in 1999 received a Lifetime Achievement Award from SAGE (Senior Action in a Gay Environment). In 2017 she received the inaugural Mother Eagle Award from the Gay Christian Network and Christian Feminism Today for her LGBTQ advocacy work.

She has also won awards for her writing. Is the Homosexual My Neighbor: A Positive Christian Response won the Integrity Award in 1979. In 2002, her book Omnigender: A Trans-Religious Approach won the Lambda Literary Award for Bisexual/Transgender Literature and the Ben Franklin Award.

== Personal life ==
Mollenkott identified as a lesbian in high school and was able to stay more closeted in college. Two closeted lesbian teachers of hers suggested that she marry a man in order to remain closeted. They suggested that she could grow attracted to men over time after she was married, and Mollenkott decided to marry on that hope, as well as a means to get away from her mother. Mollenkott married Frederick H. Mollenkott on June 17, 1954, with whom she had a son, Paul F. Mollenkott, on July 3, 1958.

Mollenkott began learning about feminism after realizing that she was forced to take on far more gendered labor at work and at home than the men around her. She recounted later that her husband felt he owned her, and after her husband found out she was a lesbian, he told her "that if I were a normal woman, I would love to obey him". She felt trapped in her marriage, especially due to the fundamentalist beliefs she was raised with. After reading John Milton's writings on scriptural reasons for divorce, as well as learning about feminism from The Feminine Mystique, she was able to justify a divorce. Her husband threatened to charge her in court for being a lesbian, which would have endangered her custody of her son, but her psychologist convinced him not to. The Mollenkotts divorced in July 1973.

Mollenkott's partner from 1980 to 1996 was Debra L. Morrison, a financial planner.

A Democrat and trans-religious scholar, Mollenkott lived with her domestic partner Judith Suzannah Tilton at Cedar Crest Retirement Village until Judith's death in February 2018; together they co-grandmothered Mollenkott's three granddaughters. Ramey and Tilton married in 2013 following the United States Supreme Court decision in United States v. Windsor, which overturned a law that denied federal benefits to same-sex couples.

In 2018, Mollenkott identified as "bi-gender, inwardly identifying myself with males as well as females".

Mollenkott died on September 25, 2020, at her New Jersey home.

== Writing ==
Mollenkott's books are listed below.

- Adamant and Stone Chips, 1967
- In Search of Balance, 1969
- Women, Men and the Bible, 1977 (revised 1988)
- Speech, Silence, Action: The Cycle of Faith 1980
- Is the Homosexual My Neighbor: A Positive Christian Response, 1978 (revised 1994) co-authored with Letha Dawson Scanzoni
- The Divine Feminine: Biblical Imagery of God as Female, 1983 (reprinted 2014)
- Views from the Intersection, 1984 (with Catherine Barry)
- Godding; Human Responsibility and the Bible, 1987
- Sensuous Spirituality: Out from Fundamentalism, 1982 (revised 2008)
- Omnigender: A Trans-Religious Approach, 2001 (revised 2007)
- Transgender Journeys, 2003 (reprinted 2010), co-authored with Vanessa Sheridan
- Fourth chapter of Transforming the Faiths of our Fathers: Women who Changed American Religion (2004), edited by Ann Braude.
- Gender Diversity and Christian Community (2005)

She was a lifetime member of the Modern Language Association, where she served on the executive committee of Religion and Literature from 1976 to 1980. She was also a lifetime member of the Milton Society of America, serving on the executive committee from 1974 to 1976. She has published dozens of articles in scholarly and literary journals as well as church-related publications, and was an active founding member of the Evangelical and Ecumenical Women's Caucus, better known as Christian Feminism Today.

Mollenkott's archives are available at The Center for Gay and Lesbian Studies at the Pacific School of Religion.

=== Editing ===
Mollenkott edited a book of spiritual poems, Adam Among the Television Trees (1971) and a volume of inter-religious essays by Jewish, Christian, and Muslim women, Women of Faith in Dialogue (1987).

== See also ==
- Christian feminism
- Christian egalitarianism
- Christian views about women
- Homosexuality and Christianity
