= Homosexual clergy in the Catholic Church =

Catholic canon law, specifically Canon 277 §1, requires that clerics "observe perfect and perpetual continence for the sake of the kingdom of heaven and therefore are bound to celibacy, which is a special gift of God by which sacred ministers can adhere more easily to Christ with an undivided heart and are able to dedicate themselves more freely to the service of God and humanity."; for this reason, priests in Catholic dioceses make vows of celibacy at their ordination, thereby agreeing to remain unmarried and abstinent throughout their lives.

The 1961 document Careful Selection and Training of Candidates for the States of Perfection and Sacred Orders states that homosexual men should not be ordained at all. In 2005, the Church clarified that men with "deeply rooted homosexual tendencies" could not be ordained; the Vatican followed up in 2008 with a directive to implement psychological screening for candidates for the priesthood. Conditions listed for exclusion from the priesthood include "uncertain sexual identity" and "deep-seated homosexual tendencies". Despite church teachings, many Catholic clergy have engaged in homosexual relations, a fact which is known to the Vatican. Independent studies and observer estimates suggest that roughly 30% to 40% of priests in the United States may be gay, with higher informal estimates sometimes cited for specific regions or Vatican offices. Very few active priests are openly public about their sexual orientation due to church discipline and fear of retribution from leadership.

== Church directives ==
=== Careful Selection and Training of Candidates (1961) ===
The 1961 papal document entitled Careful Selection and Training of Candidates for the States of Perfection and Sacred Orders stated that homosexual men should not be ordained, saying that "religious vows and ordination should be barred to those who are afflicted with evil tendencies to homosexuality or pederasty, since for them the common life and the priestly ministry would constitute serious dangers".

=== Instruction Concerning the Criteria for the Discernment of Vocations (2005) ===
In November 2005, the Vatican completed an Instruction Concerning the Criteria for the Discernment of Vocations with regard to Persons with Homosexual Tendencies in view of their Admission to the Seminary and to Holy Orders. Publication was made through the Congregation for Catholic Education. According to the new policy, men with "transitory" homosexual leanings may be ordained deacons following three years of prayer and chastity. However, men with "deeply rooted homosexual tendencies" or who are sexually active cannot be ordained. No new moral teaching was contained in the instruction: the instruction proposed by the document was rather towards enhancing vigilance in barring gay men from seminaries, and from the priesthood. As the title of the document indicates, it concerned exclusively candidates with homosexual tendencies, and not other candidates.

The Catechism distinguishes between homosexual acts and homosexual tendencies. Regarding acts, it teaches that Sacred Scripture presents them as grave sins. The Tradition has constantly considered them as intrinsically immoral and contrary to the natural law. Consequently, under no circumstance can they be approved. [...] In the light of such teaching, this Dicastery, in accord with the Congregation for Divine Worship and the Discipline of the Sacraments, believes it necessary to state clearly that the Church, while profoundly respecting the persons in question, cannot admit to the seminary or to holy orders those who practise homosexuality, present deep-seated homosexual tendencies or support the so-called "gay culture".

While the preparation for this document had started 10 years before its publication, this instruction has been seen as an official answer by the Catholic Church to several sex scandals involving priests in the late 20th/early 21st century, including the American Roman Catholic sex abuse cases and a 2004 sex scandal in a seminary at St. Pölten (Austria).

The document has attracted criticism based on an interpretation that the document implies that homosexuality is associated with pedophilia or with sexual abuse more generally. There have been some questions on how distinctions between deep-seated and transient homosexuality, as proposed by the document, would be applied in practice: the actual distinction that is made might be between those who abuse and those who do not.

Two months before his death in 2005, Pope John Paul II, troubled by the sex scandals in the US, Austria, and Ireland, had written to the Congregation for Catholic Education: "Right from the moment young men enter a Seminary their ability to live a life of celibacy should be monitored so that before their ordination one should be morally certain of their sexual and emotional maturity."

=== Implementation ===
The Belgian college of bishops elaborated that the sexual restrictions for seminary and priesthood candidates apply equally to men of all sexual orientations. The Vatican followed up in 2008 with a directive to implement psychological screening for candidates for the priesthood. Conditions listed for exclusion from the priesthood include "uncertain sexual identity" and "deep-seated homosexual tendencies".

Archbishop Timothy Dolan of New York has been quoted as saying that the Vatican's directive was not simply a "no-gays" policy.

== Opposition to gay clergy ==
Over recent years Catholics on the religious right have tried to connect the incidence of homosexuality within the priesthood to the sexual abuse scandal facing the Church arguing, according to gay social critic Andrew Sullivan, that the direct root "was not abuse of power, or pedophilia, or clericalism, or the distortive psychological effects of celibacy and institutional homophobia, but gayness itself".

Cardinal Raymond Burke has called for the Church to be "purified" of its "homosexual culture". Bishop Robert Morlino of Wisconsin has suggested a "homosexual subculture" was wreaking devastation and the Church therefore needed to show "more hatred of homosexual sexual behavior". Michael Hichborn of the Lepanto Institute has suggested removing all gay clergy from the church, even though this might cause a shortage of priests.

== Estimating numbers ==
=== Historical incidence of homosexual clergy ===
In Adomnan of Iona's biography of Columba there is an anecdotal story about two priests with a strong attachment to one another "in a carnal way". One was Findchan, described as the founder of the monastery of "Scotic Artchain" in Tiree. The other priest was Aed Dub.

Peter Damian, in the 11th century, wrote a book called the Liber Gomorrhianus about homosexuality among the clergy in his own time period. He harshly condemned homosexual practice among the clergy.

In 1102, Anselm of Canterbury demanded that the punishment for homosexuality should be moderate because "this sin has been so public that hardly anyone has blushed for it, and many therefore have plunged into it without realising its gravity". It is argued that probably only in the 12th and 13th centuries that a mass condemnation of homosexuality began in Europe. This condemnation moderated considerably in the final decade of the twentieth century with the distinction now made by Catholic church authorities between homosexual orientation and homosexual activity—forbidding the latter while regarding the former as intrinsically disordered but not sinful in and of itself.

=== Inside the Vatican ===
Pope Francis has directly faced questions from journalists about whether a "gay lobby" effectively operates within the Vatican itself, and investigative journalists have caught several high-ranking Vatican clerics engaging in homosexual sexual activity or relationships.

In October 2015, on the day before the second round of the Synod on the Family, a senior Polish priest working in the Vatican, Krzysztof Charamsa, stated publicly in Italy's Corriere della Sera newspaper that he was gay and had a long-term partner. By doing so he had intended to draw attention to the Church's current attitude towards gay Catholics which he felt was regressive and damaging. In his resignation letter he thanked Pope Francis for some of his words and gestures towards the gay community; however, he also strongly criticized the institution of the Catholic Church for being "frequently violently homophobic" and "insensitive, unfair and brutal" towards people that are gay, noting the irony that he felt there were significant numbers of gay men active at all levels within the Church (including the cardinalate). He called for all statements from the Holy See that are offensive and violent against gay people to be withdrawn, citing Pope Benedict XVI's signature of the 2005 document that forbids men with deep-rooted homosexual tendencies from becoming priests as particularly "diabolical".

=== United States ===
Studies find it difficult to quantify specific percentages of Roman Catholic priests who have a homosexual orientation (either openly gay or closeted) in the United States. Nevertheless, several studies suggest that the incidence of homosexuality in the Roman Catholic priesthood is much higher than in the general population as a whole.

Studies by James Wolf and by Richard Sipe from the early 1990s suggest that the percentage of priests in the Catholic Church who admitted to being gay or were in homosexual relationships was well above the national average for the country. Elizabeth Stuart, a former convener of the Catholic Caucus of the Lesbian and Gay Christian movement claimed, "It has been estimated that at least 33 percent of all priests in the RC Church in the United States are homosexual."

The John Jay Report published in 2004 suggested that "homosexual men entered the seminaries in noticeable numbers from the late 1970s through the 1980s".

Another report suggested that from the mid-1980s onwards, Catholic priests in the US were dying from AIDS-related illnesses at a rate four times higher than that of the general population, with most of the cases contracted through gay sex, and the cause often concealed on their death certificates. A follow-up study the next year by the Kansas City Star found the AIDS-related death rate among priests was "more than six times" the rate among the general population in the 14 states studied. The report gained widespread coverage in the media, but the study was criticized as being unrepresentative and having "little, if any, real value". Bishop Thomas Gumbleton of the Archdiocese of Detroit, has suggested that this was because, "Gay priests and heterosexual priests didn't know how to handle their sexuality, their sexual drive. And so they would handle it in ways that were not healthy." Additionally, the report suggested that some priests and behavioral experts believed the Church had "scared priests into silence by treating homosexual acts as an abomination and the breaking of celibacy vows as shameful". Gumbleton has gone on to argue that the Church should openly ordain gay men.

A 2002 Los Angeles Times nationwide poll of 1,854 priests (responding) reported that:

- 9% of priests identified themselves as gay, and
- 6% identified themselves as "somewhere in between but more on the homosexual side".

Asked if a "homosexual subculture" (defined as a "definite group of persons that has its own friendships, social gatherings and vocabulary") existed in their diocese or religious order:

- 17% of the priests said "definitely", and
- 27% said "probably";
- 53% of the priests who were ordained in the years 1982–2002 affirmed such a subculture existed in the seminary when they attended.

Shortly after the poll was published, the Vatican ordered an Apostolic visitor to examine American seminaries. The visitation began in 2005, and the final report issued in 2008. The report spoke about "difficulties in the area of morality [...] Usually, but not exclusively, this meant homosexual behavior." Steps were subsequently taken to deal with the issue, including correcting a "laxity of discipline".

=== Germany ===
In 2021 and 2022 several Roman Catholic priests outed themselves in action OutInChurch.

=== Italy ===
In March 2018 Cardinal Crescenzio Sepe, Archbishop of Naples, submitted a 1,200-page dossier to the Vatican that sought to identify 40 actively gay Catholic priests and seminarians across the country, after the list was compiled by a male escort called Francesco Mangiacapra.

== Homosexuality and the episcopacy ==
A number of senior members of the clergy have been alleged to have engaged in homosexual activity:

- Archbishop Rembert Weakland, who retired in 2002, was alleged to have been in a relationship with a former graduate student;
- Juan Carlos Maccarone, the Bishop of Santiago del Estero in Argentina, retired in 2005 after video surfaced showing him engaged in homosexual acts;
- Francisco Domingo Barbosa Da Silveira, the Bishop of Minas in Uruguay, resigned in 2009 after it was alleged that he had broken his vow of celibacy.

== Religious orders ==
The General Chapter of the Dominican Order held in Caleruega in 1995 "affirmed that the same demands of chastity apply to all brethren of whatever sexual orientation, and so no one can be excluded on this ground."

In February 2006, the president of the Religious Conference of Spain, Alejandro Fernández Barrajón declared that "[sexual and affective] maturity is what must be insisted on, when selecting candidates for priesthood or religious life. Conditioning persons on their sexual orientation is not evangelical. Jesus would not do so."

As stated in the Acts of the General Chapter of Diffinitors of the Order of Friars Preachers meeting, the text read "as a radical demand, the vow of chastity is equally binding on homosexuals and heterosexuals. Hence, no sexual orientation is a priori incompatible with the call to chastity and the fraternal life."

This series of meetings were conducted from July 17th to August 8th in 1995 in Caleruega, Spain. Radcliffe indicated that it really did not matter what sexual orientation a person has, but warned against potential division that could arise if sub-groups based on sexual orientation threaten unity and make it more difficult to practice chastity.

== Notable gay priests ==
- Robert Carter was one of the first priests to publicly come out as gay. He co-founded the LGBTQ advocacy group the National Gay and Lesbian Task Force.
- Krzysztof Charamsa announced he was gay and living with his partner on the eve of the Synod of the Family in October 2015. In response, he was immediately removed from his Vatican post within the Congregation for the Doctrine of the Faith.
- Daniel A. Helminiak is an American theologian, author, and a former Catholic priest. He is a professor in the Department of Humanistic and Transpersonal Psychology at the University of West Georgia, near Atlanta. He is most widely known for his international best-seller, What the Bible Really Says about Homosexuality.
- Mychal Judge (aka Michael Fallon Judge, May 11, 1933 – September 11, 2001), was a Franciscan friar and Catholic priest who served as a chaplain to the New York City Fire Department. It was while serving in that capacity that he was killed, becoming the first certified fatality of the September 11, 2001 attacks.
- Jose Mantero (born 1963) was the first out gay priest in Spain.
- John J. McNeill (September 2, 1925 – September 22, 2015) was ordained as a Jesuit priest in 1959 and subsequently worked as a psychotherapist and an academic theologian, with a particular reputation within the field of queer theology.
- Bernard Lynch became the first Catholic priest in the world to undertake a civil partnership in 2006 in the Republic of Ireland. (He had previously had his relationship blessed in a ceremony in 1998 by an American Cistercian monk). He was subsequently expelled from his religious order in 2011, and went on to legally wed his husband in 2016.
- James Alison, Catholic priest in the United Kingdom and Spain
- William Hart McNichols, Catholic artist in New York City

== Films ==
- Mass Appeal (1984) starring Jack Lemmon and Željko Ivanek as Deacon Mark Dolson, who is struggling with his homosexuality and church authority as a seminarian.
- Priest (1994) drama directed by Antonia Bird, and starring Linus Roache. The plot revolves around a Roman Catholic priest from Liverpool who struggles with his homosexual urges, causing him a crisis of faith.
- Saint of 9/11 (2006) a documentary about Father Mychal Judge, a New York City gay priest, chaplain with the New York City Fire Department, and the first victim of the 9/11 attacks in New York.
- Release (2009) is a prison drama from Darren Flaxstone and Christian Martin, recounting the tribulations of a gay priest who has been incarcerated for "what we are primed to believe is pedophilia."
- In the Name Of (2013) film about a closeted gay Catholic priest living in rural Poland.
- Amores Santos (2016) Brazilian documentary about homosexual priests (as well as leaders from other churches) that look for gay cybersex.

== Literature ==
Patricia Nell Warren's third novel, The Fancy Dancer (1976), was the first bestseller to portray a gay Catholic priest and to explore gay life in a small town. French journalist Frédéric Martel released the book In the Closet of the Vatican, which asserts that homosexuality and homosexual activity are rife amongst Vatican officials.

== See also ==
- Catholics United
- Courage International
- In the Closet of the Vatican
- Instruction Concerning the Criteria for the Discernment of Vocations with Regard to Persons with Homosexual Tendencies in View of Their Admission to the Seminary and to Holy Orders
- LGBT-affirming religious groups
- Ministry to Persons with a Homosexual Inclination
- New Ways Ministry
- On the Pastoral Care of Homosexual Persons
- Ordination of LGBT Christian clergy

== Bibliography ==
- David Berger, Der heilige Schein: Als schwuler Theologe in der katholischen Kirche, (2010) ISBN 978-3-550-08855-1
- Saunders, K. and Stanford, P., Catholics and Sex, Heinemann, London (1992) ISBN 0-434-67246-7
- Stuart, E, CHOSEN, Gay Catholic Priests Tell Their Stories, Geoffrey Chapman, London (1993) ISBN 0-225-66682-0
- Atila Silke GUIMARÃES, The Catholic Church and Homosexuality, Tan Books & Publishers, Charlotte (1999) ISBN 0-89555-651-0
- Tedesco, Mark, "That Undeniable Longing: My Journey to and From the Priesthood", Academy Chicago Publishers, Chicago (2010). ISBN 978-0-89733-599-7
