= Francesco Lepore =

Italian journalist and historian (born 1976)

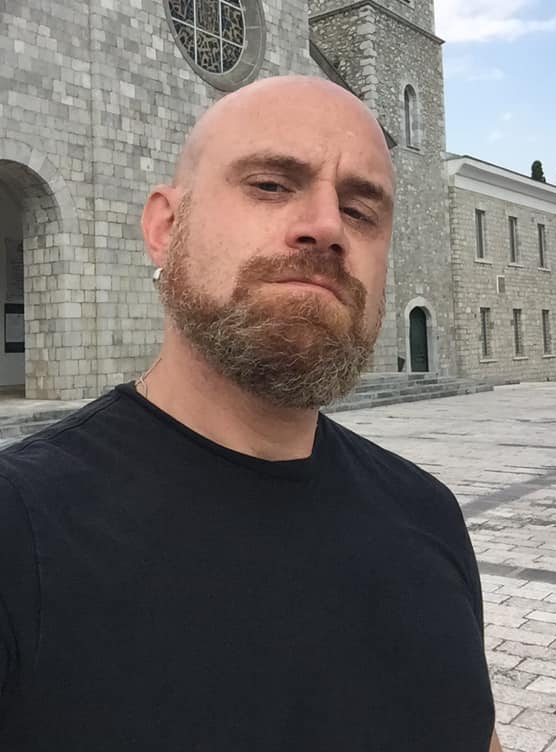
- Lepore in 2021
- Born: May 9, 1976 (age 50); Benevento, Italy
- Education: Pontifical University of the Holy Cross; LUMSA
- Occupations: Journalist, author
- Known for: Lgbtq activism and journalism
- Partner: Michele Nicolosi

Francesco Lepore (pronounce: Léhporeh), born on May 9, 1976, is a former priest of the Diocese of Benevento and minor official in the Roman Curia who became a journalist and an LGBTQ activist after leaving the church.

== Biography ==
Francesco Lepore was born on 9 May 1976 in Benevento, being the second child of the Latin teacher, medieval scholar and principal of Liceo, Carmelo and his wife Rita Prisco, French teacher. He entered the seminary in his hometown at the age of 15, feeling his vocation to the priesthood. On 2 July 1990, when he met John Paul II in Benevento, he handed him a letter in which he told of his vocation and the opposition of his parents. In the seminary Francesco attends the three classes of classical high school and the philosophical-theological five-year period. As he would later tell the sociologist Frédéric Martel, who dedicated the entire first chapter of the international bestseller Sodoma (2019) to his story, the reason that most prompted him to undertake the path towards the priesthood was the awareness of his homosexuality. Homosexuality, lived as a stain and sin to be expiated through a life spent in the service of Christ and others. In the seminary Francis lived years of ascetic rigor (including the use of instruments of corporal penance), intense prayer and profound study, observing the sixth commandment scrupulously until ordination, which took place on May 13, 2000, with a year of canonical dispensation linked to the young age. Lepore moved to Rome to complete his graduate studies at the Pontifical University of The Holy Cross, obtaining his licentiate of Sacred Theology in 2003.

=== Vatican career ===
Lepore moved to the Vatican on December 1, 2003, working as an official in Latin department of the Secretariat of State of the Holy See until January 31, 2005 Later in his career, he moved to Vatican library, becoming the secretary to the French cardinal Jean-Louis Tauran. In the years of his priesthood, which he left in 2006, Lepore has written books and articles on the history of Mariology. He earned a laurea in Ancient Literature at LUMSA University of Rome in 2006 with a thesis titled Spero eius me patrocinio salvari. Aspetti dell'omiletica mariana occidentale della seconda metà dell'VIII secolo (Spero eius me patrocinio salvari. Aspects of Western Marian homiletics of the second half of the eighth century), guided by Bruno Luiselli.

=== Post Vatican ===
After leaving the Vatican and priesthood, Lepore was an editor of GayNews.it published by Franco Grillini. Pope Francis signed Lepore's dispensation papers in August 2014, removing him from the clerical vows.

He is a columnist at Linkiesta, writing articles on LGBTQ rights and on the Vatican, and blogging in Latin. On his blog in Latin, entitled "O tempora, o mores", he comments daily news on politics, crime, health, customs, civil rights with a classical and at the same time modern style through neologisms, to the use of which he was introduced in the years of Vatican experience. For his journalistic and literary activity he received praise on from "the Times" and "the New York Times", which defined "Linkiesta" «an anti-populist and proudly elitist publication».

== Personal life ==
Francesco Lepore currently lives in Palermo with his partner.

== Bibliography – selected works ==
- Pax in virtute. Miscellanea di studi in onore del Card. Giuseppe Caprio (edited by Francesco Lepore and Donato D'Agostino), Vatican City: Libreria Editrice Vaticana. 2003. ISBN 8820974347.
- Il Sermone In festivitate sanctae Mariae Reginae Caeli di Davide di Benevento (sec. VIII ex.), Vatican City: Pontificia Accademia Mariana Internationalis. 2003. ISBN 889006093X.
- Signum magnum apparuit in caelo. L'Immacolata, segno della bellezza e dell'amore di Dio. Atti del Convegno diocesano (Benevento, 20-23 maggio 2004), (edited by Francesco Lepore), Vatican City: Pontificia Accademia Mariana Internationalis. 2005 (with preface of the cardinal Joseph Ratzinger). ISBN 8890060964.
- La Virgo Mirabilis in Paolo Diacono. Spunti di riflessione mariana tra admiratio, invocatio e imitatio, in "Theotokos", 16/1 (2008): pp. 231–243.
- Epifanio di Callistrato e la prosopografia mariana. Fortuna d'un genere letterario bizantino, in "Theotokos", 16/2 (2008): pp. 97–114.
- Vincenzo M. Orsini (Benedetto XIII) e la Chiesa del suo tempo, in "Rivista di Storia della Chiesa in Italia", 53/1 (2009): pp. 125–158.
- La figura della Vergine nella spiritualità monastica e nella liturgia dell'XI secolo, in "Theotokos", 17/1 (2009): pp. 33–49.
- Il Purgatorio ragionato di Francesco Longano (1729-1796). Storia ed edizione d'un trattato illuministico-massonico sulla purificazione ultraterrena (Vat. lat. 15366), in "Miscellanea Bibliothecae Apostolicae Vaticanae", 20 (2014): pp. 493–575.
- Seraphica charitas. Note storico-critiche sull'alcantarino Carlo di S. Pasquale (1818-1878), Vatican City: Libreria Editrice Vaticana, 2016. ISBN 8820997681.
- Stonewall. Memoria e futuro di una rivolta, (edited by Francesco Lepore and Yuri Guaiana), Catania: Villaggio Maori Edizioni. 2019. ISBN 8894898563.
- Il delitto di Giarre. 1980: un «caso insoluto» e le battaglie del movimento LGBT+ in Italia. Rizzoli Libri. 2021. ISBN 978-8817157407.
