= Sacred Love (disambiguation) =

Sacred Love is a 2003 album by Sting.

Sacred Love may also refer to:

- Sacred Love (film), 2016 Brazilian documentary film
- Sacred Love, 1969 choral composition by Georgy Sviridov
- Sacred Love, 2014 album by the Latvian Radio Choir
- "Sacred Love", 1968 single by The Breakaways
- "Sacred Love", song from 1986 album I Against I by Bad Brains
- "Sacred Love", song from Silencer (Nels Cline Trio album), 1992
