= Anne Eggebroten =

American author and feminist scholar

Anne Eggebroten (born 1948) is an American author and feminist scholar. She is known for her book Abortion: My Choice, God's Grace. She was also a founding member of the Christian feminist organization Evangelical and Ecumenical Women's Caucus. She received a doctorate in medieval studies from UC Berkeley. She has taught at California State University, San Bernardino and currently teaches at California State University, Northridge and contributes regularly to Women's enews and Christian Feminism Today. She has three daughters.

Eggebroten was strongly critical of a 2009 case in Brazil where the disgraced archbishop of Olinda and Recife pronounced an excommunication for an abortion after a case of incest.
