= Letha Dawson Scanzoni =

American scholar and author (1935–2024)

Letha Dawson Scanzoni (October 9, 1935 – January 9, 2024) was an American independent scholar, writer, and freelance editor. Born in Pittsburgh, Pennsylvania, she authored or coauthored nine books, the most well-known of which are All We're Meant to Be and Is the Homosexual My Neighbor? Scanzoni specialized in the intersection between religion and social issues.

From 1994 until her retirement in December, 2013, she served as editor of both the print and website editions of Christian Feminism Today (formerly EEWC Update), the publication of the Evangelical and Ecumenical Women's Caucus.

== All We're Meant to Be ==
Numerous scholars, whether they agree or disagree with the book's basic premise of gender equality, consider All We're Meant to Be to have been a major catalyst in launching the biblical feminist movement. It was preceded by two earlier articles Scanzoni wrote for Eternity magazine in 1966 and 1968.

Randall Balmer called the book a "landmark manifesto," Leora Tanenbaum said Scanzoni and Hardesty were "the first to offer alternative biblical interpretations to mainstream evangelicals." Sociologist Sally Gallagher said that All We're Meant to Be established its authors as "two of the most prominent voices in second-wave evangelical feminism." Pamela Cochran, in her book Evangelical Feminism: A History, said All We're Meant to Be was the "most influential work in helping launch the evangelical feminist movement" In As Christ Submits to the Church: A Biblical Understanding of Leadership and Mutual Submission, Alan G. Padgett said there was a "new hermeneutic" for interpreting the Bible "regarding the place of women in church, home, and society" and asserts that "by all accounts, the first major book on this topic by neoevangelicals was Letha Scanzoni and Nancy Hardesty's All We're Meant to Be: A Biblical Approach to Women's Liberation."

One of the conservative critics of evangelical feminism, Wayne Grudem, stated that the book reflects a "liberal tendency to reject the authority of Scripture" and that "while egalitarian positions had been advocated since the 1950s by theologically liberal Protestant writers, no evangelical books took such a position until 1974 . . .[when] freelance writers Letha Scanzoni and Nancy Hardesty published their groundbreaking book, All We're Meant to Be" Theology professor Jack Cottrell, in an online article titled "How Feminism Invaded the Church" said: "The major feminist writings during this period began with All We're Meant To Be: A Biblical Approach to Women's Liberation, by Letha Scanzoni and Nancy Hardesty (1974, then later editions). This was the early 'bible' of Evangelical feminism; it was called 'ground-breaking' and 'epoch-making.'" In Cottrell's opinion it and other books following such an approach to Scripture, falsely interpreted what the Bible teaches. According to the Encyclopedia of Women in Religion in North America All We're Meant to Be "became in many respects for evangelical women what the Church and the Second Sex (1972) by Mary Daly was for mainstream religious women" (p. 469).

== Is The Homosexual My Neighbor and What God Has Joined Together ==
When Is the Homosexual My Neighbor? Another Christian View, coauthored with Virginia Ramey Mollenkott, was published in 1978, the publisher reported that "some 16 different titles on evangelical Christianity and homosexuality [were] currently being published, with the Scanzoni and Mollenkott volume being the only one which takes a positive stand.

Scanzoni’s last published book was What God Has Joined Together: A Christian Case for Gay Marriage (HarperOne, 2005, 2006), coauthored with psychologist David G. Myers.

Al Mohler, President of Southern Baptist Theological Seminary, said, "Their book offers positive proof that what drives proponents of same-sex marriage is a psychological worldview that is directly at odds with the worldview of the Bible."

Rosemary Radford Ruether said: "Scanzoni and Meyers [sic] argue that accepting gay marriage, far from threatening marriage, will confirm and strengthen the ideal of marriage itself for all of us, heterosexuals and homosexuals."

== Personal life ==
Scanzoni received a B.A. from Indiana University (Bloomington) in 1972. Earlier, she studied at the Eastman School of Music (University of Rochester, NY), 1952–1954, and at the Moody Bible Institute (Chicago), 1954–1956. She married John Scanzoni in 1956. They were divorced in 1983. Scanzoni died on January 8, 2024, at the age of 88.

== Awards and honors ==
All We're Meant to Be was designated as Eternity Magazine's "Book of the Year" in 1975, and was later listed among the 100 Christian Books That Changed the Century, named by Christianity Today for its 50th anniversary issue as one of the "Top Fifty Books that Have Shaped Evangelicals" (2006), and included in Besides the Bible: 100 Books That Have, Should, or Will Create Christian Culture (2010)

== Bibliography ==
- Youth Looks at Love (Fleming H. Revell, 1964)
- Why Am I Here? Where Am I Going?: Youth Looks at Life (Fleming H. Revell, 1966)
- Sex and the Single Eye (Zondervan, 1968). Reissued as Why Wait? (Baker Book House, 1975)
- Sex Is a Parent Affair: Help for Parents in Teaching Their Children about Sex (Regal Books, 1973; revised updated second edition published by Bantam, 1982).
- All We're Meant to Be: A Biblical Approach to Women's Liberation, coauthored with Nancy A. Hardesty. (Word Books, 1974). Second edition (Abingdon, 1986), with a new subtitle, "Biblical Feminism for Today." Revised, expanded, updated third edition (Eerdmans, 1992).
- Men, Women, and Change: A Sociology of Marriage and Family – a college textbook coauthored with John Scanzoni (McGraw-Hill, 1976; second edition. 1981; third edition, 1988).
- Is the Homosexual My Neighbor? Another Christian View, coauthored with Virginia Ramey Mollenkott (Harper & Row, 1978. Revised, updated, expanded edition, Harper Collins (HarperOne imprint), 1994. In the 1994 edition, a new tag line, "a positive Christian response," was added after the title. This second edition also features an expanded preface telling the book's backstory. ISBN 0-06-067078-9
- Sexuality, a volume assigned by Westminster Press and written as part of its "Choices-Guides for Today's Woman" series, each volume addressing a single topic and given a one-word title (1984).
- What God Has Joined Together? A Christian Case for Gay Marriage (with David Myers, HarperOne, 2005, 2006) ISBN 0-06-083454-4
