= Queer theology =

Theological method related to queer theory

Queer theology is a theological method that has developed out of the philosophical approach of queer theory, built upon scholars such as Marcella Althaus-Reid, Michel Foucault, Gayle Rubin, Eve Kosofsky Sedgwick, and Judith Butler. Queer theology begins with the assumption that gender variance and queer desire have always been present in human history, including faith traditions and their sacred texts such as the Jewish Scriptures and the Bible. It was at one time separated into two separate theologies: gay theology and lesbian theology. Later, the two theologies would merge and expand to become the more general method of queer theology.

== Terminology ==
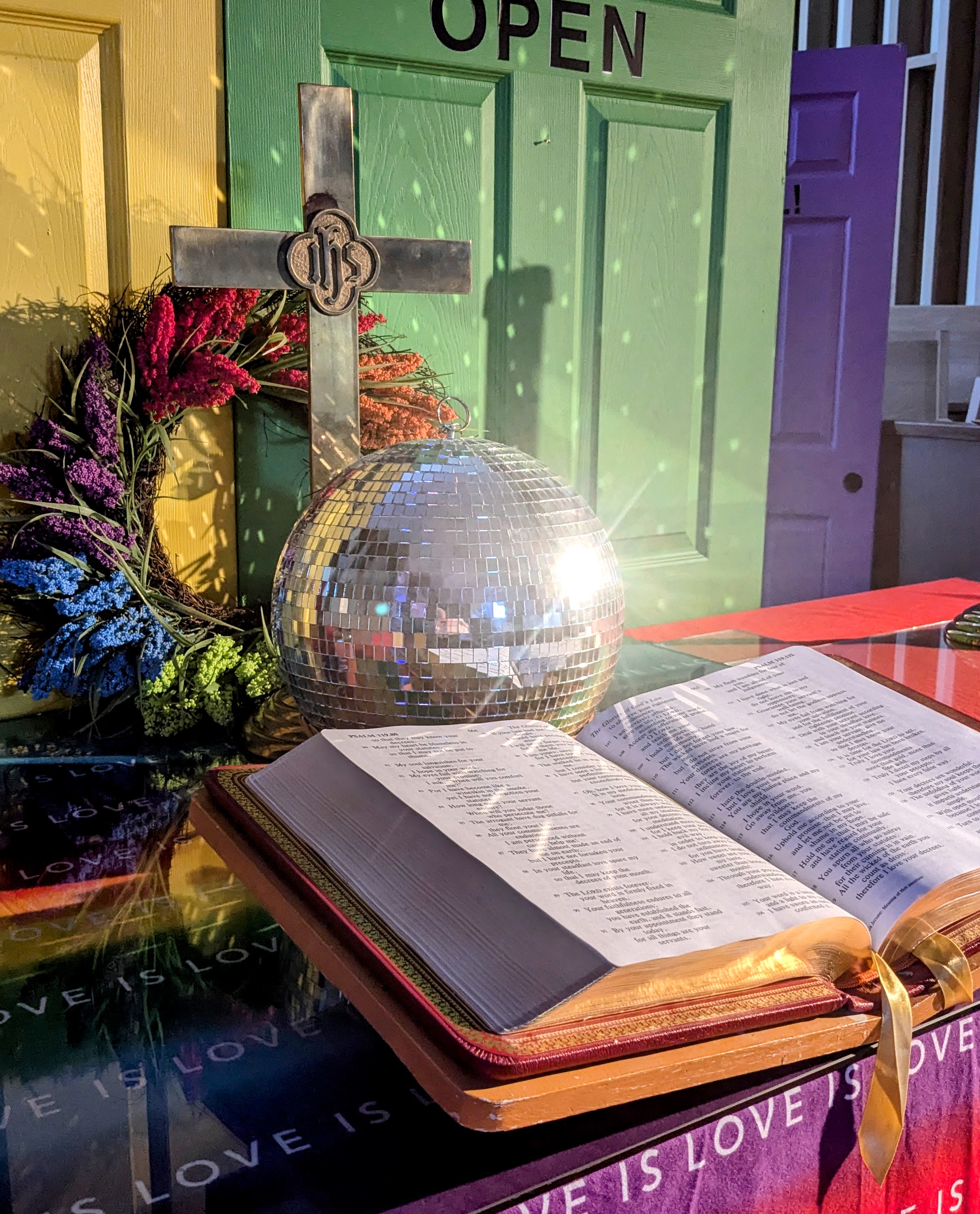
A church altar decorated with rainbow colors and a disco ball.

The term queer can be understood within queer theory as encompassing one of three meanings: as an umbrella term, as transgressive action, and as erasing boundaries. Its use has become more popular in social settings for personal identification and in academic settings, leading to the creation of programs such as the Center for LGBTQ and Gender Studies in Religion, a program created in 1996 at Pacific School of Religion. Building upon these three meanings of queer, queer theology can be understood as:

1. Theology done by, with, and for LGBTQIA (lesbian, gay, bisexual, transgender, queer, intersex, and asexual) individuals, focusing on their specific needs as stated by persons identifying within the LGBTQIA+ community.
2. Theology that purposefully opposes the fixity of social and cultural norms regarding gender and sexuality. It seeks to bring equitable value to marginalized voices, experiences, and perspectives that allows theology in queer people.
3. Theology that challenges and deconstructs harmful and historically imposed boundaries, particularly with respect to sexual and gender identity.

Queer theology is inclusive to individuals' sexual and gender identity and allows the LGBTQ+ community to reclaim what they see as their rightful space in Christianity and the imago Dei, as well as other religions and faith traditions. Furthermore, according to Jennifer Purvis, "queer" signifies not only a range of variant genders and non-heterosexual sexualities, but a posture of resistance, questioning attitude, and a set of techniques and approaches. For that reason, queer theology calls for thinking beyond what may be known, disciplined, and controlled and asks us to re-embrace our queer cognizance.

The term can be traced back to the 1990s, when J. Michael Clark proposed the term "pro-feminist gay theology" and Robert Goss used the term "queer theology."

== Theologians ==
One proponent of queer theology was Marcella Althaus-Reid, who drew on Latin American liberation theology and interpreted the Bible in a way which she saw as positive towards women, queer people, and sex. She proposed a theology that centered marginalized people, including people in poverty and queer people. For Althaus-Reid, theology ought to be connected to the body and lived experience. She put it this way:

Indecent Sexual Theologies ... may be effective as long as they represent the resurrection of the excessive in our contexts, and a passion for organizing the lusty transgressions of theological and political thought. The excessiveness of our hungry lives: our hunger for food, hunger for the touch of other bodies, for love and for God. ... [O]nly in the longing for a world of economic and sexual justice together, and not subordinated to one another, can the encounter with the divine take place. But this is an encounter to be found at the crossroads of desire, when one dares to leave the ideological order of the heterosexual pervasive normative. This is an encounter with indecency and with the indecency of God and Christianity.

One theme in the theology of her The Queer God (Routledge, 2003) is the holiness of the gay club, as she explores the intersection and essential non-contradiction of a strong, vibrant faith life and sexual desire. An example of finding otherness and desire in Biblical texts is her reading of Jeremiah 2:23–25 from the Hebrew, presented in her previous work Indecent Theology:

... a young camel deviating from her path: a wild she-ass accustomed to the wilderness, sniffing the wind in her lust. Who can repel her desire? And you said, "No! I love strangers, the different, the unknown, the Other, and will follow them."

In a paper read at the Conference of Modern Churchmen in 1967 titled "Jesus, the Revelation of God", Hugh William Montefiore offers a controversial interpretation of the early life of Jesus. Jesus was not aware of his vocation as Messiah until approximately age thirty, Montefiore argues, and this vocation can therefore not explain the celibacy of Jesus. Apart from the Essenes, celibacy was not a common practice in Jewish life. Montefiore suggests we might need to look for a non-religious reason to explain the celibacy of Jesus:

Men usually remain unmarried for three reasons: either because they cannot afford to marry or there are no girls to marry (neither of these factors need have deterred Jesus); or because it is inexpedient for them to marry in the light of their vocation (we have already ruled this out during the "hidden years" of Jesus' life); or because they are homosexual in nature, in as much as women hold no special attraction for them. The homosexual explanation is one which we must not ignore.

Montefiore finds the explanation that Jesus was homosexual consistent with his identification with the poor and oppressed:

All the synoptic gospels show Jesus in close relationship with the 'outsiders' and the unloved. Publicans and sinners, prostitutes and criminals are among his acquaintances and companions. If Jesus were homosexual in nature (and this is the true explanation of his celibate state) then this would be further evidence of God's self-identification with those who are unacceptable to the upholders of 'The Establishment' and social conventions.

John J. McNeill was an openly gay Jesuit priest and a vocal proponent of queer theology. His work focuses on the pushing of a new and evolving Christian structure that is truly inclusive of gay, lesbian, and bisexual Christians. He highlights the importance of acknowledging how far Christian mentality has come in its view of homosexuality but believes there is a long way to go. McNeill argues that it is not enough to demand acceptance but to strive for a Church that provides a community that allows for the spiritual and moral enrichment of gay, lesbian, and bisexual Christians. This inclusion can be achieved by engaging with gay, lesbian, and bisexual Christians and allowing them to not only participate in such a community but be leaders in the ministry.

Homosexuals within the Church have an obligation to organize and attempt to enter into dialogue with Church authorities. Church authorities in turn should show an example in terms of just behavior toward the homosexual minority by displaying an active willingness to hear, to enter dialogue, and to seek ways to resolve whatever injustice becomes clear as a result of dialogue. It is only by means of such a dialogue that the process can begin of separating the true implications of Christian faith and morality for the homosexual from the misunderstandings and prejudices of the past.

McNeill's book The Church and the Homosexual (Beacon Press, 1976) addresses queer theology in three sections: a history of the relationship between homosexuality and the Catholic tradition, finding where homosexuality belongs in a restructured traditional moral theology, and the shifts necessary in the modern Christian ministry that will allow gay, lesbian and bisexual Christians to thrive in their faith.

Others notable in the field include David Eng and Alice Y. Hom, authors of Q & A: queer in Asian America, Delroy Constantine-Simms, author of The greatest taboo: homosexuality in Black communities, Michael Hames-Garcia and Ernesto Javier Martinez, authors of Gay Latino studies: a critical reader and United Church of Christ pastor Yvette Flunder.

== Criticism ==
In February 2024, The Reformation Project, a Christian organization, announced that it did not support queer theology because it strayed too far from Christian values, but supported the inclusive theology. The Reformation Project supports affirming theology, which asserts that the Bible is inerrant but has been misinterpreted regarding LGBT people throughout history. Critics responded that the works of the queer theologians cited were the most absurd excerpts and were not representative of the whole.

== See also ==
- Side A, Side B, Side X, Side Y (theological views)
- The Bible and homosexuality
- Religion and sexuality
