= David Myers (psychologist) =

American psychologist

- Born: David Guy Myers; September 20, 1942 (age 83); Seattle, Washington, U.S.
- Education: Whitworth University (BA); University of Iowa (MA, PhD)
- Scientific career
- Fields: Social psychology
- Workplaces: Hope College, Michigan
- Thesis: Enhancement of Initial Risk Taking Tendencies in Social Situations (1967)
- Doctoral advisor: Sidney J. Arenson; Peter H. Murdoch
- Website: davidmyers.org

David Guy Myers (born 20 September 1942) is an American psychologist who is a professor of psychology at Hope College in Michigan, United States, and the author of 17 books, including popular textbooks entitled Psychology, Exploring Psychology, Social Psychology and general-audience books dealing with issues related to Christian faith as well as scientific psychology. In addition, he has published chapters in over 60 books and numerous scholarly research articles in professional journals. Myers is widely recognized for his research on happiness and is one of the supporters of the positive psychological movement.

== Life and career ==
Myers was born in Seattle, Washington, and graduated from Seattle's Queen Anne High School in 1960. He attended Whitworth University, from which he received his B.A. in chemistry, magna cum laude, in 1964, having been a pre-med student. However, his graduate work went in a different direction, that of social psychology. He received his M.A. in social psychology in 1966 and his Ph.D. in social psychology the following year for thesis titled Enhancement of Initial Risk Taking Tendencies in Social Situations, both at the University of Iowa.

Myers has spent most of his career at Hope College, rising from assistant professor (1967), associate professor (1970), and since 1975, full professor. He served as a visiting scholar at the University of Mannheim in Germany in the summer of 1974, and at the University of St Andrews in Scotland in 1985.

Myers has received fellowships and grants from the U.S. Public Health Service and the National Science Foundation and is a fellow of the American Psychological Association, the American Psychological Society and the American Association of Applied and Preventive Psychology. He is one of the most important authors of psychology textbooks and is the recipient of honorary doctorates from three different educational institutions. According to the Open Syllabus Project, Myers is the most frequently cited author on college syllabi for psychology courses.

== Books ==
=== Textbooks ===
- Psychology (with C. Nathan Dewall, 13th edition, 2020) 978-1319132101
- Exploring Psychology (with C. Nathan DeWall, 11th edition, 2019) 978-1319104191
- Psychology in Everyday Life (with C. Nathan DeWall, 6th edition, 2023) 978-1319498665
- Social Psychology (with Jean Twenge, 14th edition, 2022) 978-1260888539
- Social Psychology (with Jean Twenge and others, 8th Canadian edition, 2021) 978-1260327014
- Exploring Social Psychology (with Jean Twenge, 9th edition, 2020) 978-1260254112
- Myers' Psychology for the AP® Course (with C. Nathan DeWall, 3rd edition, 2018) 978-1319070502

=== Other books ===
- Psychology Through the Eyes of Faith (2002) 978-0060655570
- The Pursuit of Happiness: Who Is Happy--and Why (1992)978-1855382732
- A Quiet World: Living with Hearing Loss (2000) ASIN: B001CEU7BU
- The American Paradox: Spiritual Hunger in an Age of Plenty (2000) 978-0300091205
- Psychology Through the Eyes of Faith (2002) with Malcolm A. Jeeves
- Intuition: Its Powers and Perils (2002) 978-0300103038
- What God Has Joined Together: The Christian Case for Gay Marriage (with Letha Dawson Scanzoni, 2005) 978-0060834548
- A Friendly Letter to Skeptics and Atheists: Musings on Why God is Good and Faith isn't Evil (2008) 978-0470290279
- How Do We Know Ourselves?: Curiosities and Marvels of the Human Mind (2022) 9780374601959
