= Christian feminism =

School of theology

Christian feminism is a school of Christian theology which uses the viewpoint of a Christian to promote and understand morally, socially, and spiritually the equality of men and women. Christian theologians argue that contributions by women and acknowledging women's value are necessary for a complete understanding of Christianity. Christian feminists are driven by the belief that God does not discriminate on the basis of biologically determined characteristics such as sex and race, but created all humans to exist in harmony and equality regardless of those factors. On the other hand, Christian egalitarianism is used for those advocating gender equality and equity among Christians but do not wish to associate themselves with the feminist movement.

Christian feminists and scholars deconstruct biblical texts, interpretations of biblical texts and interpretations of important religious thinkers and figures for patriarchal readings that perpetuate sexism and misogyny. Some issues of concern include the ordination of women, equality within churches and other social structures, reproductive justice, women-centered spirituality and the masculine language and image of God. As feminist theologian Mary Daly stated, "If God is male, then male is God." Concerns also exist over how early Christian religious writings are interpreted to subordinate women today. Through feminist interpretations of biblical texts and Church fathers, Christian feminists advocate for, among other things, equality between men and women. Feminists construct models of theology consistent with women's needs and present the inconsistencies of concepts that emerge between the writings of religious figures and the Bible.

== History ==
Some Christian feminists believe that the principle of egalitarianism was present in the teachings of Jesus and the early Christian movements such as Marianismo, but this is a highly contested view by many feminist scholars who believe that Christianity itself relies heavily on gender roles. These interpretations of Christian origins have been criticized by secular feminists for "anachronistically projecting contemporary ideals back into the first century." In the Middle Ages Julian of Norwich and Hildegard of Bingen explored the idea of a divine power with both masculine and feminine characteristics. Proto-feminist works from the fifteenth to seventeenth centuries addressed objections to women learning, teaching and preaching in a religious context. One such proto-feminist was Anne Hutchinson who was cast out of the Puritan colony of Massachusetts for teaching on the dignity and rights of women.

The first wave of feminism in the nineteenth and early twentieth centuries included an increased interest in the place of women in religion. Women who were campaigning for their rights began to question their inferiority both within the church and in other spheres, which had previously been justified by church teachings. Some Christian feminists of this period were Marie Maugeret, Katharine Bushnell, Catherine Booth, Frances Willard.

During the 1960s and 1970s many evangelical women were influenced by the civil rights movement. Christian Feminists began writing and publishing articles concerning reproductive rights as well as inequality in marriage and in the religious hierarchy. In response to these articles, groups such as the EWC or Evangelical Women's Caucus, and the ESA or Evangelicals for Societal Action were formed in order to create a social movement in the church to address such issues.

== Issues ==
=== Women in church leadership ===
The division of Protestant belief systems into different denominations allowed for women to acquire far more leadership positions in the church, as certain denominations then had the freedom to advocate for female leadership. In both mainline and liberal branches of Protestant Christianity, women are ordained as clergy. Even some theologically conservative denominations, such as The Church of the Nazarene and Assemblies of God, ordain women as pastors. However, the Roman Catholic Church, the Eastern Orthodox Church, the Southern Baptist Convention (the largest Protestant denomination in the U.S.), as well as the Church of Jesus Christ of Latter-day Saints (LDS Church), and many churches in the American Evangelical movement prohibit women from entering clerical positions. Some Christian feminists believe that as women have greater opportunity to receive theological training, they will have greater influence on how scriptures are interpreted by those that deny women the right to become ministers.

=== Interpretations of gender based scriptures ===
Many of the Christian ideals concerning gender stem from interpretations of the Bible. Christian feminists have often argued that the Bible is problematic, not because of the text itself, but because of the Christian scholars who have interpreted the scripture throughout time. An example of these inconsistencies can be found in the creation story of Adam and Eve; some Evangelicals believe that Adam and Eve were created at the same time, while others believe that Eve was made from the rib of Adam. There is also wide debate within many Christian denominations over the fault of Eve concerning the consumption of the forbidden fruit, and the entrance of sin into the world. Historically, a great deal of blame has been placed on Eve, but many Christian Feminists have worked to reframe the story, and shift the blame equally between both parties, as both partook of the fruit. The story of Adam and Eve is just one example of a text which Christian feminists believe is patriarchal in nature due to its interpretation. Some Christian Feminists made the decision to abandon direct scriptural use in their fight for equality, while others relied on verses that opposed patriarchal ideals, pointing out the inconsistencies within the Bible. The following passages act as examples of these inconsistencies.

- Galatians 3:28. "There is neither...male nor female for all are one in Christ Jesus."
- Deborah of the Old Testament was a prophetess and "judge of Israel".
- Genesis 2:20. The word translated "help" or "helper" is the same Hebrew word, "ēzer," which the Old Testament uses more than 17 times to describe the kind of help that God brings to His people in times of need; e.g., "Thou art my help (ēzer) and my deliverer," and "My help (ēzer) comes from the Lord." Never once in all these references is the word used to indicate subordination or servitude to another human being.
- Genesis 3:16. "To the woman he (God) said, 'I will greatly increase your pains in childbearing; in pain you shall bring forth children, yet your desire shall be for your husband, and he shall rule over you.'"
- 1 Timothy 2:12. "But I suffer not a woman to teach, nor to usurp authority over the man, but to be in silence."
- 1 Corinthians 11:7–9. "For a man ought not to cover his head, since he is the image and glory of God, but woman is the glory of man. For man was not made from woman, but woman from man. Neither was man created for woman, but woman for man."
- 1 Corinthians 14:34. "The women should keep silent in the churches. For they are not permitted to speak, but should be in submission, as the Law also says."
- Colossians 3:18. "Wives, submit to your husbands, as is fitting in the Lord."
- 1 Peter 3:1. "Likewise, wives, be subject to your own husbands, so that even if some do not obey the word, they may be won without a word by the conduct of their wives."
- Ephesians 5:22–24. "Wives, be subject to your husbands as you are to the Lord. For the husband is the head of the wife just as Christ is the head of the church, the body of which he is the Savior. Just as the church is subject to Christ, so also wives ought to be, in everything, to their husbands."

Translations of biblical scriptures are examples where social hierarchy may influence the actual meaning of biblical scriptures. Although the pronoun him is often used in the scripture, Robert Alter, a Hebrew professor, argues that it is not "anatomically masculine." These variations in pronouns may lead to exacerbating the division between feminine and masculine roles and encourage the gender hierarchy. Furthermore, the separation between male and female is implied not only by the use of gendered pronouns, but also by the absence of representation of women and gendering qualities and tasks. Saint Augustine, a bishop of Hippo, wrote a tractate on John's Gospel and in the section about the Wisdom of God, he does not mention any female figure or femininity that the Old Testament regards within Wisdom literature. While it is unclear the reason behind the absence of women being mentioned in Saint Augustine's tractates, modern scholars argue that this information is too crucial in understanding the Wisdom in the Old Testament to be omitted.

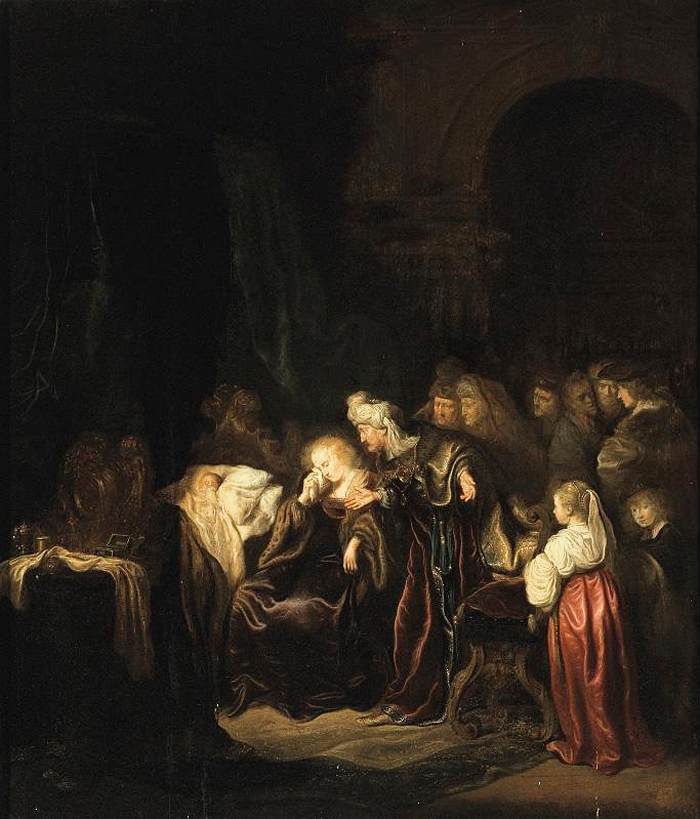
Painting depicting Bathsheba and David mourning the death of their son, Nathan.

On the other hand, by designating qualities to either be feminine or masculine, it creates expectations of how men and women must act. In the Book of Kings, they emphasize the role of mothers by the grief that they must display towards the death of their family members. Thus, even in royalty, the role of a mother is valued over queenship. For instance, in Samuel 2, when Bathsheba mourned the death of her son, she establishes her role as a mother. Then, as there are specific traits that are expected of women, if they fail to meet these qualities, then they are characterized as masculine. Contrasting Bathsheba's display of her maternal role is Athaliah's massacre of the royals of Judah that led her to become the monarch for several years. Caused by her ruthlessness and headstrong personality, Athaliah is often described to display masculinity but also described as not being entirely masculine because of her identity as a woman.

=== Sexuality and reproductive rights ===
During the Reformation, theologians such as Martin Luther and John Calvin stressed the importance of chastity and marriage, leading to further repression of female sexuality within the Christian tradition. Many Christian feminists have stated that men in powerful religious positions have often used the scriptures, and teachings from theologians such as Calvin and Luther to both dominate and repress women's sexuality, a problem which Christian feminists believe needs to be solved immediately.

In more contemporary thought about reproductive rights, pro-life feminism in the United States started in 1970, arguing that women's equality can be ensured without access to legal abortion and emphasized abortion as physically and/or psychological harmful to women rather than helpful. During the 1970s the Feminists For Life (FFL) group argued that abortion was "a degradation of women and as an excuse for men seeking to exploit them." Pat Goltz, a member of FFL, explained abortion as "'an insidious form of enslavement to the Playboy’s ‘right to [sex]’ [that] has no place in the women’s movement'." FFL insisted that abortion allows men to avoid responsibility, such as paying child support. During the late 1970s and early 1980s, the New Right emerged and made impressive collaborations with the pro-life movement through financial support and political capital. Feminists for Life stated that their organization was nonsectarian and welcomed all religious beliefs, suggesting that individuals in the movement could hold Christian beliefs. However, the group's public position was broader than Christianity.

In the 1990s, Mary Krane Derr and Rachel MacNair, both part of Feminists For Life, publicized that early theologically influenced feminists such as Elizabeth Cady Stanton, who fought for women's right to vote, also argued against abortion. Derr, a pro-life feminist, used selections from Stanton's writing on anti-abortion titled Man’s Inhumanity to Women Makes Countless Infants Die: The Early Feminist Case Against Abortion. In this text, MacNair explains that early U.S feminists (first-wave feminists) "made clear that they regarded abortion as one of the greatest wrongs against women." During the 1990s, the Feminist For Life movement also distributed a pamphlet called "Over a Century of Pro-life Feminism" discussing feminists from Elizabeth Cady Stanton to Margaret Sanger as pro-life advocates who desired "a society in which women can choose reproductive alternatives that are truly life-affirming for themselves and their children." These writings by the FFL movement relied upon first wave feminists, who were anti-abortion based on theological arguments, to help support their modern pro-life feminist approach to abortion as a human rights issue rather than a theological issue. Ultimately, FFL's approach to using first-wave feminist rhetoric shows how Christian values from the earliest feminist movement have influenced general arguments against abortion without specifically referencing Christianity. Pro-life feminist literature has reflected a range of religious influences as some scholars utilize the consistent life ethic, viewing "human life as a continuum, from conception to natural death," which refers to a Catholic moral doctrine articulated by Cardinal Joseph Bernardin of Chicago.

At the turn of the 21st century, pro-life feminist and Harvard professor Mary Ann Glendon created Women Affirming Life (WAL), a Catholic pro-life group that desired to "define a new feminism" with many members of their group having background in law professions. Biblically influenced pro-life feminist Glendon wrote an article in 2003 describing second wave feminism as authentic feminism and "presumably antiabortion" while arguing that the rise of pro-choice feminism in 1970s promoted "a puzzling combination of . . . anger against men and promiscuity; man-hating and man-chasing."

However, conservative religious groups are often in conflict with mainstream feminist and liberal religious groups over abortion and the use of birth control. Scholars like sociologist Flann Campbell have argued that conservative religious denominations tend to restrict male and female sexuality by prohibiting or limiting birth control use and condemning abortion as sinful murder. Some Christian feminists (like Teresa Forcades) contend that a woman's "right to control her pregnancy is bounded by considerations of her own well-being" and that restricted access to birth control and abortion disrespects her God-given free will.

A number of socially progressive mainline Protestant denominations as well as certain Jewish organizations and the group Catholics for a Free Choice have formed the Religious Coalition for Reproductive Choice (RCRC). The RCRC often works as a liberal feminist organization and in conjunction with other American feminist groups to oppose conservative religious denominations which, from their perspective, seek to suppress the natural reproductive rights of women.

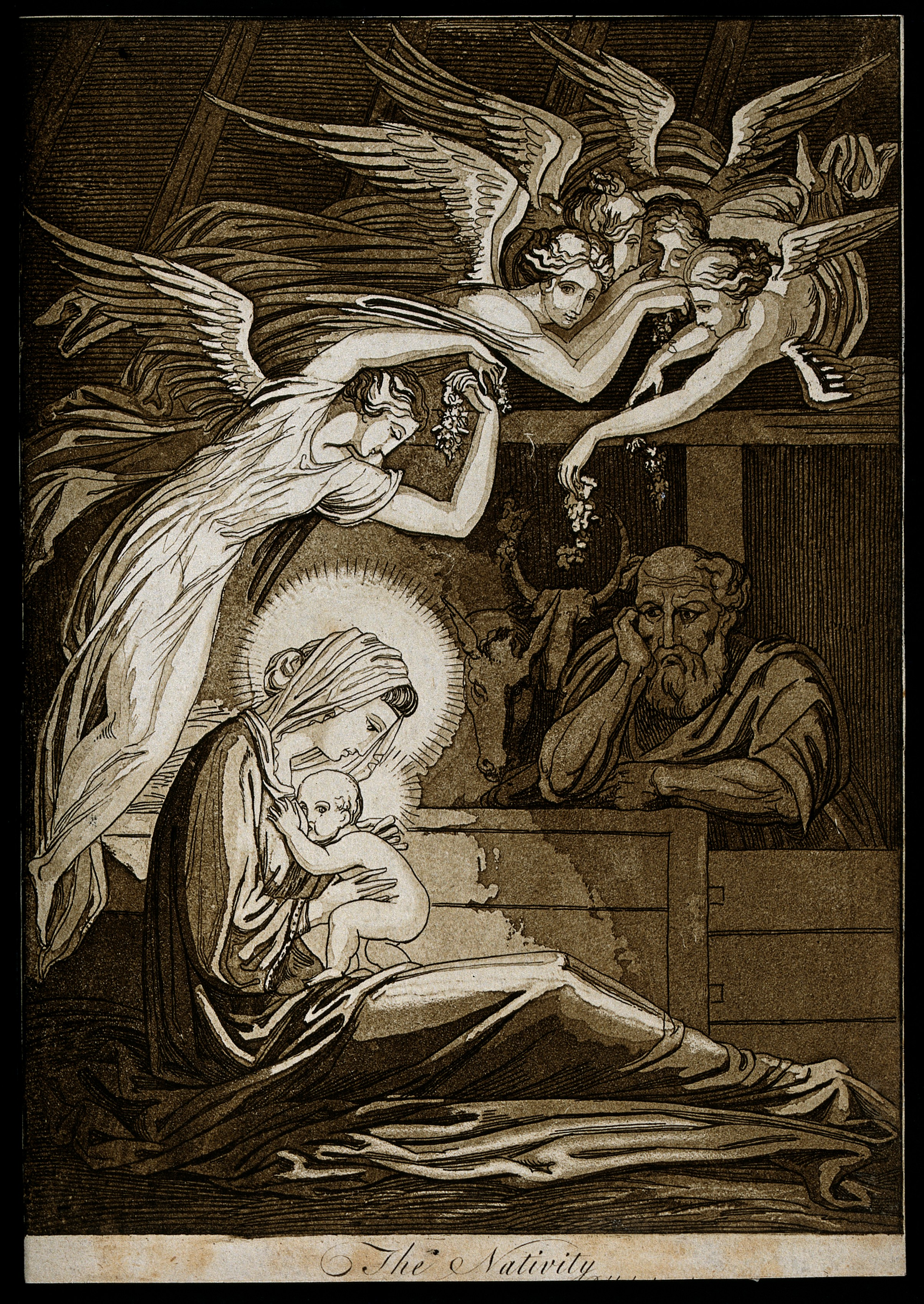
Female Centered Depiction of the Birth of Christ.

=== Feminine or gender-transcendent God ===
Some Christian feminists believe that gender equality within the church cannot be achieved without rethinking the portrayal and understanding of God as a masculine being. The theological concept of Sophia, usually seen as replacing or synonymous with the Holy Spirit in the Trinity, is often used to fulfill this desire for symbols which reflect women's religious experiences. How Sophia is configured is not static, but usually filled with emotions and individual expression. For some Christian feminists, the Sophia concept is found in a search for women who reflect contemporary feminist ideals in both the Old and New Testament. Some figures used for this purpose include the Virgin Mary, Mary Magdalene, Eve, and Esther. Others see God as entirely gender-transcendent, or focus on the feminine aspects of God and Jesus. A female depiction of the Christ figure, known as Christa, recently arose in an attempt to allow for the power of the Christ figure to be applied to both the masculine and the feminine. Some Christian feminists use and promote gender-neutral or feminine language and imagery to describe God or Christ. Christian Feminists also call for a gender neutral reading of the Bible, as male pronouns are heavily used as compared to female pronouns throughout the text. The United Church of Christ describes its New Century Hymnal, published in 1995, as "the only hymnal released by a Christian church that honors in equal measure both male and female images of God."

== Women and their roles in Christianity ==
The following are a few translations of Greek Christian texts and biblical texts that show the roles that women partook in the Christianity and their actions that exemplify a follower of God.

- Mary, the mother of Jesus, is a prominent example of the significance of women in Christianity. When she was approached by Gabriel the archangel, she has shown her devotion to God by accepting His summoning to become the mother of Jesus Christ, the Savior.
- In Ecclesiastical History 5.1.3-54, Blandina who was tortured remained strong despite the pain as she was guided by God's glory. She proclaims, "I am a Christian; we do nothing to be ashamed of," regardless of the sufferings she went through for being Christian.
- The section in Gerontius, Life of Melania the Younger 42-48 is about Melania's attempt to teach women the virtues of a Christian woman to fully serve Jesus Christ. She taught the importance of never being distracted by temptation and to dutifully follow the teachings of the Psalm. Furthermore, Melania inspires her fellow women to unwaveringly devote themselves to God and fight for their faiths.

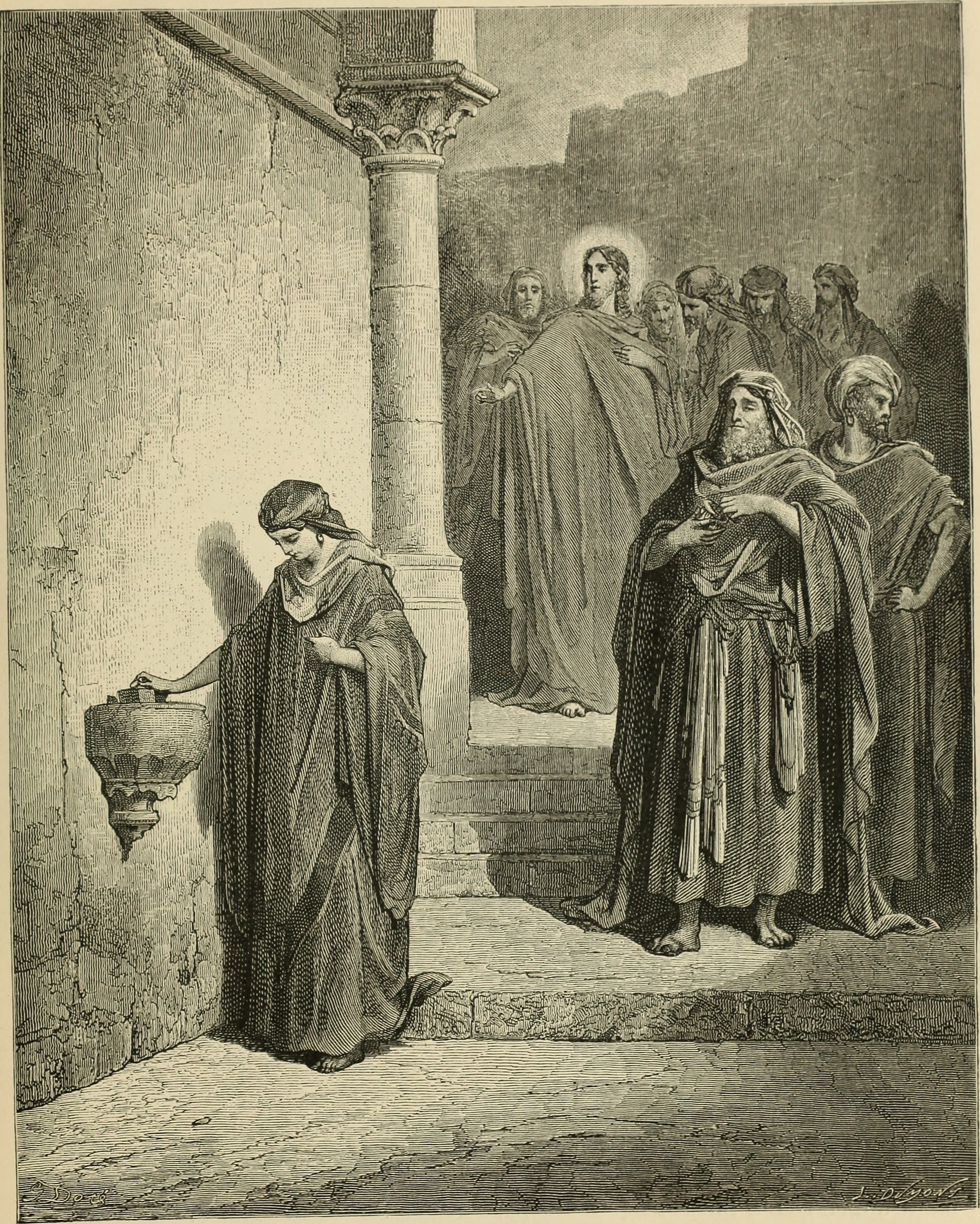
Depiction of the poor widow offering coins to the temple treasury which displays her trust in God.

- Paula of Rome is another female figure that has traits that are often ascribed to men by her being wealthy and influential. Like Melania the Younger, she lived the Gospel by opening monasteries for women and devoted herself to helping the less fortunate.
- In Mark 12:41-44, Jesus witnessed a poor widow offering two copper coins to a temple, and he declared, "Truly I tell you, this poor widow has put in more than all those who are contributing to the treasury. For all of them have contributed out of their abundance; but she out of her poverty has put in everything she had, all she had to live on."

== Contemporary Christian perspectives on women ==
In addition to learning the importance of women in Christianity through biblical texts, learning also about how Christianity affects women in the contemporary timeframe is crucial. This section demonstrates how the patriarchy interwoven into Christianity remains harmful to women even in contemporary society, whereas when Christianity is applied without implying the submission of women, it allows women to be able to fully participate in the religion.

In a research determining the effect of Christianity on domestically abused women, more complications arise in São Paulo, Brazil, in dealing with domestic violence when these situations are dealt by people influenced by the patriarchy that has woven its way into Christianity. In addition, these women are also troubled by the abuse they have experienced due to the teachings of the Christian faith. For instance, a woman, Adriana, said that despite being abused by her husband who is a policeman, she felt unable to leave her husband as she believed that her marriage was blessed by God. Upon admitting her situation to a pastor and his wife, they told her that fervent prayer will answer her troubles. To change Adriana's perspective, Edna, a psychologist and a woman who also grew up in a Pentecostal culture, helped Adriana navigate her husband's abuse and her faith. By doing so she allows Adriana as well as other women she has helped to reflect on whether the violence that they are receiving from their husbands is a situation that God would want them to remain in. In addition, there are religious figures such as pastors and priests that have told these abused women that their belief in God will bring change. Sometimes, these women are told that their abuse is caused by their own inadequacies.

On the other hand, amidst the patriarchal history of Japan, Japanese women who have been politically involved by demanding equal treatment congregated and founded the Woman's Christian Temperance Union which allowed them to support one another and flourish in their careers. A notable member of the organization is Ushioda Chiseko, a charity activist whose altruistic pursuits were driven by her Christian faith. Her contributions include advocating the role of women socially and politically and helped impoverished women gain vocational skills. Another notable member of the organization is Hani Motoko, who is known as the first female journalist in Japan. Through her participation in the WCTU, the organization helped Motoko gain attention to her works. Motoko's devotion to Christianity began when she enrolled in a Christian school. Later in her career as a writer, she wrote of a Christian orphanage that informed readers about how to help orphans have more resources and facilities through donations. Motoko also later established household reforms which promote that both men and women should share responsibilities in a home.

The articles mentioned above give insights both about how women show their devotion through Christianity and its impact on their lives and also how women are treated by people of the faith. As these accounts only focus on certain groups of Christianity, they should not be treated as though they reflect all contemporary women's experience in Christianity.

== Feminist theology ==
There are a number of academic journals dedicated to promoting feminist theological scholarship. These include:

- Journal of Feminist Studies of Religion
- Women-Church Journal (1988–2007), co-editors: Elaine Lindsay and Erin White
- in God's image, produced by the Asian Women's Resource Centre for Culture and Theology
- Feminist Theology

== Critiques of Christian feminism ==
=== Roman Catholicism ===
There have been multiple Popes, like Pope John Paul II and Pope Francis, who have referenced a type of Feminism in their addresses to the public. Pope Francis is quoted saying the "irreplaceable role of the woman in the family ... [t]he gifts of -delicacy ... which are a richness of the feminine spirit, represent a genuine force for the life of the family ... without which the human vocation would be unrealizable." Some men and women took Pope Francis words as a "vivid hope" that women will take a more prominent role in the Catholic Church. These same women and men also believe that "Radical Feminism" is the cause for the teachings of then Pope John Paul II to be viewed as negative, they also believe that Pope John Paul II was taking great strides, at least for his time, to include women in the church. 20th century figures like Dorothy Day and Mother Teresa show the diversity of possibilities for women in modern Catholic community.

=== Eastern Orthodox ===
Another branch of Christianity that tends to be conservative on the role of women, especially women's ordination, is Eastern Orthodoxy.

=== Southern Baptist ===
The Southern Baptist denomination has largely taken a complementarian position on women in recent years.

== See also ==
- Biblical patriarchy
- Christian humanism
- Christianity and abortion
- Christian views of marriage
- Complementarianism
- Evangelical and Ecumenical Women's Caucus
- Feminist theology
- Jewish feminism
- Gender roles in Christianity
- HerChurch
- Liberation theology
- Mormon feminism
- New feminism
- Political theology
- Progressive Christianity
- Religious feminism
- Sacred feminine
- TERF
- Women in Church history
- Women in the Bible
- The Woman's Bible
- Womanist theology
