= Sacred Love (film) =

Brazilian documentary

- Film poster
- Brazilian Portuguese: Amores Santos
- Directed by: Dener Giovanini
- Starring: Darico Macedo
- Release date: 2016
- Running time: 85 minutes
- Country: Brazil

Amores Santos, translated as Sacred Love or Sacred Loves, is a 2016 Brazilian documentary directed by Dener Giovanini.

In the film, actor Darico Macedo, who was 25 years old at the time of filming in 2014, engaged in virtual sex conversations with about 150 priests of various Christian denominations—mostly Anglican, evangelical, and Catholic—from thirty countries via social networks, like Skype and Facebook. Giovanini filmed about five hundred minutes of these conversations for six months (of 2014–15) starting from November 2014, including three months of webcam recordings. The engaged priests, some of which "Macedo had loving relationships and virtual sex with", had also publicly expressed anti-gay views.

The film was scheduled for January 2016 release. It was screened for the Rio Festival Gay de Cinema (Rio de Janeiro) in July 2016 and then the LesGaiCineMad film festival (Madrid) in November 2016. It was shortlisted as part of the official Documentary Feature Films selection for the Verona International Film Festival (Verona), but it lost the Best Documentary Feature Film award, i.e. an opportunity for an Italian screening premiere, to an Irish film Yximalloo.

== See also ==
- Christian views on homosexuality
- Homosexual clergy in the Catholic Church
