= Evangelical and Ecumenical Women's Caucus =

Evangelical Christian feminist group

The Evangelical and Ecumenical Women's Caucus (EEWC), also known as Christian Feminism Today (CFT), is a group of evangelical Christian feminists founded in 1974. It was originally named the Evangelical Women's Caucus (EWC) because it began as a caucus within Evangelicals for Social Action, which had issued the "Chicago Declaration". Its mission is to "support, educate, and celebrate Christian feminists from many traditions." It favored passage of the Equal Rights Amendment, encourages the ordination of women, and has called for gender-inclusive language in all communications. The word ecumenical was added to the organization's name in 1990 in order "to reflect the increasingly inclusive nature and the many traditions of [the organization's] membership".

In 1986 EWC passed a resolution by a two-to-one margin stating:

Whereas homosexual people are children of God, and because of the biblical mandate of Jesus Christ that we are all created equal in God's sight, and in recognition of the presence of the lesbian minority in EWCI [Evangelical Women's Caucus International], EWCI takes a firm stand in favor of civil rights protection for homosexual persons.

This resolution led Catherine Clark Kroeger and other more conservative members to form Christians for Biblical Equality.

== Meaning of the Organization's Name ==
The EEWC explains the significance behind its name on its website. The organization was originally founded primarily by women who were raised in conservative Christian traditions which identified as “evangelical”. As these women began to question the masculine focus, patriarchal structures, and exclusion of women that these churches engaged in they formed the Evangelical Women’s Caucus in 1974. Later the group added the word “ecumenical” to their name to include mainline Protestant and Catholic members. The term “caucus” was popular in women’s movements at the time, and was used to describe the organization’s purpose of challenging inequality in the church and society at large. The EEWC uses the term “evangelical” in its original meaning of “telling God’s good news.” However, the organization does recognize the political connotations of the term and so renamed their quarterly journal to Christian Feminism Today in order to better represent their mission and diversity of political stances. Many members of the EEWC refuse to concede that “evangelical” can only have a right-wing political connotation and so continue to keep the term in the organization's name.

== Schism of the EEWC and the CBE ==
=== Buildup during the 1980s ===
From the late 1970s through most of the 1980s, the biblical feminist movement faced several crises concerning the authority of scripture, particularly in the case of Christianity and LGBTQ+ issues. This eventually caused more conservative members of the EEWC to split from the mainline organization to form Christians for Biblical Equality (CBE). Since its founding, the EEWC had been more or less united in its focus on promoting Christian feminism and its mission of gender equality based on biblical teachings. However, as more intersectional feminist views began to spread within Christian feminist circles, heated debates broke out concerning evangelical attitudes towards homosexuality and what role the doctrine of biblical inerrancy played in constructing those attitudes. In 1978 Letha Scanzoni and Virginia Mollenkott published Is the Homosexual My Neighbor?, one of the first books of any Christian denomination to use biblical, sociological, and psychological data to argue against Christian condemnation of homosexuality. The book was especially charged in evangelical circles, to the point where Christianity Today named homosexuality the issue of the year. Scanzoni and Mollenkott’s historical and theological conclusions were hotly debated, and while their allies in the EEWC worked to expand the organization’s purview to LGBTQ+ issues, it was not until 1986 that change was truly enacted.

=== EEWC Conferences 1984 and 1986 ===
During the 1986 EEWC conference in Fresno, California, resolutions on widening the organization’s focus to include advocating for LGBTQ+ civil rights caused deep divisions in the organization. Many members believed that as a feminist organization striving for equality, the EEWC should support multiple civil rights causes and other social justice movements. Additionally, there was a significant minority of lesbian members of the EEWC who felt unsupported by their fellows, and desired this resolution as a gesture of solidarity. As early as the 1982 conference caucuses of “lesbians and friends” provided support for one another over ostricization from the evangelical church. During the 1984 conference, resolutions on the support of LGBTQ+ rights, the equal rights amendment (ERA), and social and economic justice were raised, but all save the support for the ERA were tabled.

Many members opposed these resolutions for the expansion of the organization’s focus to include supporting LGBTQ+ issues for several reasons. Some believed that by expanding their mission, the organization would lose their sense of focus on their claim that the Bible promotes gender equality. The program coordinator of the 1984 conference Kaye Cook argued that when contentious issues of LGBTQ+ rights and abortion were brought up the organization became polarized and had difficulty fulfilling its core mission. However, the driving force behind these policy issues was the contention over the status of LGBTQ+ people in Christianity. In the evangelical community theological debates over the morality of homosexuality were raging. Many evangelical theologians condemned homosexuality as an immoral and even fixable condition or sickness. Some, inspired by Scanzoni and Mollenkott, argued that the traditional condemnations of homosexuality in the Bible had been misinterpreted and actually referred to much more specific sexual relationships rather than sexual orientation. And some contended that while the state of being homosexual was not immoral, it should not be endorsed outside of a traditional Christian conception of romantic relationships (committed, long-term, monogamous unions). Those who opposed the resolution on supporting LGBTQ+ civil rights thought that expanding the mission of the EEWC in this way would make it even more difficult for the organization to reach its intended audience of evangelical churches that promoted gender inequality, due to their perceived endorsement of homosexual “lifestyles”.

The controversy of the 1984 conference led to a requirement to propose resolutions for approval before presenting them at the conference. During this conference, a resolution was proposed for the organization to recognize and support LGBTQ+ people.

Whereas homosexual people are children of God, and because of the biblical mandate of Jesus Christ that we are all created equal in God's sight, and in recognition of the presence of the lesbian minority in EWCI [Evangelical Women's Caucus International], EWCI takes a firm stand in favor of civil rights protection for homosexual persons.

The resolution passed, but was nonetheless controversial. Despite its neutral language, many members saw this resolution not as a simple recognition of the lesbian minority in the EEWC, but an acknowledgement of a “lesbian lifestyle” as congruent with Scripture. While the supporters of the resolution argued that the EEWC must move forward and continue to support a variety of civil rights causes, the organization would eventually split over this resolution. Members such as Catherine Kroeger left the EEWC, and was encouraged by 37 other women to form an alternate organization. Less than a year after the 1986 Fresno convention, Kroeger and 200 other women founded the Christians for Biblical Equality (CBE) organization in August 1987.

== See also ==
- Christian egalitarianism
- Homosexuality and Christianity
- HerChurch
