= In the Closet of the Vatican =

2019 book by Frédéric Martel

In the Closet of the Vatican: Power, Homosexuality, Hypocrisy
- Author: Frédéric Martel
- Original title: Sodoma: Enquête au cœur du Vatican
- Translator: Shaun Whiteside
- Language: French
- Subject: Homosexuality in the Catholic Church
- Genre: Non-fiction
- Set in: Vatican City
- Publisher: Éditions Robert Laffont, Bloomsbury Continuum
- Publication date: February 2019
- Publication place: France
- English publication date: 2019
- Media type: Print
- Pages: 576
- ISBN: 978-2-298-15110-7 (French edition); 9781472966155 (English edition)

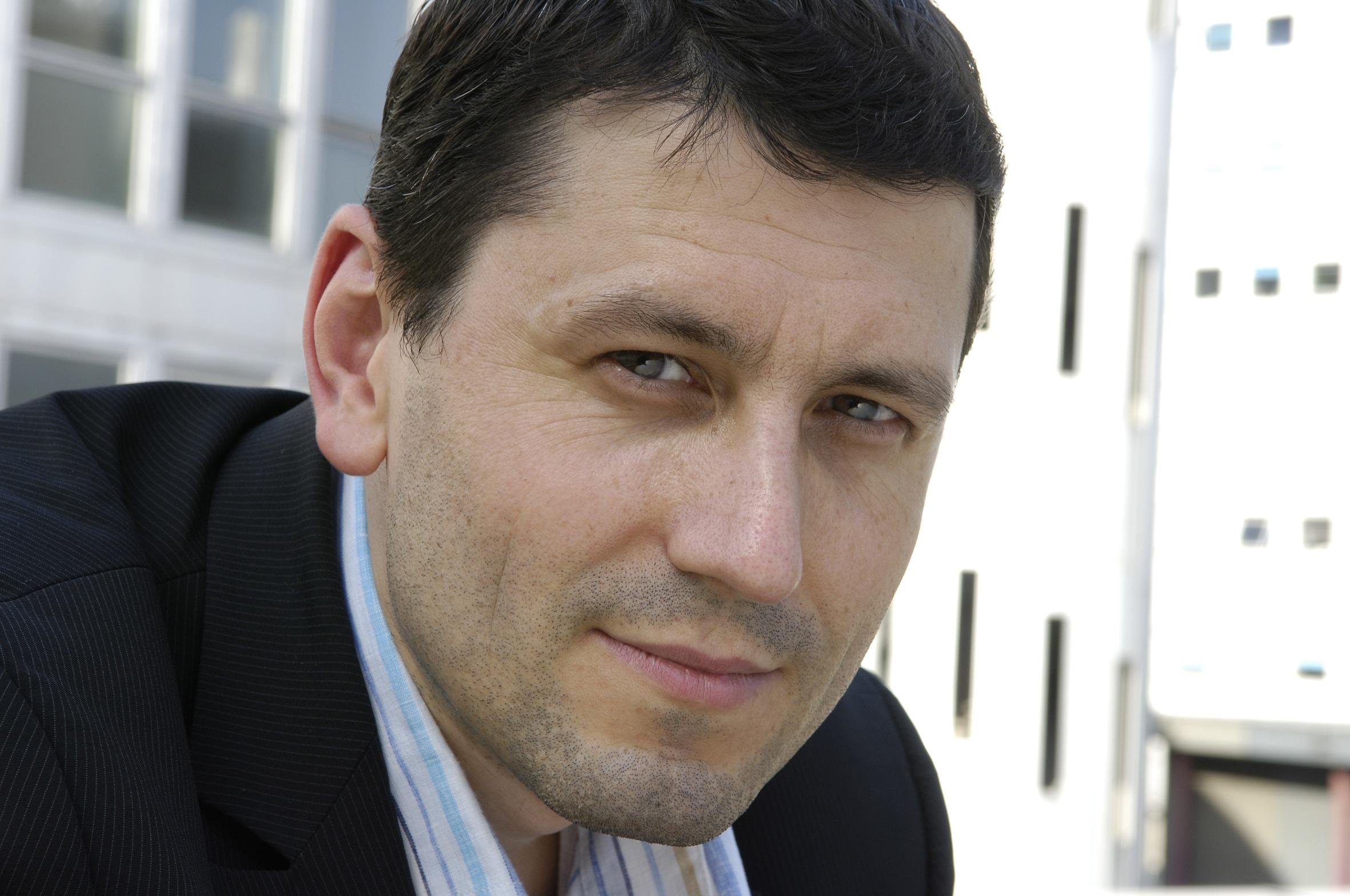
Frédéric Martel

In the Closet of the Vatican: Power, Homosexuality, Hypocrisy (French: Sodoma: Enquête au cœur du Vatican) is a book by Frédéric Martel, which was published in French by Éditions Robert Laffont in February 2019 as well as being simultaneously released in eight languages. The book is based upon testimonies from 41 cardinals, 52 bishops and 45 apostolic nuncios, some of whom are anonymous, as noted by the author. The author argues that an overwhelming majority of priests and bishops serving in the Vatican—including several prelates who have given anti-gay sex speeches—are gay, and either secretly have sex with men or repress their desires.

The book is not primarily about child sexual abuse by priests but instead investigates the everyday dishonesty of Catholic priests who lie about their sexual orientation.

== Reception ==
In a long piece for New York, Andrew Sullivan wrote that "The Corruption of the Vatican's Gay Elite Has Been Exposed". The book was praised by Irish writer Colm Tóibín in the London Review of Books, the British historian Sir Diarmaid MacCulloch on The Times and dozens of scholars and specialists. The book has been translated into more than twenty languages; it was a bestseller in a dozen countries and a New York Times bestseller.

In 2019, Steve Bannon announced his intention of producing a movie based upon the book, but Martel in 2026 "clarified that he never accepted Bannon's offer and never received any payment from him". This intention caused the resignation of Cardinal Raymond Leo Burke from the Dignitatis Humanae Institute, which is led by Bannon.

== See also ==
- Homosexual clergy in the Catholic Church
- Krzysztof Charamsa
- Priest (1994 film)
