= John J. McNeill =

American Catholic priest, psychotherapist and academic theologian (1925 – 2015)

The Reverend Father John J. McNeill
- Church: Roman Catholic

Orders
- Ordination: 1959 by Francis Spellman

Personal details
- Born: September 2, 1925 Buffalo, New York, U.S.
- Died: September 22, 2015 (aged 90) Fort Lauderdale, Florida, U.S.
- Spouse: Charlie Chiarelli (m. 2008)
- Education: Catholic University of Leuven

John J. McNeill (September 2, 1925 – September 22, 2015) was an American Catholic priest, psychotherapist and academic theologian in the United States, with a particular reputation within the field of queer theology. McNeill was awarded the National Human Rights Award in 1984 for his contributions to lesbian and gay rights, and was made the Grand Marshal of the New York City Gay Rights Parade in 1987. McNeill was expelled from the Society of Jesus in 1987 at the request of the Vatican.

== Biography ==
=== Early life and education ===
Ordained by Cardinal Spellman through the Society of Jesus in 1959, he obtained a Ph.D. from the Catholic University of Leuven in Belgium in 1964 and later taught at Le Moyne College in Syracuse, New York, and at Fordham University in New York City.

In 1972, he joined the combined Woodstock Jesuit Seminary and Union Theological Seminary faculty as professor of Christian ethics, specializing in sexual ethics.

=== Relation with the gay community ===
McNeill played a part in widening the activities of DignityUSA, a support group for LGBT Catholics.

In 1976, he published The Church and the Homosexual. The New York Times described the book as "the first extended nonjudgmental work about gay Catholics, a subject that had long been taboo in official church discourse. It has been credited with helping to set in motion the re-evaluation of the religious stance toward gay people – not only among Catholics but also among those of other faiths – that continues today."

According to Charles Curran, the Congregation for the Doctrine of the Faith systematically attempted to silence authors critical of the teaching of the Catholic Church concerning homosexuality, citing the "highlighting" of errors by the Congregation in McNeill's The Church and the Homosexual.

McNeill was expelled from the Society of Jesus in 1987 at the request of the Vatican, but remained officially a priest.

=== Death ===
He died at a hospice in Fort Lauderdale, Florida, on September 22, 2015, at the age of 90.

== Personal life ==
He was openly gay, and in 2008, he married Charlie Chiarelli, his long-term partner.

== In popular media ==
McNeill was the subject of a 2011 documentary film, Taking a Chance on God, by director Brendan Fay.

== Published works ==
- The Church and the Homosexual. Beacon Press. 1993. ISBN 978-0-8070-7931-7.</
- Taking a Chance on God: Liberating Theology for Gays, Lesbians, and Their Lovers, Families, and Friends. Beacon Press. 1996. ISBN 978-0-8070-7945-4.
- Freedom, Glorious Freedom: The Spiritual Journey to the Fullness of Life for Gays, Lesbians, and Everybody Else. Lethe Press. 1 December 2009. pp. 4–. ISBN 978-1-59021-148-9.
- Both Feet Firmly Planted in Midair: My Spiritual Journey. Westminster John Knox Press. 1998. ISBN 978-0-664-25808-5.
- Sex as God Intended, Lethe Press, 2008, ISBN 9781590210420

== Honors ==
- Grand Marshal of the New York City Gay Rights Parade in 1987
- The National Human Rights Award in 1984 for his contributions to lesbian and gay rights
- The 1989 Distinguished Alumnus Award from Blanton-Peale Institutes of Religion and Health
- The Humanitarian Award in 1990 from the Association of Lesbian and Gay Psychologists
- The 1993 Distinguished Contribution Award of the Eastern Region American Association of Pastoral Counselors for outstanding contribution to pastoral counseling
- The United Fellowship of Metropolitan Community Churches Special Award for his "dedicated work in spreading the Gospel to the lesbian/gay community"
- The 1997 Dignity/USA Prophetic Service Award "In Recognition of over 25 years of extraordinary work on behalf of the Catholic Gay, Lesbian, Bisexual and Transgendered Community"
- The 1999 Metropolitan Community Church of San Francisco "Living Saint" Award
- The 2005 "Roger Casement and Eva Gore Booth leadership Award" presented by the New York Irish LGBT group Lavender and Green Alliance

== See also ==
- Homosexuality and Roman Catholicism
