= The Church and the Homosexual =

Book concerning religion

- First edition
- Author: John J. McNeill
- Language: English
- Published: 1976
- Publisher: Sheed Andrews and McMeel
- Publication place: United States
- Media type: Print

The Church and the Homosexual is a 1976 book by theologian John J. McNeill. The book is notable in the field of moral theology in that it was among the first books to argue that the Bible does not condemn homosexuality.

== Summary ==
McNeill examines and challenges the Catholic Church's official, traditional attitude toward homosexuality which condemns the practice as a violation of God's divine law. He also seeks to establish that the Bible does not condemn homosexuality.

== See also ==
- Homosexuality and Roman Catholicism
