= Frédéric Martel =

French writer, researcher and journalist

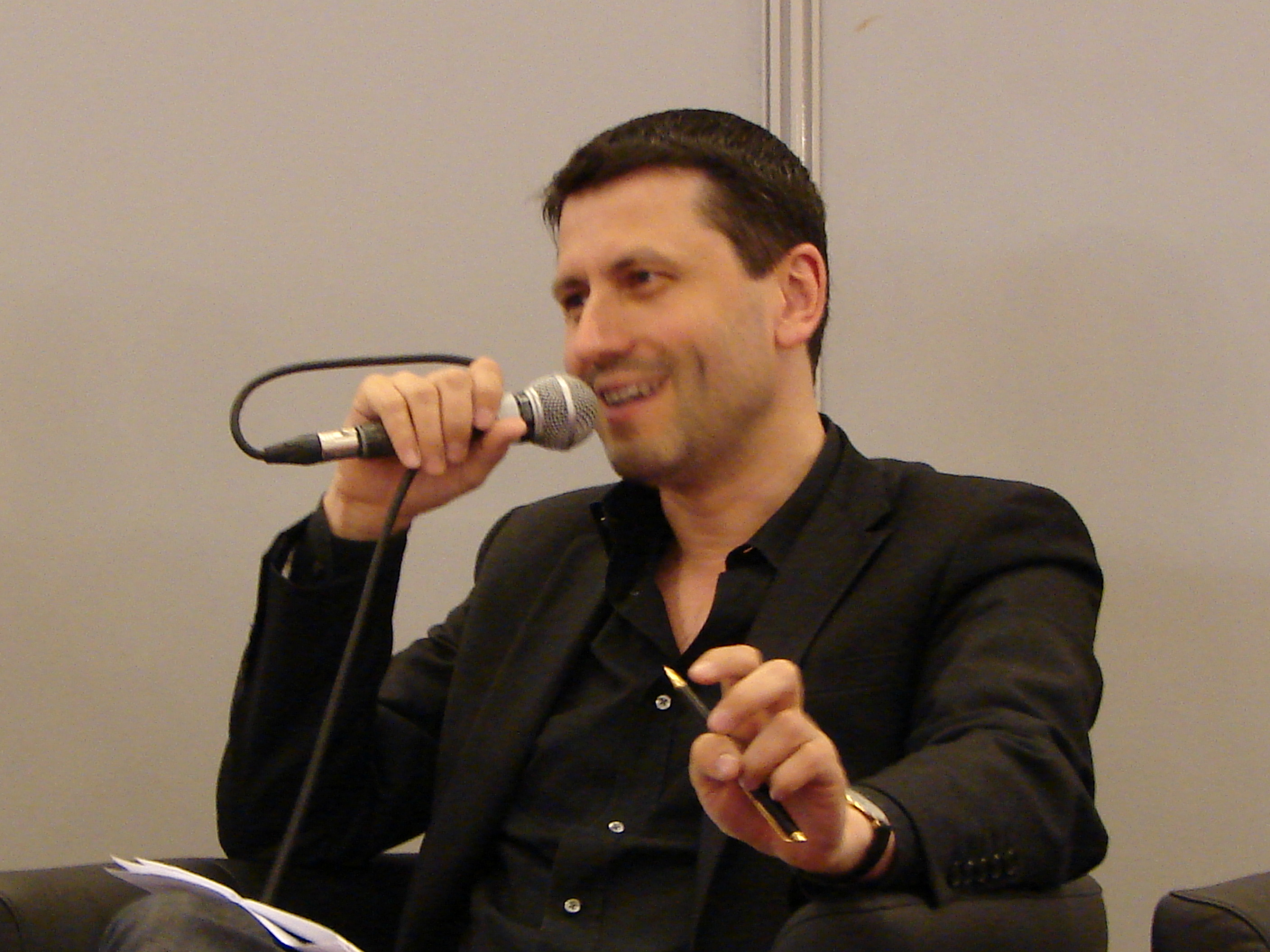
- Martel in 2010
- Born: 28 October 1967 (age 58); Châteaurenard, France
- Occupations: Writer and journalist
- Writing career
- Notable works: The Pink and the Black, Homosexuals in France since 1968 (1996); Mainstream (2010); In the Closet of the Vatican (2019)
- Website: www.fredericmartel.com

Frédéric Martel (born 28 October 1967) is a French writer, researcher and journalist. His most famous books are The Pink and the Black, Homosexuals in France since 1968 (1996), Mainstream (2010) and In the Closet of the Vatican (2019), a New York Times bestseller.

== Biography ==
Frédéric Martel holds a PhD in social sciences and four graduate degrees, in philosophy (University of Sorbonne, Paris I), social science (Sorbonne, Paris I), political science (Panthéon, Paris II) and public law (Panthéon, Paris II). He was the head of the book office at the French Embassy in Romania (1990–1992) and a "chargé de mission" at the French ministry of culture (1992). After being advisor to the former Socialist Party Prime Minister Michel Rocard (1993–1994), he served the Minister of Labor and Social Affairs Martine Aubry, as her speech writer (1997–2000). From 2001 to 2005, he was "cultural attaché" at the French embassy in the US. He has also been a visiting scholar at Harvard University and New York University (2004–2006).

== Books ==
His most famous books are The Pink and the Black, Homosexuals in France since 1968 (1996 – trans. into English at Stanford University Press), Mainstream (on global culture – 2010), "Smart" (on the "internets" – 2014) and De la culture en Amérique, a book about cultural policies and industries in the United States, which was featured on the cover of the New York Times art section in 2006. NYT's journalist Alan Riding wrote : "In Culture in America, a 622-page tome weighty with information, Martel challenges the conventional view in France that (French) culture financed and organized by the government is entirely good and that (American) culture shaped by market forces is necessarily bad".

On February 21, 2019, Martel published Sodoma (trans. into English by Bloomsbury under the title In the Closet of the Vatican). Published simultaneously in eight languages In the Closet of the Vatican has been an instant best-seller. Based on testimony by 41 cardinals, 52 bishops, 45 nuncios and ambassadors and hundreds of priests, the book suggests that a large majority of priests and bishops in the Vatican, including those who make the most homophobic and traditional speeches about morality, are homosexuals, practicing or not. "The Corruption of the Vatican’s Gay Elite Has Been Exposed" wrote, in a long piece for The Atlantic, Andrew Sullivan. The book was praised by Colm Tóibín, the former head of Dominicans order Timothy Radcliffe, and the British historian Sir Diarmaid MacCulloch.

Martel wrote, or currently writes, for numerous publications in France and elsewhere (including Magazine Littéraire, L'Express, Le Point, Le Monde, Dissent, The Nation, Haaretz and Slate) and produces its own radio show, "Soft Power", a weekly live talk show on the entertainment, the medias and "the internets" for the French national public radio station France Culture (Radio France).

Additionally, he has had high-level academic activities by giving conferences in major American universities (such as Harvard, Stanford, Yale, Princeton, Berkeley and the MIT), universities in Mexico, Argentina, Brazil, Hong Kong, China, Japan, India, Egypt (and dozens others countries) and by teaching, from 2005 to 2014, at the Institut d'Études Politiques de Paris (also known as Sciences Po Paris) and at the Ecole des Hautes Etudes Commerciales de Paris (also known as HEC Paris). In 2008–2010, he was a researcher for the French Foreign Affairs' Analysis and Forecasting Centre and he founded the research web site of the Institut National de l'Audiovisuel regarding creative industries and medias around the world.

In January 2020 he was elected a professor (tenure professor on creative economies) at Zurich University of the Arts (Switzerland). He was then appointed head of research of the Zurich Centre for Creative Economies.

== Main publications ==
Frédéric Martel is the author of twelve books:

- Philosophie du droit et philosophie politique, LGDJ, 1995 (his thesis in public law published as a book at LGDJ Press)
- Le rose et le noir: Les homosexuels en France depuis 1968, Le Seuil, 1996; English translation: The pink and the black: Homosexuals in France since 1968, trans. Jane Marie Todd, Stanford University Press, 2000, ISBN 978-0-8047-3274-1
- La longue marche des gays, coll. "Découvertes Gallimard" (n° 417), série Culture et société, Éditions Gallimard, 2002
- Theater, Sur le déclin du théâtre en Amérique et comment il peut résister en France, La Découverte, 2006
- De la culture en Amérique (Culture in America), Gallimard, 2006 (2007 France-Amériques prize; trans. into in Japanese and in Polish)
- Mainstream, Enquête sur la guerre globale de la culture et des médias (On Global War on Culture), Flammarion, 2010 (trans. into a dozen languages & countries: Germany, Japan, China, Spain, Poland, Mexico, South Korea, Brazil, Italy etc.)
- J'aime pas le sarkozysme culturel (Against Sarkozy's Culture), Flammarion, 2012
- Global gay: Comment la révolution gay change le monde, Flammarion, 2013; English translation: Global gay: How gay culture is changing the world, MIT Press, 2019
- Smart: Ces internets qui nous rendent intelligents, Flammarion, 2015; English translation: Smart: The digital century, HarperCollins, 2018
- Sodoma: Enquête au cœur du Vatican, Éditions Robert Laffont, 2019; English translation: In the Closet of the Vatican: Power, Homosexuality, Hypocrisy, Bloomsbury, 2019, ISBN 9781472966148
- Occidents, Enquête sur nos ennemis, Plon Publisher, 2026.

== Film and TV documentaries ==
Yves Jeuland's movie Bleu, Blanc, Rose was based on Frédéric Martel's The Pink and the Black (broad. on France 3, National Public Television) and Frédéric Martel has also codirected the documentary De la culture en Amérique with Frédéric Laffont (broad. on Arte, French-German TV network) and Global Gay with Rémi Lainé (2014). The Global Gay documentary received the "Grand Prix" by the World Organization Against Torture, OMCT, in Geneva, 2014.

== Distinctions ==
- Chevalier dans l'ordre des Arts et des Lettres (the most important French decoration in the field of arts, culture and literature).
- Digital Shapers 2020 (the main Swiss prize for the Internet (awarded by Bilanz, Le Temps and Handelszeitung).
