= 1946: The Mistranslation That Shifted Culture =

2022 documentary film about Bible mistranslation

- Directed by: Sharon Roggio
- Written by: Jena Serbu; Jill Woodward
- Produced by: Sharon Roggio; Jena Serbu
- Starring: Kathy Baldock; Ed Oxford
- Cinematography: Tyler Eichorst; Collier Landry; Samuel Emerson Morgan
- Edited by: Jill Woodward
- Music by: Mary Lambert
- Production companies: ACOWSAY; Quest for Biblical Truth; Sweetbreadstudios; ZUM Communications
- Distributed by: ACOWSAY
- Release date: 2022
- Running time: 92 minutes
- Country: United States

1946: The Mistranslation That Shifted Culture is a 2022 documentary film about the translation of two Koine Greek words in the New Testament—arsenokoitai and malakoi—during the creation of the Revised Standard Version of the Christian Bible in 1946, and how it has contributed to anti-LGBT rhetoric.

== Summary ==
Following two Christian researchers, Kathy Baldock and Ed Oxford, the documentary's premise is that the Christian Bible was allegedly mistranslated in 1946, misaligning religious and cultural perceptions of LGBTQ people in the United States and anti-LGBT rhetoric around the world.

In 1946, the National Council of Churches brought together biblical scholars and prominent institutions (including Yale Divinity School) to modernize the Bible for contemporary readers. The film argues that for the creation of this Revised Standard Version (RSV), two rare Koine Greek words—arsenokoitai and malakoi, which the researchers believe refer to abusive behaviors and exploitative relationships respectively—were allegedly mistranslated to encompass consenting same-sex relationships, in 1 Corinthians 6:9 and 1 Timothy 1:10. The word homosexual is alleged to have been used to reflect contemporary biases instead of history or linguistics. It was the first time it appeared in any translation of the Bible.

The film contains interviews with biblical scholars, linguists, religious leaders, theologians, and David Fearon: a man who had challenged the translation as a seminary student in 1959, but was told by scholars then that while it was possibly inaccurate, "the damage had already been done." The RSV became widely adopted across the United States, influencing culture, public policy, and theology. Further translations, such as the 1970s' New International Version, kept using homosexual, with "damning effect".

== Production ==
Filmmaker Sharon "Rocky" Roggio was a lesbian Christian. Her father was a pastor whose belief in biblical literalism led him to estrange his daughter from her family when she was forceably outed. She met Baldock at a Hollywood United Methodist Church seminar where she learned of their research into the RSV translation of arsenokoitai and malakoi, and met Fearon. Roggio was inspired to make 1946 to "encourage more conversation and help stop the weaponization of God and scripture and free the LGBTQ+ community from religious oppression." Roggio's father features prominently in the film.

The 92-minute, crowdfunded, documentary film was produced in the United States and directed by Roggio. She and Jena Serbu produced the film, with Serbu and Jill Woodward serving as screenwriters. Mary Lambert composed the original music for the film. Cinematography was done by Tyler Eichorst, Collier Landry, and Samuel Emerson Morgan. Jill Woodward also served as editor.

ACOWSAY, Quest for Biblical Truth, Sweetbreadstudios, and ZUM Communications were the production companies for 1946, while ACOWSAY distributed it.

== Release ==
1946: The Mistranslation That Shifted Culture premiered in 2022 at Doc NYC, where it won the audience award. With over US$150,000 (equivalent to about $159,000 in 2025) raised on GoFundMe, 1946 began a limited theatrical release on December 1, 2023.

== Reception ==
In January 2023, Screen Daily's Nikki Baughan spoke well of 1946, calling it "fascinating" and "thought-provoking" yet "unlikely to alter the beliefs of the conservative religious right." By that December, the film had won 23 festival awards. In mid-2024, while referring to one such in Tacoma, Washington, Roggio told The News Tribune that selling out screenings of 1946 was "typical".

Prior to its premiere, Roggio said that her documentary received significant criticism from conservative media trying to debunk its claims, sometimes without having seen the film.

Prior to the film's release, Alan Shlemon, writing for the Protestant apologetical organisation Stand to Reason, described the film's central claim as "irrelevant", citing other instances in the Old and New Testaments where homosexuality is mentioned in a negative light, as well as stating the film contains fallacies which are "easy to spot".

== Awards and nominations ==
Award	Date of ceremony	Recipients	Result
Cleveland International Film Festival	2023	Dream Maker	Won
Cleveland International Film Festival	2023	Roxanne T. Mueller Audience Choice Award for Best Film	Won
Palm Springs International Film Festival	2023	Best of Fest	Won
Outfest	2023	Best Documentary Feature	Won
Out on Film	2023	Best Documentary	Won
Doc NYC	2022	Audience Award	Won
