= The Bible and homosexuality =

Several passages in the Hebrew Bible and the New Testament have been interpreted as addressing same-sex sexual activity and relationships. Traditionally understood as prohibitions against homosexuality, these texts have played a central role in shaping Jewish and Christian teachings on sexuality and have been used to reinforce heterosexual marriage as the normative ideal.

The passages understood to be about homosexual individuals and sexual relations in the Hebrew Bible are found primarily in the Torah (the first five books traditionally attributed to Moses). Leviticus 18:22 and 20:13 are traditionally interpreted as explicitly forbidding of male same-sex intercourse; some scholars argue these verses may instead prohibit incest or have been mistranslated. The story of Sodom and Gomorrah has historically been linked to homosexuality, though Jewish prophets and later rabbinic tradition emphasized social injustice and inhospitality as the true sins of Sodom. Debates also surround the relationships of David and Jonathan and Ruth and Naomi, with some suggesting homoerotic or lesbian readings, though mainstream scholarship rejects these.

In the New Testament, Romans 1:26–27, 1 Corinthians 6:9–11, and 1 Timothy 1:8–11 contain disputed Greek terms (arsenokoitai, malakoi) often interpreted as condemning homosexual acts, though alternative views suggest they may reference pederasty, exploitation, or general sexual immorality rather than orientation. Jesus himself never explicitly addressed homosexuality; passages on marriage (Matthew 19, Mark 10) are taken by some to affirm heterosexuality, while others argue they were situational responses, not definitions of marriage. References to eunuchs (Matthew 19:12, Acts 8) have been interpreted by some modern commentators as early biblical recognition of homosexual or non-heteronormative identities, though this remains contested.

== Hebrew Bible ==
There are a number of passages in the Hebrew Bible that have been interpreted as involving same-sex sexual acts, desires, and relationships. The passages about homosexual individuals and sexual relations in the Hebrew Bible are found primarily in the Torah (the first five books traditionally attributed to Moses) and have been interpreted as referring primarily to male homosexual individuals and sexual practices.

The Hebrew Bible/Old Testament and its traditional interpretations in Judaism and Christianity have historically affirmed and endorsed a heteronormative approach towards human sexuality, favouring exclusively penetrative vaginal intercourse between men and women within the boundaries of marriage over all other forms of human sexual activity, including autoeroticism, masturbation, oral sex, non-penetrative and non-heterosexual sexual intercourse (of which the penetrative forms have been labelled as "sodomy" by some), believing and teaching that such behaviors are forbidden because they are considered to be sinful, and further compared to or derived from the behaviour of the alleged residents of Sodom and Gomorrah.

=== Leviticus 18 and 20 ===
Chapters 18 and 20 of Leviticus form part of the Holiness code and list prohibited forms of intercourse, including the following verses:

- "You shall not lie with a male as with a woman; it is an abomination." Chapter 18 verse 22
- "If a man lies with a male as with a woman, both of them have committed an abomination; they shall be put to death; their blood is upon them." Chapter 20 verse 13

It is widely argued that the things condemned in these verses are "deemed wrong not simply because pagan Canaanites indulged in them, but because God has pronounced them wrong as such." (Hilborn 2002, p. 4; cf. Issues in human sexuality, para. 2.11; Amsel). This was also the interpretation taken in the rabbinic interpretations in the Mishnah and Talmud, which also extended this to include female homosexual relations, although there are no explicit references in the Hebrew Bible to this.

Various counter-arguments have been suggested: Loren L. Johns writes that these texts were purity codes to keep Israel separate from the Canaanites and that as Jesus rejected the whole purity code they are no longer relevant. Mona West argues that "These verses in no way prohibit, nor do they even speak, to loving, caring sexual relationships between people of the same gender", speculating that these laws were to prevent sexual abuse.

Other Christian theologians hold that the New Testament classifies ceremonial and dietary laws as typological in nature and fulfilled in Christ (Galatians 4:10; Colossians 2:16; Hebrews 9:10), and thus abrogated as to their religious observance "according to the letter," while the moral law is seen as upheld. (Romans 13:9; 1 Corinthians 6:9–10) Such theologians have said that this abrogation does not extend to homosexuality, which remains in their interpretation as one of the few sins unconditionally condemned. They believe there is no evident provision of marriage being given in the Bible to sanctify it.

More recent interpretations focus on the passage's context as part of the Holiness code, a code of purity meant to distinguish the behavior of the Israelites from the polytheistic Canaanites. Donald J. Wold argues that ancient Israel viewed the Canaanites as "practitioners of homosexuality, rape and incest". They also condemned homosexuality as defying the "male–female model of sexual union" and the holiness of God's sanctuary.

Analyses by Saul Olyan, Professor of Religious Studies and Director of the Judaic Studies Program at Brown University, K. Renato Lings, and others focus on ambiguities embedded in the original Hebrew, arguing these ambiguities may not prohibit all erotic expression between men but rather proscribe incest between male family members. They argue English translators of Leviticus added to the original text to compensate for perceived lacunae in the biblical text; but thereby altered the verse's meaning. Leviticus 18:22 reads:

w'eth-zäkhār lö' tiškav miškevē 'iššâ

Translation:

And with a male you shall not lie the lying downs of a woman. (Note: formal equivalence, offered by Olyan)

Lings argues the inclusion of prepositions not in the original text and the translation of Leviticus' otherwise unattested miškevē within the context of Genesis (i.e., miškevē is found only within Leviticus 18:22 and 20:13, and Genesis 49:4) is crucial to illuminate the incestuous connotation of the passage, and the translation of miškevē in light of Genesis results in the text of Leviticus 18 and 20 becoming more cohesive.

Some authors suggest that the prohibitions in Leviticus 18 and 20 specifically condemn males penetrating other males, thus "emasculating" the latter (anal sex). This makes the prohibitions more akin to a sodomy law.

=== Sodom and Gomorrah ===
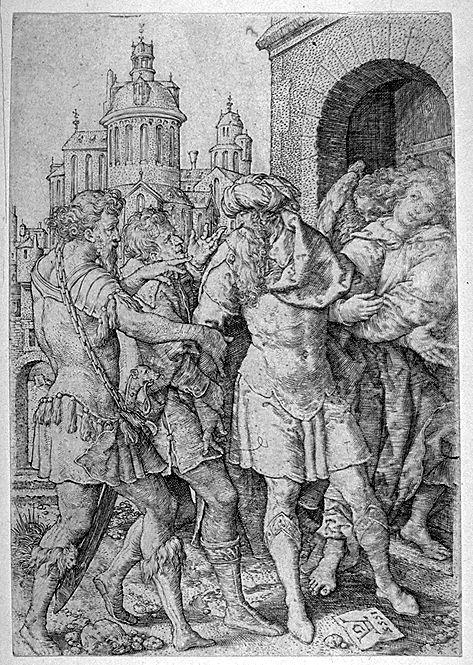
Lot prevents Sodomites from raping the angels, by Heinrich Aldegrever, 1555

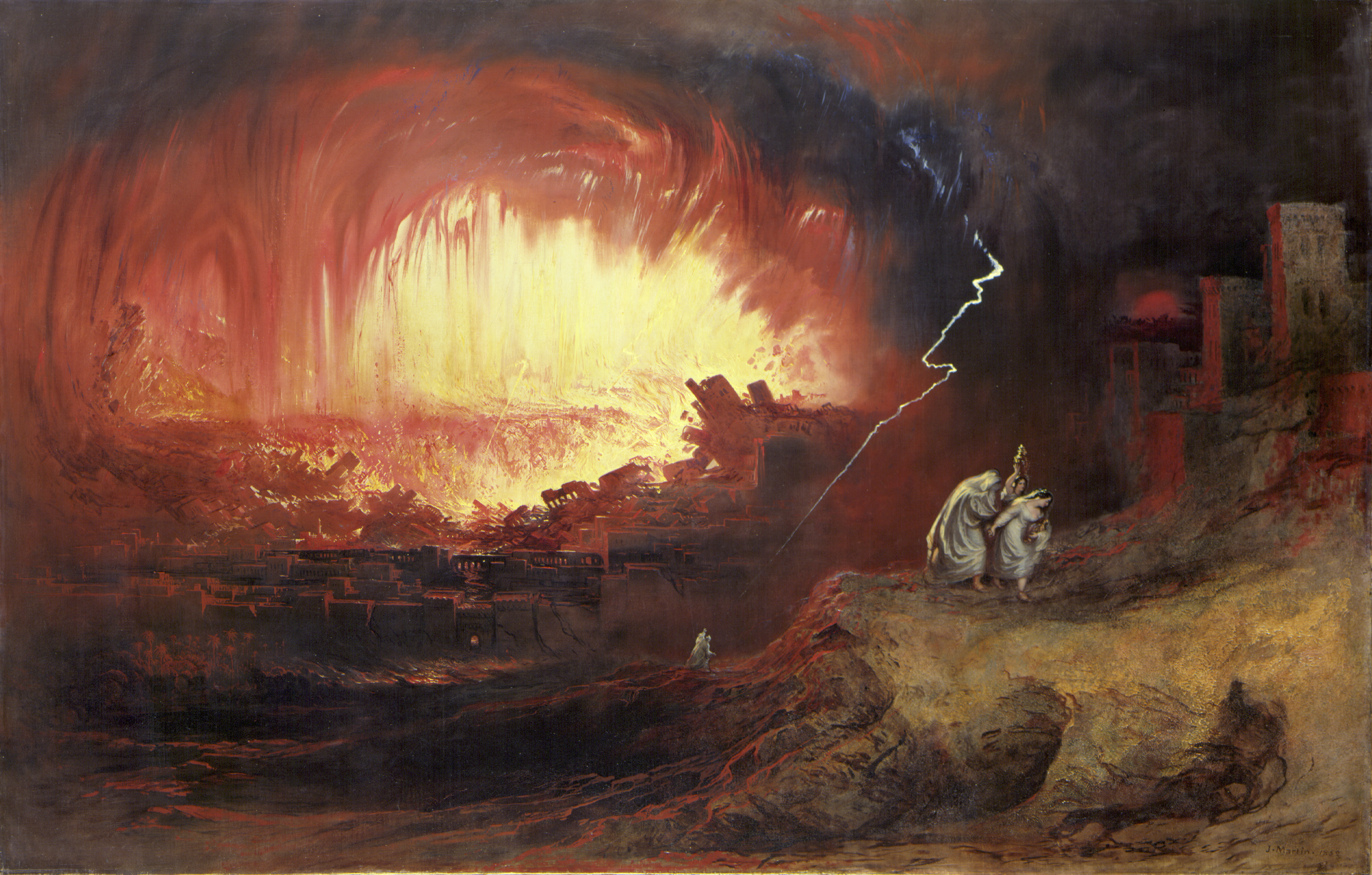
The Destruction of Sodom and Gomorrah, John Martin, 1852

The story of the destruction of Sodom and Gomorrah in Genesis does not explicitly identify homosexuality as the sin for which they were destroyed. Some interpreters find the story of Sodom and a similar one in Judges 19 to condemn the rape of guests more than homosexuality, but the passage has historically been interpreted within Judaism and Christianity as a punishment for homosexuality due to the interpretation that the men of Sodom wished to rape, or have sex with, the angels who retrieved Lot.

While the Jewish prophets spoke only of lack of charity as the sin of Sodom, the exclusively sexual interpretation became so prevalent among Christian communities that the name "Sodom" became the basis of the word sodomy, still a legal synonym for homosexual and non-procreative sexual acts, particularly anal or oral sex.

While the Jewish prophets Isaiah, Jeremiah, Amos and Zephaniah refer vaguely to the sin of Sodom, Ezekiel specifies that the city was destroyed because of its commission of social injustice as well as its commission of "abomination:"

Behold, this was the iniquity of thy sister Sodom, pride, fullness of bread, and abundance of idleness was in her and in her daughters, neither did she strengthen the hand of the poor and needy. And they were haughty, and committed abomination before me: therefore I took them away as I saw good.

The Talmudic tradition as written between c. 370–500 also interprets the sin of Sodom as lack of charity, with the attempted rape of the angels being a manifestation of the city's violation of the social order of hospitality.

Later traditions on Sodom's sin, such as Testaments of the Twelve Patriarchs, considered it to be an illicit form of heterosexual intercourse. In Jude 1:7–8 the Bible says of Sodom and Gomorrah:

Even as Sodom and Gomorrha, and the cities about them in like manner, giving themselves over to fornication, and going after strange flesh, are set forth an example, suffering the vengeance of eternal fire. Likewise also these filthy dreamers defile the flesh..."

This has been interpreted as a reference to homosexuality by some and to the sexual lust of mortals after angels by others. Jewish writers Philo (d. AD 50) and Josephus (37 –c. 100) were the first reported individuals to assert unambiguously that homosexuality was among the sins of Sodom. By the end of the 1st century AD, Jews commonly identified the sin of Sodom with homosexual practices.

==== Yada ====
In Genesis 19:5 the Hebrew word "yada" is translated "relations" in the New American Standard Bible and most often "know" in the KJV and many other translations, occurs frequently in the Old Testament, and usually simply means to know someone or something in a non-sexual way. About a dozen times it is used as a euphemism for knowing someone sexually, as in Genesis 4:1, and Genesis 38:26. The common interpretation is that Lot offered his virgin daughters to the crowd as a means to sexually appease the crowd and protect his visitors from being raped. Most traditional commentators interpret this to refer to the homosexual nature of the people in the crowd, especially in the light of the parallel story in Judges 19. However, others see it as referring to Sodom's inhospitable attitude in seeking to interrogate the visitors.

==== Jewish views ====
Most Jewish views regard the sins of Sodom to be "failing to practice hospitality", and even though same-sex activities are condemned most harshly in Leviticus, the opinion that Genesis 19 might refer to any other sexual act other than with Lot's daughters is alien to most ancient Jewish tradition. See documentation at Sodomy.

Conversely, the Hellenistic Jewish philosopher Philo (20 BC – 50 AD) described the inhabitants of Sodom in an extra-biblical account:

As men, being unable to bear discreetly a satiety of these things, get restive like cattle, and become stiff-necked, and discard the laws of nature, pursuing a great and intemperate indulgence of gluttony, and drinking, and unlawful connections; for not only did they go mad after other women, and defile the marriage bed of others, but also those who were men lusted after one another, doing unseemly things, and not regarding or respecting their common nature, and though eager for children, they were convicted by having only an abortive offspring; but the conviction produced no advantage, since they were overcome by violent desire; and so by degrees, the men became accustomed to be treated like women, and in this way engendered among themselves the disease of females, and intolerable evil; for they not only, as to effeminacy and delicacy, became like women in their persons, but they also made their souls most ignoble, corrupting in this way the whole race of men, as far as depended on them. (133-35; ET Jonge 422-23).

Additionally, the Jewish historian Josephus (AD 37 – c. 100) used the term “Sodomites” in summarizing the Genesis narrative:

About this time the Sodomites grew proud, on account of their riches and great wealth; they became unjust towards men, and impious towards God, in so much that they did not call to mind the advantages they received from him: they hated strangers, and abused themselves with Sodomitical practices” "Now when the Sodomites saw the young men to be of beautiful countenances, and this to an extraordinary degree, and that they took up their lodgings with Lot, they resolved themselves to enjoy these beautiful boys by force and violence; and when Lot exhorted them to sobriety, and not to offer any thing immodest to the strangers, but to have regard to their lodging in his house; and promised that if their inclinations could not be governed, he would expose his daughters to their lust, instead of these strangers; neither thus were they made ashamed. (Antiquities 1.11.1,3) — c. AD 96)

The Book of the Secrets of Enoch, evidently written by a Hellenistic Jew in Egypt before the middle of the 1st century, states (10:3) that the Sodomites committed "abominable lecheries, namely one with another" and "the sin against nature, which is child-corruption after the Sodomitic fashion, magic-making, enchantments and devilish witchcraft."

More obscure sources include the Testament of Benjamin, which warned, "that ye shall commit fornication with the fornication of Sodom", (Concerning a Pure Mind, 9:1) and references in the Testament of Naphtal, (3.5) and the Testament of Isaac. (5.27. Ch. I.909)

==== Byzantine period ====
It is argued that the story of Sodom and Gomorrah had never been interpreted as relating to one single particular sin, until Byzantine emperor Justinian the Great instituted two law novelizations, in the 6th century. Regarding the Corpus iuris civilis, Justinian's novels no. 77 (dating 538) and no. 141 (dating 559) were the first to declare that Sodom's sin had been specifically same-sex activities. Regarding the death penalty, Justinian's legal novels heralded a change in the Roman legal paradigm by introducing the concept of secular punishment for homosexual behavior. Individuals might escape mundane laws, however divine laws were inescapable.

Justinian's interpretation of the story of Sodom would be forgotten today (as it had been along with his law novelizations regarding homosexual behavior immediately after his death) had it not been made use of in fake Charlemagnian capitularies, fabricated by a Frankish monk using the pseudonym Benedictus Levita ("Benedict the Levite") around 850 CE, as part of the Pseudo-Isidore where Benedictus utilized Justinian's interpretation as a justification for ecclesiastical supremacy over mundane institutions, thereby demanding burning at the stake for carnal sins in the name of Charlemagne himself (burning had been part of the standard penalty for homosexual behavior particularly common in Germanic antiquity, note that Benedictus most probably was Frankish), especially homosexuality, for the first time in ecclesiastical history in order to protect all Christianity from divine punishments such as natural disasters for carnal sins committed by individuals, but also for heresy, superstition and heathenry. According to Benedictus, this was why all mundane institutions had to be subjected to ecclesiastical power in order to prevent moral as well as religious laxity causing divine wrath.

During the Roman Republic and pre-Christian Roman Empire, homosexual behavior had been acceptable as long as the adult male citizen took the penetrative role with a passive partner of lower social status. Laws regulating homosexuality were directed primarily at protecting underage male citizens. Those who committed a sex crime (stuprum) against a freeborn male minor were penalized by death or a fine, depending on the circumstances. Letters written to Cicero suggest that the law was used primarily to harass political opponents, and may have been applied also to citizens who willingly took the passive role in sex acts (see Sexuality in ancient Rome and Lex Scantinia).

=== David and Jonathan ===
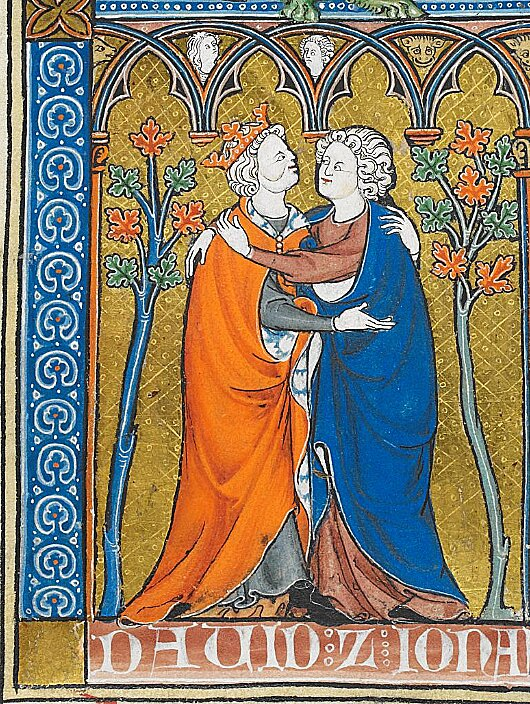
David and Jonathan, "La Somme le Roy", 1290; French illuminated ms (detail); British Museum

The account of the friendship between David and Jonathan was recorded favourably in the Books of Samuel (1 Samuel 18; 20; 2 Samuel 1) and although most scholars have always interpreted it as referring to platonic love, some have argued that it refers to romantic or sexual love. Theologian Theodore Jennings identifies the story as one of desire for David by both Saul and Jonathan, stating, "Saul's jealousy has driven [David] into Jonathan's arms." Michael Coogan, lecturer on the Old Testament at Harvard Divinity School, addresses the claim of the alleged homosexual relationship between David and Jonathan and explicitly rejects it.

==== As romantic relationship ====
Jonathan's gifts to David, David's comparison of Jonathan's love to the love of women, the "covenant" the two made, and Saul's reaction have led some scholars to suggest that their relationship was a romantic or possibly sexual one.

==== As platonic relationship ====
Biblical scholars have widely and traditionally interpreted this as a very close but non-sexual relationship (cf. Issues in human sexuality, para. 2.17). Some opponents of the theory that David and Jonathan's relationship was romantic believe that the stripping of Jonathan has a clear Biblical precedent, that of the stripping of Aaron of his garments to put them upon Eleazar his son (Numbers 20:26) in transference of the office of the former upon the latter; in like manner, Jonathan would be symbolically and prophetically transferring the kingship of himself (as the normal heir) to David, which would come to pass. They also say that "stripped himself...even to his sword, and to his bow, and to his girdle" indicates a limit, that of his outer garments and ending with “girdle, which means armor in 2Kings 3:21.

Those who assert the opposing interpretation agree that a sexual relationship is not made explicit, and for many scholars the relationship is a "classical Biblical example" (Hilborn 2002, p. 2) of close non-sexual friendship, such as the friendship eloquently described by Gregory of Nazianzus in Oration 43, 19–20 as existing between him and Basil of Caesarea, when they were students in Athens.

=== Ruth and Naomi ===
The Book of Ruth concerns the love between Naomi and her widowed daughter-in-law, Ruth. Naomi's husband and her two sons die and Naomi tells her daughters-in-law to return to their homes:

At this they wept aloud again. Then Orpah kissed her mother-in-law good-bye, but Ruth clung to her.

(Ruth 1:14; TNIV).

Instead of leaving Naomi, Ruth pledges to stay with her (Ruth 1:16–18). This relationship has therefore long been commended as an example of self-sacrificing love and close friendship (e.g. Issues in Human Sexuality para. 2.7). However, some have interpreted this relationship as probably sexual in nature. For example, Thomas Horner argues: "Whether there existed a relationship of physical love between Ruth and Naomi cannot be demonstrated. However, the right words are there." The word Horner is primarily concerned with is the word translated as clung in Ruth 1:14, which is the Hebrew word "dabaq". This word is also translated in Genesis 2:24 as united "to his wife" and in Genesis 34:3 as drawn "to Dinah daughter of Jacob; he loved the young woman". The context of these passages is one of romantic or sexual attraction.

Text from the Book of Ruth, specifically Ruth's "whither thou goest, I will go" speech to Naomi, is used in Jewish heterosexual wedding ceremonies.

The story of Ruth and Naomi is also occasionally interpreted by contemporary scholars as the story of a lesbian couple. Coogan states that the Hebrew Bible does not even mention lesbianism.

=== Books of Kings ===
Both Books of Kings (1 Kings 14:24, 15:12, 22:46; 2 Kings 23:7), refer to historical intervals when kadeshim ("consecrated ones") rose to some prominence in the Holy Land, until purged by Yahwist revivalist kings such as Jehoshaphat and Josiah.

The kadeshim were connected in some way with the rituals of the Canaanite religion. The Hebrew Bible consistently parallels the female equivalent, a kedeshah, with zanah, the word for a common prostitute. This has led to the inference that there may have been a sexual element to the rituals. The King James version systematically translates the word as "sodomites", while the Revised Standard version renders it, "male cult prostitutes". At 1 Kings 15:12 the Septuagint hellenises them as teletai – personifications of the presiding spirits at the initiation rites of the Bacchic orgies. There may have been a transvestite element, too. Various classical authors assert this of male initiates of Eastern goddess cults, and in the Vulgate for all four of these references St. Jerome renders the kadeshim as "effeminati". The sons of Israel are forbidden from becoming kadeshim and the daughters of Israel from becoming kadeshot; in Deuteronomy 23:17–18 the activities of these cultic figures are identified as "abominations".

== New Testament ==
=== Romans 1:26–27 ===
Romans 1:26–27 is commonly cited as one instance of New Testament teaching against homosexuality:

For this reason God gave them up to degrading passions. Their women exchanged natural intercourse for unnatural, and in the same way also the men, giving up natural intercourse with women, were consumed with passion for one another. Men committed shameless acts with men and received in their own persons the due penalty for their error.

This passage, part of a larger discourse in 1:18–32, has been debated by contemporary Bible scholars as to its relevance today, what it actually prohibits and whether it represents Paul's view or rhetoric that Paul is actively arguing against. Clement of Alexandria and John Chrysostom regarded it as concerning female and male homosexual intercourse, while Augustine of Hippo viewed it as referring to heterosexual and homosexual anal sex. Although Christians of several denominations have historically maintained that this verse is a complete prohibition of all forms of homosexual activity, some 20th- and 21st-century authors contend the passage is not a blanket condemnation of homosexual acts, suggesting, among other interpretations, that the passage condemned heterosexuals who experimented with homosexual activity or that Paul's condemnation was relative to his own culture, in which homosexuality was not understood as an orientation and in which being penetrated was seen as shameful. These interpretations are, however, in a minority.

Scholars, noting that Romans 1:18–32 represents an exception in the book of Romans as a whole and uses vocabulary elsewhere not seen in Paul's letters, have for decades puzzled over the passage. Some scholars believe these verses are part of a much larger non-Pauline interpolation, a later addition to the letter. Others argue that the grammar of the Greek original demands that Romans 1:18–32 be read as a rhetorical set-up, a summary of Hellenistic Jewish legalist rhetoric that Paul actively forbids followers of Christ from using in Romans 2.

=== 1 Corinthians 6:9–11; 1 Timothy 1:8–11 ===
In the context of the broader immorality of his audience, Paul the Apostle referenced at least some form of homosexual acts in the First Epistle to the Corinthians, chapter 6 verses 9-11, which the New Revised Standard Edition renders as follows:

Do you not know that wrongdoers will not inherit the kingdom of God? Do not be deceived! Fornicators, idolaters, adulterers, male prostitutes, sodomites, thieves, the greedy, drunkards, revilers, robbers—none of these will inherit the kingdom of God. And this is what some of you used to be. But you were washed, you were sanctified, you were justified in the name of the Lord Jesus Christ and in the Spirit of our God.

1 Timothy 1:8–11, as rendered in the same translation, states:

Now we know that the law is good, if one uses it legitimately. This means understanding that the law is laid down not for the innocent but for the lawless and disobedient, for the godless and sinful, for the unholy and profane, for those who kill their father or mother, for murderers, fornicators, sodomites, slave traders, liars, perjurers, and whatever else is contrary to the sound teaching that conforms to the glorious gospel of the blessed God, which he entrusted to me.

In the letter to the Corinthians, within the list of people who will not inherit the kingdom of God, Paul uses two Greek words: malakia (μαλακοὶ), and arsenokoitai (ἀρσενοκοῖται), which the translation renders as 'male prostitutes' and 'sodomites', respectively, though their meaning is debated.

Arsenokoitai is a compound word in Greek. In this case, arsenokoitai is from the Greek words arrhēn/arsēn (ἄῤῥην/ἄρσην) meaning 'male', and koitēn (κοίτην) meaning 'bed', with a sexual connotation. A direct translation would be 'male-bed'. Its first recorded use was by Paul in 1 Corinthians and later in 1 Timothy 1 (attributed to Paul), and remains unattested in contemporaneous sources. Some scholars consider Paul to have adapted this word by translating, to Greek, the verse from Leviticus 20:13, with additional adaption from the wording of the Septuagint translations of Leviticus 18:22 and 20:23. Due to its unclear definition, English translators struggled with representing the concept of arsenokoitai. It has been variously rendered as "sexual perverts" (RSV), "sodomites" (NRSV), "abusers of themselves with mankind" (KJV), "men who have sex with men" (NIV) or "practicing homosexuals" (NET).

Malakia (μαλακία, 'softness', 'weakliness') is an ancient Greek word that, in relation to men, has sometimes been translated as 'effeminacy'. Also translates to "of things subject to touch, "soft" (used in Matthew 11:8 and Luke 7:25 to describe a garment); of things not subject to touch, "gentle"; and, of persons or modes of life, a number of meanings that include "pathic". However, in modern Greek it has come to mean 'masturbation', and its derivative μαλάκας – malakas means 'one who masturbates'.

==== Interpretation ====
Episcopal Bishop Gene Robinson says the early church seemed to have understood it as a person with a "soft" or weak morality; later, it would come to denote (and be translated as) those who engage in masturbation, or "those who abuse themselves"; all that is factually known about the word is that it means "soft".

Most scholars hold that Paul had two passages of the Book of Leviticus – Leviticus 18:22 and Leviticus 20:13 – in mind when he used the word ἀρσενοκοῖται (which may be of his coinage), with most commentators and translators interpreting it as a reference to male same-sex intercourse. However, American historian John Boswell states that it "did not connote homosexuality to Paul or his early readers", and that in later Christian literature the word is used, for instance, by Aristides of Athens (c. 138) clearly not for homosexuality and possibly for prostitution, Eusebius (d. c. 340) who evidently used it in reference to women, and in the writings of 6th-century Patriarch John IV of Constantinople, known as John the Faster. In a passage dealing with sexual misconduct, John speaks of arsenokoitia as active or passive and says that "many men even commit the sin of arsenokoitia with their wives". (Note: Original Greek: "Τὸ μέντοι τῆς ἀρσενοκοιτίας μῦσος πολλοὶ καὶ μετὰ τῶν γυναικῶν αὐτῶν ἐκτελοῦσιν") Although the constituent elements of the compound word refer to sleeping with men, he obviously does not use it to mean homosexual intercourse and appears to employ it for anal intercourse, not generic homosexual activity. Particulars of Boswell's arguments are rejected by several scholars in a way qualified as persuasive "to this nonspecialist" by David F. Greenberg, who declares usage of the term arsenokoites by writers such as Aristides of Athens and Eusebius, and in the Sibylline Oracles, to be "consistent with a homosexual meaning". A discussion document issued by the House of Bishops of the Church of England states that most scholars still hold that the word arsenokoites relates to homosexuality. Another work attributed to John the Faster, a series of canons that for various sins provided shorter though stricter penances in place of the previous longer penances, applies a penance of 80 days for "intercourse of men with one another" (canon 9), explained in the Pedalion as mutual masturbation – double the penalty for solitary masturbation (canon 8) – and three years with xerophagy or, in accordance with the older canon of Basil the Great, 15 without (canon 18) for being "so mad as to copulate with another man" – ἀρρενομανήσαντα in the original – explained in the Pedalion as "guilty of arsenocoetia (i.e., sexual intercourse between males)" – ἀρσενοκοίτην in the original. According to the same work, ordination is not to be conferred on someone who as a boy has been the victim of anal intercourse, but this is not the case if the semen was ejaculated between his thighs (canon 19). These canons are included, with commentary, in the Pedalion, the most widely used collection of canons of the Greek Orthodox Church, an English translation of which was produced by Denver Cummings and published by the Orthodox Christian Educational Society in 1957 under the title The Rudder.

Some scholars consider that the term was not used to refer to a homosexual orientation, but argue that it referred instead to sexual activity.

Other scholars have interpreted arsenokoitai and malakoi (another word that appears in 1 Corinthians 6:9) as referring to weakness and effeminacy or to the practice of exploitative pederasty.

=== Jesus's discussion of marriage ===
In Matthew 19 and parallel in Mark 10, Jesus is asked if a man can divorce his wife. In that context, Jesus replies:

He answered, "Have you not read that the one who made them at the beginning 'made them male and female', and said, 'For this reason a man shall leave his father and mother and be joined to his wife, and the two shall become one flesh'? So they are no longer two, but one flesh. Therefore what God has joined together, let no one separate."

— Matthew 19:4–6 (NRSV)

Theologian Robert A. J. Gagnon argues that Jesus's back-to-back references to Genesis 1 and Genesis 2 show that he "presupposed a two-sex requirement for marriage". On the other hand, Bart Ehrman, Professor of Religious Studies at the University of North Carolina, states of Jesus's references to Genesis 1 and 2, "[Jesus is] not actually defining marriage. He's answering a specific question." Ehrman notes further "And here the conversation is quite easy. In our surviving records Jesus says nothing about same-sex acts or sexual orientation. Nothing. Nada."

=== Matthew 8; Luke 7 ===
In Matthew 8:5–13 and Luke 7:1–10, Jesus heals a centurion's servant who is dying. Daniel A. Helminiak writes that the Greek word pais, used in this account to refer to the servant, was sometimes given a sexual meaning. Donald Wold states that its normal meaning is "boy", "child" or "slave" and its application to a boy lover escapes notice in the standard lexica of Liddell and Scott and Bauer. The Greek-English Lexicon of Liddell and Scott registers three meanings of the word παῖς (pais): a child in relation to descent (son or daughter); a child in relation to age (boy or girl); a slave or servant (male or female). In her detailed study of the episode in Matthew and Luke, Wendy Cotter dismisses as very unlikely the idea that the use of the Greek word pais indicated a sexual relationship between the centurion and the young slave.

Matthew's account has parallels in Luke 7:1–10 and John 4:46–53. There are major differences between John's account and those of the two synoptic writers, but such differences exist also between the two synoptic accounts, with next to nothing of the details in Luke 7:2–6 being present also in Matthew. The Commentary of Craig A. Evans states that the word pais used by Matthew may be that used in the hypothetical source known as Q used by both Matthew and Luke and, since it can mean either son or slave, it became doulos (slave) in Luke and huios (son) in John. Writers who admit John 4:46–53 as a parallel passage generally interpret Matthew's pais as "child" or "boy", while those who exclude it see it as meaning "servant" or "slave".

Theodore W. Jennings Jr. and Tat-Siong Benny Liew write that Roman historical data about patron–client relationships and about same-sex relations among soldiers support the view that the pais in Matthew's account is the centurion's "boy-love", and that the centurion did not want Jesus to enter his house for fear the boy would be enamoured of Jesus instead. D.B. Saddington writes that, while he does not exclude the possibility, the evidence the two put forward supports "neither of these interpretations", with Wendy Cotter saying that they fail to take account of Jewish condemnation of pederasty.

=== Matthew 19:12 ===
In Matthew 19:12, Jesus speaks of eunuchs who were born as such, eunuchs who were made so by others, and eunuchs who choose to live as such for the kingdom of heaven. Jesus's reference to eunuchs who were born as such has been interpreted by some commentators as having to do with homosexual orientation; Clement of Alexandria, for instance, cites in his book "Stromata" (chapter III,1,1) an earlier interpretation from Basilides that some men, from birth, are naturally averse to women and should not marry. Catholic priest John J. McNeill writes, "The first category – those eunuchs who have been so from birth – is the closest description we have in the Bible of what we understand today as homosexual."

=== Acts 8 ===
The Ethiopian eunuch, an early Gentile convert described in Acts 8, has been interpreted by some commentators as an early gay Christian, based on the fact that the word "eunuch" in the Bible was not always used literally (See above). Some religious commentators suggest that the combination of "eunuch" together with the title "court official" indicates a literal eunuch who would have been excluded from the Temple by the restriction in Deuteronomy 23:1.

== See also ==
- Biblical law
- Christianity and homosexuality
- Homosexuality and Judaism
- Homosexuality and religion
- Homosexuality in ancient Greece
- Malakia
- Sexuality of Jesus
- Women in Christianity
