= Mutwalibu Mugolofa =

Ugandan footballer

Mutwalibi Mugolofa
Personal information
- Full name: Mutwalibi Mugolofa
- Date of birth: November 2, 2000 (age 26)
- Height: 1.80 m (5 ft 11 in)
- Position: Goalkeeper

Team information
- Current team: (Uganda) KCCA FC

Youth career
- Vipers Junior Team
- Kyetume FC
- Mbarara City FC
- Jinja North United FC

Senior career*
Years	Team	Apps	(Gls)
2024–	KCCA FC	13	

International career^{‡}
2024–	Uganda		
- * Club domestic league appearances and goals as of 26 August 2025 ‡ National team caps and goals as of 26 August 2025

Mutwalibi Mugolofa (born 2 November 2000) is a Ugandan professional footballer who plays as a goalkeeper for KCCA FC in the Uganda Premier League.

== Early life ==
Mugolofa began his football career in the FUFA Juniors League. He progressed through the youth systems of several Ugandan clubs, including the Vipers Junior Team, Kyetume FC, Mbarara City FC, and Jinja North United FC.

== Club career ==
=== KCCA FC ===
In January 2024, Mugolofa joined Kampala Capital City Authority FC on a short-term deal from Jinja North United FC. He was a fourth-choice goalkeeper for the club, he impressed with clean sheets in his early appearances and was rewarded with a new two-year contract extension in June 2024, keeping him at the club until 2027.

In the 2024–25 Uganda Premier League season, Mugolofa became KCCA’s first-choice goalkeeper. He recorded six clean sheets in his first seven matches, conceding only once. Overall, in his first 13 games, he managed 10 clean sheets and conceded three goals.

Notable matches included a league encounter with Vipers SC in February 2025, where he made some key important saves though the match ended in their defeat, and a match against URA FC in April 2025.

== International career ==
In 2024, he earned his first call-up to the Uganda national football team.

In November 2024, Mugolofa was summoned to the Uganda national football team for the 2025 Africa Cup of Nations qualifiers against South Africa and Congo, marking his maiden senior call-up.

== Style of play ==
Mugolofa is noted for his agility, quick reflexes, and ability to command the penalty area. His early record at KCCA FC, 10 clean sheets in 13 matches has earned him a reputation as a reliable shot-stopper. Coaches and pundits have also praised his composure under pressure and ball distribution skills.

== Career statistics ==
- Club

Season	Club	League	Apps	Clean sheets	Goals conceded
2023–24	KCCA FC	Uganda Premier League	4	2	
2024–25	KCCA FC	Uganda Premier League	9	8	3
Total			13	10	3

== Honours ==
KCCA FC

- CECAFA Kagame Cup: Runner-up, 2024

== See also ==
- Allan Okello
- Joel Mutakubwa
- Denis Onyango
