= Malakos =

Malakos. It may refer to

- Malakas, a Greek slang word for effeminacy, derived from Malakia, the Ancient Greek: μαλακός (soft)
- Malacology, the study of the invertebrate phylum “Mollusca
- Malakas, the first man in Philippine mythology
- Malkauns, a raga in Indian classical music

== See also ==
- Malacus (disambiguation)
