= Malacus =

Malacus (Greek: Μάλακος) may refer to:

- Malacus of Macedonia, winner in the 329 BC Dolichos (race) (Olympic race)
- Astragalus malacus, a species of Astragalus plant
- Malacus (historian), author of a local history of the island of Sifnos.

== See also ==
- Malakos (disambiguation)
