= Sarah Ruden =

American poet and author (born 1962)

- Education: University of Michigan B.A. Johns Hopkins Writing Seminars, M.A. Harvard University, Ph.D. (Classical Philology)
- Awards: 1996 Central News Agency Literary Award for book of poems, Other Places
- Website: SarahRuden.com

Sarah Elizabeth Ruden is an American writer, classics scholar, and translator. She is a visiting scholar at the University of Pennsylvania. She has been described as 'One of our leading interpreters of ancient literature'. Her publications include poetry, essays, and popularizations of Biblical philology, religious criticism and interpretation.

== Early life and education ==
Sarah Ruden was born in Ohio in 1962 and raised in the United Methodist Church. She holds an M.A. from the Johns Hopkins Writing Seminars and a Ph.D. in Classical Philology from Harvard University. Her doctoral thesis was Toward a typology of humor in the Satyricon of Petronius, and was awarded in 1993.

== Career ==
In addition to her academic appointments, Ruden has worked as a medical editor, a contributor to American periodicals, and a stringer for the South African investigative magazine Noseweek.

Ruden became an activist Quaker during her ten years spent in post-apartheid South Africa, where she was a tutor for the South African Education and Environment Project. Both before and after her return to the United States in 2005, Ruden has engaged in ecumenical outreach and published a number of articles and essays, in both liberal and conservative publications.

In 2008, Ruden became the first woman to publish a full translation of the Aeneid into English. She was a lecturer in Classics at the University of Cape Town. In 2016, she was awarded a Whiting Creative Nonfiction Grant to complete her translation of The Confessions of Augustine (2017).

Ruden is an advocate for the popularization of ancient texts. She has been a visiting scholar at the University of Pennsylvania since 2018.

== Awards ==
In 2010, Ruden was awarded a Guggenheim Fellowship to fund her translation of the Oresteia of Aeschylus. She won a Whiting Creative Nonfiction Grant to complete her translation of The Confessions of Augustine in 2016. Her translation of the Gospels was funded in part by a Robert B. Silvers Grant for Work in Progress in 2019.

== Personal life ==
Ruden has been a “convinced Friend,” or Quaker convert, since 1992. Her Quakerism informs her translation methodology.

== Selected publications ==
=== Books ===
- Reproductive Wrongs: A Short History of Bad Ideas About Women (Liveright, 2026)
- Perpetua. The Woman, The Martyr (Yale: Yale University Press, 2025)
- Vergil. The Poet's Life (Yale: Yale University Press, 2023)

=== Poetry ===
- I Am the Arrow. The Life & Art of Sylvia Plath in Six Poems (Library of America, 2025)
- Other Places. William Waterman Publications. 1995. (Awarded the 1996 Central News Agency Literary Award)

=== Translations ===
- The Gospels. A New Translation (Modern Library, 2023)
- Petronius (2000). The Satyricon of Petronius: A New Translation with Topical Commentaries (trans.). Hackett. ISBN 9780872205109.
- Aristophanes (2003). Aristophanes: Lysistrata, Translated, with Notes and Topical Commentaries (trans.). Hackett.
- Homer (2005). The Homeric Hymns (trans.). Hackett.
- Virgil (2008). The Aeneid: Vergil (trans.). Yale Univ. Press. Revised and expanded (Yale Univ. Press, 2021).
- Apuleius (2012). The Golden Ass (trans.). Yale Univ. Press.
- Aeschylus (2016). The Oresteia, in The Greek Plays (ed. Mary Lefkowitz and James Romm). Modern Library.
- Augustine (2017). Confessions (trans.). Modern Library.
- Plato (2015). Hippias Minor or The Art of Cunning: A new translation of Plato’s most controversial dialogue (trans.). With introduction and artwork by Paul Chan; essay by Richard Fletcher. Badlands Unlimited and the DESTE Foundation for Contemporary Art.
- Anonymous (2021). The Gospels (trans.) Modern Library.

=== Biblical interpretation ===
- Paul Among the People: The Apostle Reinterpreted and Reimagined in His Own Time. Image. 2011.
- The Face of Water: A Translator on Beauty and Meaning in the Bible. Pantheon. 2017.
