= Homosexuality in the New Testament =

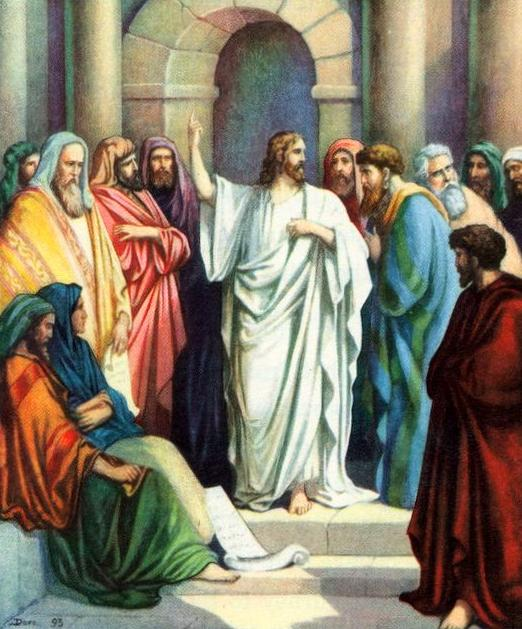
Jesus teaching in the Temple, illustration from Standard Bible Story Readers, 1928

Since 1980, scholars have debated the translation and modern relevance of New Testament texts on homosexuality. Three distinct passages – Romans 1:26–27, 1 Corinthians 6:9–10, and 1 Timothy 1:9–10 – as well as Jude 1:7, have been taken to condemn same-sex intercourse, but each passage remains contested. Whether these passages refer to homosexuality hinges on whether the social context limits the references to a more specific form: they may prohibit male pederasty or prostitution rather than homosexuality per se, while other scholars hold the position that these passages forbid sex between men in general. Another debate concerns the translation of key terms: arsenokoitēs (ἀρσενοκοίτης), malakos (μαλακός), and porneia (πορνεία) in 1 Corinthians 6:9 and 1 Timothy 1:9. Meanwhile, other passages in the New Testament, such as the Ethiopian Eunuch, the Centurion's Servant, and Jesus's teaching on divorce, might or might not refer to homosexuality.

== Romans 1:26–27 ==
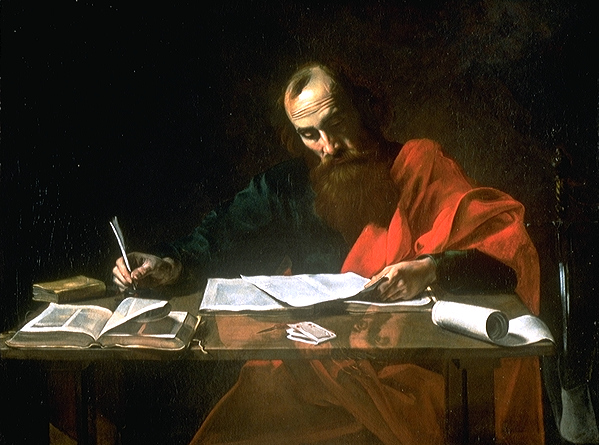
Saint Paul writing his Epistles

For this reason [viz. idolatry], God gave them up to passions of dishonor; for even their females exchanged the natural use for that which is contrary to nature, and likewise also the males, having left the natural use of the female, were inflamed by their lust for one another, males with males, committing what is shameful, and receiving in themselves the recompense which was fitting for their error.

The context within Romans 1:26–27 is Paul's mission to the gentiles, the gospel being "to the Jew first and to the Greek" (1:16), followed by a description of pagan idolatry in verses 1:21–25. The phrase "passions of dishonor" (KJV: "vile affections") translates πάθη ἀτιμίας, ἀτιμία atimia meaning 'dishonor, ignominy, disgrace'.

In the expressions "natural use" and "contrary to nature", "nature" translates φύσις, Physis. The term error translates πλάνη, planē (lit. 'straying, wandering').

David Aune says Paul is taking a protreptic approach, meaning that Paul taught on homoeroticism orally and then consolidated these views into written text in order to bring people to the gospel.

Furthermore, some contend 1:18–32 represents not Paul's own position but his summary of Hellenistic Jewish legalism. Calvin Porter, for example, concludes that "in 2:1–16, as well as through Romans as a whole, Paul, as part of his gentile mission, challenges, argues against, and refutes both the content of the discourse [of 1.18–32] and the practice of using such discourses. If that is the case, then the ideas in Rom. 1.18–32 are not Paul's. They are ideas which obstruct Paul's gentile mission theology and practice."

=== Natural law ===
The authors of the New Testament had their roots in the Jewish tradition, which is commonly interpreted as prohibiting homosexuality. A more conservative biblical interpretation contends "the most authentic reading of [Romans] 1:26–27 is that which sees it prohibiting homosexual activity in the most general of terms, rather than in respect of more culturally and historically specific forms of such activity".

Underlying Paul's thinking is Genesis 2:22–24, "The Lord God then built the rib that he had taken from the man into a woman. When he brought her to the man, the man said: "This one, at last, is bone of my bones and flesh of my flesh; ...That is why a man leaves his father and mother and clings to his wife, and the two of them become one body." For Paul, God's intended order is for male and female sexual relationships, united in marriage. Unnatural law is also related to who is being penetrated. Plato argues that homosexual penetration disrupts the hierarchy of men on top and women being mounted. That is what he saw as natural, and therefore same-sex relationships were unnatural. In 1 Romans, Paul is giving examples of what happens when people abandon God's plan.

The passage has been described by David Hilborn of the Evangelical Alliance as "the most important biblical reference for the homosexuality debate". In common with many traditional commentators, Hilborn goes on to argue that condemnation of homosexual activity is derived from the "broad contours" of Paul's argument, in addition to the selective reading of individual words or phrases.

Yale University professor John Boswell (1980) speculated that the text does not condemn homosexual acts by homosexuals, but rather "homosexual acts committed by apparently heterosexual persons". Boswell argues that the conceptual modality (natural laws) which would provide the basis for the condemnation of homosexuality did not exist prior to the Enlightenment era. Richard B. Hays argues that Romans 1:26–27 is part of a general condemnation of humans, in which males and females have rejected their creational (as in Genesis) distinctions, with homoeroticism being intrinsically wrong.

John J. McNeill (1993) also invokes "heterosexuals" who "abandoned heterosexuality" or "exchanged heterosexuality for homosexuality". Joe Dallas (1996), opposing what he saw as "pro-gay theology" behind such interpretations, contended that the apostle Paul is condemning changing "the natural use into that which is against nature" (Romans 1:26–27), and to suggest that Paul is referring to "heterosexuals indulging in homosexual behavior requires unreasonable mental gymnastics".

=== Idolatrous practices ===
Jeramy Townsley goes on to specify the context of Romans 1:26–27 as the continuation of Paul's condemnation of the worship of pagan gods from earlier in the chapter, linking the 'homosexuality' implied in Romans 1:27 to the practice of temple prostitution with castrated priests of Cybele, practices condemned more explicitly in the Old Testament (1 Kings 15:12, 2 Kings 23:7), the same religious group that violently attacked Paul in Ephesus, driving him from the city (Acts 19). The implication is that the goddess religions, the castrated priests, and temple prostitution had a wide impact in ancient Mediterranean culture and would immediately evoke an image for the 1st-century audience of non-Yahwistic religious idolatry, practices not familiar to the modern reader, which makes it easy to misinterpret these verses. Brooten notes that the idea of sexual acts between women was disapproved by pagan gods as well, noting that Isis turned Iphis into a male to cure "monstrous" love between Iphis and Ianthe, meaning gentile sin in pagan idol worship can not be directly linked to same-sex love. On the other hand, Brooten notes that Clement of Alexandria likely interpreted Romans 1:27 as a condemnation of lesbians. Mona West argues that Paul is condemning specific types of homosexual activity (such as temple prostitution or pederasty) rather than a broader interpretation. West argues that Paul is speaking to a gentile audience, in terms that they would understand, to show that "all have sinned and fallen short of the glory of God" (Romans 3:23).

=== Female homosexuality ===
In the Epistle to the Romans 1:26–27 (ESV), Paul writes, "For this reason God gave them up to dishonorable passions. For their women exchanged natural relations for those that are contrary to nature". This is the only apparent reference in the Bible to female homosexuality. Most interpreters assume that, due to the analogy with same-sex lust between males, Paul is referring to female same-sex behavior, although this assumption is not conclusive, and it remains difficult to discern exactly what Paul meant by women exchanging natural intercourse for unnatural.

"Unnatural" intercourse between women can also link to the passive-active role that was present in Roman culture. A female acting as a penetrator or a male acting as the penetrated would unhinge the standards of masculinity and femininity at the time.

While Paul does not explicitly address female same-sex relationships, Harper suggests that his silence speaks for itself and that Romans holds unspoken prejudice about the passive partner.

Brooten cites both Anastasios and Augustine as explicitly rejecting the 'lesbian hypothesis'. Hanks asserts that "not until John Chrysostom (c. 400 CE) does anyone (mis)interpret Romans 1:26 as referring to relations between two women". Townsley notes that other early writers, possibly including Chrysostom, reject the 'lesbian' hypothesis, specifically, Ambrosiaster, Didymus the Blind and Clement of Alexandria.

== Translating key terms ==
=== Arsenokoitēs ===
The Greek word arsenokoitēs appears in 1 Corinthians 6:9 and 1 Timothy 1:10. In 1 Corinthians 6:9–10, Paul says:

In English:

Or do you not know that wrongdoers will not inherit the kingdom of God? Do not be deceived: Neither the sexually immoral nor idolaters nor adulterers nor male prostitutes nor sodomites nor thieves nor the greedy nor drunkards nor slanderers nor swindlers will inherit the kingdom of God.

In Greek:

Ἢ οὐκ οἴδατε ὅτι ἄδικοι θεοῦ βασιλείαν οὐ κληρονομήσουσιν; μὴ πλανᾶσθε· οὔτε πόρνοι οὔτε εἰδωλολάτραι οὔτε μοιχοὶ οὔτε μαλακοὶ οὔτε ἀρσενοκοῖται οὔτε κλέπται οὔτε πλεονέκται, οὐ μέθυσοι, οὐ λοίδοροι, οὐχ ἅρπαγες βασιλείαν θεοῦ κληρονομήσουσιν.

The word translated as "practicing homosexuals" has been alternately rendered as "abusers of themselves with mankind" (King James Version, 21st Century King James Version), "sodomites" (Young's Literal Translation), or "homosexuals" (New American Standard Bible), "men who practice homosexuality" (English Standard Version), "those who abuse themselves with men" (Amplified Bible), "for those who have a twisted view of sex" (New International Readers Version), "for sexual perverts" (Good News Translation), "for abusers of themselves with men" (American Standard Version) or, in German and several other Northern European languages, as "pederasts." The original term is unknown before it appears in Paul's writings. ἀρσενοκοίτης (arsenokoitēs), meaning 'a male who lies down with a male' (ἄῤῥην/ἄρσην, arrhēn/arsēn, 'male'; κοίτης, koitēs, 'bed'), rather than the normal terms from the Greek culture. Within the Bible, it only occurs in this passage and in a similar list in 1 Timothy 1:9–10.

The term is thought to be either a Jewish coinage from the Greek (Septuagint) translation of Leviticus 20:13, (Note: καὶ ὃς ἂν κοιμηθῇ μετὰ ἄρσενος κοίτην γυναικός βδέλυγμα ἐποίησαν ἀμφότεροι θανατούσθωσαν ἔνοχοί εἰσιν) or even Paul's own coinage:

"If a man lies with a man ('arsenos koiten') as one lies with a woman, both of them have done what is detestable. They must be put to death; their blood will be on their own heads." Leviticus 20:13

==== Arguments against a reference to homosexual behavior ====
In contrast, John Boswell argues that this is a term specifically created by Paul, and that given its unusual nature, the fact that Paul did not use one of the more common pagan Greek terms, and given its direct reference to the Levitical laws, it is a matter of debate whether Paul was referring generally to any person having homosexual sex, or whether it referred only to anal sex of any form. Other translations of the word, based on examinations of the context of its subsequent uses, include Dale B. Martin's (1996), who argued it meant "homosexual slave trader", and Boswell's (1980) who argued it referred to "homosexual rape" or homosexual prostitutes. Like Martin Luther, Scroggs perceives it as referring to exploitative pederasty.

The term 'arsenokoitai' was rarely used in Church writings (Elliott 1994) with Townsley (2003), counting a total of 73 references. Most are ambiguous in nature, although St. John Chrysostom, in the 4th century, seems to use the term 'arsenokoitai' to refer to pederasty common in the Greco-Roman culture of the time, and Patriarch John IV of Constantinople in the 6th century used it to refer to anal sex: "some men even commit the sin of arsenokoitai with their wives" (Townsley 2003). Moreover, Hippolytus of Rome in his Refutation of all Heresies describes a Gnostic teaching, according to which an evil angel Naas committed adultery with Eve and arsenokoitēs with Adam. The context suggests the translation of 'arsenokoitēs' as pederasty, although it might have a different meaning.

John Boswell argues that 'arsenokoitēs' in 1 Corinthians 6:9 and 1 Timothy 1:10 refers specifically to male prostitution.

In his 2006 book Sex and the Single Savior, Dale B. Martin discusses examples of the word's usage outside of Paul's writings and argues that "no one knows" what it meant but that "It is certainly possible, I think probable, that arsenokoitēs referred to a particular role of exploiting others by means of sex, perhaps but not necessarily by homosexual sex."

In a footnote to his 2017 translation of the New Testament, David Bentley Hart writes, "My guess at the proper connotation of the word is based simply on the reality that in the first century the most common and readily available form of male homoerotic sexual activity was a master's or patron's exploitation of young male slaves."

==== Arguments for a reference to homosexual behavior ====
Some scholars argue the word is more against the restriction of the word to pederasty. For example, Scobie states that "there is no evidence that the term was restricted to pederasty; beyond doubt, the NT here repeats the Leviticus condemnation of all same-sex relations". Similarly, Campbell writes, "it must be pointed out, first, that arsenokoitēs is a broad term that cannot be confined to specific instances of homosexual activity such as male prostitution or pederasty. This is in keeping with the term's Old Testament background where lying with a 'male' (a very general term) is proscribed, relating to every kind of male-male intercourse." Campbell (quoting from Wenham) goes on to say that, "in fact, the Old Testament bans every type of homosexual intercourse, not just male prostitution or intercourse with youths."

Others have pointed out that the meaning of 'arsenokoitēs' is identified by its derivation from the Greek translation of the Old Testament, where the component words "with a man (arsenos) do not copulate coitus (koites) as with a woman" refer to homosexual conduct. For example, according to Hays, although the word 'arsenokoitēs' appears nowhere in Greek literature prior to Paul's use of it, it is evidently a rendering into Greek of the standard rabbinic term for "one who lies with a male [as with a woman]" (Leviticus 18:22; 20:13). Moreover, despite recent challenges to this interpretation, the meaning is confirmed by the evidence of Sybilline Oracles 2.73. Paul here repeats the standard Jewish condemnation of homosexual conduct. Malick (op cit) writes, "it is significant that of all the terms available in the Greek language, Paul chose a compound from the Septuagint that in the broadest sense described men lying with men as they would lie with women." According to Scobie, "it clearly echoes the Greek of [Leviticus] 18:22 and 20:13 in the LXX (arsen = "male", and koite = "bed"), so that arsenokoitēs literally means "one who goes to bed with a male".

David Wright argues that the compound word refers to those who sleep with males, and denotes "'male homosexual activity' without qualification." Haas, reviewing the various arguments on both sides, concluded that "an examination of the biblical passages from linguistic, historical and ethical-theological perspectives fails to support the revisionist ethic and reinforces the traditional Christian teaching that homosexual practice is morally wrong." Via also agrees that arsenokoitēs refers to homosexual activity. James B. De Young presents similar arguments.

Standard Greek lexicons and dictionaries understand this word as a reference to homosexual behavior. (Note: 'a male who engages in sexual activity w. a pers. of his own sex, pederast 1 Cor 6:9 (on the impropriety of RSV's 'homosexuals' [altered to 'sodomites' NRSV] s. WPetersen, VigChr 40, '86, 187–91; cp. DWright, ibid. 41, '87, 396–98; REB's rendering of μαλακοὶ οὔτε ἀρσενοκοῖται w. the single term 'sexual pervert' is lexically unacceptable), of one who assumes the dominant role in same-sex activity, opp. μαλακός (difft. DMartin, in Biblical Ethics and Homosexuality, ed. RBrawley, '96, 117–36); 1 Ti 1:10; Pol 5:3. Cp. Ro 1:27. Romans forbade pederasty w. free boys in the Lex Scantinia, pre-Cicero (JBremmer, Arethusa 13, '80, 288 and notes); Paul's strictures against same-sex activity cannot be satisfactorily explained on the basis of alleged temple prostitution (on its rarity, but w. some evidence concerning women used for sacred prostitution at Corinth s. LWoodbury, TAPA 108, '78, 290f, esp. note 18 [lit.]), or limited to contract w. boys for homoerotic service (s. Wright, VigChr 38, '84, 125–53).', Arndt, Danker, & Bauer (eds.), 'A Greek-English Lexicon of the New Testament and Other Early Christian Literature', p. 135 (3rd ed. 2000).)

=== Malakos ===
This word is translated as "male prostitutes" (NRSV), "effeminate" (NASB), or "catamites" (TJB; in the footnotes of the NKJV), in 1 Corinthians 6:9.

==== Arguments against a reference to homosexual behavior ====
The Greek word μαλακός; malakos carries a root meaning of soft, luxurious or dainty, but here, G. Fee argues, it is used in a derivative way, possibly referring to the more passive partner in a homosexual relationship. According to Scroggs (op. cit.), the word malakos in Paul's list refers specifically to this category of person, the effeminate call-boy. Others, for example Olson, based on previous and subsequent uses of the term, interpret malakos to mean an effeminate but not necessarily homosexual man. Olson argues that the μαλακοί in Paul's time, "almost always referred in a negative, pejorative way to a widely despised group of people who functioned as effeminate 'call boys'."

Dale B. Martin argues that "it would never have occurred to an ancient person to think that malakos or any other word indicating the feminine in itself referred to homosexual sex at all. It could just as easily refer to heterosexual sex."

==== Arguments for a reference to homosexual behavior ====
Lexical evidence from Greek texts indicates the word was used to refer to the passive partner in a male homosexual act. For example, Malick (op cit) writes that a significant expression of this usage is found in a letter (Note: "Demophon to Ptolemaeus, greeting. Make every effort to send me the flute-player Petoüs with both the Phrygian flutes and the rest; and if any expense is necessary, pay it, and you shall recover it from me. Send me also Zenobius the effeminate [μαλακόν] with a drum and cymbals and castanets, for he is wanted by the women for the sacrifice; and let him wear as fine clothes as possible" ("Letter of Demophon to Ptolemaeus" [from mummy wrappings found in the necropolis of El-Hibeh about 245 B.C.], The Hibeh Papyri: Part I, no. 54, 200–201).) from Demophon, a wealthy Egyptian, to Ptolemaeus, a police official, concerning needed provisions for a coming festival. According to Ukleja, "a strong possible translation of both malakos (and arsenokoitēs) is the morally loose (effeminate) who allow themselves to be used homosexually and the person who is a practicing homosexual." Ukleja cites a number of classical Greek sources in support of his assertion. (Note: In classical Greek, μαλακός was also used to refer to boys and men who allowed themselves to be used homosexually. It was also applied to a man taking the female or passive role in homosexuality. Dionysius of Halicarnassus, who wrote Roman Antiquities around 7 B.C., described Aristodemus of Cumae as μαλακός because he had been "effeminate" (θηλυδρίας) as a child and had undergone the things associated with women. In classical literature the word μαλακός is sometimes applied to obviously gay persons. Lucian describes the blood of some priests he condemns for passive homosexual behavior as μαλακός. This cannot be dismissed as not indicating anything about the sexuality of the individuals in question. These were priests who spent their time seeking group sexual encounters. While there is some ambiguity with regard to μαλακός, it is not beyond reason to see the word representing the passive parties in homosexual intercourse. This is even more reasonable when it is in juxtaposition with ἀρσενοκοιτής which does imply an active homosexual role. It is interesting that in Aristotle's Problems, a lengthy discussion of the origins of homosexual passivity, he employs the word μαλακός. In its general sense the word does mean "unrestrained," but not without any particularly homosexual context (Ukleja, op cit).)

The meaning of the word is not confined to male prostitutes. According to Malick (op. cit.), when malakos is employed in reference to sexual relationships of men with men, it is not a technical term for male call-boys in a pederastic setting. The term may mean effeminate with respect to boys or men who take the role of a woman in homosexual relationships. Nor is the meaning of the word confined to sexually exploited males. (Note: 'The terms malakoi and molles could be used broadly to refer to effeminate or unmanly men. But in specific contexts it could be used in ways similar to the more specific terms cinaedi (lit., "butt-shakers") and pathici ("those who undergo [penetration]") to denote effeminate adult males who are biologically and/or psychologically disposed to desire penetration by men. For example, in Soranus's work On Chronic Diseases (early 2nd century A.D.) the section on men who desire to be penetrated (4.9.131-37) is entitled "On the molles or subacti (subjugated or penetrated partners, pathics) whom the Greeks call malthakoi." An Aristotelian text similarly refers to those who are anatomically inclined toward the receptive role as malakoi (Pseudo-Aristotle, Problems 4.26). Astrological texts that speak of males desirous of playing the penetrated female role also use the term malakoi (Ptolemy, Four Books 3.14 §172; Vettius Valens, Anthologies 2.37.54; 2.38.82; cf. Brooten, 126 n. 41, 260 n. 132). The complaint about such figures in the ancient world generally, and certainly by Philo, centers around their attempted erasure of the masculine stamp given them by God/nature, not their exploitation of others, age difference, or acts of prostitution.', Gagnon, 'Dale Martin and the Myth of Total Textual Indeterminacy' (2007); http://www.robgagnon.net/DaleMartinResponse.htm.)

Standard Greek lexicons and dictionaries understand this word as a reference to the passive partner in a male homosexual act. (Note: 'pert. to being passive in a same-sex relationship, effeminate esp. of catamites, of men and boys who are sodomized by other males in such a relationship, opp. ἀρσενοκοίτης (Dionys. Hal. 7, 2, 4; Dio Chrys. 49 [66], 25; Ptolem., Apotel. 3, 15, 10; Vett. Val. 113, 22; Diog. L. 7, 173; PHib 54, 11 [c. 245 B.C.] may have this mng.: a musician called Zenobius ὁ μαλακός [prob. with a sideline, according to Dssm., LO 131, 4—LAE 164, 4]. S. also a Macedon. ins in LDuchesne and CBayet, Mémoire sur une Mission au Mont Athos 1876 no. 66 p. 46; Plautus, Miles 668 cinaedus [Gk. κίναιδος] malacus; cp. the attack on the morality of submissive homoeroticism Aeschines 1, 188; DCohen, Greece and Rome 23, '76, 181f) 1 Cor 6:9 ('male prostitutes' NRSV is too narrow a rendering; 'sexual pervert' REB is too broad)=Pol 5:3.—S. lit. s.v. ἀρσενοκοίτης. B. 1065. DELG. M-M.', Arndt, Danker, & Bauer (eds.), 'A Greek-English Lexicon of the New Testament and Other Early Christian Literature', p. 613 (3rd ed. 2000).) (Note: The vice catalog of 1 Cor 6:9 mentions the μαλακοί, soft people / weaklings, as reprehensible examples of passive homosexuality (cf. Rom 1:27; Lev 20:13; Ep. Arist. 152; Sib. Or. 3:184ff., 584ff.; see Billerbeck III, 70; H. Conzelmann, 1 Cor [Hermeneia] ad loc. [bibliography]).', Balz & Schneider, 'Exegetical Dictionary of the New Testament', volume 2, p. 381 (1990).) (Note: 'figuratively, in a bad sense of men effeminate, unmanly; substantively ὁ μ. especially of a man or boy who submits his body to homosexual lewdness catamite, homosexual pervert (1C 6.9)', Friberg, Friberg, & Miller, 'Analytical Lexicon of the Greek New Testament', p. 252 (2000).) (Note: '88.281 μαλακόςb, οῦ m: the passive male partner in homosexual intercourse—'homosexual.' For a context of μαλακόςb, see 1 Cor 6:9–10 in 88.280. As in Greek, a number of other languages also have entirely distinct terms for the active and passive roles in homosexual intercourse.', Louw & Nida, 'Greek-English lexicon of the New Testament: Based on semantic domains', volume 1, p. 771-772 (electronic ed. of the 2nd edition 1996).) (Note: '3120. μαλακός malakós; fem. malakḗ, neut. malakón, adj. Soft to the touch, spoken of clothing made of soft materials, fine texture (Matt. 11:8; Luke 7:25). Figuratively it means effeminate or a person who allows himself to be sexually abused contrary to nature. Paul, in 1 Cor. 6:9, joins the malakoí, the effeminate, with arsenokoítai (733), homosexuals, Sodomites.', Zodhiates, 'The Complete Word Study Dictionary: New Testament' (electronic ed. 2000).) Most scholars think it means someone willfully engaged in homosexual relations.

Some theologians have argued that, when read in historical context, the Jewish Platonist philosopher Philo of Alexandria used the term in reference to temple prostitution. (Note: In the New American Bible, there is a footnote which reads, "The Greek word translated as boy prostitutes may refer to catamites, i.e., boys or young men kept for purposes of prostitution, a practice not uncommon in the Greco-Roman world. In Greek mythology, this was the function of Ganymeade, the "cupbearer of the gods," whose Latin name was Cataminus. The term translated sodomites refers to adult males who indulged in homosexual practices with such boys.", esp. "...when Philo reads the Biblical laws against homosexuality, he interprets them as a reference to the expression of that act prevailing in his day - pederastry - in both secular form and in prostitution, especially as performed by the womanized malakos [...] Young boys were commonly forced to serve as homosexual prostitutes in the gates of idol temples.")

According to Roy Ward, malakos was used to describe an item soft to the touch, such as a soft pillow or cloth. When used negatively, the term meant faint-hearted, lacking in self-control, weak or morally weak with no link to same-gender sexual behavior.

=== Porneia ===
In Matthew 15: 19-20 (KJV) Jesus says:

For out of the heart proceed evil thoughts, murders, adulteries, fornications, thefts, false witness, blasphemies: These are the things which defile a man: but to eat with unwashen hands defileth not a man.

In Mark 7: 20-23 (KJV) it says:

And he said, That which cometh out of the man, that defileth the man. For from within, out of the heart of men, proceed evil thoughts, adulteries, sexual impurities, murders, thefts, covetousness, wickedness, deceit, lasciviousness, an evil eye, blasphemy, pride, foolishness: All these evil things come from within, and defile the man.

Whether these lists include homosexuality depends on the translation of porneia (sexual impurity). Translations of these passages generally translate porneia as fornication rather than sexual impurity (see Leviticus). Some interpret the translation of porneia more broadly, to encompass sexual immorality in general, though there is disagreement over whether such an interpretation is supported by the writings of the Church Fathers.

=== 1 Corinthians 6:9–10 ===
King James Version (1611): "Know ye not that the unrighteous shall not inherit the kingdom of God? Be not deceived: neither fornicators, nor idolaters, nor adulterers, nor effeminate, nor abusers of themselves with mankind"

The phrase "abusers of themselves with mankind" translates arsenokoitai, also rendered "sodomites" (YLT), or "men who have sex with men" (NIV). Paul's use of the word in 1 Corinthians is the earliest example of the term; its only other usage is in a similar list of wrongdoers given (possibly by the same author) in 1 Timothy 1:8–11. The term rendered as "effeminate" is malakoi, with a literal meaning of "soft". Nowhere else in Scripture is malakos used to describe a person.

These verses are a continuation of Paul's berating the Christians at Corinth for suing one another before pagan judges in Roman courts, which he sees as an infringement upon the holiness of the Christian community. Paul lists a catalogue of typical vices that exclude a person from the kingdom of God, specifically vices that the church members either practiced and would still be practicing but for the fact they were now Christians, with the express intention of showing church members that they ought to be able to settle minor disputes within the community, and above all, deal with each other charitably.

=== 1 Timothy 1:9–10 ===
King James Version (1611): "Knowing this, that the law is not made for a righteous man, but for the lawless and disobedient, for the ungodly and for sinners, for unholy and profane, for murderers of fathers and murderers of mothers, for manslayers, For whoremongers, for them that defile themselves with mankind, for menstealers, for liars, for perjured persons, and if there be any other thing that is contrary to sound doctrine"

The term relevant to homosexuality, "that defile themselves with mankind", translates ἀρσενοκοίτης ('arsenokoitēs'), the same term for homosexuals used in 1 Corinthians. Other translations of the term include: "them that do lechery with men" (Wycliffe 1382), "those practicing homosexuality" (NIV), "those who abuse themselves with men" (Amplified Version, 1987).

== Other New Testament passages ==
=== Eunuchs ===
In Matthew 19:12, Jesus discusses eunuchs who were born as such, eunuchs who were made so by others, and eunuchs who choose to live as such for the kingdom of heaven. Clement of Alexandria wrote in his commentary on it that "some men, from their birth, have a natural sense of repulsion from a woman; and those who are naturally so constituted, do well not to marry".

The First Council of Nicaea in 325 AD established 20 new laws called canons. The first of these was the prohibition of self castration.

The Ethiopian eunuch, an early gentile convert encountered in Acts 8, has been described as an early gay Christian, based on the fact that the word "eunuch" in the Bible was not always used literally, as in Matthew 19:12.

=== Jude 1:7 ===
King James Version (1611): "Even as Sodom and Gomorrah, and the cities about them in like manner, giving themselves over to fornication, and going after strange flesh, are set forth for an example, suffering the vengeance of eternal fire."

The expression of "giving themselves over to fornication" translates ἐκπορνεύσασαι, 'ekporneusasai', rendered as "sexual immorality" in both NIV and ESV; the phrase "going after strange flesh" is a literal translation of ἀπελθοῦσαι ὀπίσω σαρκὸς ἑτέρας, rendered as "perversion" in NIV and as "pursued unnatural desire" in ESV. However, scholarly debate remains open whether the transgression of Sodom and Gomorrah is rooted in homosexual actions or consistent with Genesis stories regarding Abraham's hospitality to strangers (see Sodom and Gomorrah § Religious views).

Simon J. Kistemaker notes that the Greek phrase 'σαρκὸς ἑτέρας' (sarkos heteras, "strange flesh") is often interpreted as the specific desire on the part of the Sodomites to have sexual relations with angels. Kistemaker, however, argues that it means they were "interested in sexual relations with men."

=== The Centurion's Servant ===
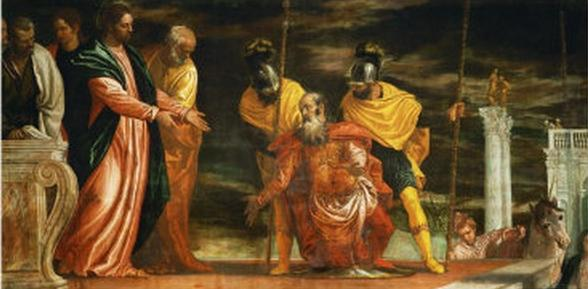
Healing the Centurion's servant by Paolo Veronese, 16th century.

This event is referred to in both Matthew 8:5-13 and Luke 7:1-10 and tells of Jesus healing a centurion's servant. Luke 7:2 (TNIV) says: "There a centurion's servant, whom his master valued highly, was sick and about to die." The term translated from the Greek as "servant" in this verse is δουλος (doulos. Elsewhere in the two accounts, the term used for the ill person is παῖς (pais), a term that can be translated in a number of different ways including "child" (e.g., Matthew 2:16; Lk 2:43, 8:51-54 where it refers to a girl), "son" (John 4:51) or "servant" (Lk 15:26, Acts 4:25); elsewhere it is unclear whether "son" or "servant" is meant (Acts 3:13, 3:26, 4:27, 4:30).

Horner and Daniel A. Helminiak both suggest a homosexual theme to this text. Helminiak argues that this is implied by the broader context of the narrative, suggesting an unusual level of concern about the servant, whereas Horner suggests that the use of the term "valued highly" implies a sexual relationship. Horner goes on to argue that, as Jesus commended the centurion for his faith (Matthew 8:10; Luke 7:9), it shows that Jesus approved of their relationship; otherwise, he would have condemned him. However, a contrasting viewpoint is that the term "highly valued" (ἔντιμος, entimos) simply suggests a genuine care for the person or, more archaically, that the centurion was fond of this slave, and that the term entimos has no hint of sexual content in any of its various appearances in the Bible.

=== Jesus on marriage and divorce ===
In the synoptic Gospels, Jesus discusses marriage only in a heterosexual context when he cites the Book of Genesis during a discussion of divorce (Mark 10:6–9 and Matthew 19:4–6).

=== Developmental sexuality ===
Thomas E. Schmidt's dictionary entry on the topic concludes that a process of spirituality and sexuality is developmental in the life of Christian believers and proper instruction is towards "a growth in discipleship" rather than self-identity.

== History of reception ==
The history of Christianity and homosexuality has been much debated. The Hebrew Bible/Old Testament and its traditional interpretations in Judaism and Christianity have historically affirmed and endorsed a patriarchal and heteronormative approach towards human sexuality, favouring exclusively penetrative vaginal intercourse between men and women within the boundaries of marriage over all other forms of human sexual activity, including autoeroticism, masturbation, oral sex, non-penetrative and non-heterosexual sexual intercourse (all of which have been labeled as "sodomy" at various times), believing and teaching that such behaviors are forbidden because they are considered sinful, and further compared to or derived from the behavior of the alleged residents of Sodom and Gomorrah. However, the status of homosexuals in early Christianity is debated. Throughout the majority of Christian history, most Christian theologians and denominations have considered homosexual behavior as immoral or sinful.

Many commentators have argued that the references to homosexuality in the New Testament, or the Bible in general, have to be understood in their proper historical context. Indeed, most interpreters come to the text with a preconceived notion of what the Bible has to say about normative sexual behaviors, influencing subsequent interpretations. For example, William Walker says that the very notion of "homosexuality" (or even "heterosexuality", "bisexuality" and "sexual orientation") is essentially a modern concept that would simply have been unintelligible to the New Testament writers. The word "homosexuality" and the concept of sexual orientation as being separate from one's perceived masculinity or femininity (i.e. gender identity) did not take shape until the 19th century. Moreover, although some ancient Romans (i.e., doctors, astrologers, etc.) discussed congenital inclinations to unconventional sexual activities such as homosexuality, this classification fails to correspond to a modern psychological, biological and genetic distinction between homosexual, heterosexual and bisexual orientations. However, according to Gagnon, the concept of homosexual orientation was not wholly unknown in the Greco-Roman milieu. Moreover, he asserts that there is absolutely no evidence that modern orientation theory would have had any impact on Paul changing his strong negative valuation of homosexual practice.

A statement by the Bishops of the Church of England ("Issues in Human Sexuality") in 1991 illustrates a categorization and understanding of homosexuality, claiming that in ancient times "society recognized the existence of those, predominantly male, who appeared to be attracted entirely to members of their own sex." ("Issues in Human Sexuality" para 2.16, lines 8-9), which almost parallels that of modern ideation. The same study is careful to point out that "the modern concept of orientation has been developed against a background of genetic and psychological theory which was not available to the ancient world."

Sarah Ruden, in her Paul Among the People (2010) argues that the only form of homosexual sex that was apparent to the public in Paul's time was exploitative pederasty, in which slave boys were raped by adult males, often very violently. Paul's condemnation of homosexuality, Ruden argues, can be interpreted most plausibly as a criticism of this kind of brutally exploitative behavior.

== See also ==
- The Bible and homosexuality
