= Theodore Jennings =

American theologian and Methodist minister

The Reverend Theodore Jennings
- Born: Theodore Wesley Jennings Jr. October 24, 1942
- Died: March 25, 2020 (aged 77); Mexico City, Mexico
- Other name: Ted Jennings

Ecclesiastical career
- Religion: Christianity (Methodist)
- Church: United Methodist Church

Academic background
- Education: Duke University; Emory University
- Thesis: Man as the Subject of Existence (1971)
- Doctoral advisor: Theodore Runyon

Academic work
- Discipline: Theology
- Sub-discipline: Biblical theology; constructive theology
- Institutions: Chicago Theological Seminary
- Doctoral students: Adam Kotsko

Theodore Wesley Jennings Jr. (born 1942–2020), also known as Ted Jennings, was an American theologian and Methodist minister. He was professor of Biblical and constructive theology at the United Church of Christ's Chicago Theological Seminary, where he had previously served as acting academic dean. Jennings gained a notoriety for his work on ritual studies, the Messianic politics of Pauline discourse, and theological engagement with the work of Dietrich Bonhoeffer and Jacques Derrida.

Jennings's theology related to LGBT matters was welcomed in progressive circles, but was cast as outright heretical by conservative theologians such as R. Albert Mohler, a Southern Baptist theologian and minister. This opprobrium also appeared when he published across ecumenical aisles, such as when he was called a heretic by Charlotte Allen of the non-denominational Institute on Religion and Public Life on account of his collaborations with Tat-siong Benny Liew of the College of the Holy Cross.

== Biography ==
Jennings was born on October 24, 1942. He received his Bachelor of Arts degree from Duke University in 1964 and his Bachelor of Divinity and Doctor of Philosophy degrees from Emory University in 1967 and 1971 respectively. He taught for three years at Seminario Metodista (Methodist Seminary) in Mexico City and is an ordained Methodist minister. His scholarly work and publications have focused on a broad array of topics, such as Methodism, ritual studies, biblical hermeneutics, liberation theology, LGBT rights and queer theology, the politics of Pauline Messianism, and the work of Jacques Derrida.

Following a serious stroke on March 5, 2020, at his second home near Acapulco, Mexico, Jennings was transported by ambulance to Hospital Angeles Roma in Mexico City, where he died almost three weeks later on March 25, 2020.

== Works ==
- An Ethic of Queer Sex: Principles and Improvisations. Exploration Press, Chicago, Illinois 2013, ISBN 978-0-913552-72-8
- Transforming Atonement: A Political Theology of the Cross. Fortress Press, Minneapolis 2009. ISBN 9780800663506
- Plato or Paul? The Origins of Western Homophobia. Pilgrim Press, Cleveland 2009, ISBN 0-8298-1855-3
- Jacob's Wound: Homoerotic Narrative in the Literature of Ancient Israel. Continuum, New York 2005, ISBN 0-8264-1712-4
- Reading Derrida, Thinking Paul: On Justice. Stanford University Press, Stanford, California 2005, ISBN 0-8047-5267-2
- Mistaken Identities but Model Faith: Rereading the Centurion, the Chap, and the Christ in Matthew 8:5-13. Theodore W. Jennings Jr. and Tat-Siong Benny Liew. Journal of Biblical Literature Vol. 123, No. 3 (Autumn, 2004), pp. 467–494
- The Insurrection of the Crucified: The ‘Gospel of Mark’ as Theological Manifesto. Exploration Press, Chicago, Illinois 2003, ISBN 0-913552-65-8
- The Man Jesus Loved: Homoerotic Narratives from the New Testament. Pilgrim Press, Cleveland 2003, ISBN 0-8298-1535-X
- Santidad bìblica (Seminario Metodista de Mexico), 2002
- Loyalty to God: The Apostles Creed in Life and Liturgy. Abingdon Press, Nashville 1992, ISBN 0-687-22821-2
- Good News to the Poor: John Wesley’s Evangelical Economics. Abingdon Press, Nashville 1990, ISBN 0-687-15528-2
- Beyond Theism: A Grammar of God-Language. Oxford University Press, New York 1985, ISBN 0-19-503613-1
- Introduction to Theology: an Invitation to Reflection on the Christian Mythos. London: SPCK. 1977. ISBN 0281029857.
