= Jinja North United FC =

Association football club in Uganda

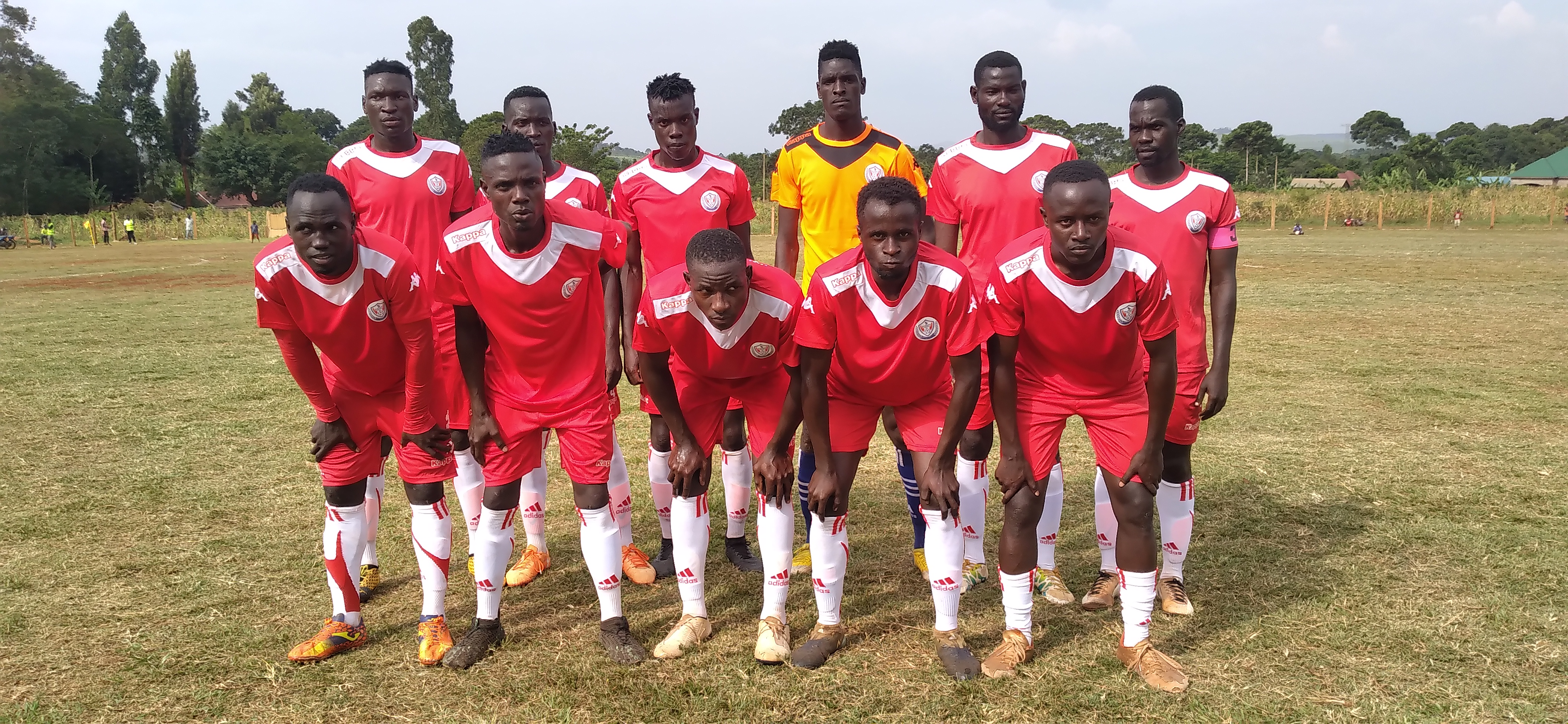
- Full name: Jinja North United Football Club
- Founded: 2010
- Ground: Wakitaka / Namulesa, Jinja City, Uganda
- League: FUFA Big League

Jinja North United FC is a Ugandan association football club based in Wakitaka /Namulesa Jinja City. The club competes in the FUFA Big League, the second tier of the Ugandan football league.

== History ==
The club was established in 2010 to represent communities in the northern part of Jinja City and surrounding areas. The club participates in FUFA competitions, including the FUFA Big League and the Uganda Cup.In the 2021–22 Uganda Cup, Jinja North United were eliminated by Maroons FC after a penalty shoot-out following a 1–1 draw in regulation time.

During the 2023-2024 FUFA Big League season, the club participated in different fixtures including a 1-1 draw with Booma FC.

== Stadium ==
Jinja North United plays its home matches at Kyabazinga Stadium, located in Bugembe, Jinja City. The stadium hosts league and cup fixtures and is shared by several football clubs in the region.

== Technical team (2023- 2024) ==
Jinja North United FC is administered by a technical and management team responsible for football operations and player development.

Technical Team
No	NAME	ROLE	REF
1	Sadiq ssempigi	Head Coach (2023–2024)	
2	Edward Ssali	Assistant Coach	
3	Peter Mugabi	Assistant Coach	
4	Aziz Kemba	Trainer	
5	Abdallah Lumweno	Trainer	
6	Fredrick Lumu	Goalkeeping Coach	
7	Kalimu Kagoda	Stores manager	

== Players ==
The club’s squad is composed mainly of Ugandan footballers, combining experienced players and emerging talents from local leagues.

A LIST OF CLUB PLAYERS
NO	NAME	DATE SINCE	FROM
1	Dickson Matama	12.12.2023	
2	Etoju Amos	16.11.2023	Myda
3	Mwanje Samuel	11.10.2023	Kampala City
4	Nsubuga Branson	21.09.2023	Black Powers
5	Luzige Nicholas	20.09.2023	
6	Wasswa Shaban	20.09.2023	UPDF
7	Nduga Lawrence	05.07.2023	Orapa United
8	Basoga Derrick	01.07.2023	Busoga
9	Hakim Magombe	09.2023	Topflight club Mbarara City
10	Mutwalibu Mugolofa	09.2023	
11	Johnson Ssenyonga	09.2023	
12	Isaac Mukiibi	09.2023	
13	Huud Salim	09.2023	
14	Isaac Kiiza	09.2023	
15	Micheal Kibi Kimera	09.2023	
16	Outa Dickson	09.2023	
17	Arop Desmond	09.2023	
18	Brian Muruli Mayanja	2023	Mbitibwa Sugars FC (Tanzania)
19	Bernaldo Kateregga	2023	Uganda Police FC
20	Deo Isejja		
