= 2015–16 Kampala Capital City Authority FC season =

KCCA FC
2015–16 season
- Chairman: Julius Kabugo
- Manager: Mike Mutebi
- Stadium: Lugogo Stadium
- Top goalscorer: League: (0); All: Tom Matsiko (2); Muzamir Mutyaba (2)
Home colours	Away colours	Third colours

The 2015–16 season is KCCA F.C's 2nd season in the Uganda Premier League sponsored by AZAM TV and the league is reported by its commercial name the Azam Premier League, and their 49th consecutive season in the top-flight of Ugandan football. Along with the Uganda Premier League, the club will also compete in the Uganda Cup/Kakunguru Cup and the Cecafa Kagame Interclub Cup. The season covers the period from 15 July 2015 to 15 June 2016.

== Prepations ==
Kampala Capital City Authority F.C introduced their road to 2015/2016 Season. They began with the major changes that is, it all began by the club C.E.O announcing their budget of 1.4 Billion Uganda Shillings in partnership with their major sponsors Startimes Uganda. And on the same occasion held on 19 June 2015 saw the C.E.O Jennifer Musisi announce their new coaching team of manager Mike Mutebi and Sam Simbwa as the second in command or as his assistant.

== Pre-Friendlies ==
Date	Opponents	H / A	Result F–A	Scorers
1 July 2015	Kamwocha	N	1–3	O.g
3 July 2015	Masavu FC	H	1-0	Nsibambi Derick 78'
15 July 2015	Uganda Kobs(U23)	N	0–1	

== Kagame Inteclub Cup ==
Kampala Capital City Authority FC is participating in the 41st CECAFA interclub Cup and the 13th Cecafa Kagame Interclub Cup due to the sponsorship naming rights. KCCA will be representing Uganda because they merged as the Champions of Uganda's Top League in 2014. Draws were held on 1 July 2015, the tournament that started on 18 July and is to end on 2 August 2015 in Dar es Salaam, Tanzania. KCCA FC was drawn in Group C with Malakia of South Sudan, Azam of Tanzania and Adama City of Ethiopia.

KCCA managed to get over a devastating start of the tournament after losing to Azam FC a team of the host nation and improving their performance on the pitch and mentally, winning the rest of the games in the group that enabled KCCA qualify to the Quarter finals with Six points. With the side losing again to Azam in the semi-final game they were facing for the second time in the tournament, Kampala Capital City Authority FC came to win a bronze medal after showing a good display to the Sudanese side Khartoum National Team by 2–1.

Group C
Team	Pld	W	D	L	GF	GA	GD	Pts
(Tanzania) Azam	3	3	0	0	8	0	+8	9
(Uganda) Kampala C.C.A.	3	2	0	1	2	1	+1	6
(South Sudan) Al-Malakia	3	1	0	2	2	4	−2	3
(Ethiopia) Adama City	3	0	0	3	1	8	−7	0

19 July 2015
Azam FC (Tanzania)	1–0	(Uganda) KCCA FC
22 July 2015
KCCA FC (Uganda)	1–0	(Ethiopia) Adama City
25 July 2015
Malakia (South Sudan)	0–1	(Uganda) KCCA FC

Date	Opponents	Venue	Result F–A	Scorers	Group position
19 July 2015	Azam (Tanzania)	N	0–1		3rd
22 July 2015	Adama City (Ethiopia)	N	1–0	Timothy Matsiko (pen)	2nd
25 July 2015	Malakia (South Sudan)	N	1–0	Isaac Sserunkuma 15'	2nd

QUARTER FINALS

29 July 2015
Al Ahly Shandy (Sudan)	0–3	(Uganda) KCCA FC

Date	Opponents	H / A	Result F–A	Scorers
29 July 2015	Al Ahly Shandy (Sudan)	N	3-0	Joseph Ochaya 15', Muzamir Mutyaba(pen) 75', Tom Matsiko 76'

SEMI FINALS

29 July 2015
Azam (Tanzania)	1–0	(Uganda) KCCA FC

Date	Opponents	H / A	Result F–A	Scorers
29 July 2015	Azam (Tanzania)	N	0–1	

LOSERS' MATCH

2 August 2015
Khartoum-N (Sudan)	1–2	(Uganda) KCCA FC

Date	Opponents	H / A	Result F–A	Scorers
2 August 2015	Khartoum-N (Sudan)	N	2-1	Birungi Micheal 7', Muzamir Mutyaba 8'

== Squad statistics ==
No.	Pos.	Name	League		Uganda Cup		Cecafa Cup		Total		Discipline	
No.	Pos.	Name	Apps	Goals	Apps	Goals	Apps	Goals	Apps	Goals	Yellow card	Red card
1	GK	(Uganda) Benjamin Ochan	0	0	0	0	1(3)	0	1(3)	0	0	0
2	MF	(Uganda) Habib Kavuma	0	0	0	0	2(3)	0	2(3)	0	0	0
3	DF	(Uganda) Sakka Mpiima	0	0	0	0	2(2)	0	2(2)	0	0	0
4	MF	(Uganda) Ntege Ivan	0	0	0	0	5(1)	0	5(1)	0	2	0
5	MF	(Uganda) Timothy Awanyi	0	0	0	0	5(1)	0	5(1)	0	0	0
6	DF	(Uganda) Hakim Senkumba	0	0	0	0	4(2)	0	4(2)	0	0	0
7	MF	(Uganda) Tom Matsiko (C)	0	0	0	0	6	2	6	2	0	0
8	FW	(Uganda) Derrick Nsibambi	0	0	0	0	3	0	3	0	1	0
10	MF	(Uganda) Muzamir Mutyaba	0	0	0	0	6	2	6	2	0	0
11	MF	(Uganda) Birungi Micheal	0	0	0	0	4	1	4	1	1	1
12	FW	(Tanzania) Konda Shaban	0	0	0	0	1(4)	0	1(4)	0	0	0
15	FW	(Uganda) Denis Okot Oola	0	0	0	0	4(2)	0	4(2)	0	1	0
18	MF	(Uganda) Kasule Owen	0	0	0	0	0(2)	0	0(2)	0	0	0
19	DF	(Uganda) Martin Mpuuga	0	0	0	0	1(2)	0	1(2)	0	0	0
22	MF	(Uganda) Hassan 'Dazo' Wasswa	0	0	0	0	6	0	6	0	0	0
23	DF	(Uganda) Joseph Ochaya	0	0	0	0	6	1	6	1	2	0
24	GK	(Uganda) Emmanuel Opio	0	0	0	0	5(1)	0	5(1)	0	0	0
_	FW	(Uganda) Nsubuga Den	0	0	0	0	2(2)	0	2(2)	0		0
_	FW	(Uganda) Farouk Matovu	0	0	0	0	0(1)	0	0(1)	0	0	0
_	FW	(Uganda) Deniel Isiagi	0	0	0	0	0	0	0	0	0	0
_	DF	(Uganda) Richard Kasagga	0	0	0	0	0	0	0	0	0	0
_	FW	(Uganda) Isaac Sserunkuma	0	0	0	0	2(2)	1	2(2)	1	0	0
_	FW	(Uganda) Richard Ayiko	0	0	0	0	0	0	0	0	0	0

Statistics accurate as of match played 13.30hrs 2 August 2015

== Transfers ==
=== In ===
Date	Pos.	Name	From	Fee
23 June 2015	FW	(Uganda) Daniel Isiagi	United States	Undisclosed
23 June 2015	DF	(Uganda) Richard Kasagga	(Uganda) Kiira Young	Undisclosed
23 June 2015	DF	(Uganda) Martin Mpuuga	(Uganda) SCVU	Undisclosed
23 June 2015	FW	(Uganda) Daniel Nsubuga	(Uganda) SCVU	Undisclosed
23 June 2015	MF	(Uganda) Muzamir Mutyaba	(Uganda) SCVU	Undisclosed
23 June 2015	FW	(Uganda) Denis Okot	(Uganda) SCVU	Undisclosed
23 June 2015	FW	(Uganda) Isaac Sserunkuma	(Uganda) Express FC	Undisclosed
23 June 2015	FW	(Uganda) Richard Ayiko	(Uganda) Maroons FC	Undisclosed
23 June 2015	FW	(Uganda) Hassan ‘Dazo’ Wasswa	(Uganda) Express FC	Undisclosed

=== Out ===
Date	Pos.	Name	To	Fee
20 June 2015	MF	(Uganda) Ronnie Kiseka	(Uganda) Bright Stars FC	Undisclosed

=== Loan in ===
Date from	Date to	Pos.	Name	From

=== Loan Out ===
Date from	Date to	Pos.	Name	From
