= Paul Among the People =

2010 book by Sarah Ruden

Paul Among the People: The Apostle Reinterpreted and Reimagined in His Own Time
- Cover of the 2010 hardback edition
- Author: Sarah Ruden
- Language: English
- Genre: Theology, Classical studies
- Publisher: Pantheon Books
- Publication date: 2010
- Media type: Print (hardcover and softcover), e-book, audiobook
- Pages: 214 pp.
- ISBN: 978-0375425011

Paul Among the People: The Apostle Reinterpreted and Reimagined in His Own Time is a 2010 book by the poet and classical literature translator Sarah Ruden. In it, Ruden uses literary analysis of Greco-Roman poetry, drama and fiction to provide context for the Pauline epistles. She begins from the premise that modern critics and many Christians have either rejected the writings of Paul the Apostle or found them uncomfortable due to his teachings on women, marriage, slavery, homosexuality and submission to the state. However, by contextualizing Paul's writings with ancient literature—including Aristophanes, Catullus, Horace, Juvenal, Martial, Ovid, Petronius and Virgil—Ruden argues that Paul should not be seen as regressive but rather as offering equality to lower-status individuals and recasting relationships of power as relationships of love. The book was generally well-reviewed upon release, with one reviewer observing that Ruden was the first classicist to treat Paul as a source on antiquity comparable to the poets and playwrights of ancient Greece and Rome.

== Background ==
Ruden has said that she grew up in a liberal Christian milieu in which, "while Paul was very important, he was no friend of women, and he was very harsh and authoritarian." Years later, after her conversion to Quakerism and the beginning of her career as a poet and classicist, she began to read the Pauline epistles in Greek and found that "once I had translated him, so to speak, I couldn't put him aside. . . . "There are certain things that he says that inhabit you. What he says about love, about God's commitment to individuals and to community—you can't really walk away and leave that behind." She also challenged the notion—advanced by Edward Gibbon—of a sharp divide between classical and sacred literature in scholarship, noting that "there isn't any logical reason for the separation." Ruden examines only the epistles whose Pauline authorship is uncontested: Romans, I and II Corinthians, Galatians, Philippians, I Thessalonians and Philemon.

== Synopsis ==
The book is divided into several chapters that examine different aspects of how Paul's message would have been received and understood in the pagan Roman Empire, with chapters on pleasure (2), homosexuality (3), women (4), the state (5) and slavery (6). In the first chapter, Ruden discusses her methodology. She describes a realization during a Bible study class in which a Pauline admonition against sorcery that induced sighs from modern readers but brought to her mind an image from Horace's poetry of a child buried alive and starved to death to produce a love charm. She believed this classical allusion demonstrates the cruel reputation of sorcery and fueled an insight that what Paul's writings meant to pagan Greek audiences likely is "as close as we can come to their basic original importance, as key documents (prior even to the gospels) inspiring the world-changing new movement, Christianity."

In chapter 2, Ruden rebuts modern conceptions of Paul as puritanical due to his views on fornication (Greek: πορνεία, porneia) and other sins such as idolatry and drunkenness highlighted in Paul's moral codes. (Ruden highlights the mercantile origins of the term porneia, "the essence [of which] was treating another human being as a thing.) She highlights several examples of the way these instructions correspond to moral failings in pagan culture. According to Ruden, "a Paul fed up with Greco-Roman culture is not at all hard to posit. Many Greeks and Romans were fed up too."

Chapter 3 addresses Paul's view of homosexuality, principally addressed in Romans 1. Ruden says the Greco-Roman world was rife with coercive homosexual behavior in which the passive partner was low-status and risked the loss of civic rights, adding that homosexual rape was considered divinely sanctioned. She describes the "ethics of homosexuality" of the Greeks and Romans as "twisted and doubled back", belying a modern "notion of a gay idyll" that comes from a Platonist "whitewash of pederasty in philosophical and religious terms." Ruden argues that Paul's deliberate word choices set both participants in gay sex on a moral par, not merely shaming the passive victims but emphasizing that all participants experience moral degradation and physical debilitation. "Such effects were unheard of among the Greeks and Romans when it came to active homosexuals," Ruden summarizes. "Paul takes a bold and effective swipe at the power structure."

The fourth chapter addresses Paul's views of women, with which Ruden claims "Paul has made his worst overall impressions on modern thinkers." However, comparing Paul's guidance on women speaking in church in I Corinthians 14 to the mocking and dismissive treatment of women in ekklesiae by Aristophanes and Juvenal, she notes that "it would not have been remarkable that women were forbidden to speak among the Christians. It's remarkable that they were speaking in the first place." Meanwhile, Paul's guidance on veils for women in I Corinthians 7 Ruden casts as "aimed toward an outrageous equality," in which all women in the church—slaves, freeborn, wives, unmarried, prostitutes—were instructed to wear the head coverings of respectable wives and widows. "What polytheistic literature can best add here is some context to show just how disturbing, how distracting to men and stigmatizing to women, the lack of a veil could be." Also in I Corinthians 7 is Paul's teaching on conjugal rights, which Ruden describes as both putting limits on male desire and licensing female sexual desire. "The demand for faithfulness now applied equally to both men and women—a real shocker."

Paul's teaching on obedience to governing authorities in Romans 13 is the subject of chapter 5. Connecting this teaching to Paul's recapitulation of the second greatest commandment in Romans 13 and his instruction to show "respect" and "honor" to leaders, she says Paul challenges his readers to "an even harder standard of love than in the familiar Old Testament and gospel commands to care for the weak." The Pauline epistles have been used by both opponents and defenders of slavery to justify the institution, and Ruden focuses on Philemon in chapter 6 to examine Paul's views in cultural context. The letter to Philemon discloses "a much more ambitious plan than making Onesimus legally free," she writes. "He wanted to make him into a human being. . . . He equates Onesimus with a son and a brother," thus overturning "what Greco-Roman society saw as the fundamental, insurmountable differences between a slave and his master." This posture, while not one of abolitionism, eventually weakened slavery to the point that it virtually disappeared in Europe. The concluding chapter is a meditation on Paul's teaching on love (Greek: ἀγάπη, agápē) in the famous passage of I Corinthians 13.

== Reception ==
Paul Among the People received largely favorable reviews. Reviewers praised Ruden's efforts to rehabilitate Paul's reputation. In National Review, John Wilson called the book "a sustained rebuke to lazy projections of modern sensibilities onto the ancient world." The Washington Post described the book as "a wholly fresh reinterpretation of Paul's most controversial writings." Reviewers also praised the book's contribution to understanding Paul's letters through ancient literature and their effects on ancient culture. Wilson said that Ruden, a prolific translator of classical texts, is the first to treat Paul as a source on antiquity comparable to Homer, Aristophanes, Virgil, Ovid and others.

However, in America John W. Martens criticized Ruden for insufficiently contextualizing Paul within Hellenistic Judaism. "By ignoring the Hellenistic Jewish context for Paul, she creates for herself once again a partially comprehensible Paul, somewhat better understood, but strangely disconnected from the world in which he lived," Martens wrote.
