= Adam Kotsko =

American writer and theologian (born 1980)

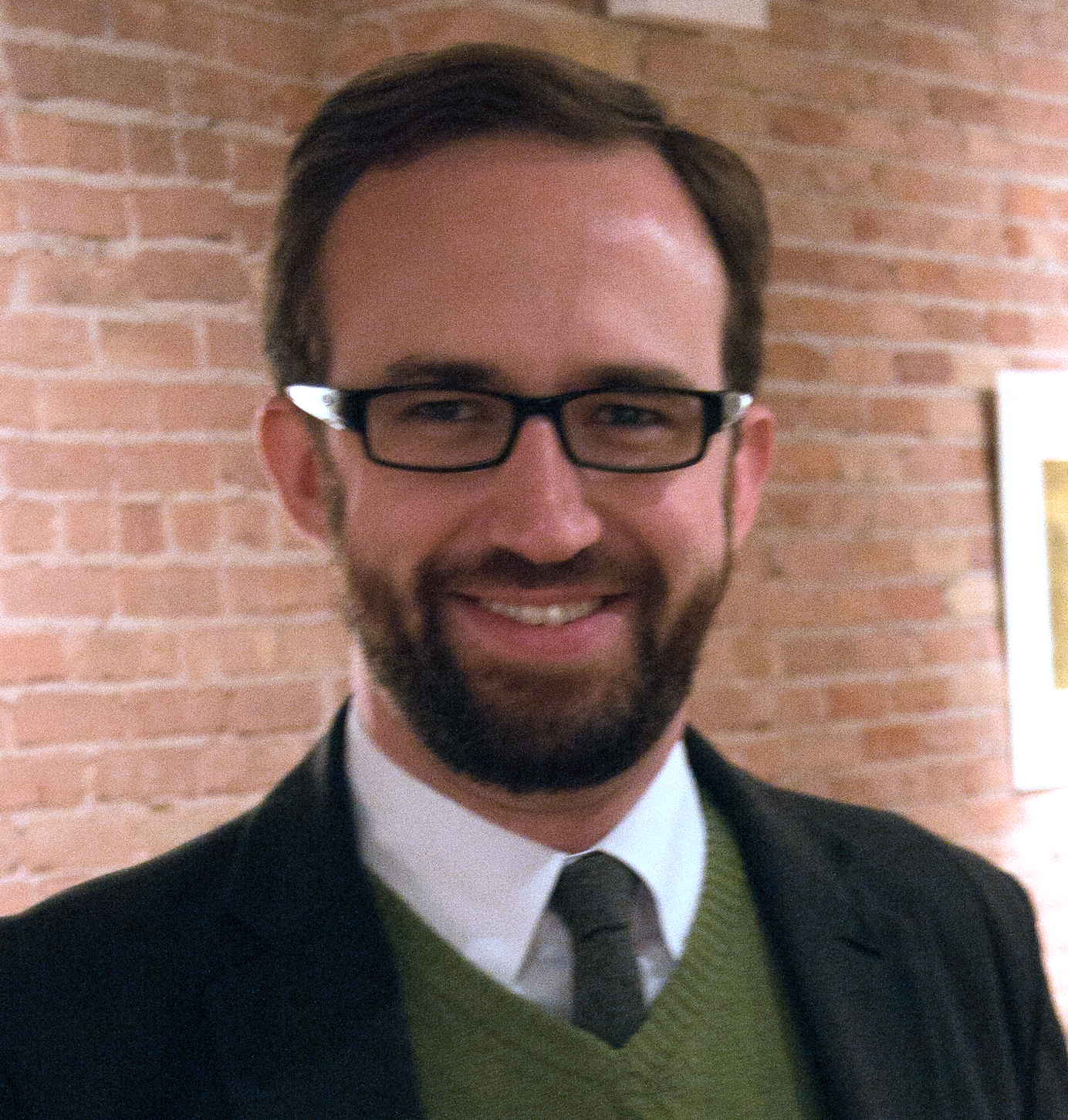
- Kotsko in 2011
- Born: July 19, 1980 (age 46); Flint, Michigan, US

Academic background
- Education: Olivet Nazarene University; Chicago Theological Seminary
- Thesis: Atonement and Ontology (2009)
- Doctoral advisor: Ted Jennings
- Influences: Giorgio Agamben; Dietrich Bonhoeffer; Jean-Luc Nancy; Friedrich Nietzsche; Dorothee Sölle; Slavoj Žižek

Academic work
- Discipline: Religious studies; theology
- Sub-discipline: Political theology
- Institutions: Shimer College; North Central College
- Website: adamkotsko.com

Adam Kotsko (born 1980) is an American theologian, religious scholar, culture critic, and translator, working in the field of political theology. He served as an Assistant Professor of Humanities at Shimer College in Chicago, which was absorbed into North Central College in 2017. He writes about philosophers Slavoj Žižek and Giorgio Agamben, as well as American pop culture.

== Early life and education ==
Adam Kotsko was born on July 19, 1980, in Flint, Michigan, and grew up in nearby Davison.

Kotsko earned his Bachelor of Arts degree at Olivet Nazarene University in Bourbonnais, Illinois, in 2002. From there, he went on to the Chicago Theological Seminary (CTS), where he completed a Master of Arts degree in religious studies in 2005, with a thesis in the form of a translation and commentary on Jacques Derrida's essay "Literature in Secret: An Impossible Filiation".

Kotsko completed his Doctor of Philosophy degree in theology, ethics, and culture at CTS in 2009. His doctoral dissertation was titled Atonement and Ontology. A modified version of his dissertation was published by Continuum International Publishing Group in 2010 under the title of The Politics of Redemption: The Social Logic of Salvation.

== Career ==
After completing his doctorate in 2009, Kotsko taught for two years at Kalamazoo College, a liberal arts college in Michigan. In 2011, Kotsko was hired by Shimer College, a small great-books college in Chicago.

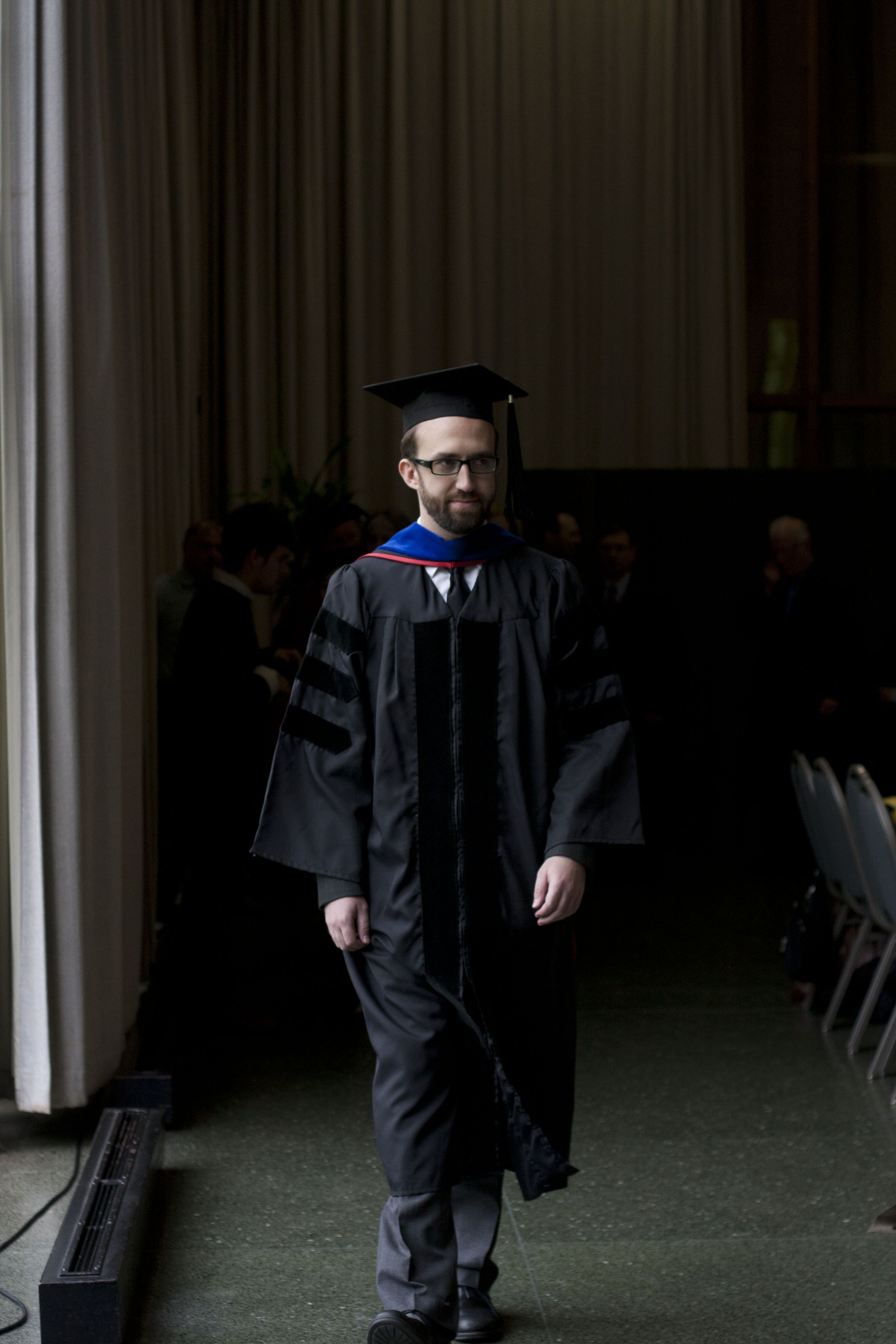
Kotsko at the Shimer College commencement ceremony in Chicago in May 2012

Kotsko has written on the philosopher Slavoj Žižek, including a 2008 book titled Žižek and Theology and a 2012 article in the Los Angeles Review of Books. His other works include The Politics of Redemption: The Social Logic of Salvation and a translation of Giorgio Agamben's The Sacrament of Language: An Archaeology of the Oath.

== Bibliography ==
Academic Monographs

- Late Star Trek: The Final Frontier in the Franchise Era (University of Minnesota Press, 2025).
- What is Theology? Christian Thought and Contemporary Life (Fordham University Press, 2021).
- Agamben’s Philosophical Trajectory (Edinburgh University Press, 2020).
- Neoliberalism’s Demons: On the Political Theology of Late Capitalism (Stanford University Press, 2018).
- The Prince of This World (Stanford University Press, 2016).
  - German translation: Der Fürst dieser Welt: Eine Genealogie des Teufels, trans. Florian Klug (Verlag Turia + Kant, 2019).
- Agamben’s Coming Philosophy: Finding a New Use for Theology, co-authored with Colby Dickinson (Rowman & Littlefield: 2015).
- Politics of Redemption: The Social Logic of Salvation (New York and London: Continuum/T&T Clark, 2010).
- Žižek and Theology (New York and London: Continuum/T&T Clark, 2008).

Trade Books

- Creepiness (New York and London: Zero Books, 2015).
- Why We Love Sociopaths: A Guide to Late Capitalist Television (New York and London: Zero Books, 2012).
  - Spanish translation: Por qué nos encantan los sociópatas, trans. Albert Fuentes (Melusina, 2016).
- Awkwardness (New York and London: Zero Books, 2010).

Edited Volume

- Agamben’s Philosophical Lineage, co-edited with Carlo Salzani (Edinburgh University Press, 2017).
