= Malachi (given name) =

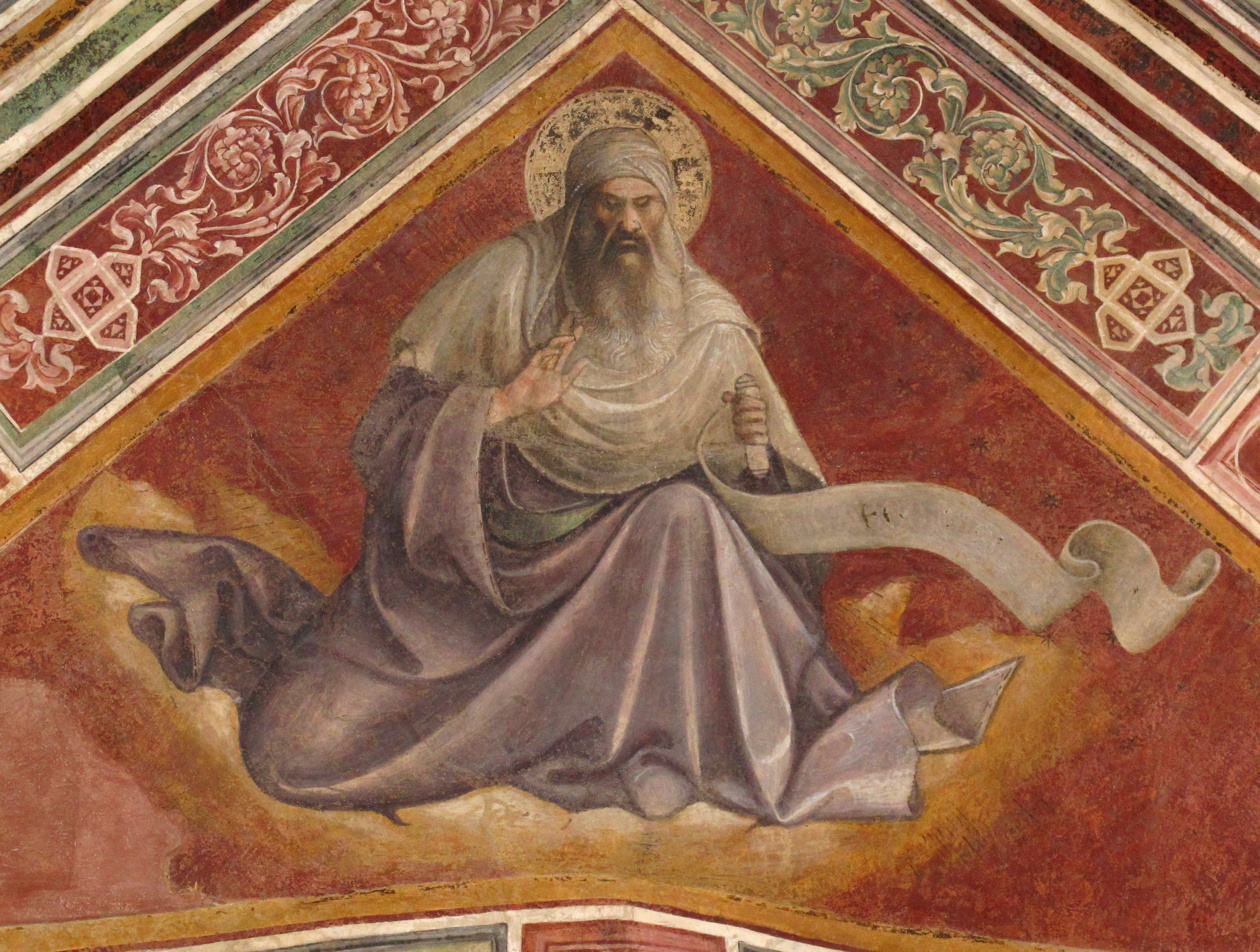
- Prophet Malachi
- Pronunciation: /ˈmæləkaɪ/
- Gender: Male

Origin
- Origin: Hebrew
- Meaning: "my messenger"
- Region of origin: Eretz Israel

Malachi is a male given name of Hebrew origin מַלְאָכִי (Malʾaḵī) meaning "my messenger". The name is popularized by the Jewish prophet Malachi in the Bible.

Notable people with this name include:

- Malachi ben Jacob HaKohen (1695/70?–1772), Talmudist, methodologist and Kaballist
- Malachi Bogdanov, British theatre director
- Malachi Curran, politician in Northern Ireland
- Malachi Cush (born 1980), Northern Irish singer/songwriter
- Malachi Davis (born 1977), American sprinter
- Malachi Dupre (born 1995), American football player
- Malachi Favors (1927–2004), American jazz bassist
- Malachi Fields (born 2002), American football player
- Malachi Flynn (born 1998), American basketball player
- Malachi Jones (clergyman) (c. 1651–1729), Anglo-Welsh clergyman and missionary
- Malachi Jones (cricketer) (born 1989), Bermudian cricketer
- Malachi Jones (footballer) (born 2003), Sierra Leonean footballer
- Malachi Jones (gridiron football) (born 1994), American football player
- Malachi Kittridge (1869-1928), American Major League Baseball catcher
- Malachi Kirby (born 1989), British actor and writer
- Malachi Lawrence (born 2003), American football player
- Malachi Leo Elliott (1886–1967), American architect
- Malachi Martin (1921–1999), Catholic priest, writer and commentator
- Malachi Martin (murderer) (c. 1831–1862), Irish-born Australian murderer
- Malachi Martin (politician) (1822–?), American politician
- Malachi Moore (born 2001), American football player
- Malachi Nelson (born 2004), American football player
- Malachi O'Doherty (born 1951), journalist, author and broadcaster in Northern Ireland
- Malachi Ritscher (1954–2006), American human rights and anti-war activist and musician
- Malachi Singleton (born 2004), American football player
- Malachi Thompson (1949–2006), American jazz trumpet player
- Malachi Throne (1928-2013), American actor
- Malachi Wideman (born 2001), American football player

== See also ==
- Malachy (given name)
- Malakia (Georgian: მალაქია), Georgian-language variant of the name
