= Dale Martin (scholar) =

American New Testament scholar (1954–2023)

Dale Basil Martin (July 26, 1954 – November 17, 2023) was an American New Testament scholar and historian of Christianity.

== Career ==
Martin joined the faculty of Yale University in 1999 and retired as the Woolsey Professor of Religious Studies in 2018. Before Yale, he was a faculty member at Rhodes College and Duke University.

Martin held degrees from Abilene Christian University, Princeton Theological Seminary, and Yale. He was elected a Fellow of the American Academy of Arts and Sciences in 2009.

In his historical analysis of the concept of superstition, Martin wrote that the term superstitio proliferated in the Roman empire as a term for religious heretics who spread "contagious" and "depraved" beliefs.

== Personal life ==
Dale was born on July 26, 1954 in Baytown, Texas, to Harold Kelly Martin, Jr. and Joan Watson Martin. Martin grew up in Texas and attended a fundamentalist church related to the Churches of Christ. He was a member of the Episcopal Church. Martin was openly gay. Dale Martin died on November 17, 2023, at 5:38 am at his home in Galveston, Texas, from cirrhosis of the liver.

== Bibliography ==
- Slavery as Salvation: The Metaphor of Slavery in Pauline Christianity. Yale University Press, US. 1990. ISBN 978-0300047356.
- The Corinthian Body. Yale University Press, US. 1995. ISBN 978-0300081725.
- Inventing Superstition: From the Hippocratics to the Christians. Yale University Press, US. 2004. ISBN 978-0674015340.
- Sex and the Single Savior: Gender and Sexuality in Biblical Interpretation. Westminster John Knox Press, US. 2006. ISBN 978-0664230463.
- Pedagogy of the Bible: An Analysis and Proposal. Westminster John Knox Press, US. 2008. ISBN 978-0664233068.
- New Testament History and Literature. Yale University Press, US. 2012. ISBN 978-0300182194.
- Biblical Truths: The Meaning of Scripture in the Twenty-first Century. Yale University Press, US. 2017. ISBN 978-0300227918.
