= Malacus (historian) =

Ancient Greek historian

Malacus (Ancient Greek: Μάλακος) was a Greek historian of the Hellenistic period, author of a local history of the island of Sifnos ("Sifnian Annals"), from which only a small fragment survives, quoted in the sixth book of Athenaeus's Deipnosophistae.

He claimed that Ephesus was founded by former slaves of the Samians: Initially, 1,000 of them rebelled against their masters, took refuge in the mountains, and from there continuously harassed the Samians. After six years of conflict, the Samians finally negotiated a peace and set them free, following the advice of an oracle. The former slaves then crossed to the opposite coast and founded Ephesus. However, this version of events by Malacus is not confirmed by other ancient sources.
