= South African Education and Environment Project =

South African Education and Environment Project is a non-profit organisation serving children and youth through educational support at every level of academic development. The organisation helps young people who are neglected by South Africa's education system.

== Beneficiaries ==
Philippi, the township community in which SAEP works, is a historically disadvantaged, under-resourced community. Like many townships in Cape Town, Philippi faces many social problems, including poor education, violent crime, substance abuse, environmental degradation and a rise in the number of residents with HIV/AIDS. It is a community which is severely impoverished, with the majority of residents living in informal wood and iron structures, typically without electricity or running water.

Schools in Philippi are often overcrowded, with low pass rates, and are under-resourced with few extra-curricular activities available to students. Nearly half of working-age people are unemployed and only 32% of the population (20 years & older) has completed secondary school (Grade 12) or higher. The average household income is R3,200 or less, indicating that many residents hold low income jobs or live on social grants. Successful graduates often move away from the township, leaving learners with few role models and little motivation to challenge local job seeking behaviours or believe that they can make something of themselves. Lack of information, networks and opportunities trap many into continued poverty and under-productivity.

== History ==
SAEP (USA) was founded in 1994 by Norton Tennille as a Cape Town based, US funded non-governmental organisation focusing on environmental education and awareness. In 1998, SAEP (USA) broadened its educational support activities to include after-school tutoring in core academic subject areas, including biology, mathematics, and English at Sinethemba Senior Secondary School in Philippi township, Cape Town.

In 2003, SAEP (USA) and Jane Keen, a South African social worker, teamed up to form SAEP (SA), a sister organisation which was registered as a community-based South African Non-Profit Organisation that year and two years later became a registered Public Benefit Organisation. The same year, the Bridging Year Programme was started which aimed to assist school leavers in improving their English, developing computer skills and exploring career alternatives.

Under the leadership of Jane Keen, SAEP began working with a cluster of ten educare centres to help them improve infrastructure, develop financial and administrative skills, and register with the Department of Social Development and Education.

Arts had been a part of SAEP's high school programme in the form of poetry workshops since 2000, but in 2005 it became a programme in its own right. Visual arts, drama, photography and film were added that year, and music and other activities in subsequent years.

In 2009 SAEP moved its high school academic programme from Grades 11 and 12 to Grade 9 with its launch of the Hope Scholars Programme, a holistic tutoring and mentoring programme designed to begin in Grade 9 and follow the learners through Grade 12. The same year SAEP also launched, in partnership with ADT Security, the ADT teach Programme, a three-year computer training programme designed to provide township learners in three high schools with IT skills necessary for the job market and for tertiary studies.

Tertiary support was provided on an ad hoc basis from the time that the first Bridging Year students applied and were accepted to university. This was formalized in 2010 with the launch of the Tertiary Support Programme.

Since 2006, SAEP had had a vision of creating a research and development hub or "think-and-do" tank but lacked funding for it. In 2011 it became a reality with a small three-year grant from the National Lottery. It grew considerably in 2013 thanks to funding from the STARS Foundation Impact Award for Education.

SAEP recognized the importance of academic and career counseling at an early stage, and began a formal programme when it cofounded Inkanyezi in collaboration with its UCT partner organization TeachOut. In 2013, SAEP's social worker, who has experience and expertise in career counseling, developed this programme which has a focus on capacity building for high school life orientation teachers.

== Awards ==
SAEP was awarded an 'impact award' by the international STARS Foundation in both 2012 and 2013. In 2012 SAEP received the regional runner-up award for excellent service provision and effective management. In 2013 SAEP received the 2013 Stars Runner Up Award for Education in Africa / Middle East. The Stars Awards recognize and reward effective, well-managed local organisations working to improve child health, education, protection and WASH (water, sanitation and hygiene) in the countries with the highest under-five child mortality.

Also in 2012, SAEP's Early Childhood Development Programme received a national Impumelelo Innovation Award for its replicable model and track record of poverty impact. The same year, Jane Keen, SAEP Director, was named one of the three national Education Finalists for the Shoprite Checkers Women of the Year Award in recognition of her lifelong commitment to improving the lives of marginalized children.

In 2008, SAEP's Early Childhood Development Programme won an ABSA/Sowetan award as runner up Western Cape Resource Training Organization of the Year. Also in 2008, SAEP (USA)'s founder, Norton Tennille, won the national Inyathelo Award for Exceptional Philanthropy for his groundbreaking work in education in the schools of Philippi and neighbouring townships.

== SAEP's Vision and Mission ==
SAEP's vision is "A generation of motivated South African youth, equipped with education and life skills in order to maximise their potential, and contribute to society.

SAEP's mission is "To prepare and motivate children and youth from under-resourced communities to thrive by providing education, life skills and psycho-social support" through its learning programmes.

== SAEP’s Objectives ==
SAEP's overall organizational objectives are:

- To increase access to quality early childhood education in township communities;
- To significantly improve academic achievement in township high schools;
- To expand the horizons of, build the confidence of, and empower township youth through career guidance and enrichment programmes;
- To enhance the likelihood of tertiary entrance and retention among township youth and to improve tertiary graduation rates among these youth;
- To share knowledge and collaborate with other organisations working for change in South African education, and together advocate for improved service delivery in the sector.

== SAEP Programmes (from 2019) ==
SAEP employs a community-driven approach. All the programmes have developed in response to specific needs expressed by learners, teachers or principals in the Philippi community. The offerings include:

- The Early Childhood Development Programme, works with under-resourced centres in Philippi through centre capacitation and compliance in order for them to be recognised and be registered by the Department of Social Development. The ECD Programme help the educare centres develop into sustainable, quality education providers through long-term mentoring relationships, ongoing staff training, provision of educational materials and guidance, and infrastructural and nutritional support. This impacts 0 to 5-year-old children.
- The Hope Scholars Programme, helps Grade 8 and 9 learners transition into secondary school through extended experiential learning, career guidance, and mentoring & enrichment activities. This impacts trades 8 and 9 learners from partner schools.
- The Bridging Year Programme, prepares promising recent matriculants for success in tertiary education through intensive tutoring on 21st century skills, critical thinking, career advisement, and life orientation. The programme also provides leadership training, computer and digital literacy skills and psycho-social support. This impacts post-matric students, all of whom are from under-resourced schools. SAEP has partnered with the Cape Peninsula University of Technology (CPUT) Second Chance Programme for the students' subject rewrite of their previous matric results.
- The Tertiary Support Programme, which provides psycho-social counselling, financial support and professional career mentorship to promote tertiary retention and ensure success and completion in higher education.

Prior to 2019, SAEP also ran the following programmes, but the programmes were terminated due to insufficient funding:

- The ADT Teach Programme, which uses innovative mobile computer labs to teach advanced computerskills to secondary school learners in grades 10–12. This used to be, in majority, funding by ADT Tyco South Africa.
- The Arts Outreach Programme, which runs after-school workshops for primary and secondary school learners in a variety of artistic disciplines, including creative writing, visual art, drama, dance, and music, and takes participating learners on cultural excursions.
- The Environmental Education Programme, which runs after-school environmental awareness clubs for secondary school learners.
- The Career Connections Programme, which trains Life Orientation teachers in career guidance, supports schools to develop career resource libraries, and provides direct career guidance to Grade 9 and 11 learners with the help of trained peer mentors.

== The Impact Centre: Monitoring & Evaluation, and the Impact Centre Consulting ==
SAEP has an Impact Centre, a research and development hub, which supports and develops the educational programmes and contributes to the broader conversation on education in South Africa. The Impact Centre is also responsible for the monitoring and evaluation reporting for the entire organisation. In 2016, SAEP established the Impact Centre Consulting, its sustainability arm to help generate unrestricted income revenue stream for the organisation by developing monitoring and evaluation modules for small to medium size organisations using cloud-based CRM, Salesforce.
