= John F. Boyle, Jr. =

American doctor and convicted murderer (1943–2026)

John Francis Boyle, Jr.
- Born: May 1, 1943; Philadelphia, Pennsylvania, U.S.
- Died: April 18, 2026 (aged 82); Marion Correctional Institution, Marion, Ohio, U.S.
- Spouse: Noreen Marie Schmid (m. 1968; died 1989)
- Children: 3
- Convictions: Aggravated murder Abuse of a corpse
- Penalty: 21-and-a-half years to life

Details
- Victims: 1
- Date: December 31, 1989
- Location: Mansfield, Ohio

John Francis Boyle, Jr. (May 1, 1943 – April 18, 2026), also known as Jack Boyle, was an American osteopathic doctor from Mansfield, Ohio, who, in 1990, was convicted of the first-degree murder of his wife, Noreen. His case became highly publicized due to the nature of the crime—that he suffocated his wife, bludgeoned her with a hammer, and then entombed her body underneath the basement of a home he owned in Erie, Pennsylvania.

== Early life and education ==
John Francis Boyle, Jr. was born in Philadelphia, Pennsylvania, on May 1, 1943, to John Francis Boyle, Sr. and Christine Boyle. To friends and family, he was known by the nickname "Jack." He was of Irish descent on his father's side and Italian descent on his mother's, and he reportedly grew up poor. He served in the Navy, where he told stories of being a fighter pilot and reconnoiterer; none of these stories were true. When he was 19 years old, he met his future wife Noreen Marie Boyle (née Schmid), then 16, at a drive-in diner. The two of them began dating, and subsequently married in 1968; later, they both attended the University of Pennsylvania, where he graduated with a Bachelor of Arts in 1973. Jack attended the Philadelphia College of Osteopathic Medicine, earning a Doctor of Osteopathy degree in 1977, while Noreen was a student at the University of Pennsylvania's dental school and aspired to become a dentist. Noreen soon found work as a dental hygienist, and she supported Jack through medical school, where his specialty was osteopathy. The couple resided in various places, including Philadelphia, Pensacola, Florida, and Dahlgren, Virginia, before finally settling in Mansfield, Ohio. The two had a son, Collier Landry Boyle, on February 28, 1978, and, in 1989, they adopted a three-year-old Taiwanese girl named Elizabeth.

The Boyles lived a seemingly happy life when they settled in Mansfield; Jack had opened his own medical practice in the town, which was thriving, and Noreen was by then a stay-at-home mother and socialite beloved by many in the town. However, behind closed doors, there was trouble in the home. Jack was reportedly abusive to his family, especially his young son, Collier, whom he would often refer to—and force to refer to himself—as a "faggot" and "a stupid little fat boy." Collier described him as a "rage-aholic" who would fly into temper tantrums over trivial matters and direct it towards his family. Jack also had numerous extramarital affairs, which his wife Noreen was apparently privy to, but tolerated for the sake of ensuring that their son Collier, and later their daughter Elizabeth, did not grow up in a broken home.

A few months before the murder, Collier was introduced to one of Jack's mistresses, Sherri Lee Campbell, then 26 years old. Unbeknownst to Collier, Campbell was pregnant with his father's child. Jack told his young son that the woman was merely a friend of his; however, after Collier noticed that Campbell was wearing a distinctive bespoke ring belonging to his mother, and after he witnessed them kissing, he realized she was his father's girlfriend and informed his mother. Noreen, infuriated over her husband involving their son in his infidelities, promptly filed for divorce. During the divorce proceedings, one month before the murder, while sitting in the parking lot of a Bob Evans restaurant, Noreen reportedly told her son, "If anything happens to me, your father did it."

== Murder of Noreen Boyle ==
On December 30, 1989, Jack's mother, Christine, arrived to the Boyle house to spend some time with the family for New Years. Noreen Boyle was on the phone with a friend of hers, where she reportedly remarked, "Well, it looks like Jack isn't going to murder me tonight—his mother is staying over." Hauntingly, this was Noreen's last statement ever recorded before her disappearance.

Later that night, on December 31, at around 3 a.m., Collier, 11, awoke to having heard a scream, followed by two loud 'thuds' coming from the master bedroom. Elizabeth, 3, who was sleeping in bed with her mother, would later report that she witnessed her father bludgeon her mother. The following morning, Collier emerged from his bedroom and encountered his father, who was sitting on the sofa in the living room. Upon Collier questioning him as to where his mother was, Jack Boyle responded, "Mommy went on a little vacation." He told Collier that they were not going to the police, and he, along with his mother Christine, instructed Collier not to do so; threatening him with punishment if he disobeyed.

Collier, disbelieving of his father's version of events and determined to find out what happened to his mother, went upstairs to his room and retrieved a list of his mother's contacts which he had hidden inside a Garfield the Cat stuffed toy; he phoned all of them and informed them of the sounds he had heard last night and Noreen's disappearance, convinced that his mother had been murdered. He instructed her friends to call 911 in his place, which one of them did, sparking the investigation.

=== Investigation into Noreen's disappearance ===
Mansfield Police Lieutenant David "Dave" Messmore and his team of investigators "in lab coats" arrived at the Boyle home on January 1, 1990. Jack Boyle's story was that he and his wife had gotten into an argument, and after she had thrown a pile of credit cards at him, left—without her purse or said credit cards—in an unknown car parked in the driveway of their home. This incident supposedly occurred at around 10 P.M. on December 30, but a neighbor who was awake at the time contradicted this claim, stating that he did not see any unknown car parked at the Boyle residence, nor did he witness anybody drive away from the Boyle residence around that time. Christine Boyle presumed that Collier had been the one to call authorities, and she admonished him for it. Both she and her son Jack were hostile towards police speaking to Collier and shielded him from law enforcement. Despite these efforts, Messmore quickly became a confidante for Collier, with Collier often placing calls to him and meeting with him in secret, divulging to him his suspicions for the duration of the case, and pointing him towards evidence he had found, such as pictures of his father and Sherri Campbell in Jack's Erie home that he had uncovered in his father's glove compartment. Jack Boyle accused Messmore of "manipulating" his son.

Investigators uncovered key evidence during the investigation, including the rental of a jackhammer from a local business in Mansfield conducted two days before Noreen's disappearance; the purchase of a home in Erie, Pennsylvania, during which the realtor noted that the woman accompanying Boyle during the signing of the purchase agreement did not resemble Noreen and had signed her name as "N. Sherri Boyle," that Boyle made many suspicious inquiries about the property, including the possibility of lowering the basement floor "so that [Collier] could play basketball," and that Boyle had insisted on the seller's vacancy of the home by 1 January; Boyle's daily trips to Erie; testimony that Collier had to rub Ben-Gay liniment on his father's strained muscles following one such trip; concrete detritus found on property belonging to Sherri Campbell's uncle, and witness testimony that Boyle had been observed on the man's property; and testimony from a contractor renovating the Erie home that despite exceedingly cold temperatures in Pennsylvania, Boyle was insistent on keeping his basement windows open.

=== Discovery of Noreen's body ===
A warrant was issued to search Boyle's Erie home on January 25, 1990, after Collier Boyle phoned Messmore and informed him that Jack had told him he was taking him to Florida, and implied that he "might not make it back alive" from that trip. It was around this time that Sherri Campbell gave birth to her and Jack Boyle's daughter. Messmore and other officers descended upon the house and began the search, starting immediately with the basement.

Green carpeting had been laid on the floor, over newly-painted gray flooring, and a shelf stood halfway-built in a corner. Officers demolished the shelf and removed the carpet, and an officer noted that a portion of the floor—despite being coated with fresh concrete—was unusually soft and sedimented. The officers took a shovel and excavated the area, and after about three hours, they unearthed a nude female body wrapped in green tarp and a plastic bag around her head. The woman wore a custom Rolex watch with Noreen Boyle's initials engraved on it, which had stopped on December 31—indicating the date of death. DNA tests after a secondary exhumation positively identified the woman as Noreen Boyle. The autopsy confirmed she had died of suffocation, while having antecedently suffered blunt force trauma to her head. John Boyle was subsequently arrested and charged with first-degree murder.

== Trial and conviction ==
The trial of John Boyle took place in June 1990. Prosecutor James Mayer, Jr. spearheaded the trial. The prosecution's key witness was Collier Boyle, who testified about the sounds he heard on the night of his mother's disappearance, his father's suspicious remarks following the incident, and his father's prior abusive behavior and extramarital relationships. Boyle later took the stand and testified in his own defense, contending that he did not murder Noreen, and that somebody else must have done so and planted the evidence in his home. He stuck to his story that his wife left in an unknown car after an argument. The jury found Boyle guilty of first-degree murder and felony abuse of a corpse, and sentenced him to life imprisonment without the possibility of parole for twenty years, consecutive to an 18-month term for abusing a corpse. He was incarcerated at the Marion Correctional Institution in Marion, Ohio until his death on April 18, 2026.

The John Boyle murder trial captivated Mansfield, Ohio, becoming a significant part of local history. It drew extensive media coverage, akin to a soap opera, with the community closely following each development. This attention reflected the trial's impact on the collective consciousness and discussions within Mansfield, underscoring the profound effect of high-profile legal cases on small communities. It became the second most publicized case in Ohio history, after the 1954 case of Sam Sheppard – coincidentally also involving an osteopath accused of murdering his wife.

== Appeal ==
On June 2, 1994, John Boyle appealed for habeas corpus relief, citing insufficient evidence, denial of corpse examination by defense experts, prosecutorial misconduct, and ineffective assistance of counsel. The court affirmed the district court's denial of the writ, finding the evidence sufficient and the claims of trial and prosecutorial errors unfounded, thereby upholding Boyle's conviction.

== Parole hearings ==
On December 6, 2010, the Parole Board denied parole for Boyle's first hearing stating, "Release at this time would not further the interest of justice and would demean the seriousness of the brutal crime."

On December 2, 2020, the Parole Board denied parole for Boyle's second hearing stating, "There is substantial reason to believe that due to the serious nature of the crime, the release of the inmate into society would create undue risk to the public safety, or that due to the serious nature of the crime, the release of the inmate would not further the interest of justice or be consistent with the welfare and security of society."

On August 20, 2025, the Parole Board denied parole for Boyle's third hearing citing "unique elements of the offense", community opposition, and Boyle's "lack of insight" into the degree of victimization."

== Death ==
Boyle died on April 18, 2026, at the age of 82 after being transferred to a medical facility in Columbus from the Marion Correctional Institution.

== Collier Landry ==
Collier Landry Boyle, now known simply as Collier Landry, moved to Los Angeles, California and became a musician, photographer, filmmaker, cinematographer, documentarian, spokesman, author, and podcaster. He created a documentary about his ordeal in 2017 entitled 'A Murder In Mansfield' with two-time Oscar-winning director Barbara Kopple, which aired on Investigation Discovery. Before moving to Los Angeles, he was a music major at the Ohio University School of Music and the Oberlin Conservatory, but dropped out. He is an inductee into the International Cinematographers Guild and the founder of Don't Touch My Radio, an independent commercial production company. He directed the music video for Macy Gray's 'Stop, Drop, Roll.'

He has appeared on various programs to tell his story, including TEDx and Dr. Phil, and he has been featured in various publications, including Variety, The New York Times, Esquire, USA Today, and The Daily Mail. He runs his own YouTube channel where he hosts the podcasts 'Moving Past Murder' and 'The Collier Landry Show,' in which he discusses various topics, such as trauma and what it's like to be a trauma survivor, and his own experiences growing up in an abusive and dysfunctional family under the reign of a narcissist and sociopath, and weighs in on other true crime cases and commiserates with other survivors. He frequently reviews information relating to his own case, such as interviewing the judge who presided over his father's trial and reading his father's letters to him from prison. He previously hosted 'Survivor Squad,' a collaborative podcast with "Dirty" John Meehan survivor Terra Newell; the two were also in a romantic relationship. He was featured on 'Coptales & Cocktails,' a podcast hosted by former Sergeant Sean "Sticks" Larkin, and on Soft White Underbelly.

Landry has been open about his previous struggles with substance abuse, psychiatric institutionalization, guilt over sending his father to prison and filial piety, and abandonment by both sides of his family; his father's side for "betraying" his father, his mother's side because he physically resembled his father in appearance. Lt. David Messmore, the policeman who helped Collier solve his mother's murder, had filed a petition for him and his wife to formally adopt the young Collier; however this petition was denied, with the judge citing conflict of interest. Landry was subsequently put in foster care and adopted by a foster family.

He has no contact with either his adoptive sister, Elizabeth—whom he has not seen since 1990 and was later adopted out—and has sporadic contact with his half-sister by his father and Sherri Lee Campbell. He currently resides in Santa Monica, California.

== Media coverage ==
=== A Murder in Mansfield ===
"A Murder in Mansfield" is a documentary that centers on Collier Landry, who grapples with the aftermath of his mother Noreen Boyle's murder by his father, Dr. John Boyle. The film chronicles Landry's journey of confronting his past, his testimony against his father, and his quest for healing and understanding. Through Landry's personal story, the documentary addresses broader themes of justice, the impact of crime on families, and the path to forgiveness.

=== Moving Past Murder ===
"Moving Past Murder" is a podcast created by Collier Landry that delves into his experiences following the murder of his mother, Noreen Boyle, by his father, Dr. John Boyle, in 1989. The podcast serves as both a personal therapeutic journey for Landry and a support platform for listeners navigating similar traumas, emphasizing resilience and the process of healing from profound betrayal.

=== Other media ===
The Boyle murder case was featured on various true crime programs, including Forensic Files ('Foundation of Lies,' season 5, episode 12), The New Detectives ('Material Witness,' season 8, episode 3), and Oxygen's A Plan To Kill (season 1, episode 8).
