= Tat-Siong Benny Liew =

American academic and New Testament scholar

Tat-Siong Benny Liew is an American New Testament scholar. He is the Class of 1956 Professor in New Testament Studies at the College of the Holy Cross.

== Biography ==
Liew obtained his B.A. and M.A. from Olivet Nazarene University and completed a Ph.D. in New Testament from Vanderbilt University. He taught New Testament at Chicago Theological Seminary and Pacific School of Theology and, in Autumn 2013, took up the 1956 Chair of New Testament Studies in the religious studies department of College of the Holy Cross.

Much of his scholarship is around New Testament studies, related to the gospels, and for promoting Asian American biblical hermeneutics.

== Controversy ==
In 2018, the Holy Cross' conservative alternative newspaper, the Fenwick Review, published extracts of Liew's scholarship which suggested that Jesus had "queer desires." Though this was seen as controversial, given that Holy Cross is a Jesuit institution, Liew was defended by the president Philip Boroughs on the basis of academic freedom. A petition of 14,000 signatures followed asking for Liew's dismissal. An open letter written by Robert J. McManus, the Catholic bishop of Worcester, declared Liew's views blasphemous and stated that "academic freedom… particularly in the fields of theology or religious studies, cannot provide cover for blatantly unorthodox teaching." Holy Cross ignored the bishop.

== Selected works ==
- Liew, Tat-Siong Benny (1999). Politics of Parousia: Reading Mark Inter(Con)Textually. Leiden: Brill. ISBN 978-90-04-11360-2.
- Liew, Tat-Siong Benny (2008). What Is Asian American Biblical Hermeneutics?: Reading the New Testament. University of Hawaii Press. ISBN 978-0-8248-3162-2.
- Liew, Tat-Siong Benny, ed. (2009). Postcolonial Interventions: Essays in Honor of R.S. Sugirtharajah. Sheffield: Sheffield Phoenix Press. ISBN 978-1-906055-70-7.
- Bailey, Randall C.; Liew, Tat-Siong Benny; Segovia, Fernando F., eds. (2009). They Were All Together in One Place?: Toward Minority Biblical Criticism. Society of Biblical Lit. ISBN 978-1-58983-245-9.
- Liew, Tat-Siong Benny, ed. (2011). Reading Ideologies: Essays on the Bible and Interpretation in Honor of Mary Ann Tolbert. Sheffield: Sheffield Phoenix Press. ISBN 978-1-907534-27-0.
- Liew, Tat-siong Benny; Runions, Erin, eds. (2016). Psychoanalytic Mediations between Marxist and Postcolonial Reading of the Bible. SBL Press. ISBN 978-0-88414-166-2.
- Liew, Tat-siong Benny; Segovia, Fernando F., eds. (2018). Colonialism and the Bible: Contemporary Reflections from the Global South. Lexington Books. ISBN 978-1-4985-7276-7.
