= Malakia =

Malakia (Georgian: მალაქია) is a Georgian masculine given name, a variant of Malachi. People with the name include:

- Giorgi-Malakia Abashidze or George V of Imereti (died 1722), Georgian nobleman
- Malakia II (Catholicos of Abkhazia) (died 1639), Catholicos of Abkhazia, also Malakia I Gurieli
- Malakia II Gurieli ( fl. 1660–1703), Prince of Guria
