= Malakas =

Profane Greek slang

Malakas (Greek: μαλάκας [maˈlakas]) is a commonly used profane Greek slang word, with a variety of different meanings, but literally meaning "man who masturbates". While it is typically used as an insult, with its literal equivalent in Commonwealth English being "wanker” and “jerk off” in American English, the meaning varies depending on the tone and context used. It can be an exclamation of pleasure, an expression of dark horror, a cry of anger, a declaration of affection, and other different things. Common alternative meanings include "asshole", "motherfucker", "jerk", or "idiot", and the contrasting "dude", or "mate", depending on the context. It has been described as "the most used Greek slang word".

== Overview ==
Malakas derives from the Greek word malakos (μαλακός), which means "soft" or "spoilt, well-used to luxuries of life". It is one of the most frequent words picked up by tourists (often in its vocative case form, i.e. μαλάκα malaka [maˈlaka]) and travelers to Greece and is not unusual among the younger Greek diaspora, even when the level of Greek is low. While "malakas" is a strictly masculine noun, a female form of the word exists, malako (μαλάκω), but is a recent coinage and not as widely used, whereas malakismeni (μαλακισμένη) seems to be rather more vintage, but also more common, though this form is only used as a slur. In everyday speech, the word malakas is often used as a synonym of idiot. While the term is inappropriate and is traditionally used as a slur, it is acceptable and very commonly used among close friends, especially males, where it takes on a meaning similar to "dude" or "mate". Malakas is very rarely used in its literal meaning (man who masturbates).

== Malakia ==
Malakia, literally meaning masturbation, is often also used in a similar sense as malakas to refer to nonsense, something worthless or of poor quality, or a mistake. It can also be used literally. The use of malakia to mean "masturbation" traces back to medieval Greek. It is used in this sense in the Life of Saint Andrew the Fool and in the Life of Saint Niphon, both of which date to the tenth century.

In ancient Greek, Malakia (μαλακία, "softness", "weakliness") meant moral weakness or "effeminacy". The contrary characteristic was karteria (καρτερία, "patient endurance", "perseverance").

The verb "malakizome" (μαλακίζομαι) also exists. Even though its literal meaning is "I masturbate" it is mostly used to define that someone is wasting his time or failing to achieve something.

== See also ==
- Bæddel and bædling
