= Christianity and sexual orientation =

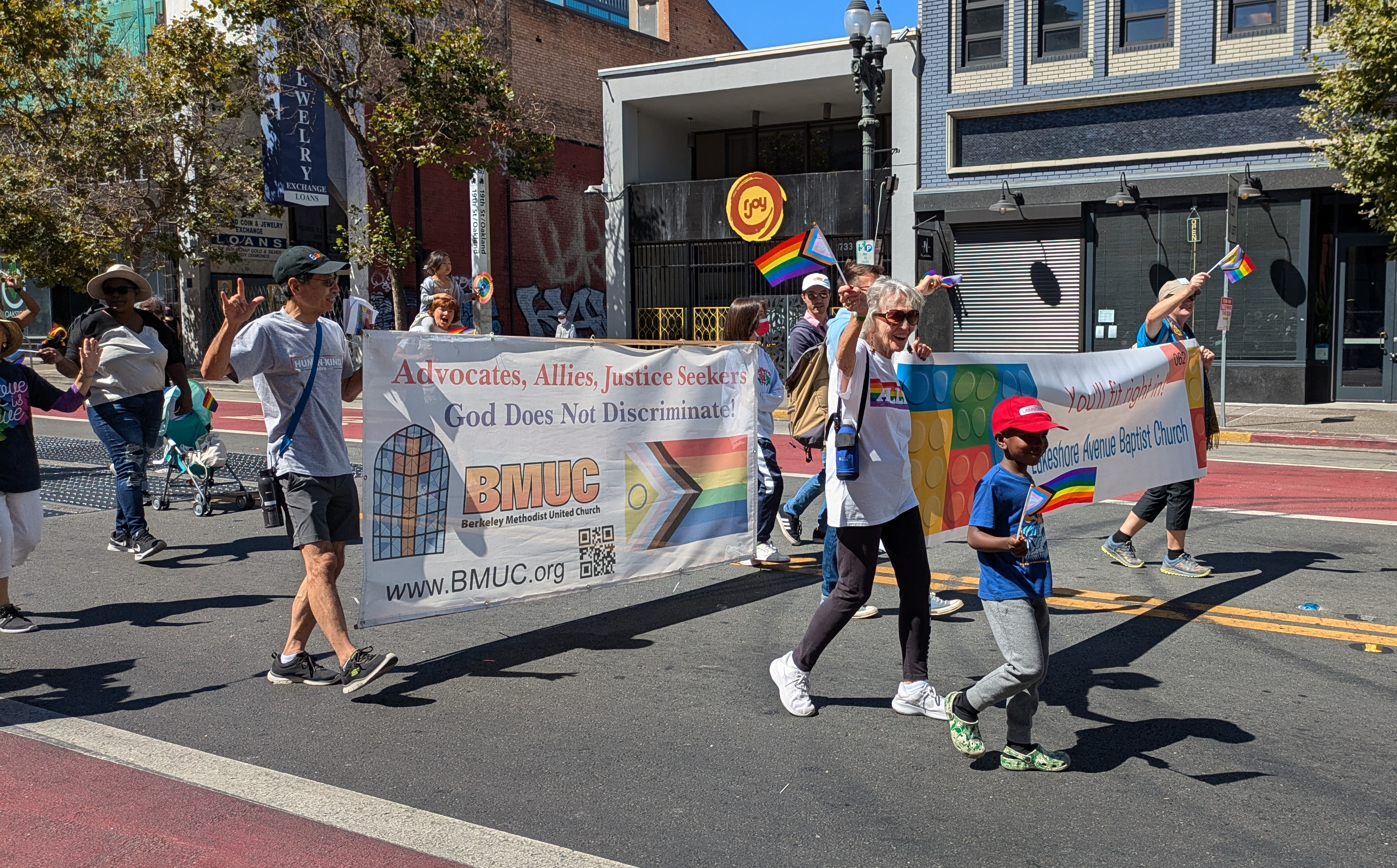
Christian churches represented at a pride parade in Oakland, California, United States

Christian denominations have a variety of beliefs about sexual orientation, including beliefs about same-sex sexual practices. Denominations differ in the way they treat lesbian, bisexual, gay, or queer people; variously, such people may be barred from membership, accepted as laity, or ordained as clergy, depending on the denomination.

== Beliefs and mythology ==
The history of Christianity and homosexuality has been much debated. The Hebrew Bible and its traditional interpretations in Judaism and Christianity have historically affirmed and endorsed a patriarchal and heteronormative approach towards human sexuality, favouring exclusively penetrative vaginal intercourse between men and women within the boundaries of marriage over all other forms of human sexual activity, including autoeroticism, masturbation, oral sex, non-penetrative and non-heterosexual sexual intercourse (all of which have been labeled as "sodomy" at various times), believing and teaching that such behaviors are forbidden because they're considered sinful, and further compared to or derived from the behavior of the alleged residents of Sodom and Gomorrah. However, the status of LGBTQ people in early Christianity is debated. Throughout the majority of Christian history, most Christian theologians and denominations have considered homosexual behavior as immoral or sinful.

=== Biblical ===
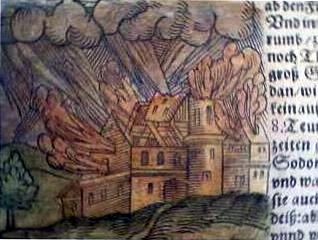
The destruction of Sodom as illustrated by Sebastian Münster (1564)

Following the lead of Yale scholar John Boswell, it has been argued that a number of early Christians (such as Saints Sergius and Bacchus) entered into homosexual relationships, and that certain Biblical figures had homosexual relationships, despite Biblical injunctions against sexual relationships between members of the same sex. Examples cited are Ruth and her mother-in-law Naomi, Daniel and the court official Ashpenaz, and, most famously, David and King Saul's son Jonathan.

The story of David and Jonathan has been described as "biblical Judeo-Christianity's most influential justification of homoerotic love". The relationship between David and Jonathan is mainly covered in the Old Testament First Book of Samuel, as part of the story of David's ascent to power. The mainstream view found in modern biblical exegesis argues that the relationship between the two is merely a close platonic friendship. However, a few have interpreted the love between David and Jonathan as romantic or sexual. Although David was married (to many women), he articulates a distinction between his relationship with Jonathan and the bonds he shares with women.

Another biblical hero, Noah, best known for his building an ark to save animals and worthy people from a divinely caused flood, later became a wine-maker. One day he drank too much wine, and fell asleep naked in his tent. When his son Ham entered the tent, he saw his father naked, and his son, Canaan was cursed with banishment and possibly slavery. In Jewish tradition, it is also suggested that Ham had anal sex with Noah or castrated him.

=== Saints ===
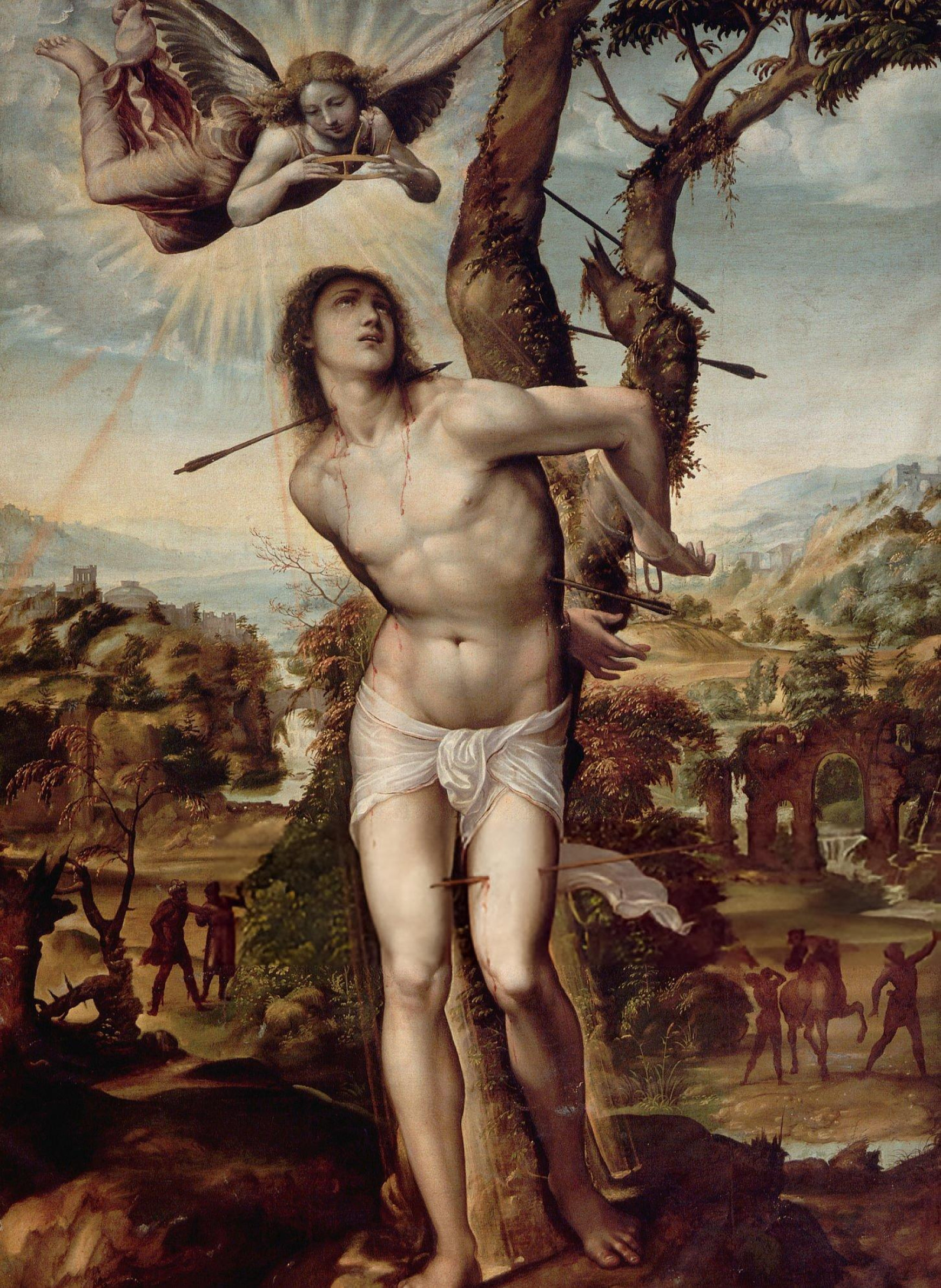
Saint Sebastian, considered by some to be the world's first LGBTQ icon

While highly controversial, attempts have been made to hold up certain Christian saints as positive examples of homosexuality in Church history:

- Saints Sergius and Bacchus: Sergius and Bacchus's close relationship has led some modern commentators to believe they were lovers. The most popular evidence for this view is that the oldest text of their martyrology, in the Greek language, describes them as "erastai", or lovers. Historian John Boswell considered their relationship to be an example of an early Christian same-sex union, reflecting his contested view of tolerant early Christians attitudes toward homosexuality. The official stance of the Eastern Orthodox Church is that the ancient Eastern tradition of adelphopoiia, which was done to form a "brotherhood" in the name of God, and is traditionally associated with these two saints, had no sexual implications.
- Saints Cosmas and Damian: A difficulty with this assertion is that most hagiographies list these saints as natural brothers or twins.
- Saint Sebastian has been called the world's first gay icon. The combination of his strong, shirtless physique, the symbolism of the arrows penetrating his body, and the look on his face of rapturous pain have intrigued artists for centuries, and began the first explicitly gay cult in the 19th century. Richard A. Kaye wrote, "contemporary gay men have seen in Sebastian at once a stunning advertisement for homosexual desire (indeed, a homoerotic ideal), and a prototypical portrait of tortured closet case."

=== Eunuchs ===
The extent and even the existence of religious castration among Christians, with members of the early church castrating themselves for religious purposes, is subject to debate. The early theologian Origen found scriptural justification for the practice in Matthew 19:12, where Jesus says, "For there are eunuchs who have been so from birth, and there are eunuchs who have been made eunuchs by others, and there are eunuchs who have made themselves eunuchs for the sake of the kingdom of heaven. Let anyone accept this who can." (NRSV)

In describing Jesus as a spado and Paul of Tarsus as a castratus in his book De Monogamia, Tertullian, a 2nd-century Church Father, used Latin words that denoted eunuchs to refer to virginity and continence.

The significance of the selection of the Ethiopian eunuch as being the first gentile convert has been discussed as representative of the inclusion of a sexual minority in the context of the time.

== Specific sexual orientations ==
=== Homosexuality ===
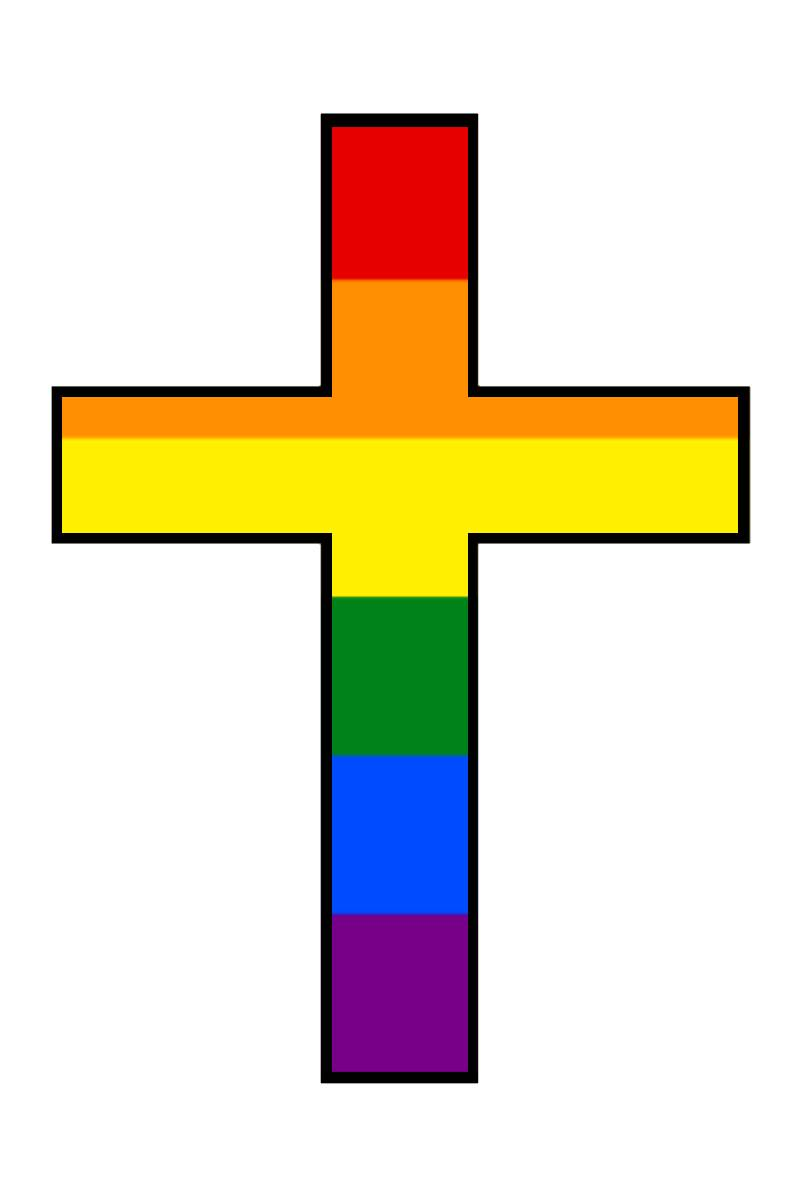
Symbolic depiction of the intersection of Christianity and LGBTQ people, combining the Christian cross and LGBTQ rainbow flag

Christianity has traditionally regarded male homosexual behavior to be an immoral practice, or sinful, and most major Christian movements continue to hold this view.

Some Christian movements have only denominations that have a conservative view, like the Catholic Church, the Eastern Orthodox churches, the Church of Jesus Christ Latter-Day Saints, and the Seventh-day Adventist churches, although some of these movements have networks of LGBTQ people.

Some Christian movements have denominations that have liberal or conservative views, like the Anglican churches, Lutheran churches, Presbyterian churches, Methodist churches, Quaker churches, Mennonite churches, Baptist churches, and Pentecostal churches.

The Metropolitan Community Church has been founded specifically to serve the Christian LGBTQ community. Its founder, Troy Perry, was the first minister to conduct a same-sex marriage in public, as well as filing the first lawsuit for legal recognition of same-sex marriages in the United States.

Studies in the US show more LGBTQ individuals identify as Protestant than Catholic.

==== Lesbianism ====
Lesbians face different social and cultural preconceptions than gay men. Their experience in Christianity is sometimes dissimilar to that of gay men, although lesbianism has also traditionally been considered a sin within the religion.

In 1982, lesbian members of DignityUSA founded the Conference for Catholic Lesbians out of concern that DignityUSA was too oriented toward males.

In 1986 the Evangelical and Ecumenical Women's Caucus (EEWC), then known as the Evangelical Women's Caucus International, passed a resolution stating: "Whereas homosexual people are children of God, and because of the biblical mandate of Jesus Christ that we are all created equal in God's sight, and in recognition of the presence of the lesbian minority in EWCI, EWCI takes a firm stand in favor of civil rights protection for homosexual persons."

A survey of self-identified lesbian women found a "dissonance" between their religious and sexual identities. This dissonance correlated with being an evangelical Christian before coming out.

=== Bisexuality ===
Very few churches have released statements about bisexuality, and research into the bisexual Christian community has been affected by the fact that bisexual Christians are often considered the same as lesbian and gay Christians. However, in 1972, a Quaker group, the Committee of Friends on Bisexuality, issued the "Ithaca Statement on Bisexuality" supporting bisexuals. The Statement, which may have been "the first public declaration of the bisexual movement" and "was certainly the first statement on bisexuality issued by an American religious assembly," appeared in the Quaker Friends Journal and The Advocate in 1972. Today Quakers have varying opinions on LGBTQ people and rights, with some Quaker groups more accepting than others.

=== Asexuality ===
Asexuality may be considered the lack of a sexual orientation, or one of the four variations thereof, alongside heterosexuality, homosexuality, and bisexuality.

As asexuality is relatively new to public discourse, few Christian denominations discuss it and the Bible does not clearly state a view on it. However, some Christian publications have recently made statements on the subject. In the Christian magazine Vision, David Nantais, S.J. and Scott Opperman, S.J. wrote in 2002, "Asexual people do not exist. Sexuality is a gift from God and thus a fundamental part of our human identity. Those who repress their sexuality are not living as God created them to be: fully alive and well." However, Lisa Petriello wrote the article "Why We Christians Should Accept Asexuals", which was published in 2020 in Katy Christian Magazine. In this article, she points out that there is nothing in the Bible condemning asexuality, and posits that both Jesus and Saint Paul were asexual.

== See also ==
- Side A, Side B, Side X, Side Y (theological views)
- Blessing of same-sex unions in Christian churches
- LGBTQ-affirming Christian denominations
- Queer theology
