= Homosexuality and the Western Christian Tradition =

1955 book by Derrick Sherwin Bailey

- Cover
- Author: Derrick Sherwin Bailey
- Language: English
- Subject: History of Christianity and homosexuality
- Publisher: Longmans, Green and Co
- Publication date: 1955
- Publication place: United Kingdom
- Media type: Print (Hardcover and Paperback)
- Pages: 181 (1986 Shoe String edition)
- ISBN: 978-0208014924

Homosexuality and the Western Christian Tradition is a 1955 book about the history of Christianity and homosexuality by the theologian Derrick Sherwin Bailey.

== Reception ==
The medieval historian John Boswell described Homosexuality and the Western Christian Tradition as a "pioneering study". He wrote that almost all "modern historical research on gay people in the Christian West" has depended upon it and that it was still the best work on its subject in print. However, he wrote that it, "suffers from an emphasis on negative sanctions which gives a wholly misleading picture of medieval practice, is limited primarily to data regarding France and Britain, and has been superseded even in its major focus, biblical analysis."

The gay scholar John Lauritsen described Homosexuality and the Western Christian Tradition as the work of a Christian apologist who pleads for greater tolerance while "striving to exonerate the Church from her historic culpability in fostering intolerance".

== See also ==
- Christianity, Social Tolerance, and Homosexuality
