= OneBodyOneFaith =

UK-based charity

- Formation: 1976
- Founder: Peter Elers
- Location: United Kingdom
- Website: onebodyonefaith.org.uk

OneBodyOneFaith, formerly the Lesbian and Gay Christian Movement (LGCM), is a UK-based international Charity that seeks to support LGBT Christians.

== History ==
The Gay (and lesbian) Christian Movement was founded in April 1976 by Peter Elers, an openly gay vicar of Thaxted in Essex, at a public meeting at the Sir John Cass School in the City of London. They were focused on helping gay Christians find community, support, and theological resources in a time where the majority of churches were hostile towards homosexuality. From 1977 to 1984, the movement expanded nationally, creating a central organizational structure and established local groups in many major cities. They also expressed ethical and theological statements, emphasizing a supportive understanding of same-sex relationships and provided counseling to those impacted by religious prejudice. They also built connections with the wider gay community. In 1977, local chapters were organised, followed in 1978 by the Women's Group, the Evangelical Fellowship in 1979 and Young Lesbian and Gay Christians in 2000. The Evangelical Fellowship was established to support members who faced difficulties reconciling evangelical identity with sexuality. By 1985, the LGCM began to face backlash from the church. In 1987, the Church of England Synod approved a measure aimed at gay clergy, despite LGCM lobbying. They also faced criticism due to being male dominated, so the name was changed to the Lesbian and Gay Christian Movement, along with adding lesbian theology created from the experiences of women. Following national political shifts and increased public debate over LGBTQ+ rights in the late 1980s, the LGCM revived its campaign efforts. They founded the Institute for the Study of Christianity and Sexuality with the goal of promoting the discussion of human sexuality in Christian communities. By the 1990s, they also strengthened the activity of local grass-root groups, organizing through Methodist, Roman Catholic, youth, and women’s caucuses. The first General Secretary of the Movement was Jim Cotter, followed by Richard Kirker.

The LGCM used a range of mobilization strategies to advance the rights of gay Christians within and beyond the church. They worked to build internal unity, create a positive public image, and mobilize practical resources like volunteers and fundraising networks. In 1999, the LGCM published Christian Homophobia, a report alleging that the church teachings contributed to homophobic abuse in Britain. In this report, they argued that churches held "disproportionate influence on legislation affecting gay and lesbian people", and documented cases of clergy losing employment and housing due to their sexuality. They also recommended an "inclusive equal-opportunity policy", non-discriminatory language in church materials, homophobia-awareness training, access to same-sex blessings, and improved theological education on sexuality.

The Movement was based initially in the tower of St Botolph's Church, Aldgate; however, in 1989, after a legal challenge by the Archdeacon of London, the Church Council was compelled to evict LGCM, and Oxford House, a settlement project in Bethnal Green, took them in and provided a home for the next 25 years. In 2015 the trustees took the decision to move out of London and relocate LGCM to a new home in Nottinghamshire. On 14 February 2017 LGCM and Changing Attitude England become OneBodyOneFaith, united to campaign together for the changes that we need to see for LGBTI+ people to fully embraced and for their gifts and contributions to the life and mission of the church in England to be fully realised.

=== Present day ===
In 2021, OneBodyOneFaith welcomed Accepting Evangelicals into the ministry and growing work the charity.

The current chief executive is Luke Dowding. The current Co-Chairs are Rev Jarel Robinson-Brown and Rev Mark Rowland.

Recent landmark events and programmes include: the development of Space to Be, an online initiative during the pandemic, the sponsorship of the Creating Sanctuary resource, the first UK national memorial event for harm and the loss of LGBT+ life to suicide in Christian contexts, the support of denominations and traditions as they discern conversations regarding LGBT+ inclusion (including ordination and marriage), international symposiums exploring leadership, coordinating efforts to challenge systemic homophobia and transphobia in the church and wider society, and regular materials and resources for members and supporters.

== See also ==
- Homosexuality and Christianity
  - History of Christianity and homosexuality
  - The Bible and homosexuality
- List of Christian denominational positions on homosexuality
  - Anglican views of homosexuality
  - Homosexuality in the Roman Catholic priesthood
- Gay bishops
  - Jeffrey John (Dean of St Albans)
  - Gene Robinson (Bishop of New Hampshire)
- The "Soho masses" at the Church of Our Lady of the Assumption and St Gregory
