= Norena Shopland =

Welsh heritage and LGBTQ+ historian

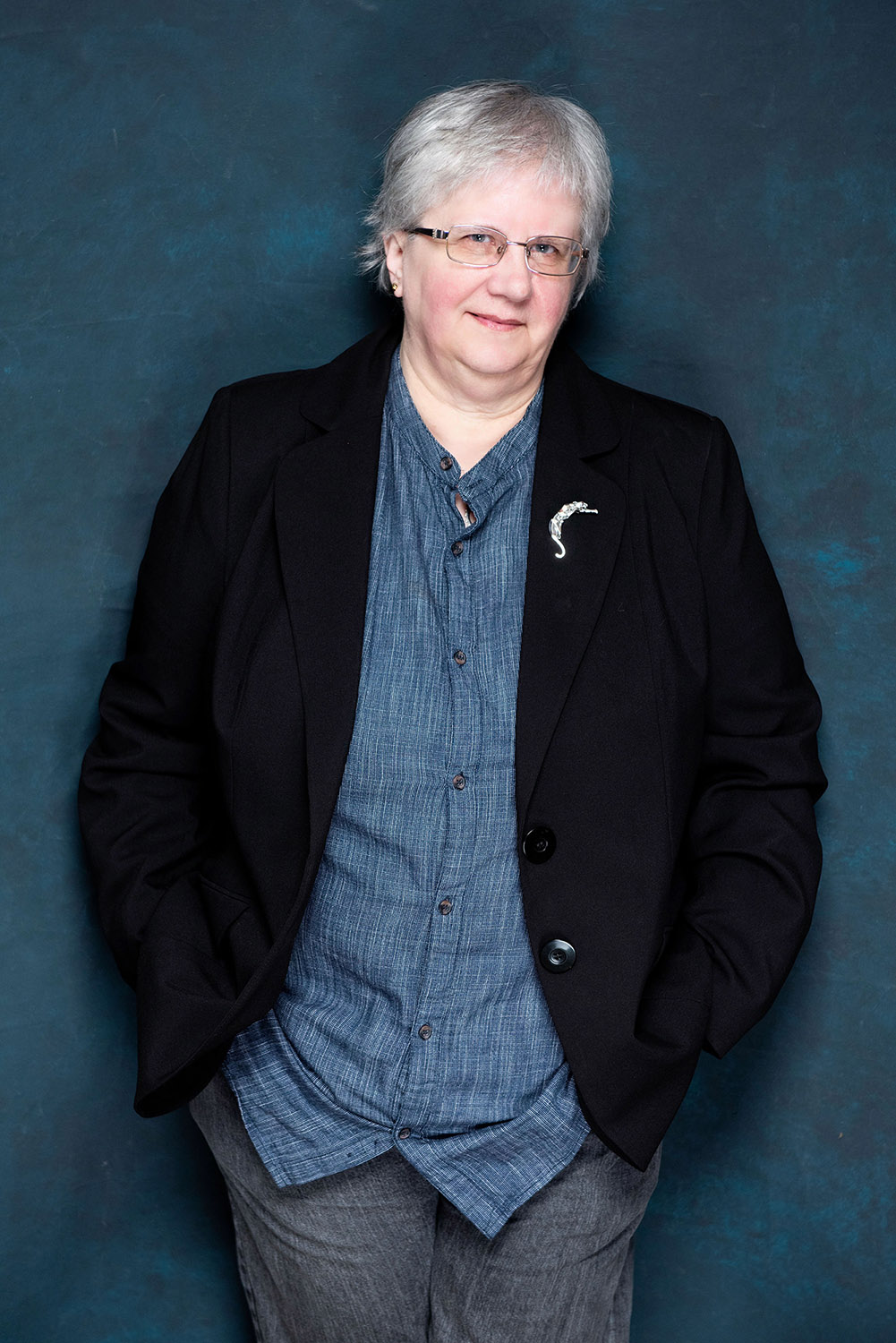
- Sian Treberth Photography
- Honours: Awarded an honorary doctorate by the Open University October 2023

Norena Shopland is a Welsh historian and writer who specialises in (LGBTQ+) research and history. She has been highlighted as a Welsh LGBTQ+ person of significance, and she gives talks, lectures and workshops on Welsh heritage and LGBT+ history. She has organised, curated and consulted on exhibitions and events within the heritage sector in Wales.

Shopland is one of the founders of the network forum Hanes LHDT+ Cymru / LGBTQ+ Research Group Wales, which unites and supports LGBTQ+ history of Wales enthusiasts and researchers. She is the diversity officer for the Women's History Network.

== Biography ==
Born in Cardiff, Shopland initially trained as an archaeologist, and performed various jobs internationally for organisations including The British Museum. She was awarded a grant by English Heritage to pursue an MA in Artefacts at University College London (UCL) and subsequently wrote two books Archaeological Finds: An Identification Guide and An Archaeological Finds Manual.

Shopland describes her interest in LGBTQ+ history as ‘inevitable'. She worked for the Lesbian and Gay Newsmedia Archive ( LAGNA) as well as on the Reassessing What We Collect project for the Museum of London, and an oral history on women with HIV/AIDS at Positively Women in association with the British Library.

When Shopland moved back to her native land of Wales, she focused on Welsh LGBTQ+ history.

Shopland has worked with Amgueddfa Cymru – Museum Wales and many other museums and archives raising awareness on the inclusion of equality and diversity in their collections. She also worked with Cardiff Story Museum on the exhibition Celebrating LGBTQ+ Cardiff.

She frequently travels to give talks, including a presentation at the House of Commons to commemorate the 50th anniversary of the Sexual Offences Act (1967) and to make TV and Radio appearances.

== Contribution to Welsh LGBT+ history and heritage ==
Shopland's first involvement in this sector was for Welsh Pride, a 2012 initiative funded by the National Heritage Lottery Fund (NLHF) the first of its kind to focus exclusively on LGBTQ+ history in relation to Wales. John Davies, the Welsh historian, gave his first speech on gay history during the event. Shopland asked the National Poet of Wales, Gillian Clarke, if she would write what became the first poem that a National Poet or Poet Laureate of any country in the world had written celebrating the LGBTQ+ people of their country. Clarke took her inspiration from the Ladies of Llangollen to write the poem Sarah at Plas Newydd, July 5th 1788, which appears in her collection Ice.

The project created a timeline of notable Welsh LGBTQ+ history dates, people, allies and events that Shopland resurrected and published as an e-magazine with funding from Rhondda Cynon Taff (RCT) Pride in 2020.

In 2018 with co-author Dr. Daryl Leeworthy, Shopland produced a research guide for Glamorgan Archives entitled Queering Glamorgan. This is available as a free download and provides a guide to searching archives for LGBTQ+ historical material.

Shopland published A Practical Guide to searching LGBTQIA records with Routledge in 2020. This led to an invitation to collaborate with CILIP at their 2021 Festival of Pride and Knowledge event.

Using the methodologies outlined in 'Queering Glamorgan' and 'A Practical Guide...', Shopland demonstrated how they could be applied to other diverse areas, outlined in her article for the History Matters Journal. This was demonstrated in work with Race Council Cymru on their Windrush Cymru project, that coincided with the 50th anniversary of the arrival of HMS Windrush to the UK. The exhibition launched at St. Fagans, and toured other venues in Wales. In 2021 Shopland was commissioned by the Welsh Government to provide LGBTQ+ language and history training for all local museum, libraries, and archives in Wales.

Shopland also writes on Welsh women's history. Her most recent work led to the opening of the exhibition Tip Girls in September 2021 at the National Coal Museum (Big Pit), highlighting the experience of Women both underground and overground in the coal industry.

Shopland was interviewed for International Women's Day 2023 by Wales Online, where she described the difficulties of researching lesbian history, and the disparity of recognition between men and women. The article concluded with a brief summary of the life of Cranogwen, one of the women featured in her 2017 book, Forbidden Lives.

For Pride Month 2023, the National Library of Wales held the first ever queer tour of the collection, where visitors were taken on a journey through the library's 'Proud Collection' on a tour written and presented by Shopland

In 2024, Shopland published The Welsh County LGBTQ+ Timeline Collection, detailed chronological listings celebrating local LGBTQ+ people, allies and events, the only country in the world to have this kind of local information.

In order to interest people in history, Shopland in association with Amgueddfa Cymru ran a writing workshop entitled Proud Writing, getting people to produce creative responses to stories from the past, for a free downloadable eBook. Following this, Shopland was invited onto The Welsh Women's Peace Petition (1923-4) to host a similar writing workshop, resulting in the free eBook, Peace of Writing. Other titles in this series include Out and Proud, LGBTQ+ stories from Monmouth; and The Beat of Our Hearts.

== Recognition and Honours ==
Shopland featured on the Wales Pinc List (an annual list compiled by Walesonline of the most influential LGBTQ+ persons in Wales) from 2019-2026.

She was highlighted by Walesonline as one of Wales’ most influential gay women during Lesbian Visibility Week in 2021

For International Women's Day 2020, Wales Arts Review writers included Shopland in a list that suggested 100 Welsh women who were sufficiently interesting or inspiring to merit a follow on Twitter. Shopland has contributed articles on Heritage topics for Wales Arts Review, such as Amgueddfa Cymru – National Museum Wales Queer Tour which invited visitors to join a tour to view the permanent collection through a Queer lens.

Shopland is included in the Women's Equality Network (WEN) Wales 100+ Welsh Women list which credits brilliant Welsh Women both past and present.

A regular contributor to LGBTQ+ History Month, Shopland wrote a guest blog for Llwydroeth Cymru/Welsh Government in 2018, in which she wrote about her motivation for researching and writing Forbidden Lives, concluding that 'Because history and politics aside, they're rattling good stories – and after all, everyone loves a good story!' Shopland also wrote a guest blog for the Amgueddfa Cymru on the 'Ladies of Llangollen', who had featured in one of the stories from Forbidden Lives. Another story from the book discusses the academic and historian John Boswell and Gerallt Cymro, whose Topographia Hibernica was cited by Boswell in his controversial last book, Same-Sex Unions in Pre-Modern Europe (1994). Shopland wrote in defence of Boswell for The Gay and Lesbian Review Worldwide. Shopland was interviewed for Celtic Life International Magazine in August 2021 for an article entitled 'The Celtic Rainbow' which discussed LGBTQ+ history across the Celtic nations.

Following publication of 'A History of Women in Mens Clothes', Shopland wrote a guest blog for the Parliamentary Archives. On 12 March 2022 a new exhibition entitled 'Trawsnewid' (Transformation) opened at the National Waterfront Museum in Swansea, honouring Welsh LGBTQ+ people and their culture. A new portrait of Shopland was displayed as part of an exhibit of 12 portraits by the artist Aled Wyn Williams. Each portrait showing someone who has an 'active and positive' influence within Wales' LGBT+ community.

Shopland is currently a contributing columnist to NationCymru. Her first piece, published in August 2023 described the history of Women's football in Wales

Shopland was invited to talk at the 'Trusting Queer Archives' event in October 2023, organised by the Nordic Network for Queer History Archives and Activities (Nnaqh)

In October 2023, Shopland was awarded an honorary doctorate from the Open University in recognition of her work on raising awareness of diversity in Welsh history. In June 2025, Shopland was one of five people named 'National Treasures' in WalesOnline's Pinc List 2025: Wales' most influential LGBTQ+ people.

== Published works ==
| Title | Date Published | Publisher | Notes/Reviews |
|---|---|---|---|
| Forbidden Lives: Lesbian, Gay, Bisexual and Transgender Stories from Wales | 2017 | Seren | A historical examination of LGBTQ+ stories from Wales. The book was featured in WalesOnline. Shopland was also interviewed about the book. |
| The Curious Case of the Eisteddfod Baton | 2019 | Wordcatcher Publishing | A celebration of choral singing and Welsh goldmining. |
| The Veronal Mystery: Suppressed Evidence, Missing Witnesses – Was it Murder? | 2020 | Wordcatcher Publishing | The death of Eric Trevanion from an overdose of Veronal – or was his 'close companion' Albert Roe implicated? Reviewed by Tatler; The Times and Wales Online |
| A Practical Guide to Searching LGBTQIA Historical Record | 2020 | Routledge | |
| A History of Women in Men's Clothes: from cross-dressing to empowerment | 2021 | Pen & Sword | Examining convention-defying women that dressed as men. Shopland wrote a guest blog on the subject for the Women's History Network. |
| The Welsh Gold King: a biography of William Pritchard Morgan MP | 2022 | Pen & Sword | The life of the man behind the last gold rush in the UK.Shopland wrote a guest blog for Amgueddfa Cymru – Museum Wales |
| Women in Welsh Coal Mining: Tip Girls at Work in a Men's World | 2023 | Pen & Sword | The women of Welsh coal mining. The book was featured in Walesonline and NationCymru |
| Woman's Wales? | 2024 | Parthian Books | Chapter on 'From prohibition to promotion,' an account of LGBTQ+ history since devolution |
| My love all Love excels: The Remarkable Life and Times of 17th-Century Poet, Katherine Philips | 2026 | Parthian Books | A new biography of Katherine Philips: a seventeenth-century poet and playwright. |

== TV and radio appearances ==
These are some of Shopland's media appearances that are still available on line:

- BBC Radio Wales – The Story of LGBT Wales (2017)
- Radio Cardiff – Forbidden Lives (2017)
- BBC Radio Wales – Sunday Supplement (2018)
- ITV Wales – LGBTQ+ history: Celebrating 18 years of Section 28 repeal (20211)
- BBC One – Dark Land: 'The Hunt for Wales' Worst Serial Killer' (2022)
