= Christianity, Social Tolerance, and Homosexuality =

1980 book by John Boswell

Christianity, Social Tolerance, and Homosexuality: Gay People in Western Europe from the Beginning of the Christian Era to the Fourteenth Century
- Cover of the first edition
- Author: John Boswell
- Language: English
- Subject: History of Christianity and homosexuality
- Publisher: University of Chicago Press
- Publication date: 1980
- Publication place: United States
- Media type: Print (Hardcover and Paperback)
- Pages: 424
- ISBN: 0-226-06711-4

Christianity, Social Tolerance, and Homosexuality: Gay People in Western Europe from the Beginning of the Christian Era to the Fourteenth Century is a 1980 book about the history of Christianity and homosexuality by the historian John Boswell.

== Summary ==
The work is divided into four parts: “Points of Departure”, “The Christian Tradition”, “Shifting Fortunes” and “The Rise of Intolerance”. In his introduction, Boswell discusses Derrick Sherwin Bailey's Homosexuality and the Western Christian Tradition (1955), which he describes as a "pioneering study" upon which almost all "modern historical research on gay people in the Christian West" has depended. However, he writes that it, "suffers from an emphasis on negative sanctions which gives a wholly misleading picture of medieval practice, is limited primarily to data regarding France and Britain, and has been superseded even in its major focus, biblical analysis."

The central thesis of the book is that, contrary to prevalent beliefs, early Christianity was more tolerant of homosexuality than later periods. Boswell argues that there was a more accepting attitude towards same-sex relationships in the early centuries of the Christian era, and that the condemnation of homosexuality by the Church emerged later.

Boswell argues that intolerance of homosexuality was not an inherent aspect of Christian teaching. The main objective of the book is to challenge the widespread belief that religious beliefs, whether Christian or otherwise, have been the primary cause of intolerance towards gay individuals. The author acknowledges, however, that periods of intolerance did occur in the history of the Church, specifically from the 4th to the 6th century, in the 13th and 14th centuries, and in subsequent centuries until the 19th. Despite these periods of intolerance, the author highlights that from the beginning of Christianity to the middle of the 4th century and from the early Middle Ages until the 13th, there were extended periods when overt expressions of homosexuality were accepted or warmly tolerated in many parts of Europe.

== Publication history ==
Christianity, Social Tolerance, and Homosexuality was published in 1980 by the University of Chicago Press. In 1981, the book appeared in paperback.

== Reception ==
Christianity, Social Tolerance, and Homosexuality won a National Book Award and the Stonewall Book Award in 1981.

The historians George Chauncey and Martin Duberman, writing with the women's studies scholar Martha Vicinus, described Christianity, Social Tolerance, and Homosexuality as an "erudite study". They credited Boswell with providing "a revolutionary interpretation of the Western tradition", but noted that his premise that "a gay identity and gay people can be found throughout history" had been challenged as "essentialist" by social constructionists.

The political scientist Sheila Jeffreys argued that while Boswell covered material that "should provide fascinating insights into gender, power, and sexuality" he "avoids any such insights scrupulously." She criticized him for confusing "the abuse of slave children in prostitution" with "eroticism" and concluded that like other gay theorists he was guilty of "moral and political myopia."

The philologist Warren Johansson, the art historian Wayne R. Dynes and John Lauritsen criticized Boswell's thesis. They argued that Boswell had attempted to whitewash the historic crimes of the Christian Church against gay men.
