= Same-Sex Unions in Pre-Modern Europe =

Nonfiction book by John Boswell

- The first edition cover featuring a depiction of a seventh-century icon of Serge and Bacchus
- Author: John Boswell
- Language: English
- Subject: Adelphopoiesis
- Publisher: Villard Books (US); HarperCollins (UK)
- Publication date: 1994
- Publication place: United States
- Media type: Print (hardcover · paperback)
- ISBN: 978-0679432289

Same-Sex Unions in Pre-Modern Europe (UK title: The Marriage of Likeness: Same-Sex Unions in Pre-Modern Europe) is a historical study written by the American historian John Boswell and first published by Villard Books in 1994. Then a professor at Yale University, Boswell was a specialist on homosexuality in Christian Europe, having previously authored three books on the subject. It proved to be his final publication, released in the same year as his death.

Boswell's primary argument is that throughout much of medieval Christian Europe, unions between figures of the same sex and gender were socially accepted. Outlining the problems with accurately translating Ancient Greek and Latin terms regarding love, relationships, and unions into English, he discusses the wider context of marriage and unions in the classical world and early Christian Europe.

The book attracted widespread academic and popular attention on publication. Reviews in academic, peer-reviewed journals were mixed, with some scholars arguing that Boswell's translation of key terms was incorrect. The book was also widely reviewed in the mainstream media and the Christian media, with some conservative reviewers claiming that it was written to support the "gay agenda".

== Summary ==
In the introduction, Boswell highlights the subjectivity of marital unions, which differ between societies in their function and purpose. He explains his use of "same-sex unions" over "gay marriage", outlining the epistemological problems of the latter in a historical context. Noting that same-sex unions have been ethnographically and historically recorded in Africa, Asia and the Americas, he remarks that there is no reason why they should not have been found in Europe. He acknowledges that the book focuses on male same-sex unions, explaining that the historical evidence from pre-modern Europe predominantly discusses men, the socially dominant gender of the time.

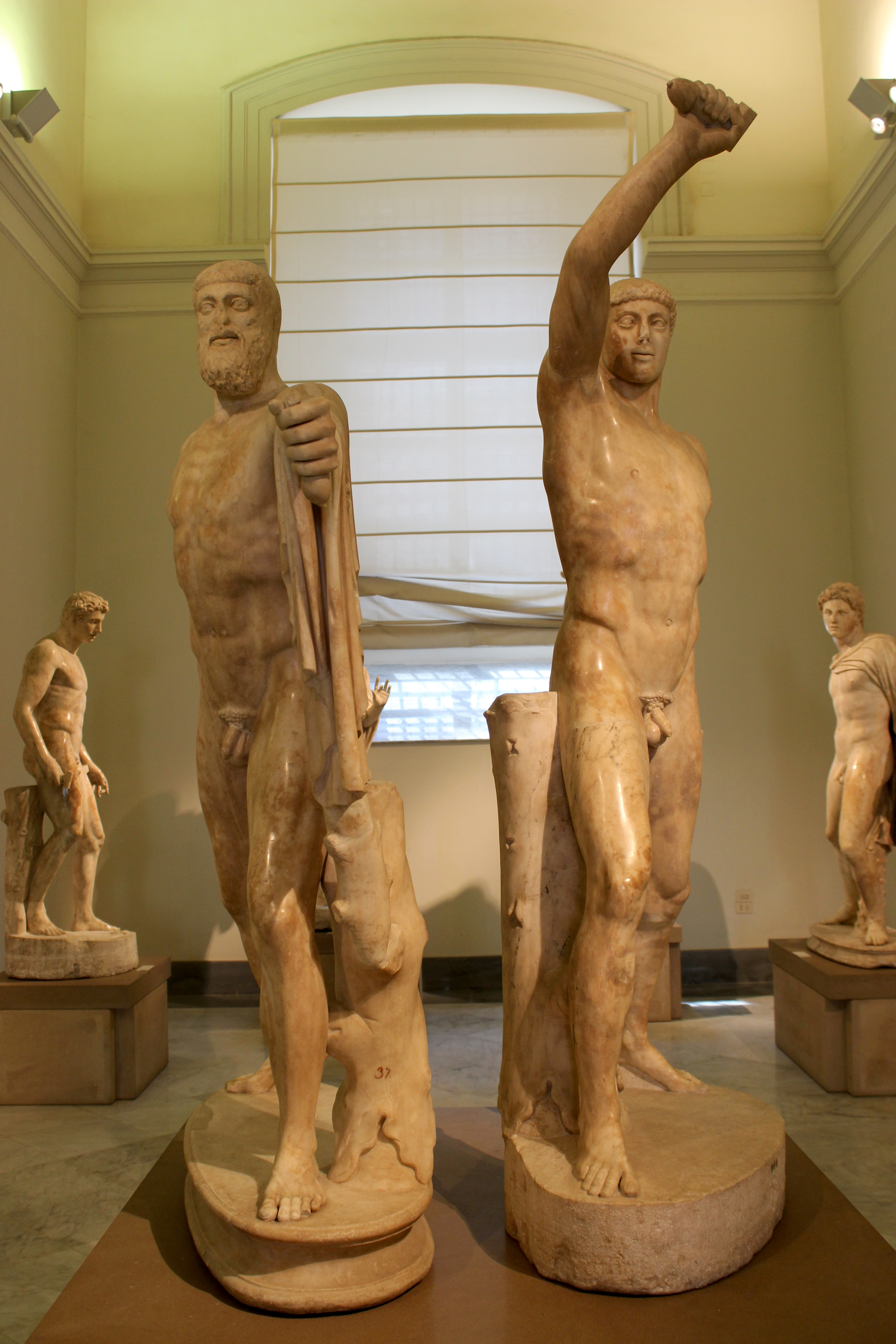
The Greek same-sex couple Harmodius and Aristogeiton were responsible for killing Hipparchus, becoming symbols of Athenian democracy.

Chapter one, "The Vocabulary of Love and Marriage", highlights the problems in translating words describing both emotions and unions from Ancient Greek and Latin into Modern English, and explains that "marriage" carries with it many associations for contemporary westerners that would have been alien to pre-modern Europe. The second chapter, "Heterosexual Matrimony in the Greco-Roman World", explains the multiple forms of mixed-sex union found in classical Europe. Wealthy men could enter into one or more different types of erotic, sexual or romantic relationships with women; they could use those who were slaves or servants who were under their domination for sexual gratification, hire a prostitute, hire a concubine, or marry a woman (either monogamously, or in many cases, polygamously).

In chapter three, "Same-Sex Unions in the Greco-Roman World", Boswell argues that between circa 400 BCE and 400 CE, male same-sex relationships were treated much the same as mixed-sex relationships, albeit being "more fluid and less legalistic". He cites historical examples such as those of Harmodius and Aristogeiton, and Hadrian and Antinous, as well as literary examples such as Nisus and Euryalus in Virgil's Aeneid, and characters in Petronius' Satyricon and Xenophon of Ephesus' Ephesian Tale. He dismisses the counter-argument that these men were friends rather than lovers, and argues that the Latin term for "brother" was a euphemism for "lover". Moving on to the evidence for consecrated same-sex unions in classical Europe, he discusses Nero's union with Sporus, Martial's description of a male–male "marriage" in the early second century, and a female–female union in Lucian's Dialogues of the Courtesans. Boswell argues that these same-sex unions were not "imitative" of mixed-sex marriage, but perhaps represented an attempt by same-sex couples to "participate in" the wider culture. He subsequently deals with the introduction of legal prohibitions against such same-sex unions in the late Empire.

Chapter four, "Views of the New Religion", looks at the influence of early Christianity on relationships. Noting that the faith encouraged asceticism and celibacy, he discusses the devalued role of marriage in Christian society, and the increased popularity of asexual marriage. He moves on to look at the evidence for same-sex "paired saints" in early Christianity, such as Nearchos and Polyeuct, Ruth and Naomi, and Serge and Bacchus, arguing that these couples were perhaps romantically involved. The fifth chapter, "The Development of Nuptial Offices", opens by explaining that the early Christian Church was uninterested in marriage ceremonies, which were largely left secular; he notes that the Western Church only declared marriage a sacrament and developed canonical laws to regulate ceremonies at the Fourth Lateran Council of 1215. He then discusses Barberini 336, a circa-eighth-century Greek liturgical manuscript containing four ceremonies for sacramental union, one of which is between two men. Discussing this and similar recorded ceremonies, Boswell questions what they represent, if they reflect homosexuality, and ponders if these are "marriage" ceremonies, in doing so rejecting the idea that they represent ceremonies of adoption or "spiritual fraternity". The sixth chapter, "Comparisons of Same-Sex and Heterosexual Ceremonies of Union", looks at these ceremonies, and their varying similarities and differences.

Chapter seven, "The History of Same-Sex Unions in Medieval Europe", looks at further evidence for such ceremonies in the Byzantine Empire, including stories such as those of Nicholas and Basil, and then examines the Christian prohibitions that were later introduced to put a stop to them.

== Reception ==
=== Academic reception ===
Speculum, the journal of the Medieval Academy of America, published a review by the historian Joan Cadden of Kenyon College, in which she described the book as a monument to Boswell's "prodigious accomplishments", providing an opportunity to celebrate his life and mourn his death. (Note: John Boswell died of AIDS-related complications in December 1994, shortly after his book was published.) Although largely positive of it, she thought that Boswell's choice of the term "same-sex union" was unsuccessful, because in its usage it became a "transparent euphemism" for "homosexual marriage", the very term that Boswell sought to avoid. She also thought he was unwilling to deal with the views of theorists of social construction, as evidenced by his description of the North American berdache as "homosexuals". Ultimately she thought that the book greatly added to the continuing debate on the issue.

The sociologist Lutz Kaelber of Indiana University, Bloomington, reviewed Boswell's text for the Contemporary Sociology journal. He considered it a "dazzling study" and thought that Boswell had overcome "some very formidable obstacles" in assembling his information. He noted that Boswell's main argument relies on his controversial translation of Greek terms which have already been criticised in the scholarly community. Speculating that Boswell's arguments will spark debate for decades to come, Kaelber suggested that even if his ideas were rejected by future scholarship, the book would still be very important for showing how "social arrangements and processes can shape and sometimes bend normative perceptions of the boundaries between friendship, affection, and love." Concluding his review, he praised the book as "an admirable, challenging, seminal work", although he lamented that it did not make use of sociology.

The classicist and critic Daniel Mendelsohn, himself openly gay, published a scathing and detailed review of Boswell's book in the scholarly journal Arion. According to Mendelsohn, judged as a work of philology Same-Sex Unions in Pre-Modern Europe is a "bad book", and "its arguments are weak, its methods unsound, its conclusions highly questionable". Mendelsohn argued that Boswell failed to establish his two basic contentions: that adelphopoiesis (literally "creation of brothers") was a ceremony akin to marriage rather than a celebration of a ritualized friendship, probably intended for the reconciliation of heads of households, as argued by previous scholars who had considered the matter (such as Giovanni Tamassia and Paul Koschaker), and that homosexual lovers were commonly characterized in the classical and early medieval worlds as "brothers". Moreover, Mendelsohn impugned Boswell's decision to pitch his work at a general audience incapable of critically evaluating the philological and documentary evidence adduced, arguing that the work as a whole rested on "a rhetorical strategy whose disingenuousness verges on fraud."

The sexologists Timothy Perper and Martha Cornog reviewed Same-Sex Unions for The Journal of Sex Research, noting that Boswell was clearly aware of the social repercussions of his work for contemporary lesbian and gay people. They believed that its direct effect on American political and social thought would be its greatest influence, far beyond that which it had within medieval scholarship. Although stating that they were not convinced by all of Boswell's arguments, and were unqualified to judge many others, they thought that the book constituted a "major work of historiography" by bringing many neglected primary sources to a wider audience.

The historian Robin Darling Young disputed Boswell's thesis as well. Brent Shaw has also criticized Boswell's methodology and conclusions. "Boswell's tendency to misconstrue evidence extends beyond simple matters of definition, however, to the very social institutions that are central to his analysis." In Shaw's view, Boswell's analysis compares unfavorably to that of Gabriel Herman who studied "ritualized kinship" in the 1987 Ritualized Friendship and the Greek City. "The kinds of words used to express the new relationship of 'brothers' (words that are also found in Boswell's ecclesiastical rituals) were employed precisely because the men often entered into these relationships not out of love, but out of fear and suspicion. Hence the effusive emphasis on safety and trust."

Judge John T. Noonan of the United States Court of Appeals for the Ninth Circuit reviewed the book for The Catholic Historical Review alongside John W. Baldwin's The Language of Sex: Five Voices from Northern France Around 1200. Briefly dismissing Boswell's work as unsuccessful at placing his interpretations within the "customs, language, and theology" of the time, he urges the reader to read Shaw's review in The New Republic.

Traditio, the publication of the Jesuit Fordham University in New York, produced a special issues dedicated to responding to Boswell's claims.

=== Wider reception ===
By July 1994, the book had gone through four printings and sold 31,000 copies, something far in excess of most works on medieval history.

General media reviewing the book in 1994–95 included The New Yorker, The Economist, People Weekly, The Spectator, the Los Angeles Times, The Boston Globe, the Chicago Tribune, The Times Literary Supplement, The Washington Post, The New Republic, the New Statesman & Society, The New York Times, and Newsweek.

In the International Gay and Lesbian Review, Elisabeth J. Davenport positively reviewed Boswell's book, remarking that it "appears to leave no imaginable ground upon which his accusers can challenge him." Noting that the book had been criticised before it had even been published by those opposed to its findings, she states her belief that while the case he presents is not infallible, the evidence "leans in his favour". Praising his use of footnotes, she considered it meticulously researched, and ultimately notes that it "adds both liveliness and dignity to the debate" regarding same-sex unions in pre-modern Europe, as such providing a "fitting memorial" for Boswell.

The book was also widely reviewed within Christian media in the United States. Writing in The Christian Century magazine, the historical theologian Philip Lyndon Reynolds expressed "profound problems" with Boswell's positions, which he claims rest largely on "ambiguity and equivocation" and "conceptual slipperiness". He is particularly critical of Boswell's use of "same-sex unions" as a translation of terms like adelphopoiesis, believing that this was an "ill-chosen and dangerously slippery term" because it has been widely interpreted in the media as an innuendo for "gay marriage" and therefore lacks neutrality. He also rejects Boswell's argument that the same-sex ceremonies were found in Western Christianity as well as Eastern Christianity, stating that the "heterogeneous bits of evidence" assembled to argue for this position were insufficient. Reynolds wrote:

Buried in this very muddled book is an interesting and plausible thesis, which goes like this: On the one hand, premodern Christian culture knew nothing of gay marriage, had no concept of the homosexual person and condemned homosexual acts. On the other hand, institutionalized or otherwise socially recognized same-sex relationships, such as the brotherhoods studied here, provided scope for the expression of what we would now regard as homosexual inclinations – much more scope than was possible, for example, in the cultures of the late Middle Ages and the Reformation. They may even have occasionally provided cover for homosexual acts. (If this is what Boswell had been judged to be saying, however, the book would not have captured the media's attention.)

== Subsequent scholarship ==
In 2003, The Friend by the scholar Alan Bray was published. Continuing Boswell's line of research, it served as a defense of his thesis, confirming that, "[f]or a very long period, formal amatory unions, conjugal, elective and indissoluble, between two members of the same sex were made in Europe, publicly recognised and consecrated in churches through Christian ritual."

== See also ==
- Homosexuality in ancient Rome
