= Alan Bray =

British historian and activist (1948–2001)

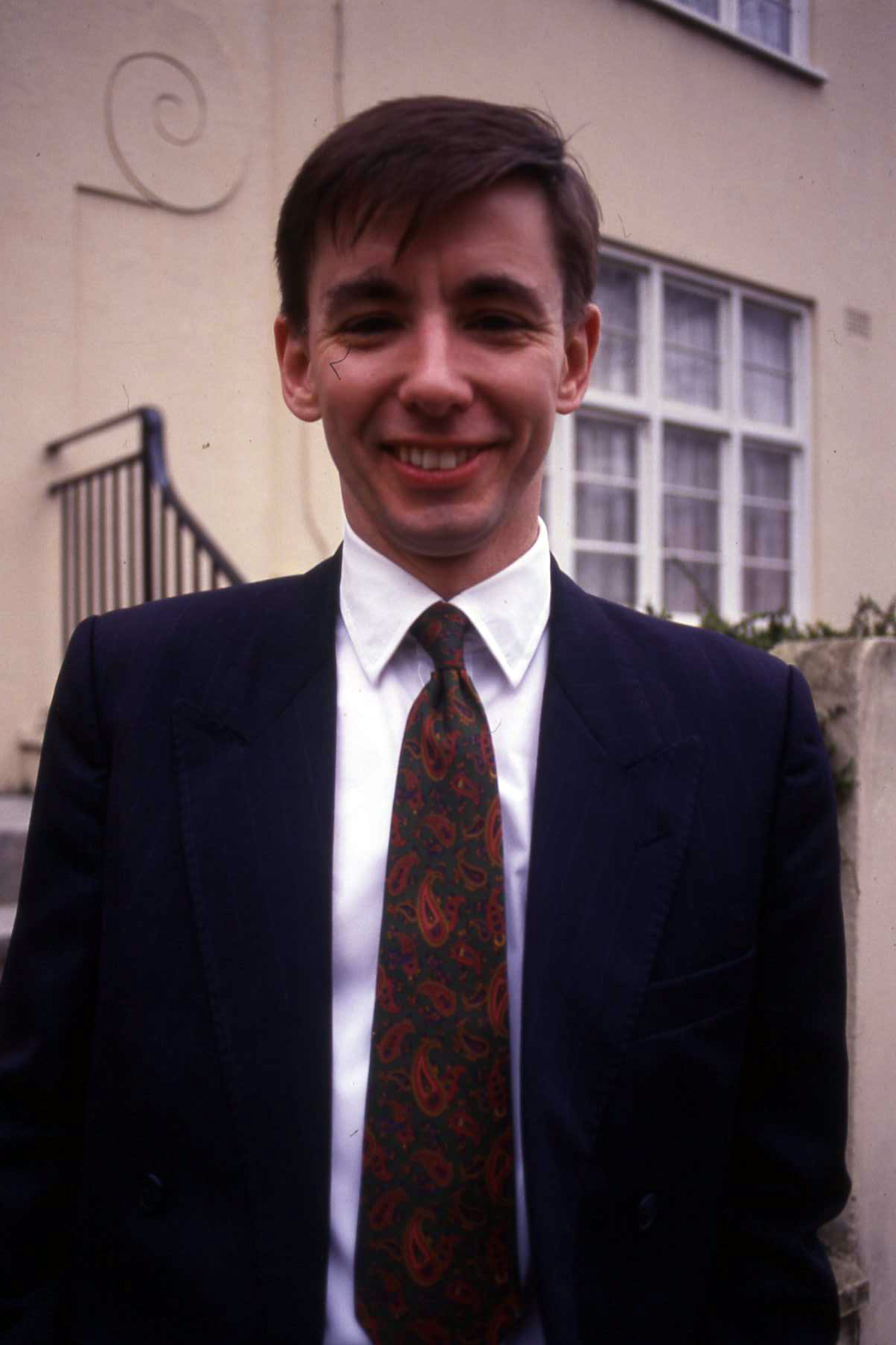
- Alan Bray, 1991
- Born: 13 October 1948; Hunslet, Leeds
- Died: 25 November 2001 (aged 53)
- Occupations: Civil servant, author
- Writing career
- Genre: Non-fiction
- Subject: Gay history

Alan Bray (13 October 1948 – 25 November 2001) was a British historian and gay rights activist. He was a Roman Catholic and had a particular interest in Christianity's relationship to homosexuality.

== Early life ==
Bray was born in Hunslet, Leeds, to a working-class family. His mother died when he was 12, an event that profoundly affected his relationships. He attended Leeds Central High School, where he met his lifelong friend Graham Wilson. He attended Bangor University and spent a year at an Anglican seminary before beginning a career in civil service.

== Gay rights activism ==
He became involved with the Gay Liberation Front in the 1970s and actively campaigned for gay rights. His interest in sexual politics influenced his work on history, which culminated in two books. His groundbreaking book Homosexuality in Renaissance England was published in 1982. His second book, The Friend, was published posthumously after his death from heart failure in 2001.

== Legacy ==
The Roman Catholic Caucus of the Lesbian and Gay Christian Movement, of which Bray was a member, instituted a series of Alan Bray Memorial Lectures on Catholic theology and homosexuality. British historians Michael Hunter, Miri Rubin, and Laura Gowing co-edited the book Love, Friendship and Faith in Europe, 1300–1800 (Palgrave Macmillan, 2005), a collection of essays inspired by Bray's idea of finding some universal component of homosexuality within the experiences of intimacy and friendship without "locating a discourse that identifies persons as homosexual." Nick Rumens' Queer Company: The Role and Meaning of Friendship in Gay Men's Work Lives (Ashgate, 2011), is also inspired by Alan Bray's scholarship. Valerie Traub (Thinking Sex with the Early Moderns) is amongst many subsequent LGBTQ scholars who have engaged with and been inspired by Bray's scholarship.

== Bibliography ==
- Homosexuality in Renaissance England (Gay Men's Press, 1982)
- The Friend (University of Chicago Press, 2002)
- The Clandestine Reformer: A Study Of The Rayner Scrutinies (1988)
