= History of Christianity and homosexuality =

Christian leaders have written about male homosexual activities since the first decades of Christianity; female homosexual behavior was almost entirely ignored. Throughout the majority of Christian history, most Christian theologians and denominations have considered homosexual behavior as immoral or sinful.

However, since the second half of the 20th century some prominent Christian theologians and religious groups have espoused a wide variety of beliefs and practices towards homosexuals, including the establishment of various "open and accepting" Christian churches and denominations that actively support LGBT members.

== Etymology ==
The first instance of the English word "homosexuals" used in a biblical translation was in the RSV New Testament published from 1946 until 1970, which simultaneously removed most "fornication" admonitions found in the prior ASV (1901) and KJV (1611) Bibles. Historically, the Vulgate contains the Latin stem "fornicat" within 92 verses representing sixteen centuries of Christian tradition on literally wording sexual admonishments, while verses now rebuking homosexuals were described in the Vulgate equivalent to "male-prostitute male-concubines". RSV set a modern trend in literally rebuking "homosexuals".

Several post-World War II translations of the Bible now have one to four verses rebuking homosexuals while replacing all mention of fornicators with "the immoral" or "sexual immoral" and leaving ambiguous homosexual or heterosexual immorality.

== Early Christianity ==
The history of Christianity and homosexuality has been much debated. The Hebrew Bible and its traditional interpretations in Judaism and Christianity have historically affirmed and endorsed a patriarchal and heteronormative approach towards human sexuality, favouring exclusively penetrative vaginal intercourse between men and women within the boundaries of marriage over all other forms of human sexual activity, including autoeroticism, masturbation, oral sex, non-penetrative and non-heterosexual sexual intercourse (all of which have been labeled as "sodomy" by some at various times), believing and teaching that such behaviors are forbidden because they are considered sinful, and further compared to or derived from the behavior of the alleged residents of Sodom and Gomorrah. However, the status of LGBT people in early Christianity is debated. Some maintain that the early Christian churches deplored transgender people and same-sex relationships, while others maintain that they accepted them on the level of their heterosexual counterparts. These disagreements concern, in some cases, the translations of certain terms, or the meaning and context of some biblical passages.

Before the rise of Christianity, certain sexual practices that are today considered "homosexual" had existed among certain groups, with some degree of social acceptance in ancient Rome (e.g. the relationship of a Roman citizen with a slave). Both societies viewed anal sex as an act of dominance by the active (penetrating) partner over the passive (penetrated) partner, representing no distinction from how vaginal sex was viewed. It was considered a sign of weakness and low social status (such as slavery or infamia) for a man to assume the passive role. There was no such stigma against a man who assumed the active role. Derrick Sherwin Bailey and Sarah Ruden both caution that it is anachronistic to project modern understandings of homosexuality onto ancient writings.

The Judaic prohibitions found in Leviticus 18:22 and 20:13 address the issue of sex between two men. The latter verse (20:13) says: "And if a man also lies with mankind, as with womankind, both of them have committed abomination; they shall surely be put to death; their blood shall be upon them."

In his fourth homily on Romans, John Chrysostom argued in the fourth century that homosexual acts are worse than murder and so degrading that they constitute a kind of punishment in itself, and that enjoyment of such acts makes them worse, "for suppose I were to see a person running naked, with his body all besmeared with mire, and yet not covering himself, but exulting in it, I should not rejoice with him, but should rather bewail that he did not even perceive that he was doing shamefully." He also said: "But nothing can there be more worthless than a man who has pandered himself. For not the soul only, but the body also of one who hath been so treated, is disgraced, and deserves to be driven out everywhere."

The writings of the early church contain strong condemnations of same-sex acts. Tertullian wrote, "When Paul asserts that males and females changed among themselves the natural use of the creature in that which is unnatural, he validates the natural way". Ambrosiaster wrote, "Paul tells us that these things came about, that a woman should lust after another woman, because God was angry at the human race because of its idolatry. Those who interpret this differently do not understand the force of the argument. For what is it to change the use of nature into a use which is contrary to nature, if not to take away the former and adopt the latter, so that the same part of the body should be used by each of the sexes in a way for which it was not intended?... It is clear that, because they changed the truth of God into a lie, they changed the natural use (of sexuality) into that use by which they were dishonored and condemned". John Chrysostom wrote, "No one can say that it was by being prevented from legitimate intercourse that they came to this pass or that it was from having no means to fulfill their desire that they were driven to this monstrous insanity... What is contrary to nature has something irritating and displeasing in it, so that they could not even claim to be getting pleasure out of it. For genuine pleasure comes from following what is according to nature. But when God abandons a person to his own devices, then everything is turned upside down." Cyprian wrote, "If you were able... to direct your eyes into secret places, to unfasten the locked doors of sleeping chambers and to open these hidden recesses to the perception of sight, you would behold that being carried on by the unchaste which a chaste countenance could not behold. You would see that it is in an indignity even to see... Men with frenzied lusts rush against men. Things are done which cannot even give pleasure to those who do them". Clement of Alexandria (c. 150 - c. 215), a Church Father and teacher of Origen, argued that Jesus had intended to eradicate homosexuality, alongside other pagan sexual practices.

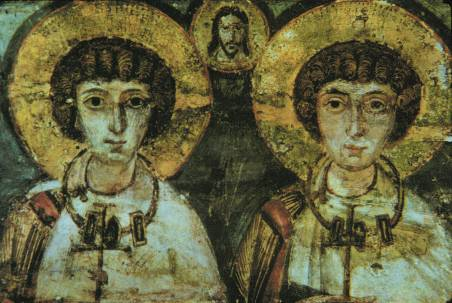
Saints Sergius and Bacchus

John Boswell, in his book published in 1994, contends that adelphopoiesis, a Christian rite for uniting two persons of the same sex as "spiritual brothers/sisters", amounted to an approved outlet for romantic and indeed sexual love between couples of the same sex. Boswell also drew attention to Saints Sergius and Bacchus, whose icon depicts the two standing together with Jesus between or behind them, a position he identifies with a pronubus or "best man". Critics of Boswell's views have argued that the union created was more like blood brotherhood; and that this icon is a typical example of an icon depicting two saints who were martyred together, with the usual image of Christ that appears on many religious icons, and therefore that there is no indication that it depicts a "wedding". But Sergius and Bacchus were both referred to as erastai in ancient Greek manuscripts, the same word used to describe lovers.

In her 2010 book Paul Among the People, Sarah Ruden rejects Boswell's interpretation but also argues that Paul the Apostle's writings on homosexuality (such as Romans 1: 26–27) cannot be interpreted as a condemnation of homosexuality as it is understood in modern times. Writing about the context of Greco-Roman culture, she writes: "There were no gay households; there were in fact no gay institutions or gay culture at all." Citing how society viewed the active and passive roles separately and viewed sex as an act of domination, she concludes that Paul was opposing sexual relations that were, at best, unequal. At worst, they were tantamount by modern standards to male rape and child sexual abuse.

In 314, the 16th Canon of the Council of Ancyra prescribed a penance of at least twenty years' duration for those "who have done the irrational" (alogeuesthai). At the time this was written, it referred to bestiality, not homosexuality. However, later Latin translations translated it to include both.

In 342, Roman emperors Constantius II and Constans decreed the death penalty for any male who "marries [a man] as a woman... [a situation in which] gender has lost its place". In 390, emperors Valentinian II, Theodosius I and Arcadius denounced males "acting the part of a woman", condemning those who were guilty of such acts to be publicly burned.

== The Middle Ages ==
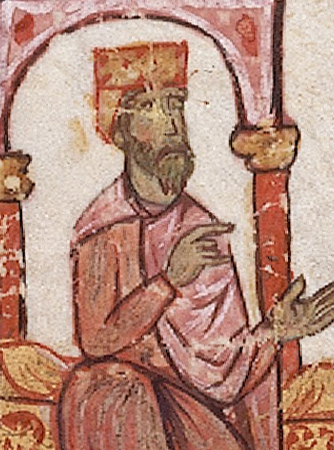
Basil I, Byzantine emperor from 867 to 886

Adelphopoiesis continued to be practiced throughout the Middle Ages, especially in the Greek-speaking Christian world. According to several biographies dated to within a century of his life, Basil I may have been a participant in such a same-sex union prior to his rise to power, but the evidence is disputed. The exact nature of such same-sex unions has been debated by scholars, as although they share parallels to the contemporary Christian understanding of heterosexual marriage, homosexuality was not considered socially acceptable. Despite this, they continued to be performed throughout the Middle Ages, often in churches.

John Boswell, in his essay The Church and the Homosexual, attributes Christianity's denunciations of "homosexuality" to an alleged rising intolerance in Europe throughout the 12th century, which he claims was also reflected in other ways. His premise is that when sodomy was not being explicitly and "officially" denounced, it was therefore being "tolerated". Historian R. W. Southern disagreed with Boswell's claims and wrote in 1990 that "the only relevant generalization which emerges from the penitential codes down to the eleventh century is that sodomy was treated on about the same level as copulation with animals." Southern further notes that "Boswell thinks that the omission of sodomy from the stringent new code of clerical celibacy issued by the Roman Council of 1059 implies a degree of tolerance. Countering this is the argument that the Council of 1059 had more urgent business on hand; and in any case, sodomy had been condemned by Leo IX at Rheims in 1049." Similarly, Pierre Payer asserted in 1984 that Boswell's thesis (as outlined in his Christianity, Social Tolerance, and Homosexuality) ignores an alleged wealth of condemnations found in the penitential literature prior to the 12th century. More recently, historian Allan Tulchin wrote in 2007 in the Journal of Modern History that, "It is impossible to prove either way and probably also somewhat irrelevant to understanding their way of thinking. They loved each other, and the community accepted that."

Peter Damian wrote the Liber Gomorrhianus, an extended attack on both homosexuality and masturbation. He portrayed homosexuality as a counter-rational force undermining morality, religion, and society itself, and in need of strong suppression lest it spread even and especially among clergy. Damian reports that even Otto III was intimate with many men (sharing the bed and bath).

Hildegard of Bingen reported seeing visions and recorded them in Scivias (short for Scito vias Domini, "Know the Ways of the Lord"). In Book II Vision Six, she quotes God as condemning same-sex intercourse, including lesbianism; "a woman who takes up devilish ways and plays a male role in coupling with another woman is most vile in My sight, and so is she who subjects herself to such a one in this evil deed". Her younger contemporary Alain de Lille personified the theme of sexual sin in opposition to nature in The Complaint of Nature by having Nature herself denounce sexual immorality and especially homosexuality as rebellion against her direction, terming it confusion between masculine and feminine and between subject and object. The Complaint also includes a striking description of the neglect of womanhood:

Though all the beauty of man humbles itself before the fairness of woman, being always inferior to her glory; though the face of the daughter of Tyndaris is brought into being and the comeliness of Adonis and Narcissus, conquered, adores her; for all this she is scorned, although she speaks as beauty itself, though her godlike grace affirms her to be a goddess, though for her the thunderbolt would fail in the hand of Jove, and every sinew of Apollo would pause and lie inactive, though for her the free man would become a slave, and Hippolytus, to enjoy her love, would sell his very chastity. Why do so many kisses lie untouched on maiden lips, and no one wish to gain a profit from them?

In the 13th century, Thomas Aquinas argued that not all things to which a person might be inclined are "natural" in the morally relevant sense; rather, only the inclination to the full and proper expression of the human nature, and inclinations which align with that inclination, are natural. Contrary inclinations are perversions of the natural in the sense that they do seek a good, but in a way destructive of good.

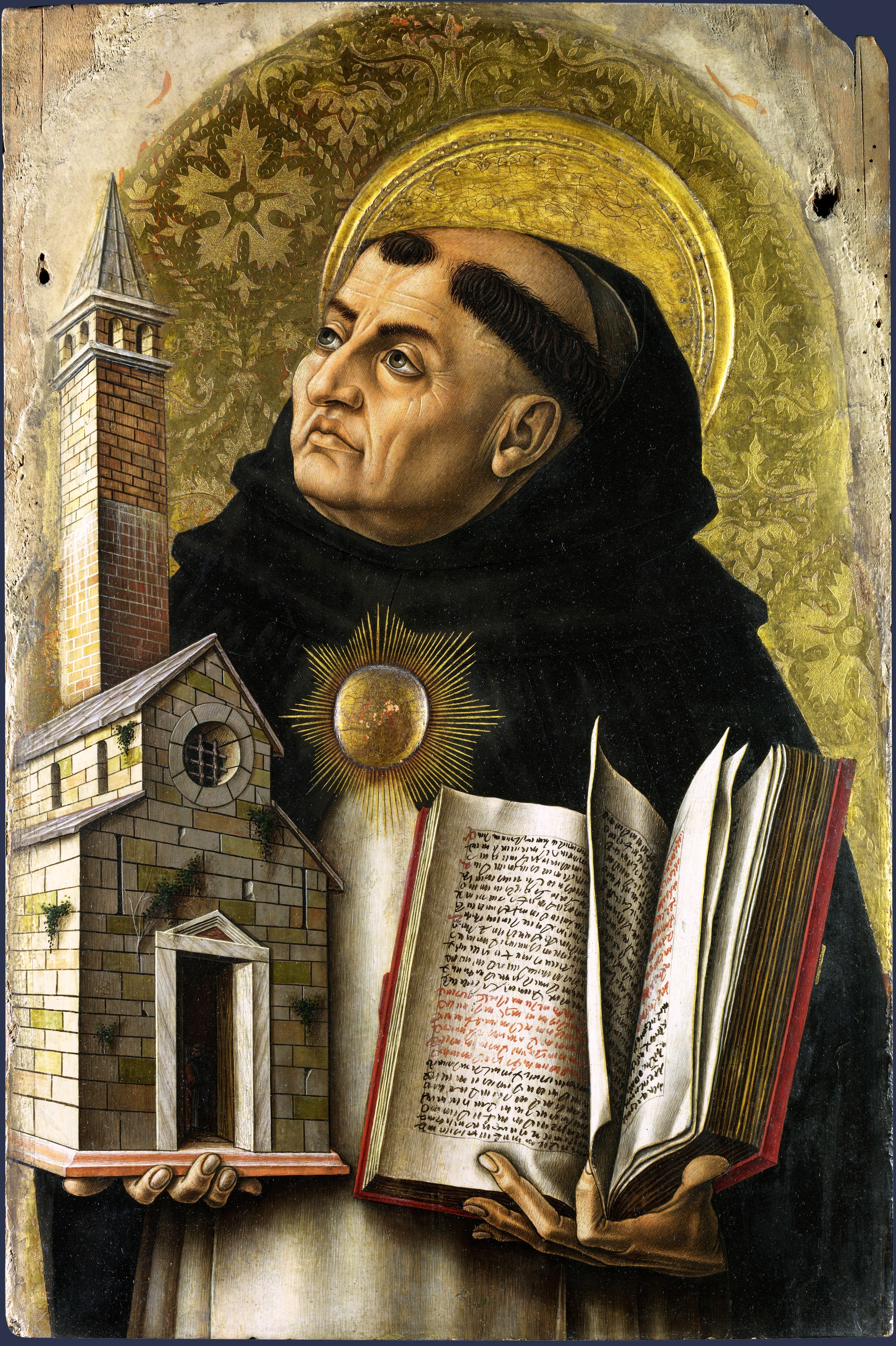
Saint Thomas Aquinas, Catholic theologian (1225–1274)

This view points from the natural to the Divine, because (following Aristotle) he said all people seek happiness; but according to Aquinas, happiness can only finally be attained through beatific vision. Therefore, all sins are also against the natural law. But the natural law of many aspects of life is knowable apart from special revelation by examining the forms and purposes of those aspects. It is in this sense that Aquinas considered homosexuality unnatural, since it involves a kind of partner other than the kind to which the purpose of sexuality points. He considered it comparable to heterosexual sex for pleasure (rather than reproduction).

The tone of the denunciations often indicate a more than theoretical concern. Archbishop Ralph of Tours had his lover John installed as Bishop of Orléans with agreement of both the King of France and Pope Urban II. In 1395 there was a transvestite homosexual prostitute arrested in London with some records surviving, and the Twelve Conclusions of the Lollards included the denunciation of priestly celibacy as a cause of sodomy.

Due to a lack of evidence, it is impossible to know the specifics surrounding the societal understanding of female homosexuality. The primary source of thought on lesbianism appears to have been Thomas Aquinas, who considered homosexual acts between women to be sins against nature, much the same as male homosexuality. Aside from Aquinas, mentions of homosexuality between women are very rare. Some scholars interpret this as a sign that lesbianism may have been almost intentionally ignored; the popular belief at the time seemed to be that women were not capable of desiring another woman more than a man, and that sex between a man and a woman was intrinsically superior to sex between two women, as women could not make up for the lack of a phallus.

Direct references to sodomy between women or to the persecution of homosexual women were rare, but there were some concerns regarding the behavior of nuns. The councils of Paris and Rouen, for example, disallowed nuns from sharing a bed or forming particularly close bonds of friendship with each other. Although these decisions do not explicitly mention concerns of same-sex attraction between nuns, Judith C. Brown argues in Immodest Acts: The Life of a Lesbian Nun in Renaissance Italy that they imply an awareness of potential homoeroticism.

There were, however, some writers who recommended penalties for homosexual acts between women. In most cases, these penalties tended to be more lenient than those levied against men involved in homosexuality. Theodore of Tarsus, for example, recommended three years penance for women who were guilty of homosexuality, as opposed to 10 years for men. This leniency was not true in every case, however. As the 16th century began, it became more common for lesbian acts to be prosecuted on the same level as male homosexuality, often punished with death.

== The Reformation and Counter-Reformation ==
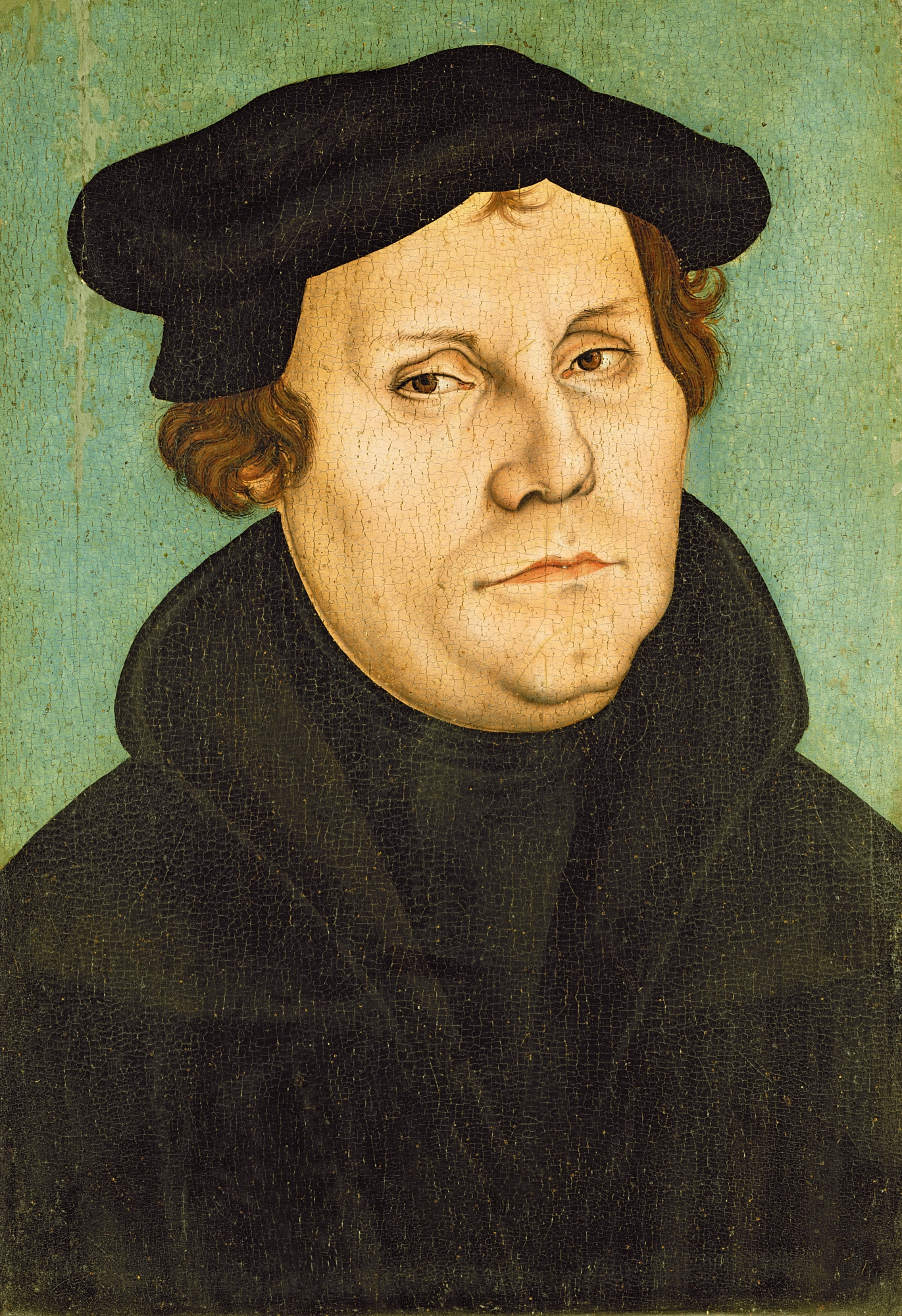
Martin Luther, seminal figure of Protestant Reformation (1483–1562)

Leading up to the Reformation, Western European views on homosexuality became increasingly hostile; the exact reason for this change is unclear. Martin Luther's view of homosexuality is recorded in Plass's What Luther Says:

The vice of the Sodomites is an unparalleled enormity. It departs from the natural passion and desire, planted into nature by God, according to which the male has a passionate desire for the female. Sodomy craves what is entirely contrary to nature. Whence comes this perversion? Without a doubt it comes from the devil. After a man has once turned aside from the fear of God, the devil puts such great pressure upon his nature that he extinguishes the fire of natural desire and stirs up another, which is contrary to nature.

This view of sodomy as the greatest sin one could commit became common throughout the Christian world. Sodomy was increasingly referred to as "the sin that cannot be named," as the subject became too taboo to be specifically mentioned. Part of the revulsion associated with homosexual acts could be related to the fact that, in many cultures, sodomy was seen as simply an action which any man may commit if he allowed himself to indulge his vices. In Elizabethan England, for example, defendants accused of sodomy often claimed drunkenness as a defense of their actions, a common defense for a wide variety of crimes.

As sodomy became more of a concern, it began to be punished harshly. When uncovered, cases of sodomy were investigated thoroughly, and were often punished with death or banishment. In some Swiss cases, there was communication between cities to alert each other to locations of homosexual activities. In others, arrest warrants were distributed in order to catch suspects. This communication continued even after the Reformation, as concerns regarding homosexuality were prominent among both Catholic and Protestant Christians.

Same-sex relationships between men occurred between a wide variety of partners. Some were adolescent, other cases involved both partners belonging to a lower social class, and others were between one higher class partner and one of a slightly lower social standing. The occurrences which included class-disparity were often accompanied by opportunities for the partner with a lower social standing, including gifts, monetary compensation, or favors from the upper-class partner. Werner Steiner, a major figure early in the Reformation who was convicted of sodomy near the end of his life, was found to have provided monetary gifts and clothing to his lower-class partner. He was sentenced to house arrest, where he stayed for the remainder of his life.

In many cases, sodomy was seen as a sin which represented treason against God, as same-sex activities were believed to oppose the natural order of the world. Because of this, accusations of sodomy were frequently used as tools to defame or delegitimize political opponents. As sodomy was viewed as a lustful sin to which anybody might fall prey, nobody was safe from accusations of sodomy, and because of the seriousness of such accusations, they were an incredibly powerful weapon to use against political opposition.

=== Premodern female homoeroticism ===
Benedetta Carlini (1590–1661) was one of the only women whose homosexual activities were documented. Benedetta was a nun, later an abbess, in Pescia, Italy, where she experienced many visions which she believed to be messages from God. They culminated in a vision which directed her to decorate the church in preparation for a marriage ceremony, in which Benedetta would be married to Christ. Following this event, there was an investigation which determined her visions to be true. A second investigation was later conducted which determined her visions to be false and uncovered a sexual relationship between Benedetta and another nun, Bartolomea. The relationship was revealed during interviews between Bartolomea and the investigators, in which she gave detailed descriptions of their encounters, which took place over several years. She described how Benedetta would be possessed by an angel during the encounters, and claimed to have been forced to participate. Benedetta was imprisoned in the convent for 35 years until she died, while Bartolomea appears to have been punished to a much lesser degree.

In general, however, same-sex relationships between women have not been as well-documented as male homosexuality. There are very few existing references to the prosecution of women for homosexuality, as opposed to the prevalence of prosecutions for male homosexuality. Several theologians wrote on the topic of homosexual activity between women. The sources tend to agree that female homosexual acts constitute sins, but disagree on specific points, resulting in a wide variety of beliefs. These ranged from the classification of female homosexuality as a sin against nature — "in which the sexual act was directed solely at pleasure and did not permit procreation" — to the complete opposite, classifying them as fornication, or sins of lust that were not unnatural.

Although same-sex attraction and relationships did occur, the term lesbian was not in use until the 20th century, and earlier discussions of same-sex attraction between women approached the topic from a "radically different" framework than in the modern era. In some areas, such as France, women were punished under sodomy, while in others, such as England, they were not. There was also further debate about what constituted sodomy between women, such as medical texts which posited that only women with particularly large clitorises could commit sodomy, in order to make up for the lack of a male participant. The most common views tended to constitute the idea that women's same-sex relations were a problem specifically when it defied gender roles, allowing a woman to assume the role of a man. The existence of independent lesbian desire which is commonly accepted in the modern era was not possible to understand in this framework.

The European view of sex could be described as phallocentric, as the male sex organ was considered to be central to the act of sex. From this perspective, sexual acts between women only existed to substitute for a lack of availability of sexual relationships with men. Pre-modern European society tended to have the view that women were more susceptible to promiscuity than men, as they were considered to be more lustful than men. Accusations of witchcraft, which often included allegations of seduction by the devil, sometimes to the point of intercourse, were much more common than accusations of sodomy between women.

== Diverging opinions in modern era ==
Historically, Christian churches have regarded homosexual sex as sinful, based on the Catholic understanding of the natural law and traditional interpretations of certain passages in the Bible. This position is today affirmed by groups representing most Christians, including the Catholic Church (1.4 billion members), Orthodox Church (250 million members), and some Protestant denominations, especially most Pentecostal churches, Evangelical churches such as the Southern Baptist Convention (16.3 million members). In November 2022 the LDS Church (nearly 17 million members) came out in support of the U.S. government protecting same-sex marriage. The message towards homosexuals by one large evangelical church located West South-Central region of America is thus, "THE BATTLE CRY has been sounded, the fight has been started, and the stones have been thrown. Indeed, the nation is once again divided, and the war for the soul of America has begun! So, how should a Christian fight? That fight should certainly not be with hate because it is not the sinner whom God hates; rather, it is his sin. It is homosexuality that we are against, not the homosexual."

However, a minority interpret biblical passages differently and argue that homosexuality can be seen as morally acceptable. This approach has been taken by several denominations in North America, notably the United Church of Canada (2.8 million members), the United Church of Christ (1.1 million members), the Moravian Church (825,000 members), the Anglican Episcopal church (1.8 million members), the Anglican Church of Canada (800,000 members), the Liberal Catholic Church, Friends General Conference, the Presbyterian Church (U.S.A.) (1.9 million members), the Evangelical Lutheran Church in America (3.9 million members) and the Evangelical Lutheran Church in Canada. Relatively many denominations had taken this approach in Europe including united, reformed and Lutheran churches: the Evangelical Church in Germany (24.5 million members), Church of Sweden (6.6 million members), Church of Norway, Church of Denmark, Protestant Church of the Netherlands (3.9 million members), Church of Iceland, United Protestant Church in Belgium, United Protestant Church of France, Federation of Swiss Protestant Churches, Methodist Church of Great Britain (330,000 members), Church of Scotland and United Methodist Church

The Metropolitan Community Church was founded in 1968 serve the Christian LGBTQ community. Smaller LGBT-friendly Christian denominations have also been founded, such as the Ecumenical Catholic Church and several independent Catholic Churches.

Individual Christians maintain a variety of beliefs on this subject that may or may not correspond to their official church doctrines. Some mainline Protestant denominations in the United States have also removed language in their bylaws which suggest that homosexuality is a sinful state of being. The Book of Order used by the PCUSA reflects this change. Similar modifications in position can also be seen in the Lutheran ELCA and Disciples of Christ. Although acceptance of sexually active LGBTQ laity has increased in terms of actual practice and in terms of church law, some of these denominations continue to limit leadership and clergy roles for LGBTQ persons. A number of denominations, like the aforementioned United Methodists, remain divided over the issues relating to homosexuality, with a large number of members pushing for changes in the church's Book of Discipline to allow for full inclusion of LGBT persons in the life of the church.

In 1988, The Evangelical Network was formed with LGBT Evangelical Christians. It is a network of churches, ministries and Christian workers.

As of 2026, homosexuality is criminalized in 25 Christian-majority countries, they are Burundi, Cameroon, Eritrea, Eswatini, Ethiopia, Ghana, Grenada, Guyana, Jamaica, Kenya, Kiribati, Liberia, Malawi, Papua New Guinea, Samoa, Solomon Islands, Saint Vincent and the Grenadines, South Sudan, Tanzania, Togo, Tonga, Tuvalu, Uganda, Zambia, and Zimbabwe. Out of all of these countries, 15 of them are in Africa, 5 of them are in the Americas, and 6 are in Oceania. Since 2023, in Uganda, "aggravated homosexuality" is punishable by death, with homosexuality punishable by life imprisonment. It is the only Christian-majority country to make any act of homosexuality punishable by death. In Guyana, Tanzania, and Zambia, homosexuality is punishable by life imprisonment. In Eswatini, Ghana, Grenada, Guyana, Jamaica, Kiribati, Papua New Guinea, Samoa, Tonga, Trinidad and Tobago, Tuvalu, and Zimbabwe, only male homosexuality is criminalized. In 2009, Burundi became the first Christian-majority country in the 21st century to criminalize homosexuality. Though in recent years, the number is decreasing, with Gabon in 2020 (after briefly criminalizing it in 2019), Angola in 2021 (along with Bhutan), Antigua and Barbuda, Barbados, Saint Kitts and Nevis in 2022 (along with Singapore), Cook Islands in 2023 (along with Mauritius), Dominica, Namibia, and Niue in 2024, Saint Lucia in 2025, and Trinidad and Tobago in 2026 (after initially decriminalizing in 2018 and briefly criminalizing in 2025-2026).

== See also ==
- Side A, Side B, Side X, Side Y (theological views)
- Gay bishops
- LGBT-affirming religious groups
- Queer theology
- Unitarian Universalism and LGBTQ persons
- Christian saints sometimes identified as homosexual:
  - Sergius and Bacchus (4th century martyrs)
  - Aelred of Rievaulx (12th century monk)
