= Derrick Sherwin Bailey =

- Born: 30 June 1910; Alcester, England
- Died: 9 February 1984 (aged 73)
- Education: Alcester Grammar School

Derrick Sherwin Bailey (30 June 1910 – 9 February 1984) was an English Christian theologian, born at Alcester in Warwickshire, whose 1955 work Homosexuality and the Western Christian Tradition paved the way for the production of the 1957 Wolfenden report and for the Parliament of the United Kingdom's decriminalization of homosexuality in England and Wales a decade later.

== Early life ==
Bailey was born at Moors, Alcester, Warwickshire, to William Thomas Bailey, a railway signalman- which influenced his son's interest in the railways- and his wife Ellen Mary (née Taylor). He was educated at Alcester Grammar School, then Lincoln Theological College. He was ordained as an Anglican priest in 1943- and the University of Edinburgh (Ph.D. 1947).

== Career ==
Recognised as the church's leading expert on sexual ethics,

"Under the guidance of the Rev. Dr. Derrick Sherwin Bailey (1910-84), a group of clergy, doctors and lawyers studied the existing materials on homosexuality. They then produced a privately printed pamphlet titled The Problem of Homosexuality. This interim report, written by Bailey, signalled the first twentieth-century extended treatment of homosexuality by an ecclesiastical body. Not only did it examine the current medical, psychological, and sociological literature, but it also sought to address the role of the Church of England in the issue of reforming the law. The Moral Welfare Council recognized the role of the State in regulating society, but it also acknowledged that the rights of the homosexual were being violated, and this issue needed to be addressed.

"Bailey's writings helped the Church of England to respond to the theological issue of homosexuality, to homosexuals themselves, as well as to the laws of England. This 1954-5 period in the Moral Welfare Council provided important conceptual guidelines for subsequent discussions about homosexuality, not only in the Church of England but throughout Christendom."

While working on the pamphlet, Bailey independently completed Homosexuality and the Western Christian Tradition. It was criticized for exonerating the Church for persecuting homosexuals, yet it is still considered a landmark work on this topic. He scrutinized both the Bible and subsequent thought, drawing focus to some heretofore ignored issues, such as intertestamental literature, legislation of Christian emperors, the penitentials, and the link between heresy and sodomy.

Bailey testified to the Wolfenden Committee in support of the reform of the laws on homosexuality. The historian Patrick Higgins describes some of Bailey's other views an "interesting cocktail of beliefs". Higgins lists Bailey as believing that homosexuality will eventually disappear "because he thought that modern people would create better marriages, which in turn would make better homes, producing children who would naturally follow the right sexual path". He also proposed that homosexual men should be invited into the homes of married heterosexuals in order so that the heterosexuals could "share some of their joy with them". While he believes male homosexuality to be pitied rather than criminalised, Higgins reports that he had little sympathy with lesbians: he considered lesbianism "socially more undesirable than male homosexuality".

Between 1951 and 1955, he was Central Lecturer to the Church of England Moral Welfare Council.

In 1962 Bailey became a Canon Residentiary (also Prebendary, Chancellor, and Precentor) of Wells Cathedral, publishing works on its history and dying in the city of Wells, Somerset.

== Bibliography ==
- Dynes, Wayne; Donaldson, Stephen, eds. (1992). Studies in Homosexuality, Vol XII: Homosexuality and Religion and Philosophy. New York; London: Garland. pp. 152–173.
- Dynes, Wayne R., ed. (1990). "Bailey, Derrick Sherwin". Encyclopedia of Homosexuality. New York; London: Garland. pp. 103–4. Archived from the original on 22 February 2006.
