= Sergius and Bacchus =

Early Christian martyrs and saints

Saints Sergius and Bacchus
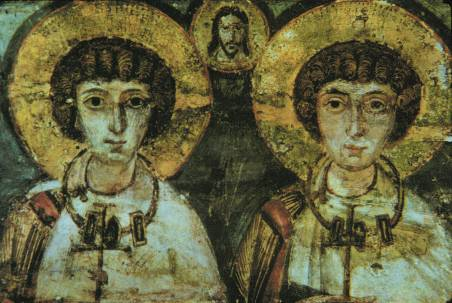
- Detail of a 7th-century icon of Saints Sergius and Bacchus

Martyrs
- Died: 4th century Bacchus in Syria; Sergius at Resafa, Syria
- Venerated in: Church of the East; Eastern Orthodox Church; Catholic Church; Oriental Orthodox Church
- Major shrine: Basilica of St. Sergius, Rasafa
- Feast: 7 October
- Attributes: Roman soldiers bearing palm branches
- Patronage: Arabs, Arab Christians, Ghassanids, Syria, army, soldiers

Sergius (or Serge) and Bacchus (Ancient Greek: Σέργιος και Βάκχος, romanized: Sérgios kai Bắkkhos; Classical Syriac: ܣܪܓܝܤ ܘܒܟܘܤ, romanized: Sargīs wa Bākūs; Arabic: سركيس و باخوس, romanized: Sarkīs wa Bākhūs, also called Arabic: سرجيس و باكوس, romanized: Sarjīs wa Bākūs) were fourth-century Syrian Christian soldiers revered as martyrs and military saints by the Catholic, Eastern Orthodox and Oriental Orthodox Churches. Their feast day is 7 October.

According to their hagiography, Sergius and Bacchus were military officers in the army of the Roman Emperor Galerius and were held high in his favor until they were exposed as secret Christians. They were then severely humiliated and punished, forced to wear both feminine and commoner garments, with Bacchus dying during torture to his feet, and Sergius eventually decapitated.

Sergius and Bacchus were very popular throughout Late Antiquity for their fraternal and pious relationship, and churches in their honor were built in several cities, including Constantinople and Rome. The close friendship between the two is strongly emphasized in their hagiographies and traditions, making them one of the most famous examples of paired Christian saints. This closeness led the historian John Boswell to suggest that their relationship was a romantic one; though other historians have widely rejected this theory, it has led to popular veneration of Sergius and Bacchus in the gay Christian community.

== Legend ==
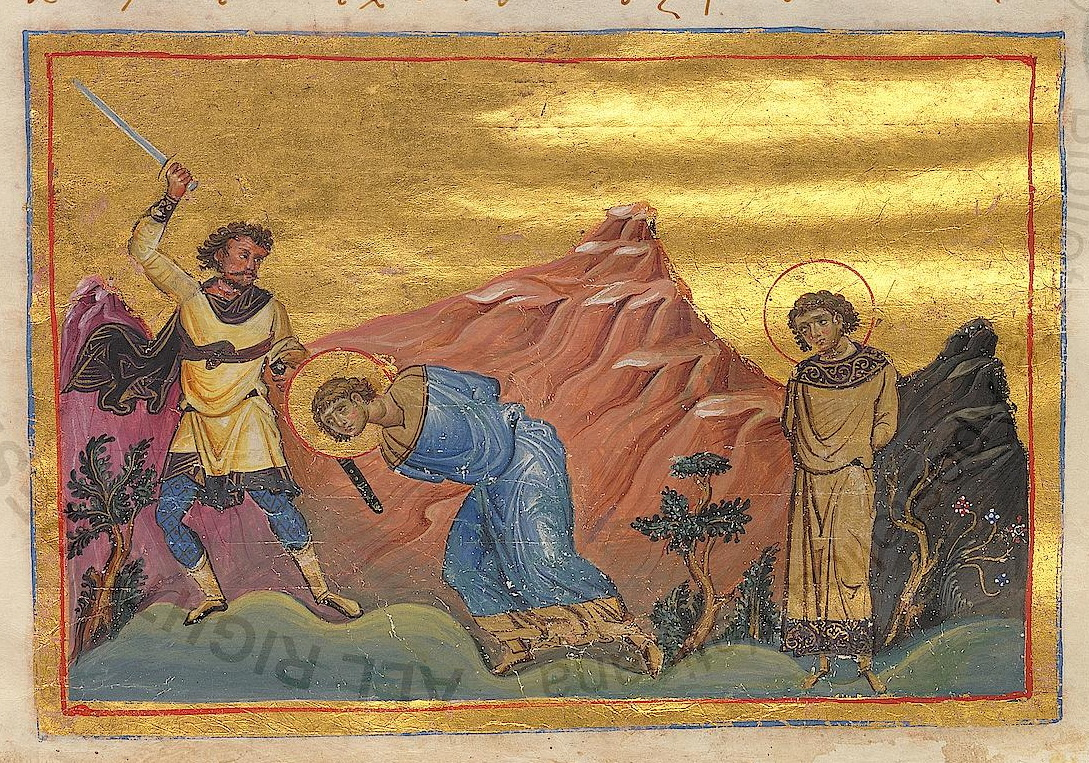
Martyrs Saints Sergius and Bacchus

The story of Sergius and Bacchus is told in the Greek text known as The Passion of Sergius and Bacchus. The story is ostensibly set during the reign of Roman emperor Galerius (305 to 311), though it contains a number of contradictions and anachronisms that make dating difficult. The work itself may date to the mid-5th century.

According to the text, Sergius and Bacchus were Roman citizens and high-ranking officers of the Roman army, but their conversion to Christianity was discovered when they attempted to avoid accompanying a Roman official into a pagan temple with the rest of his bodyguard. After they persisted in refusing to sacrifice to Jupiter in Galerius's presence, they were publicly humiliated by being chained, dressed in female attire and paraded around town. Galerius then sent them to Barbalissos in Mesopotamia to be tried by Antiochus, the military commander there and an old friend of Sergius. Antiochus could not convince them to give up their faith, however, and Bacchus was beaten to death. The next day, Bacchus's spirit appeared to Sergius and encouraged him to remain strong so they could be together forever. Over the next days, Sergius was also brutally tortured and finally executed at Resafa, where his death was marked by miraculous happenings.

== Popularity and veneration ==
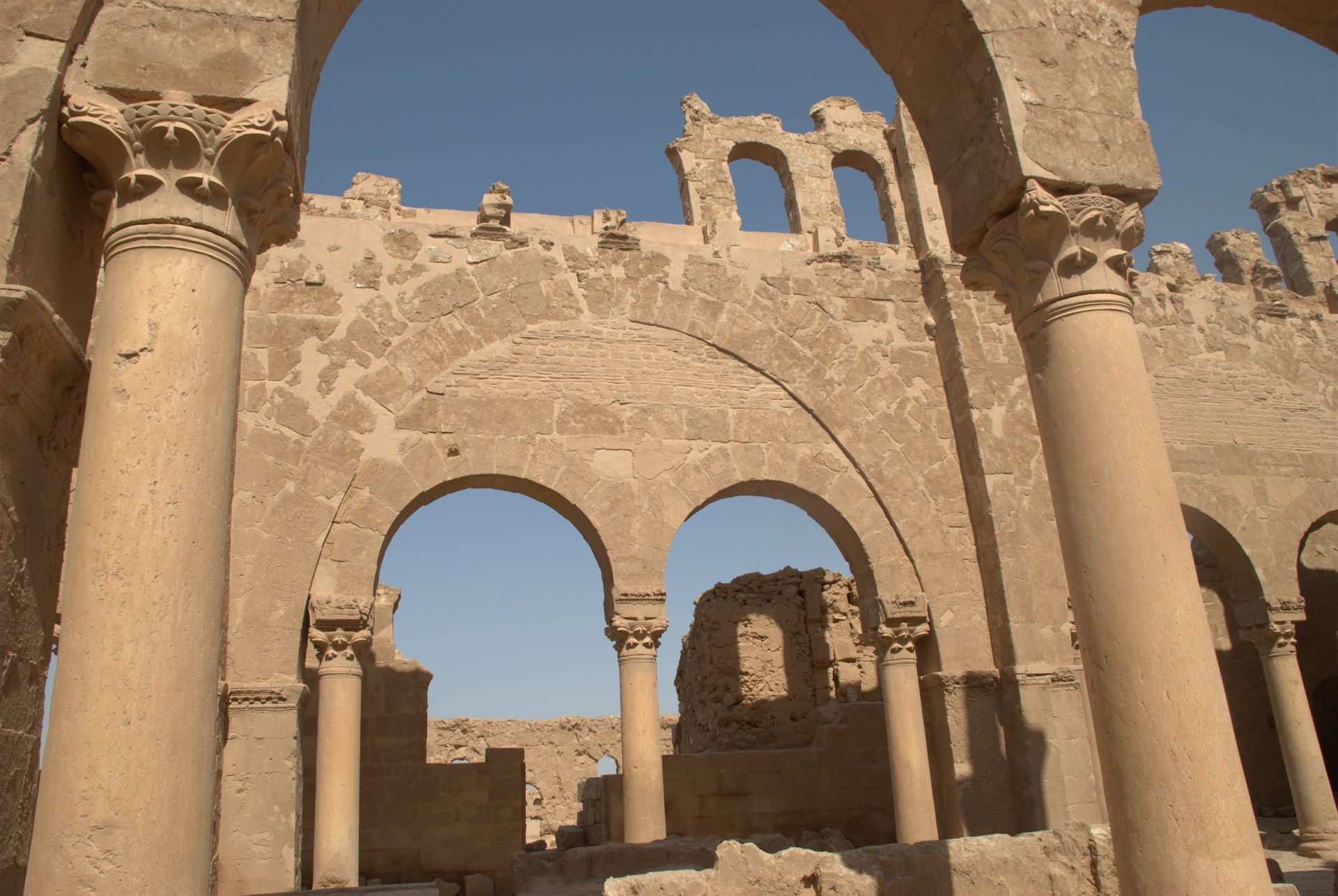
Basilica of Saint Sergius, Rasafa, Syria

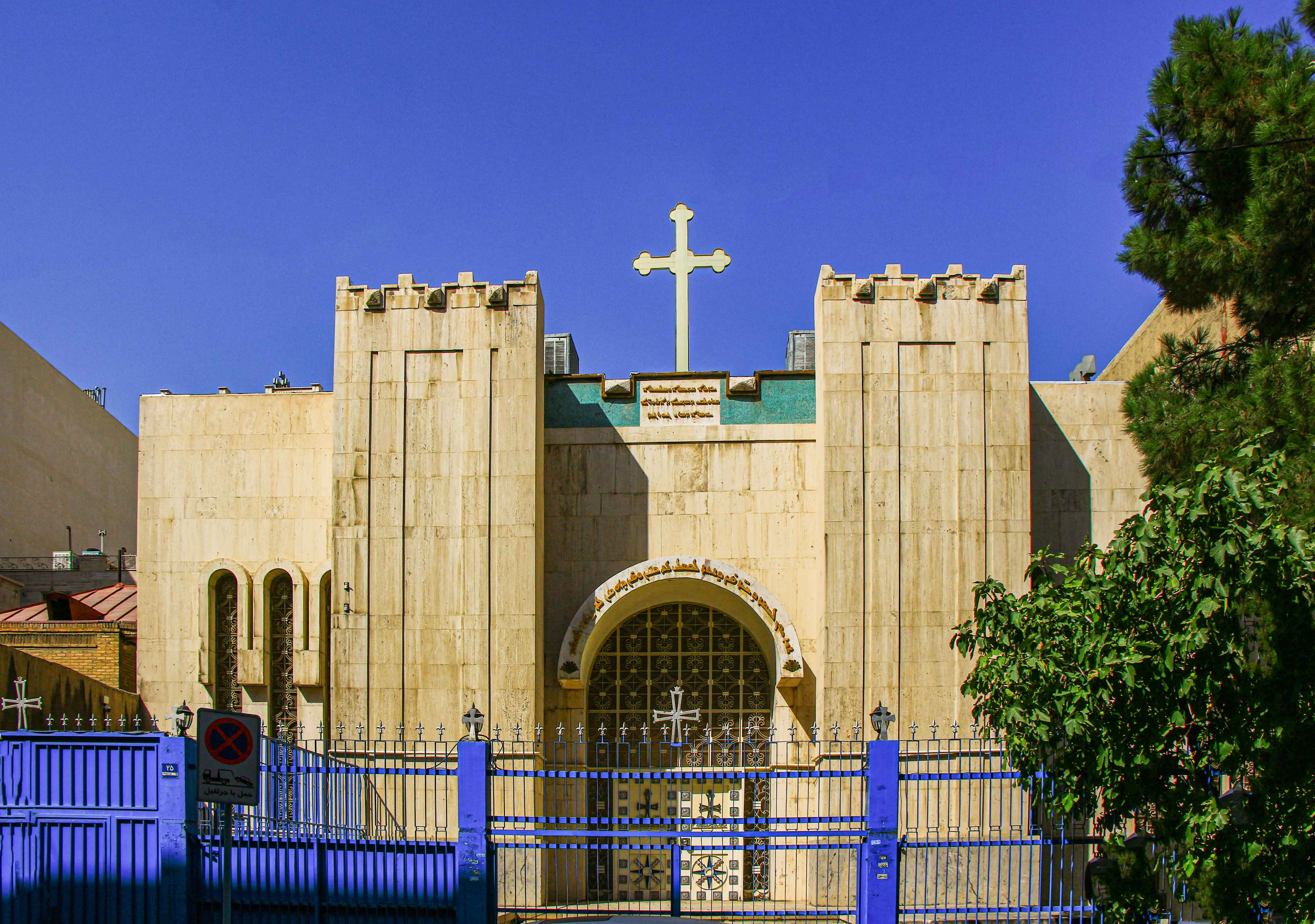
Assyrian Church of the East of Mar Sarkis (Saint Sergius), Tehran

Veneration of Sergius and Bacchus dates to the fifth century. A shrine to Sergius was built in Resafa (renamed Sergiopolis around 425), but there is no certain evidence for his or Bacchus's cult much older than that. Their cult grew rapidly during the early fifth century, in accordance with the growth of the cult of martyrs, especially military martyrs, during the period. The Resafa shrine was constructed of mudbrick, evidently at the behest of bishop Alexander of Hierapolis. The Passion has been dated to the mid-5th century on the grounds that it describes the construction of such a shrine as if it were a relatively recent occurrence. The original shrine was replaced with a sturdier stone structure in 518; this new site was patronized by important political figures including Roman emperor Justinian I, emperor Khosrow II of the Sasanian Empire, and al-Mundhir III ibn al-Harith, ruler of the Ghassanids.

Traditionally, the feast day of Sergius and Bacchus has been celebrated on 7 October in the West. In the Tridentine calendar they shared the day with Pope Mark and the martyred pair Marcellus and Apuleius. In 1716, this day became the feast of Our Lady of the Rosary, and the commemoration of Sergius, Bacchus and the other saints was moved to 8 October. They were restored to 7 October in 1969.

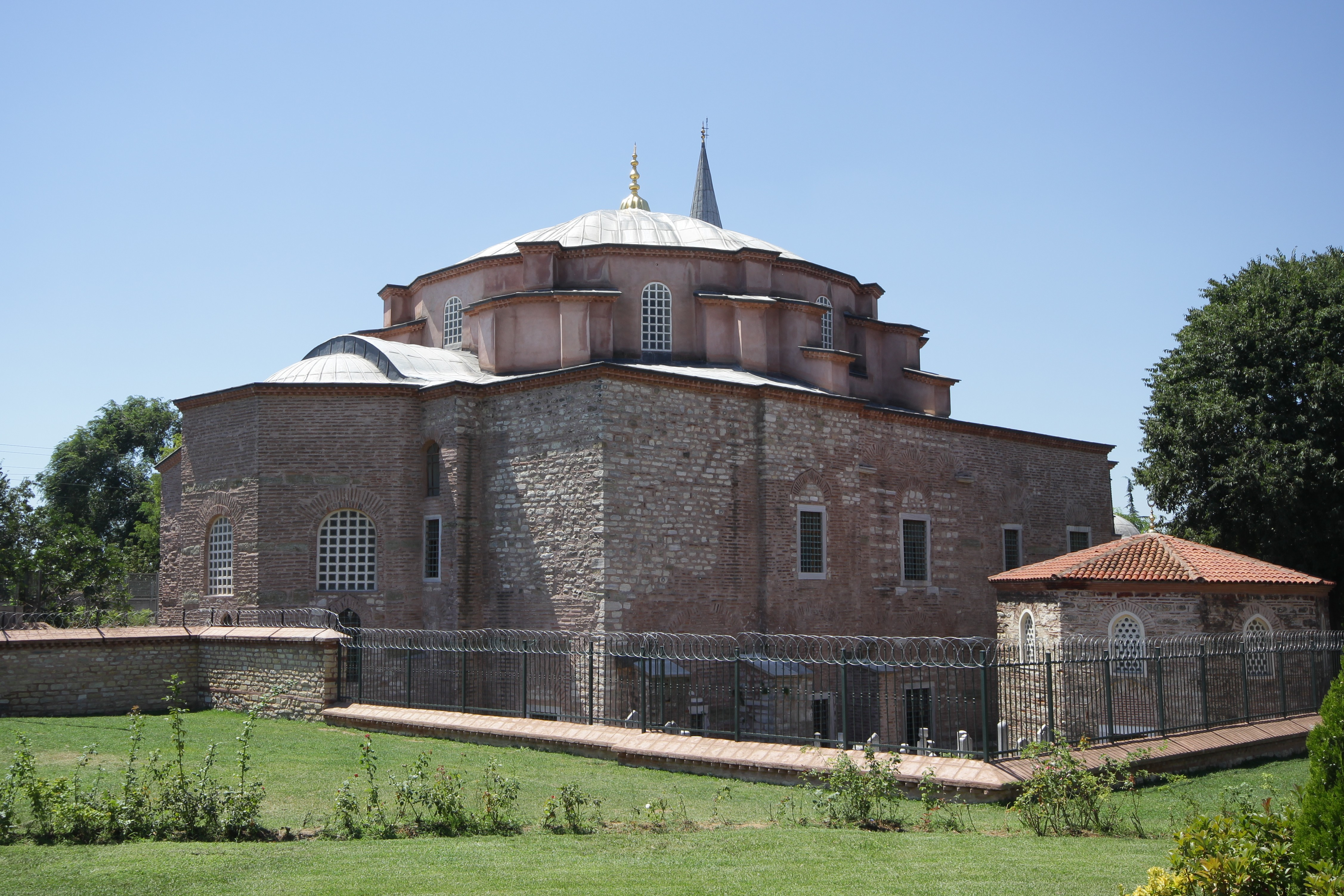
Little Hagia Sophia (Church of the Saints Sergius and Bacchus), Istanbul, Turkey

In the Byzantine Empire, they were venerated as protectors of the army. A large monastery church, the Little Hagia Sophia, was dedicated to them in Constantinople by Justinian I, probably in 527. According to legend, during the reign of Justin I, his nephew Justinian had been accused of plotting against the throne and was sentenced to death, which was reversed after Sergius and Bacchus appeared before Justin and vouched for Justinian's innocence. He was freed and restored to his title of Caesar. Justinian, in gratitude, vowed that he would dedicate a church to the saints once he became emperor. The construction of this Church of Saints Sergius and Bacchus, between 527 and 536 AD (only a short time before the erection of the Hagia Sophia between 532 and 537), was one of the first acts of the reign of Justinian I.

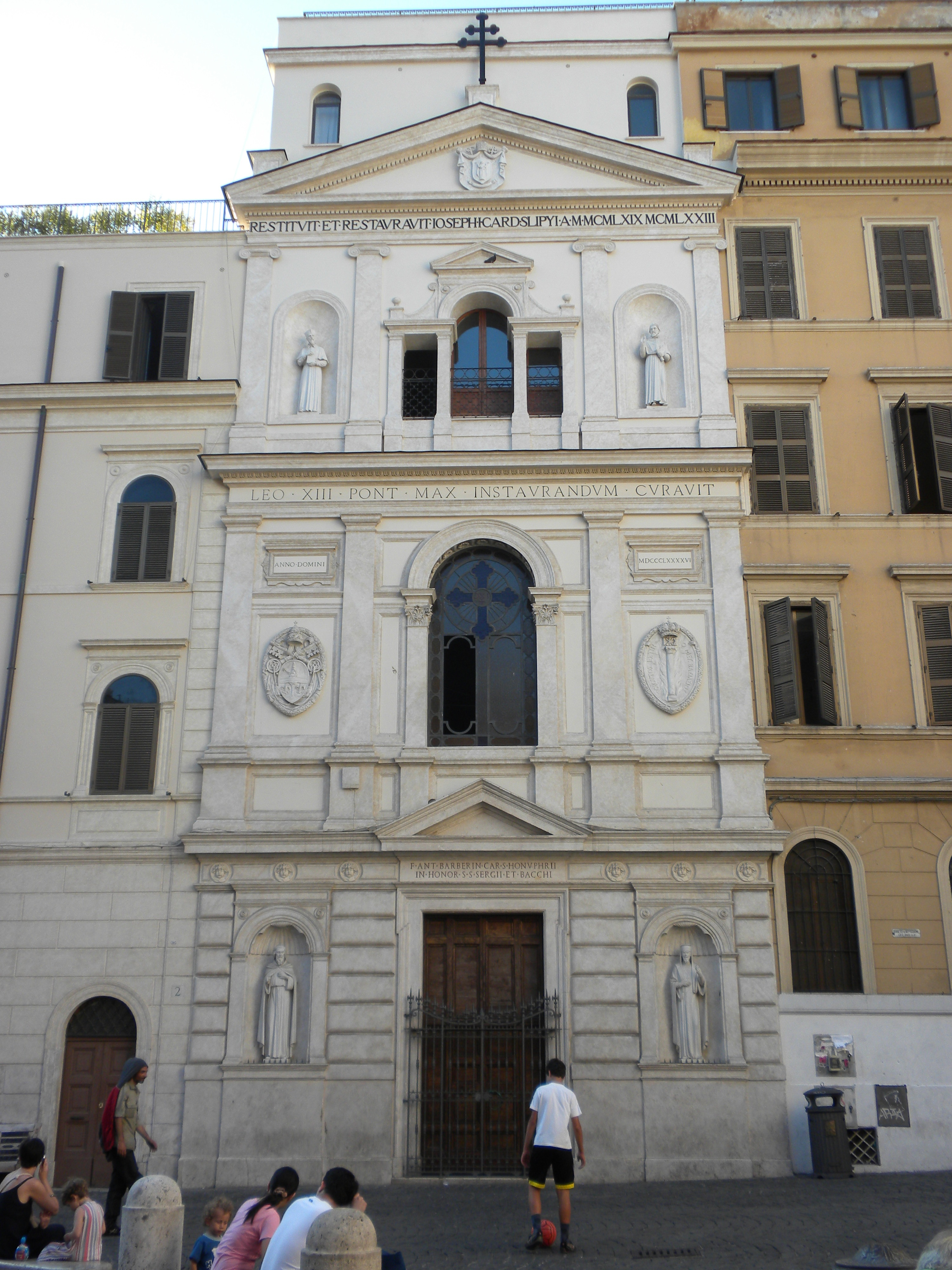
Church of Saints Sergius and Bacchus, Rome, Italy

Sergius was a very popular saint in Syria and Christian Arabia. The city of Resafa, which became a bishop's see, took the name Sergiopolis and preserved his relics in a fortified basilica. Resafa was improved by Emperor Justinian and became one of the greatest pilgrimage centers in the East. Many other churches were built dedicated in the name of Sergius, sometimes with Bacchus. A church dedicated to Santi Sergio e Bacco was built in Rome in the 9th century. Christian art represents the two saints as soldiers in military garb with branches of palm in their hands. Their feast is observed on 7 October, and a Mass is assigned to them in the "Sacramentarium" of Pope Gelasius. The nomads of the desert looked upon Sergius as their special patron saint.

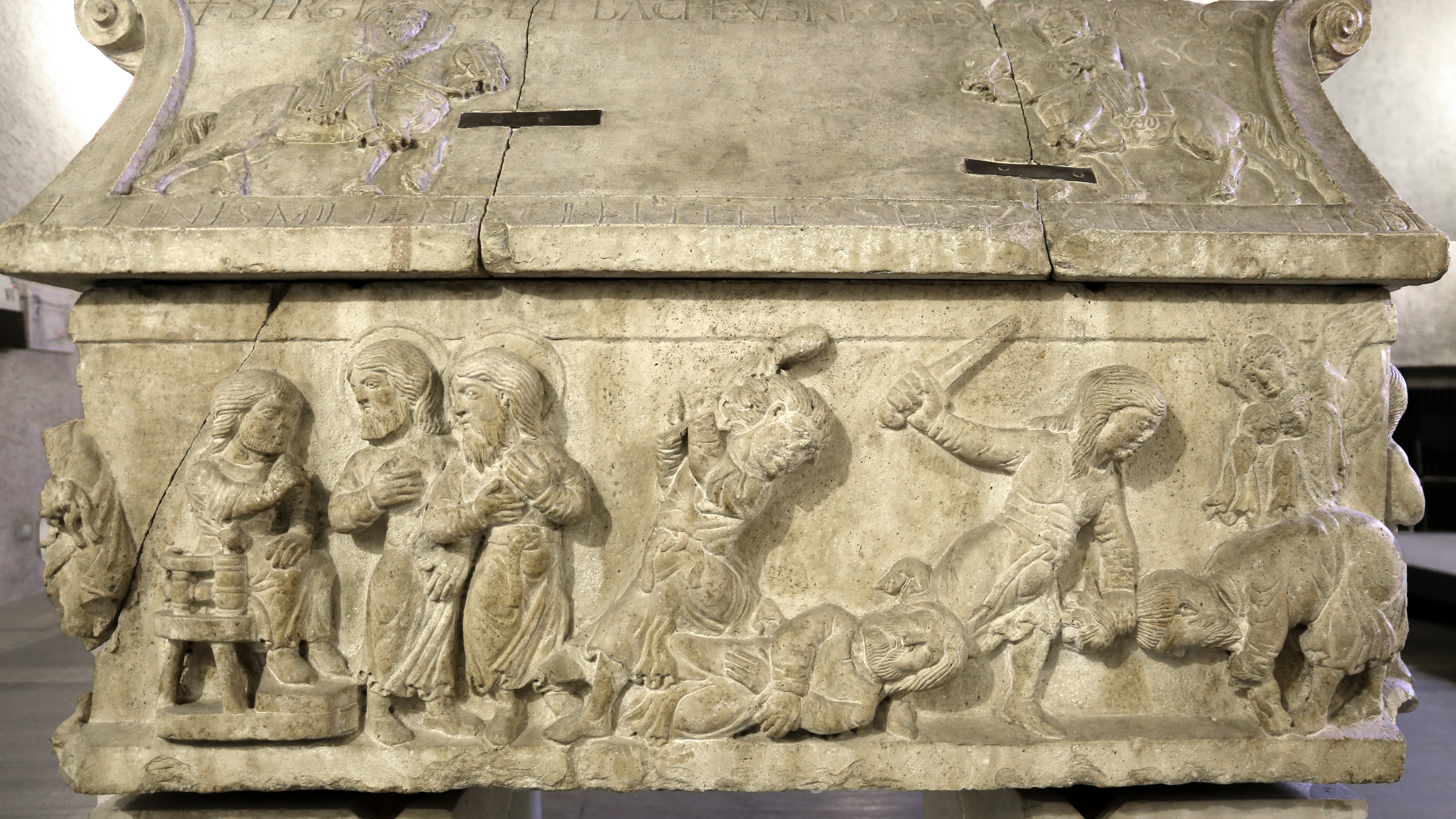
A sarcophagus of Sergius and Bacchus

A marble sarcophagus dedicated to Sergius and Bacchus and dating from 1179 is in the Castelvecchio Museum in Verona. An inscription on the side says it was commissioned by Boniface, Abbot of the Abbey of St Sergius in Nogara.

In the Armenian Church traditions, Sergius, or Sarkis, was venerated as a Christian general in the Roman army. He was martyred with his son, Martyros, for witnessing to their faith in Christ. The feast is preceded by three-day fasting where most abstain of food and water.

The close friendship between the two is strongly emphasized in their hagiographies and traditions, making them one of the most famous examples of paired saints; the scholar John Boswell considers them to be the most influential set of such an archetype, more so than even Peter and Paul.

In his Same-Sex Unions in Premodern Europe, Boswell further argues that Sergius and Bacchus' relationship can be understood as having a romantic dimension, noting that the oldest text of their martyrology describes them as erastai, which can be translated as "lovers". He suggested that the two were even united in a rite known as adelphopoiesis or "brother-making", which he argued was a type of early Christian same-sex union or blessing, reinforcing his view of tolerant early Christian attitudes toward homosexuality. Boswell's methodology and conclusions were criticized by many historians.

Regardless, in the wake of Boswell's work, Sergius and Bacchus have become popularly venerated in the gay Christian community. A 1994 icon of Sergius and Bacchus by the gay Franciscan iconographer Robert Lentz, first displayed at Chicago's Gay Pride Parade, has become a popular gay symbol.

== Historicity ==
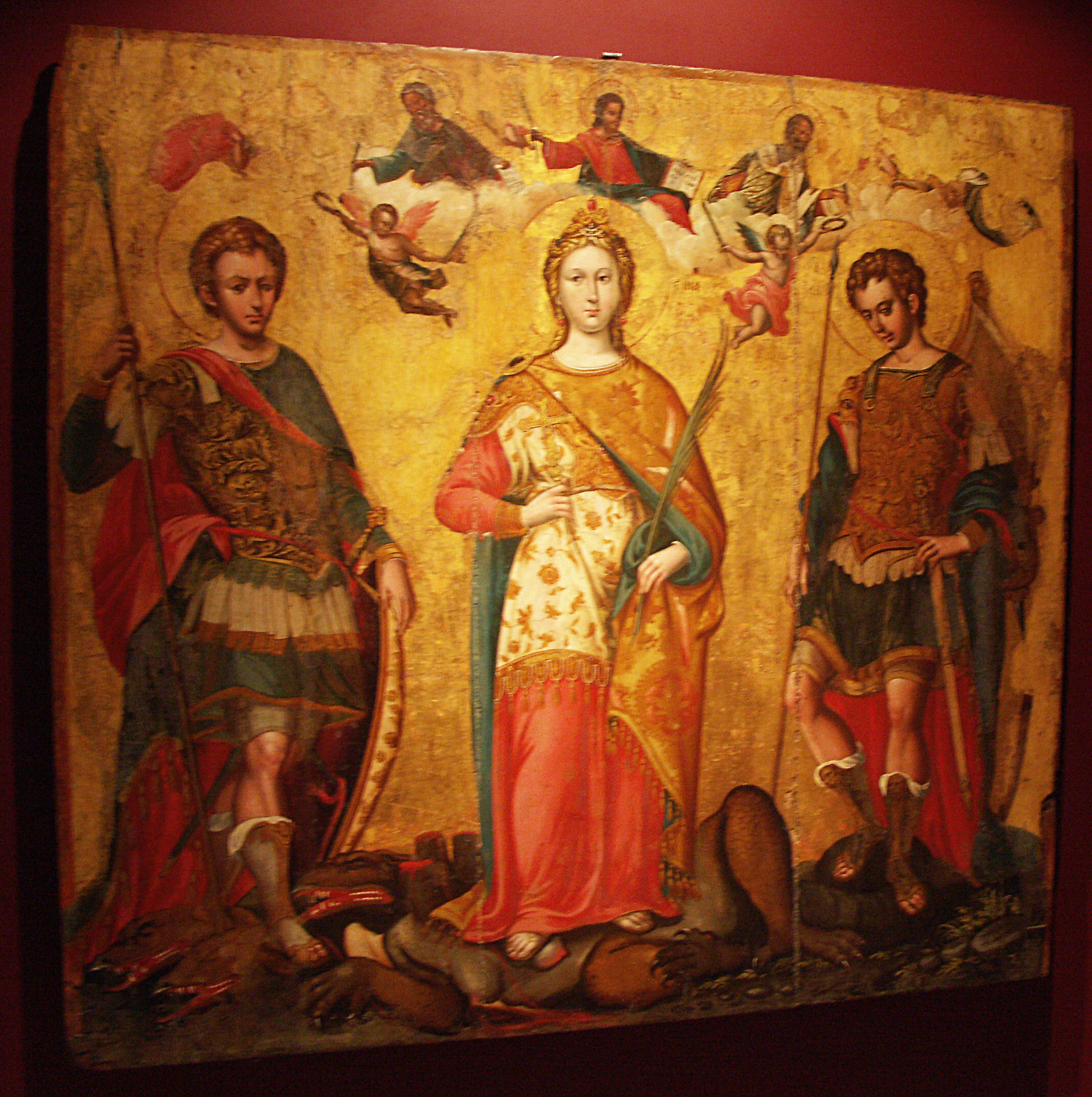
Saints Sergius and Bacchus as the guardians of Saint Justina of Padua by Michael Damaskinos

The Passion of Sergius and Bacchus has been dismissed as an unreliable historical source. It has been dated to mid-5th century and there is no evidence for the cult of Sergius and Bacchus before 425, over a century after they are said to have died. There is no evidence for Sergius and Bacchus's schola gentilium having been used by Galerius or any other emperor before Constantine I, given that the persecution of Christians had begun in the army considerably before the 4th century. Christopher Walter considers Sergius analogous to Saint George, "whose historicity is accepted, even if nothing genuine about his life is known." He accepts that information in the passion is accurate. Italian scholar Pio Franchi de Cavalieri has put forth that The Passion of Sergius and Bacchus was based on an earlier lost passion of Juventinus and Maximinus, two saints martyred under Emperor Julian the Apostate in 363. He noted especially that the punishment of being paraded around in women's clothes reflected the treatment of Christian soldiers by Julian.

== Bibliography ==
- Attwater, Donald and Catherine Rachel John. The Penguin Dictionary of Saints. 3rd edition. New York: Penguin Books, 1993. ISBN 0-14-051312-4.
- E. Key Fowden, The Barbarian Plain: Saint Sergius between Rome and Iran, The Transformation of the Classical Heritage 28 (Berkeley, 1999).
- D. Woods, 'The Emperor Julian and the Passion of Sergius and Bacchus', Journal of Early Christian Studies 5 (1997), 335–67.
- Boswell, John. Same-Sex Unions in Premodern Europe New York: Villard Books, 1994. ISBN 0-679-43228-0.
