= Adelphopoiesis =

Medieval Christian ceremony

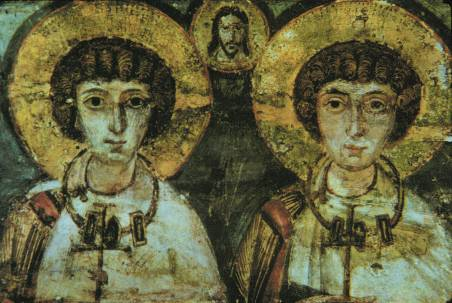
The Christian martyrs Saint Sergius and Saint Bacchus, noted for their friendship in Christ, were cited in church adelphopoiesis ceremonies.

Adelphopoiesis or adelphopoiia (from the Greek ἀδελφοποίησις/ἀδελφοποιία, derived from ἀδελφός, adelphos, lit. 'brother', and ποιέω, poieō, lit. 'I make', literally 'brother-making') is a ceremony practiced historically in Eastern Christian tradition to unite together two people of the same sex (normally men) in a church-recognized relationship analogous to siblinghood. (Note: In the Albanian-Greek and Vlach dialects the term used is: (in Greek) "Βλάμης" (Vlamis, sing.) or "Βλάμηδες" (Vlamides, pl.). Wiktionary.)

Such ceremonies can be found in the history of the Catholic Church until the 14th century and in the Eastern Orthodox Church until the early 20th century. Documented in Byzantine manuscripts from the ninth to the fifteenth centuries, prayers established participants as 'spiritual brothers' (pneumatikoi adelphoi) and contained references to sainted pairs, including most notably Saints Sergius and Bacchus as well as Saints Cosmas and Damian, who were famous for their friendship." In England, some scholars believe an adelphopoiesis may have also taken place between William Neville and John Clanvowe.

In the late twentieth century, the Christian tradition gained notoriety as the focus of controversy involving advocates and opponents of secular and religious legalization of same-sex relationships.

== Adelphopoiesis in Christian tradition ==
The Russian polymath scholar, priest, and martyr Pavel Florensky offered a famous description of adelphopoiesis in his monumental 1914 book The Pillar and the Ground of The Truth: An Essay in Orthodox Theodicy in Twelve Letters, which included an early bibliography on the topic. Florensky described traditional Christian friendship, expressed in adelphopoiesis, as "a community molecule [rather than an atomistic individualism], a pair of friends, which is the principle of actions here, just as the family was this kind of molecule for the pagan community," reflecting Christ's words that "wherever two or more of you are gathered in my name, there am I in the midst of thee." Florensky in his theological exegesis of the rite described an overlap of Christian agapic, philic, and erotic love in adelphopoiesis. He defines erōs as "sensuous, passionate love," storgē as "love of kith and kin," agapē as "love of valuation, respect," and philia as "love of inward acceptance, personal insight, friendliness." He then says, "But in fact, none of these words expresses the love of friendship that we are considering in the present letter, a love that combines the aspects of philia, erōs, and agapē, a love the ancients attempted to express in some degree by the compound word philophrosunē." Were we to choose but one of these words, he says that "the most suitable word here is philein with its derivatives," such as philia ("friendship") and philos ("friend"). Within the Church, Florensky says that such philic relationships "blossom in sacramental adelphopoeisis [sic] and the co-partaking of the Holy Eucharist, and are nourished by this partaking for co-ascesis, co-patience, and co-martyrdom." A similar vocation to co-martyrdom is entailed in the Orthodox rite of marriage, which contains an invocation to the martyrs, who have received their crowns, but the various extant rites of Adelphopoiesis, though in some respects resembling the marriage rite, do not appear to contain any crowning such as takes place in the Orthodox rite of matrimony. Rather the ritual act, apart from co-communing in the Eucharist, that has commonly symbolized the adelphopoietic relationship in Russia, Greece, and other Orthodox countries has been an exchange of baptismal crosses (usually worn throughout life). This exchange has commonly taken place, not in public, but in a private encounter between those entering this philic relationship. Such a private exchange is depicted between Parfen and the prince in chapter 20 of Fyodor Dostoevsky's The Idiot:

"You wish to exchange crosses? Very well, Parfen, if that's the case, I'm glad enough--that makes us brothers, you know."

The prince took off his tin cross, Parfen his gold one, and the exchange was made.

Parfen was silent. With sad surprise the prince observed that the look of distrust, the bitter, ironical smile, had still not altogether left his newly-adopted brother's face. At moments, at all events, it showed itself but too plainly.

The relationship of "Cross-Brotherhood" appearing here in Dostoevsky's The Idiot seems but a sad mockery of the mutually-edifying, faithful, intimate relationship envisioned by Pavel Florensky as blossoming "in sacramental adelphopoeisis" [sic]. Florensky cites the relationship between Prince Jonathan and the future king David the Shepherd as an example of the quality of relationship his letter is expounding, citing First Samuel 18:1, 3-4; 20:4, 8, 17 and 41 as his evidence. He writes that David's "friendship with Jonathan also rises above the level of the utilitarian friendship of the Old Testament and anticipates the tragic friendship of the New."

Alternative views are that this rite was used in many ways, such as the formation of permanent pacts between leaders of nations or between religious brothers. This was a replacement for "blood-brotherhood" which was forbidden by the church at the time. Others such as Brent Shaw have maintained also that these unions were more akin to "blood-brotherhood" and had no sexual connotation.

Yet, explicitly contradicting the eros-excluding interpretations of the ritual is the Eastern Orthodox Church's own Book of Canon Law, the Pedalion, which, as reported by historian Franco Mormando, "acknowledges the frequently erotic nature of the relationship ritualized in the 'brotherhood by adoption' or 'wedbrotherhood' ceremony: in prohibiting the ceremony (in its chapter on marriage), the Pedalion states that wedbrotherhood 'merely affords matter for some persons to fulfill their carnal desires and to enjoy sensual pleasures, as countless examples of actual experience have shown at various times and in various places...'"

Rites for "adelphopoiesis" are contained in Byzantine manuscripts dating from the ninth to the 15th century.

== "Same-sex union" or "brother-making" ==
The ritual gained popular attention in the West, however, after Yale historian John Boswell in his book Same-sex unions in pre-modern Europe, also published as The marriage of likeness, argued that the practice was to unite two persons in a marriage-like union. His theory was disputed by other academic experts on the issue, notably historian Claudia Rapp in a special issue of the Catholic scholarly journal Traditio (vol. 52) in 1997, as well as Byzantine liturgical historian Stefano Parenti, who identified the origins of problems in Boswell's manuscript analysis. Boswell's work also was disputed by the religious community today descended most directly from that involved in the original practice, the Greek Orthodox Church, which regarded his work as a modern American cultural appropriation of its tradition, and translates adelphopoiesis as "fraternization," involving a chaste friendship. A similar translation of the term is "brother-making".

While many scholars criticized Boswell's findings, some agreed with him, including liberal American Episcopalian scholars Robin Scroggs and William L. Countryman. Boswell gave text and translation for a number of versions of the "fraternization" ceremony in Greek, and translation for a number of Slavonic versions (Bratotvorenie or Pobratimstvo), although Rapp and others disputed the accuracy of his translations. Boswell himself denied that adelphopoiesis should be properly translated as "homosexual marriage," but he argued that "brother-making" or "making of brothers" was an "anachronistically literal" translation and proposed "same-sex union" as the preferable rendering. Boswell's preference was problematic to Eastern Orthodox canonists, as well as scholars such as Rapp, who argued that it involved an anachronistically modern secular epistemology and anthropology, different from traditional Christianity. Boswell suggested a potential parallel to modern constructions of sexual identity, although the rites for adelphopoiesis explicitly highlighted the spiritual nature of the union in premodern Christian terms.

Some more recent scholarship has investigated Boswell's claim along ethnographic lines. Nik Jovčić-Sas in his piece "The Tradition of Homophobia: Responses to Same-Sex relationships in Serbian Orthodoxy from the nineteenth century to the present day" highlights the distinctly sexual and romantic qualities of Pobratimstvo recorded in Serbia from the 19th and early 20th centuries. Looking at the work of anthropologists and ethnographers such as Mary Edith Durham, Paul Näcke, Dinko Tomašić and Tih R. Gregorovitch Jovčić-Sas argues that brotherhood unions were not simply platonic or political unions, as taught by the Serbian Orthodox Church. He also draws attention to the effects of Western European cultural shaming upon Serbian society—a shame resulting in suppression and cultural amnesia regarding the actual praxis and embodiment of Pobratimstvo in earlier same-sex relationships.

== Boswell's critics ==
Halsall (1996) has produced a detailed list of debates (including reviews by supporters and skeptics) surrounding Boswell's works.

In his review of Boswell's book, Miodrag Kojadinović says: "The book is a scientific treatise abundant with references. But it starts from a premise that to me seems insufficiently proven. It chooses to see, based on relatively meagre evidence, a very idiosyncratic relationship sanctioned among certain ethnic groups as a precursor to California bunnies' white weddings. It goes so far to refer to the emperor Basil as a 'hunk'. It neglects the fact that adelphopoiesis/pobratimstvo can be achieved through simple invocation: 'My-Brother-Through-God!' in case of peril. A foe suddenly turns an ally."

A study by Claudia Rapp also argues against some of Boswell's main conclusions and suggests the origins of the rite lie in rituals for blessing paired or small-group monastic living. In contrast to Boswell, Rapp showcases the ritual dissimilarity between marriage and adelphopoiesis. In his review of Rapp's book, Gabriel Radle offers some important critiques, showcasing that while Boswell may have overinterpreted the relationship between these two rites, some ritual and symbolic overlap did exist, while also arguing that since Josephite marriage and adelphopoiesis emerged at the same time, scholars would do well to explore how these two types of relational bonds differ from one another.

== See also ==
- Bromance
- Confraternities
- David and Jonathan
- Female bonding
- Law of adoption (Mormonism)
- Male bonding
- Philia
- Platonic love
- Romantic friendship
- Soulmate
- Sodalities
- Womance
