= John Boswell =

American historian (1947–1994)

- Born: John Eastburn Boswell; March 20, 1947; Boston, Massachusetts, U.S.
- Died: December 24, 1994 (aged 47); New Haven, Connecticut, U.S.
- Other name: Jeb Boswell
- Partner: Jerone Hart (1970–1994)

Academic background
- Education: College of William & Mary (BA); Harvard University (PhD)
- Thesis: Muslim Communities Under the Crown of Aragon in the Fourteenth Century (1975)
- Academic advisors: Giles Constable; Jocelyn Hillgarth

Academic work
- Discipline: History; philology
- Institutions: Yale University
- Doctoral students: Robin Stacey, Ruth Mazo Karras
- Main interests: Christianity and homosexuality
- Notable works: Christianity, Social Tolerance, and Homosexuality (1980); Same-Sex Unions in Pre-Modern Europe (1994)
- Influenced: Ralph Hexter

John Eastburn Boswell (March 20, 1947 – December 24, 1994) was an American historian and a full professor at Yale University. Many of Boswell's studies focused on the issue of religion and homosexuality, specifically Christianity and homosexuality. Much of his work addressed the history of marginalized groups, particularly in the context of religion and sexuality.

His first book, The Royal Treasure: Muslim Communities Under the Crown of Aragon in the Fourteenth Century, appeared in 1977. In 1994, Boswell's fourth book, Same-Sex Unions in Pre-Modern Europe, was published. He died that same year from AIDS-related complications.

== Biography ==
=== Early life ===
Boswell was born on March 20, 1947, in Boston, Massachusetts, the son of Colonel Henry Boswell Jr. and Catharine Eastburn Boswell. He earned his B.A. at the College of William & Mary, and his Ph.D. at Harvard University before being hired to teach at Yale University.

=== Career ===
A medieval philologist, Boswell spoke or read several Scandinavian languages, Old Icelandic, German, French, Spanish, Italian, Latin, Greek, early and modern Russian, Old Church Slavonic, Armenian, Persian, Arabic, Hebrew, Syriac, and Akkadian. Boswell received his doctorate in 1975 and joined the Yale University history faculty, where his colleagues included David Brion Davis, Jaroslav Pelikan, Peter Gay, Hanna Holborn Gray, and Michael Howard. Boswell was made professor in 1982, and was named the A. Whitney Griswold Professor of History in 1990.

==== Books ====
The Royal Treasure (1977) is a detailed historical study of the Mudéjar Muslims in Aragon in the 14th century.

External videos
- "Jews, Gay People, and Bicycle Riders" – a public lecture by Boswell at the University of Wisconsin-Madison on 25 April 1986, videotaped for "Nothing to Hide," a weekly LGBTQ program on WYOU Community TV

Christianity, Social Tolerance, and Homosexuality (1980) is a work which, according to George Chauncey et al. (1989), "offered a revolutionary interpretation of the Western tradition, arguing that the Roman Catholic Church had not condemned gay people throughout its history, but rather, at least until the twelfth century, had alternately evinced no special concern about homosexuality or actually celebrated love between men." The book won a National Book Award (Note: This was the 1981 award for hardcover History From 1980 to 1983 in National Book Award history there were dual hardcover and paperback awards in most categories, and several nonfiction subcategories including General Nonfiction. Most of the paperback award-winners were reprints, including the 1981 History.) and the Stonewall Book Award in 1981, but Boswell's thesis was criticized by Warren Johansson, Wayne R. Dynes, and John Lauritsen, who believed that he had attempted to whitewash the historic crimes of the Christian Church against gay men.

The Kindness of Strangers: Child Abandonment in Western Europe from Late Antiquity to the Renaissance (1988) is a scholarly study of the widespread practice of abandoning unwanted children and the means by which society tries to care for them. The title, as Boswell states in the Introduction, is inspired by a puzzling phrase Boswell had found in a number of documents: aliena misericordia, which might at first seem to mean "a strange kindness", is better translated "the kindness of strangers," echoing the line "I have always depended on the kindness of strangers" from A Streetcar Named Desire by Tennessee Williams.

The Marriage of Likeness: Same-Sex Unions in Pre-Modern Europe (New York: Villard, 1994) argues that the adelphopoiia liturgy was evidence that the attitude of the Christian church towards homosexuality has changed over time, and that early Christians did on occasion accept same-sex relationships.

Rites of so-called "same-sex union" (Boswell's proposed translation) occur in ancient prayer-books of both the western and eastern churches. They are rites of adelphopoiesis, literally Greek for the making of brothers. Boswell stated that these should be regarded as sexual unions similar to marriages. Boswell made many detailed translations of these rites in Same-Sex Unions, and stated that one mass gay wedding occurred only a couple of centuries ago in the Archbasilica of Saint John Lateran, the cathedral seat of the Pope as Bishop of Rome. This aspect of Boswell's text has drawn significant scholarly debate, with critics contending that these rites represented adoption or fraternity rather than sexual unions. Boswell pointed out such evidence as an icon of two saints, Sergius and Bacchus (at St. Catherine's on Mount Sinai), and drawings, such as one he interprets as depicting the wedding feast of Emperor Basil I to his "partner", John. Boswell sees Jesus as fulfilling the role of the "pronubus" or in modern parallel, best man.

Boswell's methodology and conclusions have been disputed by many historians. James Brundage, professor of history and law at the University of Kansas, observed that "the mainstream reaction was that he raised some interesting questions, but hadn't proved his case."

The Irish historian and journalist Jim Duffy, in his "Rite and Reason" column in The Irish Times, praised Boswell's work. Welsh LGBT historian Norena Shopland, in Forbidden Lives, examines a number of translations of Gerald of Wales's extract from the third book of Topographia Hiberniae, "A proof of the iniquity (of the Irish) and a novel form of marriage". Shopland shows how all translations currently being used were originally made before homosexuality was legal, and so reflect those times. She includes evidence supporting Boswell's translation of "marriage" and not, as others claim "a treaty".

=== Faith and sexuality ===
Boswell was a Roman Catholic, having converted from the Episcopal Church of his upbringing at the age of 15. He was a practicing Roman Catholic throughout his life, maintaining his faith while expressing disagreement with the Church's teachings on homosexuality. Although he was orthodox in most of his beliefs, he strongly disagreed with his church's stated opposition to homosexual behavior and relationships. He was in a relationship with Jerone Hart for some twenty years until his death. Hart and Boswell are buried together at Grove Street Cemetery, New Haven, Connecticut.

In "Revolutions, Universals, and Sexual Categories", Boswell compares the constructionist–essentialist positions to the realist–nominalist dichotomy. He also lists three types of sexual taxonomies:

- All or most humans are polymorphously sexual... external accidents, such as socio-cultural pressure, legal sanctions, religious beliefs, historical or personal circumstances determine the actual expression of each person's sexual feelings.
- Two or more sexual categories, usually, but not always based on sexual object choice.
- One type of sexual response [is] normal... all other variants abnormal.

=== Death ===
Boswell died of complications from AIDS in the Yale infirmary in New Haven, Connecticut, on December 24, 1994, aged 47.

== Legacy ==
- During the late 1980s, the influence of Michel Foucault's writings led to the emergence of a social constructivist view of human sexuality which emphasised the historical and cultural specificity of sexual identities such as 'heterosexual' and 'homosexual'. Despite Boswell's friendly relations with Foucault, he remained adamantly opposed to the French theorist's views, which he characterised as a reemergence of medieval nominalism, and defended his own striking essentialism in the face of changing academic fashions.
- Since his death, Boswell's work has been critiqued by some medievalists and queer theorists, who argue that applying modern concepts of sexuality to pre-modern societies risks anachronism.
- Several other scholars, including Terry Castle, Ruth Vanita, and Rictor Norton, have followed in Boswell's footsteps, building up the field of lesbian and gay studies (as distinct from queer theory), and proposing that categorizations of humans by sexual predilection much predate the 19th century (where Foucault and his followers place it), both in the West (as in Plato's Symposium) and in other cultures (e.g., India).
- In 2006, Boswell was named with online resources as an LGBT History Month Icon.
- The College of William & Mary announced in late April 2021 that an academic building would be renamed in Boswell's honor. Boswell Hall includes the departments of Gender, Sexuality, & Women's Studies and Sociology. Additionally, William & Mary's LGBTQ+ interdisciplinary scholarship program is named in his honor.

== Works ==
- The Royal Treasure: Muslim Communities Under the Crown of Aragon in the Fourteenth Century (1977)–Online
- Christianity, Social Tolerance, and Homosexuality: Gay People in Western Europe from the Beginning of the Christian Era to the Fourteenth Century (1980) — winner of the National Book Award, ISBN 978-0226067117
- Rediscovering Gay History: Archetypes of Gay Love in Christian History (1982)
- The Kindness of Strangers: The Abandonment of Children in Western Europe from Late Antiquity to the Renaissance (1989)
- Homosexuality in the Priesthood and the Religious Life (1991) (co-author)
- Same-Sex Unions in Pre-Modern Europe (1994), Villard Books, ISBN 0-679-43228-0

== See also ==
- Adelphopoiesis
- The Bible and homosexuality
- Alan Bray
- Queer studies
- Queer theology

== Notes ==
Awards
Preceded by Henry Kissinger	National Book Award for Hardcover History; 1980	Succeeded by Peter J. Powell
Preceded by Winston Leyland	Stonewall Book Award; 1981	Succeeded by Lillian Faderman
Preceded by Winston Leyland	Stonewall Book Award; 1981	Succeeded by J. R. Roberts
Preceded by Winston Leyland	Stonewall Book Award; 1981	Succeeded by Vito Russo
