= Sporus =

Freedman of the Roman emperor Nero

- Died: 69 AD
- Cause of death: Suicide
- Occupation: Slave
- Known for: Being castrated, marriage to the Emperor Nero
- Spouse(s): Nero (married 66 or 67 AD, died 68AD)

Sporus (died 69 AD) was a young slave boy whom the Roman emperor Nero castrated and married during his tour of Greece in 66–67 AD, allegedly in order for him to play the role of his wife, Poppaea Sabina, who had died under uncertain circumstances the previous year, possibly during childbirth or after being assaulted by Nero.

Ancient historians generally portrayed the relationship between Nero and Sporus as an "abomination"; Suetonius places his account of the Nero–Sporus relationship in his "scandalous accounts of Nero's sexual aberrations", between his raping a Vestal Virgin and committing incest with his mother. Some think Nero used his marriage to Sporus to assuage the guilt he felt for allegedly kicking his pregnant wife Poppaea to death. Dio Cassius, in a more detailed account, writes that Sporus bore an uncanny resemblance to Poppaea and that Nero called Sporus by her name.

== Name ==
Scholars have deduced that Sporus was likely an epithet given to him when his abuse started, considering it to be derived from the Greek word σπόρος (spóros), meaning "seed" or "semen", which may refer to his inability to have children following his castration. Against this popular view, David Woods points out that the name resembles the Latin word spurius of Sabine origin, meaning "illegitimate child"; hence Woods advances the thesis that Nero himself had called the boy Spurius, or that he believed the Greek name Sporus to be related to the Latin word.

== Life ==
Little is known about Sporus' background except that he was a youth to whom Nero took a liking. He may have been a puer delicatus. These boys were sometimes castrated to preserve their youthful qualities. The puer delicatus generally was a child-slave chosen by his master for his beauty and sexual attractiveness. Dio Cassius identifies Sporus as the child of a freedman.

=== Marriage to Nero ===
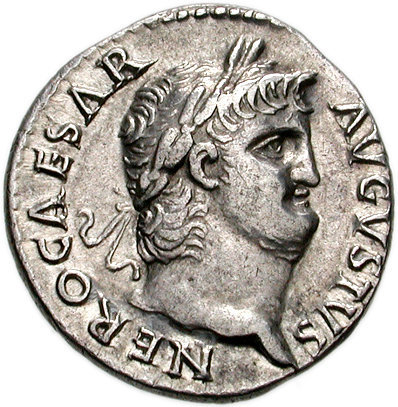
Nero on a coin of AD 65/66

Nero's wife, Poppaea Sabina, died in 65 AD. This was supposedly in childbirth, although it was later rumored Nero kicked her to death. At the beginning of 66 AD, Nero married Statilia Messalina. Later that year or in 67 AD, he married Sporus, who was said to bear a remarkable resemblance to Poppaea.

Nero had Sporus castrated, (Note: SUET., Nero 28,1: "Puerum Sporum exsectis testibus etiam in muliebrem naturam transfigurare conatus cum dote et flammeo per sollemnia nuptiarum celeberrimo officio deductum ad se pro uxore habuit" "He castrated the boy Sporus and actually tried to make a woman of him; and he married him with all the usual ceremonies, including a dowry and a bridal veil, took him to his house attended by a great throng, and treated him as his wife" – The expression exsectis testibus, literally "having the testicles removed", does not imply that the entire genitalia was removed.) and during their marriage, Nero had Sporus appear in public as his wife wearing the regalia that was customary for Roman empresses. He then took Sporus to Greece and back to Rome, making Calvia Crispinilla serve as "mistress of the wardrobe" to Sporus. (Note: ἐπιτροπεία τὴν περὶ ἐσθῆτα (epitropeía tḕn perì esthêta).) Ancient writers claim, although scholars doubt their veracity, that Nero had earlier married another freedman, Pythagoras, who had played the role of Nero's husband; now Sporus played the role of Nero's wife. Among other forms of address, Sporus was termed "Lady", "Empress", and "Mistress". Suetonius quotes one Roman who lived around this time who remarked that the world would have been better off if Nero's father Gnaeus Domitius Ahenobarbus had married someone more like the castrated boy.

Shortly before Nero's death, during the Calends festival, Sporus presented Nero with a ring bearing a gemstone depicting the Rape of Proserpina, in which the ruler of the underworld forces a young girl to become his bride. It was at the time considered one of the many bad omens of Nero's fall.

Sporus was one of the four companions on the emperor's last journey in June of 68 AD, along with Epaphroditus, Neophytus, and Phaon. It was Sporus, and not his wife Messalina, to whom Nero turned as he began the ritual lamentations before taking his own life.

=== After Nero's death ===
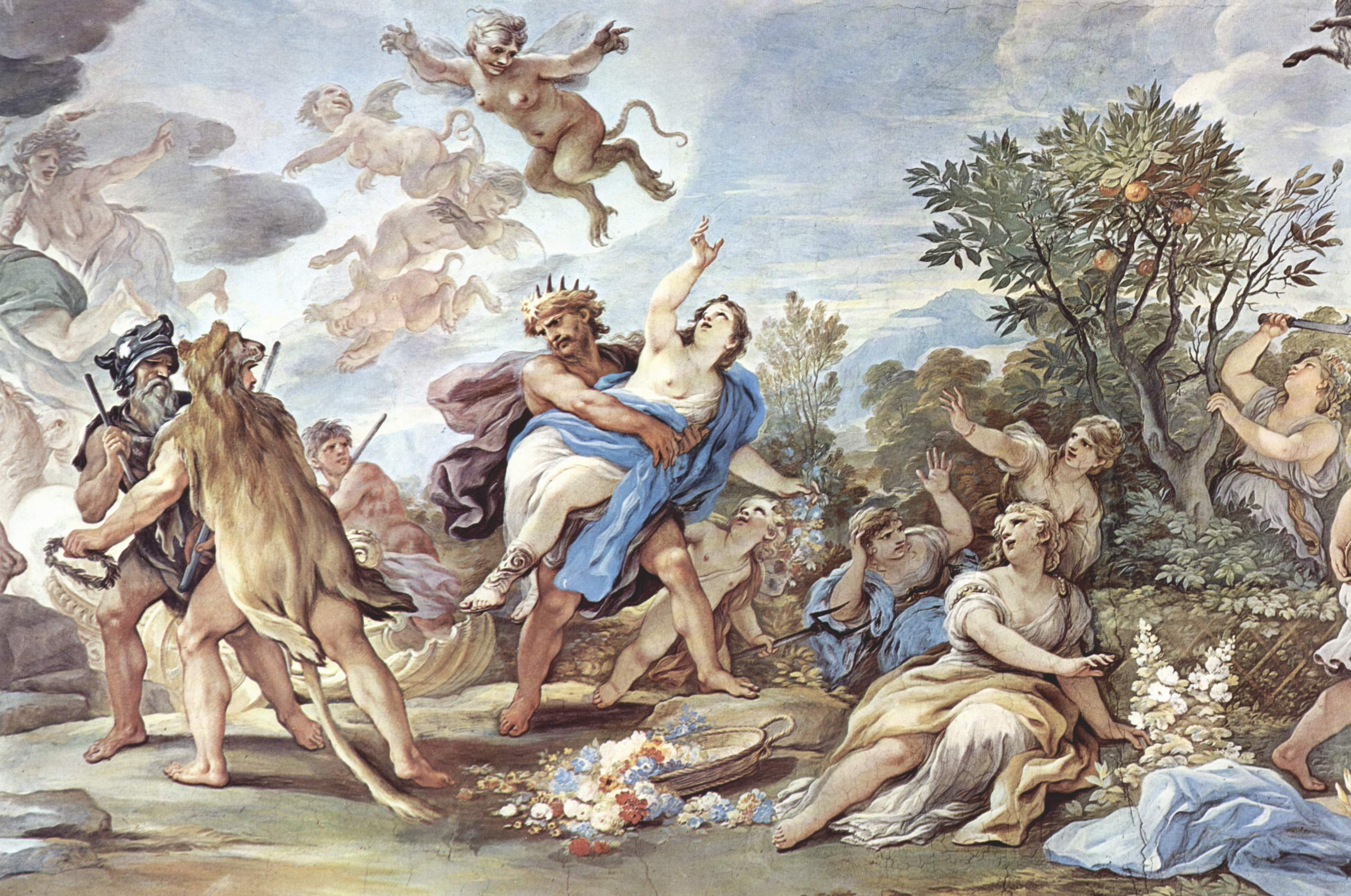
The Rape of Proserpina, by Luca Giordano

Soon afterward, Sporus was taken to the care of the Praetorian prefect Nymphidius Sabinus, who had persuaded the Praetorian Guard to desert Nero. Nymphidius treated Sporus as a wife and called him "Poppaea". Nymphidius tried to make himself emperor but was killed by his own guardsmen.

In 69 AD, Sporus became involved with Otho, the second of a rapid, violent succession of four emperors who vied for power during the chaos that followed Nero's death. Otho had once been married to Poppaea, until Nero had forced their divorce. Otho reigned for three months until his suicide after the Battle of Bedriacum. His victorious rival, Vitellius, intended to use Sporus as a victim in a public entertainment: a fatal "re-enactment" of the Rape of Proserpina at a gladiator show. Sporus avoided this public humiliation by committing suicide.

== In media ==
Dramatisation of the life of Nero at the Royal Dramatic Theatre, 1904. Reclining far right is John Wettervik as Sporus.

In 1735, Alexander Pope wrote a satirical poem, Epistle to Dr Arbuthnot, that mocked the courtier Lord Hervey, who had been accused of homosexuality a few years earlier. He scoffs at using so strong a weapon as satire upon a weak and effeminate target like Sporus, "that mere white curd of ass's milk", and in a famous line Pope poses the rhetorical question: "Who breaks a butterfly upon a wheel?"

== See also ==
- History of same-sex unions
- Homosexuality in ancient Rome
- Pythagoras (freedman)
- Who breaks a butterfly upon a wheel?
- Elagabalus

== Bibliography ==
- Dion Cassius. Ixii. 28, Ixiii. 12, 13, 27, Ixiv. 8, Ixv. 10;
- Suetonius. Nero. 28, 46, 48, 49;
- Sextus Aurelius Victor. De Caesaribus. 5, Epit. 5;
- Dion Chrysostom. Oratio. xxi;
- Suidas, s. v. "Sporus”
- Smith, William (1849). Dictionary of Greek and Roman Biography and Mythology. Vol. 3. C. C. Little and J. Brown; [etc., etc. ]. pp. 1411, 2012. LCCN 07038839.
- Champlin, Edward (2005). Nero. Harvard University Press. p. 346. ISBN 978-0-674-01822-8.
- Woods, David (2009). "Nero and Sporus". Latomus Revue d'etudes latines. Vol. 68 (1st ed.). Editions Latomus. pp. 73–82. ISSN 0023-8856.
