= Calvia Crispinilla =

1st century Roman courtier and a favourite of the emperor Nero

- Died: After 70; Unknown
- Occupation: Courtier
- Title: "Mistress of the Imperial wardrobe"
- Spouse: Sextus Traulus Montanus

Calvia Crispinilla (fl. c. 70) was a Roman Imperial courtier.

== Life ==
Calvia Crispinilla was possibly of African origins. She was a prominent courtier at the court of Emperor Nero. A noblewoman of unknown lineage, she was considered to have great power and influence, having accompanied Nero and his third wife Statilia Messalina to Greece in 66. She was seen as greedy and rapacious by her contemporaries. Tacitus called Calvia Crispinilla a "tutor in vice" (magistrate libidinum) of Nero. When Nero married the castrated slave Sporus in 67, Calvia was made the "mistress of wardrobe" (a position akin to that of a handmaiden or lady-in-waiting) of Sporus (epitropeia ten peri estheta).

By 68–69, after changing her political associations, Crispinilla was said to have been the instigator of the unsuccessful revolt of Lucius Clodius Macer in Africa. She was subsequently credited with being behind the defection of Galba from Nero.

After Nero's death, Calvia Crispinilla married a former consul. Her first husband might have been the Sextus Traulus Montanus whom Claudius executed in AD 48, as a number of ceramic wares have been found combining the names of Traulus and Crispinilla. During Otho's brief period as emperor there was a public outcry for her execution, but Otho seems to have protected her, and she survived unscathed.

... and the successive regimes of Galba, Otho and Vitellius brought her no harm. In after days she enjoyed great influence as a wealthy woman who had no heirs - for, whether times are good or bad, such qualities retain their power.

— Tacitus

Calvia Crispinilla was also active within commerce, and enjoyed success with her investments in the lucrative wine trade.

== Historical evidence ==
Several olive oil amphorae have been recovered from Poetovio in the Adriatic region, bearing stamps with her name or Calvia and Traulus Montanus together. Two of her slaves, Camulus and Quietus, are attested by a surviving inscription near Tarentum.

== Bibliography ==
- Tacitus, Annals, xvi. Appendix viii
- Dio Cassius, Roman History 62.12.3–4
- Champlin, Edward (2005). Nero. Harvard University Press. p. 346. ISBN 978-0-674-01822-8.
- Charles Picard, Gilbert (1965). Augustus and Nero: The Secret of the Empire. New York: Thomas Y. Crowell. p. 162. WB010589.
