= Neophytus (freedman) =

Freedman of the Roman emperor Nero

Neophytus was a freedman of the Roman emperor Nero. He was one of the four companions on the emperor's late journey in June 68, with Epaphroditus, Phaon and Sporus, and was with Nero at his suicide.

== Bibliography ==
- De Caesaribus, Sextus Aurelius Victor.
