= History of same-sex unions =

This is a history of same-sex unions in cultures around the world. Various types of same-sex unions have existed, ranging from informal, unsanctioned, and temporary relationships to highly ritualized unions that have included marriage. State-recognized same-sex unions have recently become more widely accepted, with various countries recognizing same-sex marriages or other types of unions. A celebrated achievement in LGBT history occurred when Queen Beatrix signed a law making Netherlands the first country to legalize same-sex marriage in 2001.

== Old World ==
=== Classical Europe, Middle East, and China ===
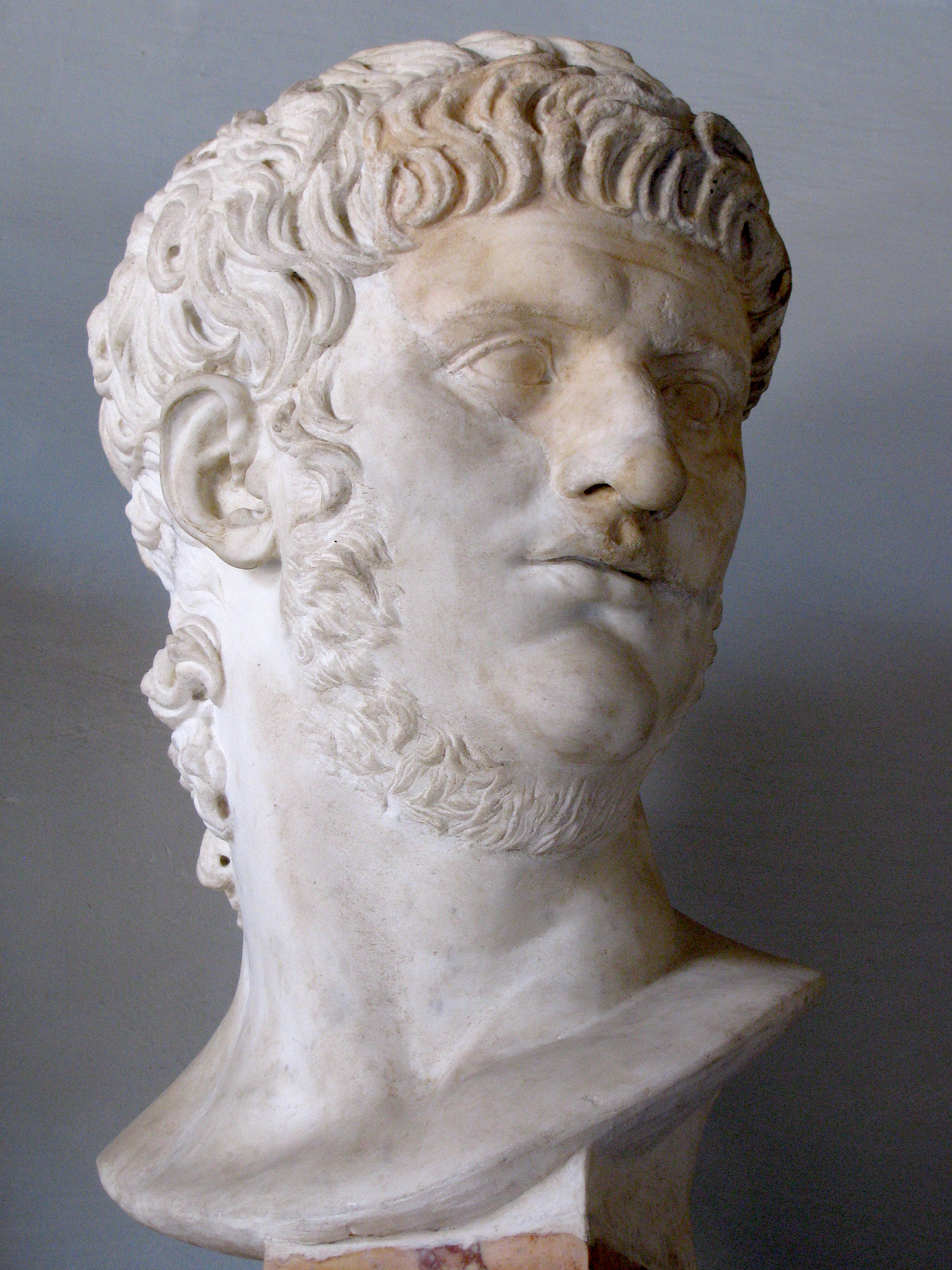
Roman ruler Nero is reported to have married at least two males in different occasions.

There is history of recorded same-sex unions around the world. Various types of same-sex unions have existed, ranging from informal, unsanctioned relationships to highly ritualized unions. Same-sex unions were known in Ancient Greece and Rome, ancient Mesopotamia, in some regions of China and at certain times in ancient European history.

In Classical Greece, the pederastic relationships between Greek men (erastes) and Greek youths (eromenos) were similar to marriage in that the age of the youth was similar to the age at which women married (the mid-teens, though in some city states, as young as age seven), and the relationship could only be undertaken with the consent of the father. This consent, just as in the case of a daughter's marriage, was contingent on the suitor's social standing. The relationship consisted of very specific social and religious responsibilities and also had a sexual component. Unlike marriage, however, a pederastic relation was temporary and ended when the boy turned seventeen. These unions created a moral dilemma for the Greeks and were not universally accepted.

At the same time, many of these relationships might be more clearly understood as mentoring relationships between adult men and young boys rather than an analog of marriage. This is particularly true in the case of Sparta, where the relationship was intended to further a young boy's military training. While the relationship was generally lifelong and of profound emotional significance to the participants, it was not considered marriage by contemporary culture, and the relationship continued even after participants reached age 20 and married women, as was expected in the culture.

Numerous examples of same sex unions among peers, not age-structured, are found in Ancient Greek writings. Famous Greek couples in same sex relationships include Harmodius and Aristogiton, Alexander and Hephaestion, Agathon and Pausanias, and the Sacred Band of Thebes, so called because the male couples that formed it exchanged sacred vows between lover and beloved at the shrine of Iolaus, beloved of Heracles.. However, in none of these same sex unions is the Greek word for "marriage" ever mentioned. The Romans appear to have been the first to perform same sex marriages.

At least two Roman Emperors were in same-sex unions. There are records of same-sex marriage dating back to the first century AD. The first Roman emperor to have married a man was Nero, who is reported to have married two other men on different occasions. First, with one of his freedmen, Pythagoras, to whom Nero took the role of the bride. Later, Nero married a young boy named Sporus to replace his wife Poppea Sabina who had died and whom Sporus was said to resemble. They married in a very public ceremony with all the solemnities of matrimony, and lived with him as his spouse. A friend gave the "bride" away "as required by law." The marriage was celebrated separately in both Greece and Rome in extravagant public ceremonies. The Child Emperor Elagabalus referred to his chariot driver, a blond slave from Caria named Hierocles, as his husband. He also married an athlete named Zoticus in a lavish public ceremony in Rome amidst the rejoicings of the citizens.

Conubium existed only between a civis Romanus and a civis Romana (that is, between a male Roman citizen and a female Roman citizen), so that a marriage between two Roman males (or with a slave, amasius) would have no legal standing in Roman law (apart, presumably, from the arbitrary will of the emperor in the two aforementioned cases).

In pre-Christian Rome and Greece, there had been some debate on which form of sexuality was preferable. For example, a debate between homosexual and heterosexual love was included in Plutarch's Moralia. While homosexuality was tolerated in pre-Christian Rome, it was still nonetheless controversial. Many people seemed to not oppose bisexuality, but there were also those who preferred to be exclusively heterosexual or homosexual.

An example of egalitarian male domestic partnership from the early Zhou dynasty period of China is recorded in the story of Pan Zhang & Wang Zhongxian. While the relationship was clearly approved by the wider community, and was compared to heterosexual marriage, it did not involve a religious ceremony binding the couple. In the southern Chinese province of Guangdong Cantonese females would bind themselves in contracts to younger females in elaborate ceremonies. Males also entered similar arrangements. This type of arrangement was also similar in ancient European history.

According to Robin Lane Fox, among the unusual customs of the isolated oasis of Siwa (now Egypt, once Libya), one of great antiquity which survived to the 20th century was male homosexuality and same-sex marriage.

=== Policy of the early Christian Church and Middle Ages ===
Same-sex marriage was outlawed in Ancient Rome on 16 December 342 AD by the Christian emperors Constantius II and Constans. This law specifically outlaws marriages between men and reads as follows:

When a man “marries” in the manner of a woman, a “woman” about to renounce men, what does he wish, when sex has lost its significance; when the crime is one which it is not profitable to know; when Venus is changed into another form; when love is sought and not found? We order the statutes to arise, the laws to be armed with an avenging sword, that those infamous persons who are now, or who hereafter may be, guilty may be subjected to exquisite punishment. (Theodosian Code 9.7.3)

In the vein of other Ancient Roman philosophical traditions, the increasingly influential belief of Christianity promoted marriage for procreative purposes. The texts of the Talmud and Torah, and the Bible, They were wrongly used to justify persecution against queer people and homosexuality, such texts were seen as specifically prohibiting the practices, whose personal interpretation It placed the existence of these people and sex at risk, putting it in an exclusionary way as contrary to nature and the will of the Creator, and a moral shortcoming, something questionable, even in the texts. Texts were, at some point, taken out of context to justify homophobia and exclusion. Even after the passing of the Theodosian code the Christian emperors continued to collect taxes on male prostitutes until the reign of Anastasius (491–518). In the year 390, the Christian emperors Valentinian II, Theodoisus and Arcadius declared homosexual sex to be illegal and those who were guilty of it were condemned to be burned alive in front of the public. The Christian Emperor Justinian (527–565) made homosexuals a scapegoat for problems such as "famines, earthquakes, and pestilences."

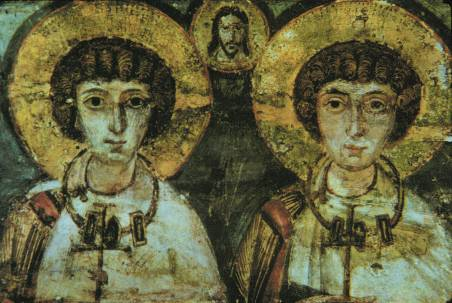
Historian John Boswell claimed the 4th century Christian martyrs Saint Sergius and Saint Bacchus were united in the ritual of adelphopoiesis, which he calls an early form of religious same-sex marriage.

After the Middle Ages in Europe, same-sex relationships were increasingly frowned upon and banned in many countries by the Church or the state. Nevertheless, Historian John Boswell argued that adelphopoiesis, or brother-making, represented an early form of religious same-sex marriage in the Orthodox church. Alan Bray saw the rite of Ordo ad fratres faciendum ("Order for the making of brothers") as serving the same purpose in the medieval Roman Catholic Church.

A same-sex marriage between the two men Pedro Díaz and Muño Vandilaz in the Galician municipality of Rairiz de Veiga in Spain occurred on 16 April 1061. They were married by a priest at a small chapel. The historic documents about the church wedding were found at Monastery of San Salvador de Celanova. Critics have argued that the union was simply a case of adelphopoiesis.

In late medieval France, it is possible the practice of entering a legal contract of "embrotherment" (affrèrement) provided a vehicle for civil unions between unrelated male adults who pledged to live together sharing ‘un pain, un vin, et une bourse’ – one bread, one wine, and one purse. This legal category may represent one of the earliest forms of sanctioned same-sex unions.

The medieval Christian church, taking the lead of Augustine, developed the sacramental understanding of matrimony. However, even at this stage the Catholic Church did not consider the sacraments equal in importance. Marriage has never been considered either to be one of the sacraments of Christian initiation (Baptism, Confirmation, Eucharist) or of those that confer a character (Baptism, Confirmation, Holy Orders).

=== Early-modern Period ===
Michel de Montaigne, a 16th-century French philosopher and prominent essayist, reports having heard a third-party description of a same-sex wedding occurring some years earlier using the usual Tridentine marriage ceremonies of the Roman Catholic Church. The ceremony was said to have occurred a few years before 1581, at the San Giovanni a Porta Latina basilica in Rome and the participants were burned at the stake by the Vatican. Some scholars say this was simply an adelphopoiesis. The Boxer Codex, dated 1590 or earlier, records the normality and acceptance of same-sex marriage in the native cultures of the Philippines prior to Spanish colonization.

In 1680, Arabella Hunt married Amy Poulter who disguised herself as a man at St Marylebone Parish Church. In 1781, Jens Andersson of Norway, assigned female at birth but identifying as male, was imprisoned and put on trial after marrying Anne Kristine Mortensdotter in a Lutheran church. When asked about his gender, the response was "Hand troer at kunde henhøre til begge Deele" ("He believes he belongs to both").

Anne Lister, dubbed "the first modern lesbian", married Ann Walker at Holy Trinity Church, Goodramgate, York in 1834.

== Modern times ==
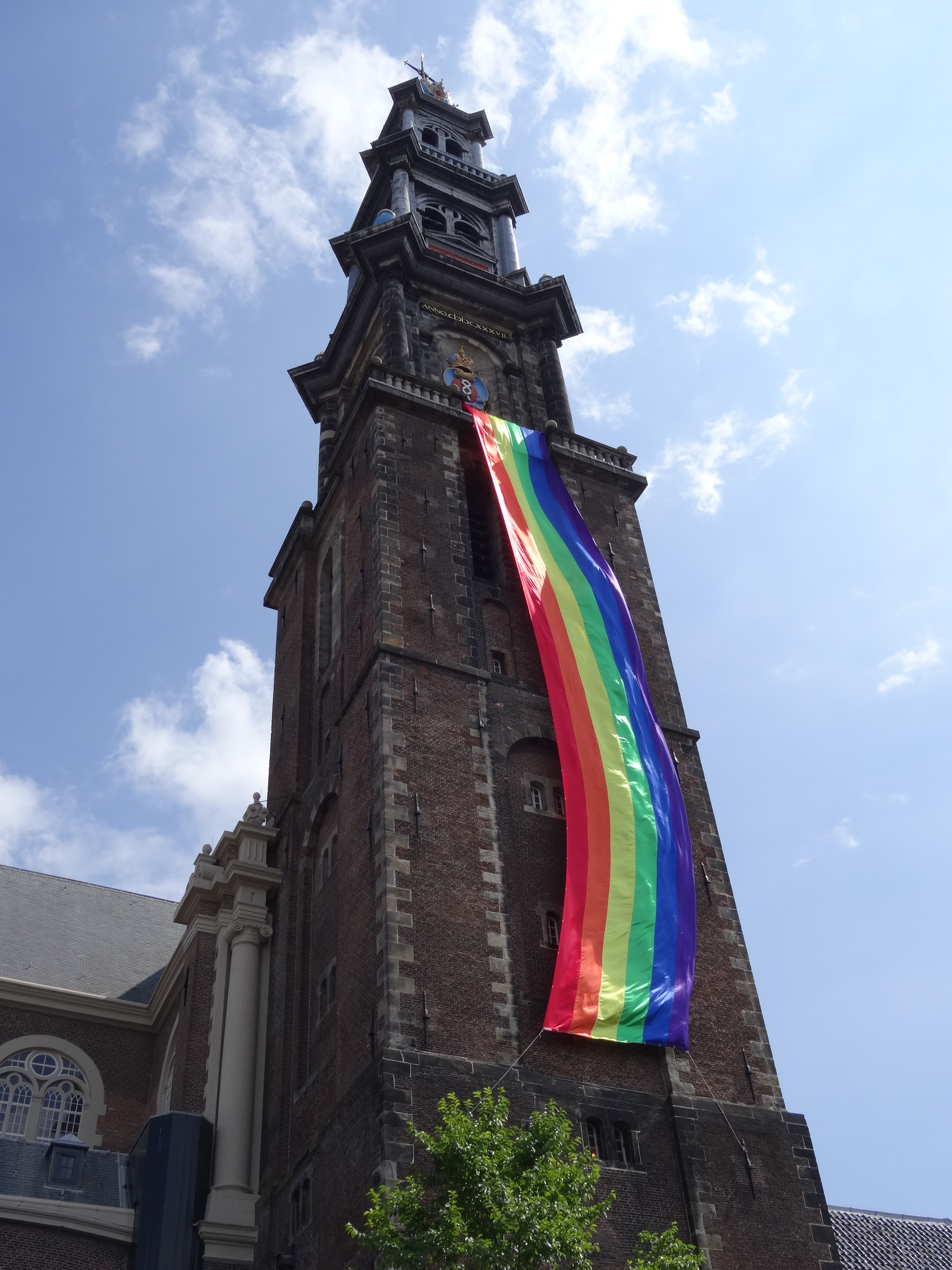
LGBT flag on the Westerkerk of Amsterdam, where Gert Kasteel and Dolf Pasker celebrated their 20th anniversary.

In the 20th and 21st centuries various types of same-sex unions have come to be legalized. As of January 2025, same-sex marriage is currently legal in twenty European countries: Andorra, Austria, Belgium, Denmark, Finland, Estonia, France, Germany, Iceland, Ireland, Liechtenstein, Luxembourg, Malta, Greece, the Netherlands, Norway, Portugal, Slovenia, Spain, Sweden, Switzerland and the United Kingdom.

Other types of recognition for same-sex unions (civil unions or registered partnerships) are, as of January 2025, legal in additional ten European countries: Croatia, Cyprus, the Czech Republic, Hungary, Italy, Monaco, Montenegro and San Marino .

A referendum to change the Constitution of the Republic of Ireland to allow same sex marriage took place on 22 May 2015 and approved the proposal to add the following declaration to the Constitution: "marriage may be contracted in accordance with law by two persons without distinction as to their sex".

== The Americas ==
=== Ancient times ===
In North America, among the Native Americans societies, homosexuality existed and some have asserted that same-sex unions have taken place with persons known as Two-Spirit types, but no documentation or evidence of same-sex marriage exists. "In many tribes, individuals who entered into same-sex relationships were considered holy and treated with utmost respect and acceptance," according to anthropologist Brian Gilley.

=== Modern times ===
On July 20, 2005, Canada became the fourth country in the world and the first country in the Americas to legalize same-sex marriage nationwide with the enactment of the Civil Marriage Act which provided a gender-neutral marriage definition. Court decisions, starting in 2003, each already legalized same-sex marriage in eight out of ten provinces and one of three territories, whose residents comprised about 90% of Canada's population. Before passage of the Act, more than 3,000 same-sex couples had already married in those areas. Most legal benefits commonly associated with marriage had been extended to cohabiting same-sex couples since 1999.

In the United States during the 19th century, there was recognition of the relationship of two women making a long-term commitment to each other and cohabitating, referred to at the time as a Boston marriage; however, the general public at the time likely did not assume that sexual activities were part of the relationship.

Jack Baker and Michael McConnell were married to each other in 1971 and received a marriage license from Blue Earth County, Minnesota. Rev. Roger Lynn, a minister from the Hennepin Avenue United Methodist Church, validated their marriage. They have lived together openly as a married couple for more than five decades.

Rev. Troy Perry performed the first public gay wedding in the United States in 1968, but it was not legally recognized, and in 1970, Metropolitan Community Church filed the first-ever lawsuit seeking legal recognition of same-sex marriages. The lawsuit was not successful. In March 2005, two Unitarian Universalist ministers Kay Greenleaf and Dawn Sangrey were charged with multiple counts of solemnizing a marriage without a license in the State of New York. The charges were the first brought against clergy for performing same-sex unions in North America, according to the Human Rights Campaign, a Washington, D.C.–based gay rights group.

The earliest use of the phrase "commitment ceremony" as an alternative term for "gay wedding" appears to be by Bill Woods who, in 1990, tried to organize a mass "commitment ceremony" for Hawaii's first gay pride parade. Similarly, Reverend Jimmy Creech of the First United Methodist Church performed his first "commitment ceremony" of a same-sex couple in 1990 in North Carolina. In January, 1987, Morningside Monthly Meeting of the Society of Friends became the first Quaker Meeting to take a same-sex marriage (using the word marriage, rather than "commitment ceremony") under its care with the marriage of Reyson Ame and William McCann on 30 May 1987. Although several other Meetings held "Ceremonies of Commitment", Morningside was the first to refer to the relationship as a marriage and afford it equal status. On 26 June 2015, the Supreme Court of the United States ruled in Obergefell v. Hodges that marriage is a fundamental right and must be extended to same-sex couples.

Names for the registered, formal, or solemnized combination of same-sex partners have included "domestic partnership", "civil union", "marriage", "registered partnership", "reciprocal beneficiary", and "same-sex union".

== See also ==
- Adelphopoiesis
- Pederasty in ancient Greece
