= Phaon (freedman) =

1st century AD Roman imperial freedman to Emperor Nero

Phaon was an imperial freedman and confidant of the Roman emperor Nero.

== Early life ==
It is unclear if he was a freedman of Nero or originally came from the Household of Domitia Lepida Minor, whose properties and patronal rights were transferred to Nero after her execution in 54. A "L. Domitius Phaion" is mentioned in an inscription.

== Imperial Court ==
=== Emperor Nero ===
==== Secretary of Treasury (A rationibus) ====
In the Imperial Court, the bureaucracy was run by Greek freedmen. In 55 AD, after the fall of the powerful Secretary of Treasury (A rationibus), Marcus Antonius Pallas, the office at one point may have been held by Phaon. An amphora stamp was found with the inscription "Phaontis | Aug(usti) l(iberti) a rat(ionibus)", which could mean he was the a rationibus of Nero.

While Pallas had been a mastermind of estate management and fiscal control, the economy took a turn to ruination in the second half of the reign of Nero who spent vast amounts of money of different projects.

==== Death of Nero ====
He, with Epaphroditus, Neophytus and Sporus, took Nero to his own villa in the suburban area of Rome where the emperor would commit suicide subsequently on 9 June 68.

== In fiction ==
Phaon appears in the film Quo Vadis (1951) as an architect of Nero, played by D. A. Clarke-Smith.

== Bibliography ==
- Gregory, A. P. (1995). "A study in survival: the case of the freedman C. Domitius Phaon". Athenaeum. Università di Pavia: 401–410. ISSN 0004-6574.
