= Traula gens =

Ancient Roman family

The gens Traula, also found as Traulia or Traullia, was an obscure plebeian family of equestrian rank at ancient Rome. Only one member of this gens seems to be mentioned by Roman writers: Sextus Traulus Montanus, whom Claudius put to death in AD 48. A few others are known from inscriptions.

== Origin ==
The nomen Traulus is of Etruscan derivation, and some of the inscriptions of this gens are from the Etruscan city of Volaterrae.

== Members ==
This list includes abbreviated praenomina. For an explanation of this practice, see filiation.

- Sextus Traulus Montanus, a young eques, was seduced by the empress Messalina, who discarded him immediately thereafter. Despite the brevity of their affair, Claudius had him put to death along with Messalina's various paramours in AD 48.
- Traulus, a potter whose work has been found in Venetia and Histria and Pannonia Superior. His maker's mark seems to identify his partner as Crispinilla, (Note: Nothing in the epigraphy indicates that this is Calvia Crispinilla, the notorious member of Nero's court, or that Traulus should be identified as Sextus Traulus Montanus, whom Claudius had put to death some time earlier; but Dessau suggested that perhaps Montanus was Crispinilla's first husband, rather than the former consul whom she married following the death of Nero.) and their wares have been dated to the middle portion of the first century.
- Traullius Rufinus, one of the leaders of an ala, an allied cavalry unit serving in Pannonia Superior in AD 161.

=== Undated Trauli ===
- Traulia Fortunata, buried at Portus in Latium, along with Aquilia Marcia, in a tomb built by Atimetus Polybianus, a slave of the imperial household.
- Sextus Traulius Hister, buried at Rome, in a tomb built by his wife, Valeria Procula.
- Gaius Traulus C. l. Phoebus, a freedman, and one of the Seviri Augustales, was buried at Volaterrae in Etruria, aged thirty-seven, with a monument from Pergonia Prima.
- Traulus Quadratus, dedicated a tomb at Volaterrae for his wife, Petronia Hetaera.

== See also ==
- List of Roman gentes

== Bibliography ==
- Lucius Annaeus Seneca (Seneca the Younger), Apocolocyntosis Divi Claudii (The Gourdification of the Divine Claudius).
- Publius Cornelius Tacitus, Annales, Historiae.
- Dictionary of Greek and Roman Biography and Mythology, William Smith, ed., Little, Brown and Company, Boston (1849).
- Theodor Mommsen et alii, Corpus Inscriptionum Latinarum (The Body of Latin Inscriptions, abbreviated CIL), Berlin-Brandenburgische Akademie der Wissenschaften (1853–present).
- René Cagnat et alii, L'Année épigraphique (The Year in Epigraphy, abbreviated AE), Presses Universitaires de France (1888–present).
- August Pauly, Georg Wissowa, et alii, Realencyclopädie der Classischen Altertumswissenschaft (Scientific Encyclopedia of the Knowledge of Classical Antiquities, abbreviated RE or PW), J. B. Metzler, Stuttgart (1894–1980).
- Paul von Rohden, Elimar Klebs, & Hermann Dessau, Prosopographia Imperii Romani (The Prosopography of the Roman Empire, abbreviated PIR), Berlin (1898).
- Wilhelm Schulze, Zur Geschichte lateinischer Eigennamen (The History of Latin Proper Names), Weidmannsche Buchhandlung, Berlin (1904).
