= Pythagoras (freedman) =

Roman freedman

- Other names: Doryphorus (likely erroneous)
- Occupation: Freedman
- Known for: Marriage to Nero
- Title: Wine steward

Pythagoras was a freedman of the Roman emperor Nero, whom he allegedly married in a public ceremony in which the emperor took the role of bride. It is unclear if the marriage took place at all, and therefore, if Pythagoras even existed. While the marriage is mentioned by several sources, all of them have been noted as being hostile towards Nero, hurting their credibility. Nero would have been married to Poppaea Sabina at this time, and was seemingly deeply in love with her, to the point of divorcing his previous wife for her, from which he lost a lot of political power. Other sources mention Nero's supposed debauchery, drawing special focus on Nero's relationship with Sporus, a different male whom Nero would later take as his wife, yet any mention of a Pythagoras or Doryphorus is absent, even though it would strengthen his point. Sporus is also said to have played the passive role, seemingly contradicting the narrative that Nero played the role of the bride.

== Life ==
Little is known about Pythagoras' background except that he was a freedman who accompanied Nero.

== Marriage to Nero ==
In the year 64, during the Saturnalia, Tigellinus offered a series of banquets to Nero, after a few days of which Nero allegedly performed a marriage to Pythagoras:

... he stooped to marry himself to one of that filthy herd, by name Pythagoras, with all the forms of regular wedlock. The bridal veil was put over the emperor; people saw the witnesses of the ceremony, the wedding dower, the couch and the nuptial torches; everything in a word was plainly visible, which, even when a woman weds, darkness hides.

== Doryphorus ==
Suetonius tells the story of Nero's being the bride to a freedman named "Doryphorus". Both Tacitus and Dio Cassius mention only "Pythagoras". According to Champlin, it is improbable that a second imperial wedding occurred without being noted, and the simplest solution is that Suetonius mistook the name. Doryphorus, one of the wealthiest and most powerful of Nero's freedmen, died in the year 62 before the banquets of Tigellinus, where Nero, covered with skins of wild animals, was let loose from a cage and attacked the genitalia of men and women bound to stakes, after which he was dispatched by his freedman "Doryphorus". As "doryphoros" means "spear bearer" (Δορυφόρος) like the statue, it may be that the Latinized word had just capitalized the Greek word.

== Bibliography ==
- Suetonius. Nero. 29
- Champlin, Edward (2005). Nero. Harvard University Press. p. 346. ISBN 978-0-674-01822-8.

== See also ==
- History of same-sex unions
- Homosexuality in ancient Rome
- Sporus
