= Tomb of Publius Vibius Marianus =

Ancient Roman site

The Tomb of Publius Vibius Marianus is an Ancient Roman marble monument located along the Via Cassia, a few kilometers outside of the Porta Popola of Rome. For centuries, the sarcophagus has been erroneously referred as the Tomb of Nero referring to the Roman Emperor. The location became a popular spot to visit by Grand Tour travellers and many artists have illustrated it since the 16th century.

== Description ==
Publius Vibius Marianus was born in the colony of Julia Dertona (modern Tortona) in north Italy. He was a Roman soldier and bureaucrat, who ascended through the ladders of military service throughout the empire to tribune. His father, also Publius, was a former pro-consul. He is presumed to have lived during the era of Emperor Septimius Severus. The monument was erected by his daughter, Vibia Maria Maxima.

The inscription reads:

D(is) M(anibus) s(acrum)
P(ublii) Vibi P(ublii) f(ilii) Mariani e(gregiae) m(emoriae) v(iro), proc(uratori)
et praesidi prov(inciae) Sardiniae, p(rimo) p(ilo) bis,
trib(uno) coh(ortium) X pr(aetoriae), XI urb(anae), IIII vig(ilum) praef(ecto) leg(ionis)
II Ital(icae), p(rimo) p(ilo) leg(ionis) III Gall(icae), (centurioni) frument(ario)
oriundo ex Ital(ia) Jul(ia) Dertona
patri dulcissimo
et Reginiae Maxime matri
Karissimae
Vibia Maria Maxima c(larissima) f(emina), fil(ia) et her(es)

Flanking the epigraph are two young soldiers surrounded by artifacts. While the upper corners are two kneeling angels holding a military cap. On the sides are two eagles capturing a snake, flanking a soldier. Below is the depiction of a griffon.

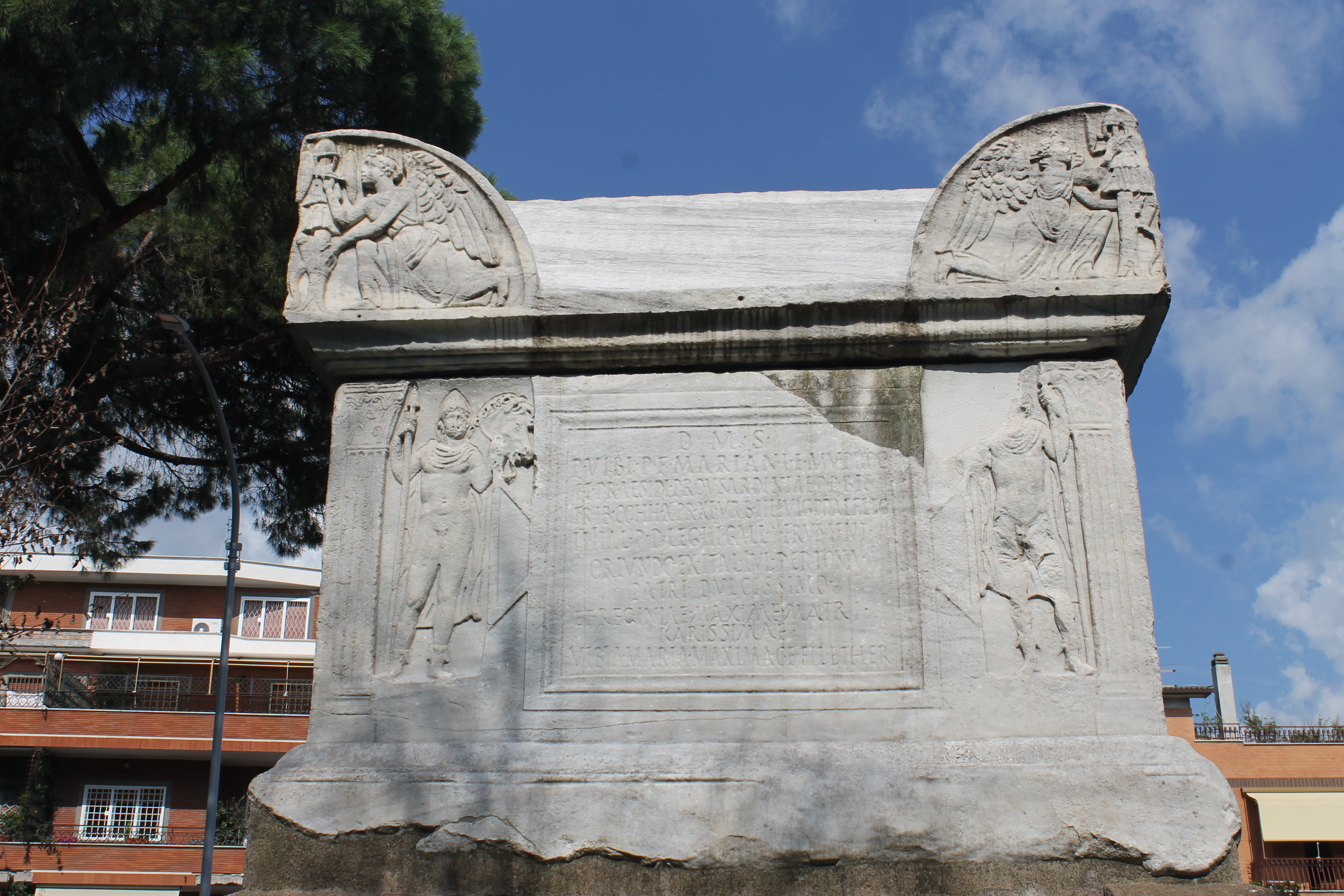
Front view with epigraph

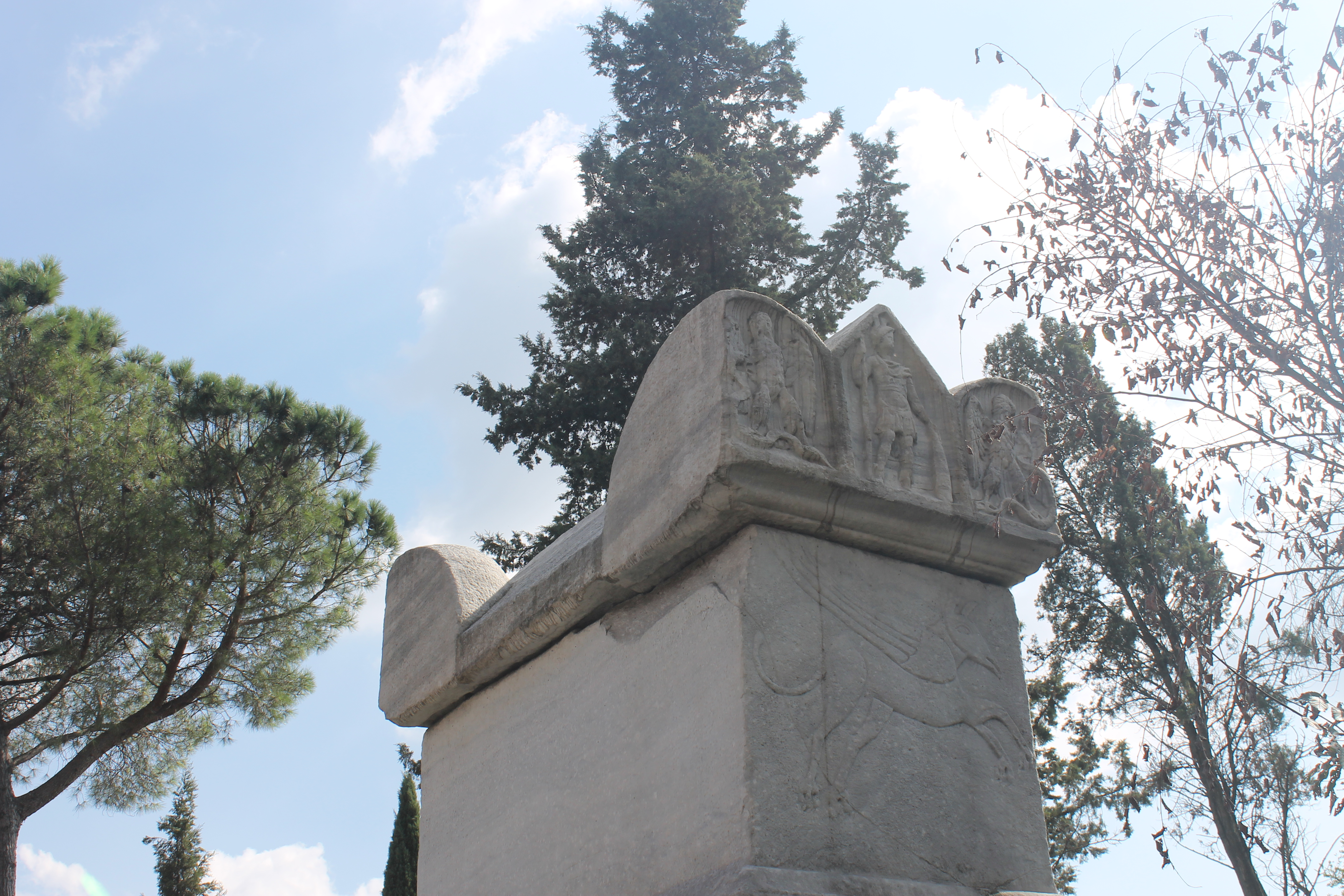
Side view.

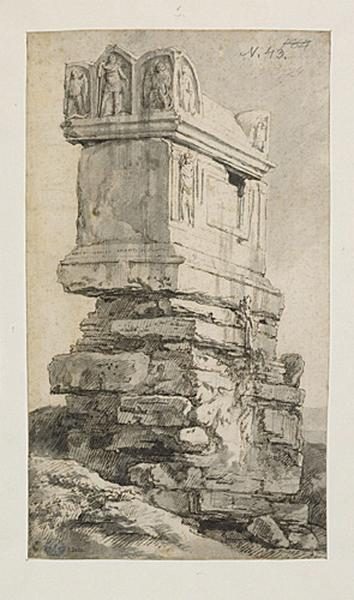
Depiction by Jan Frans van Bloemen
