= Nero =

Roman emperor from AD 54 to 68

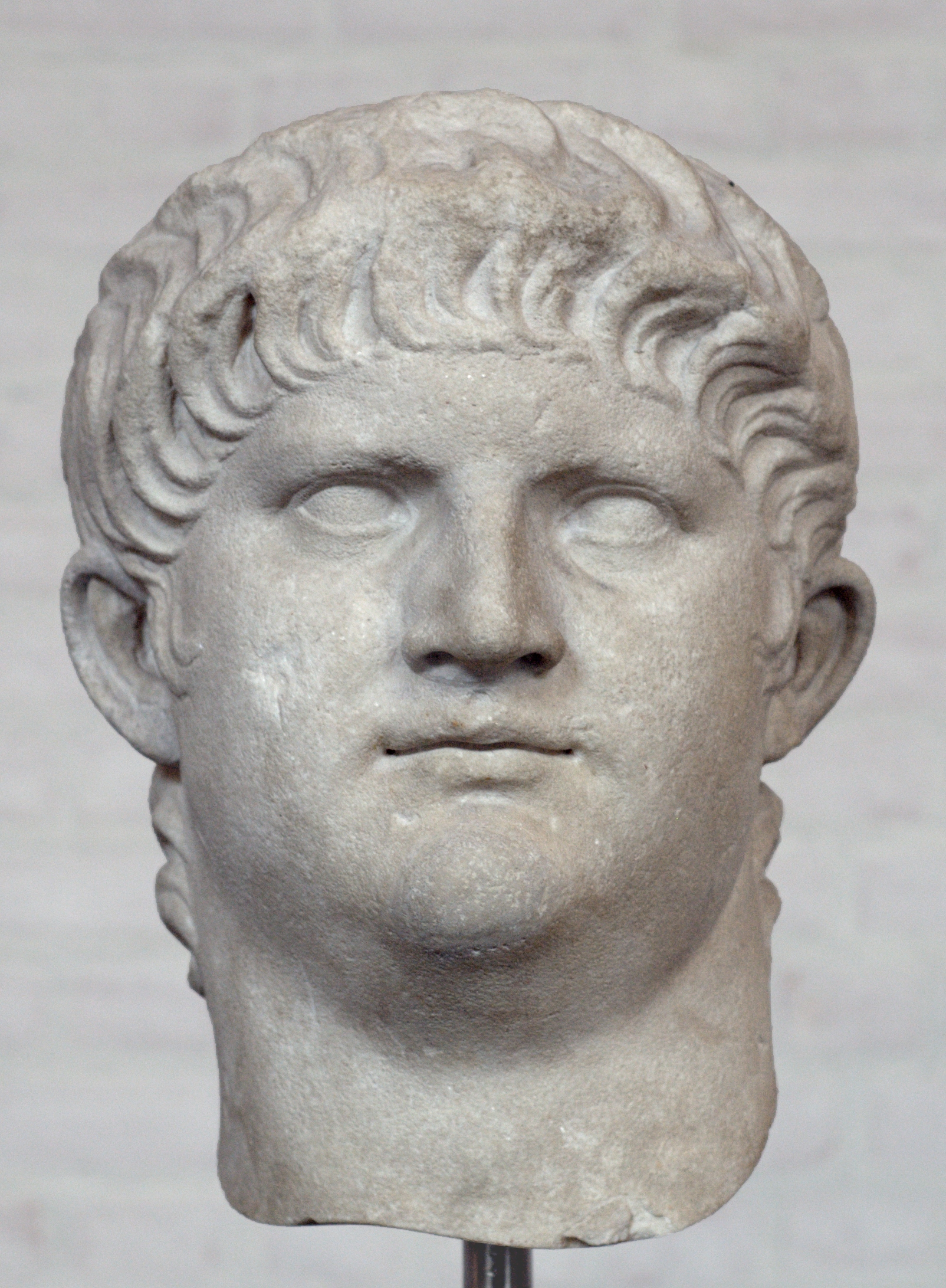
- Roman marble head of Nero from an oversized statue, Glyptothek museum

Roman emperor
- Reign: 13 October 54 – 9 June 68
- Predecessor: Claudius
- Successor: Galba
- Born: Lucius Domitius Ahenobarbus; 15 December AD 37; Antium, Italy, Roman Empire
- Died: 9 June AD 68 (aged 30) outside Rome, Italy
- Cause of death: Forced suicide
- Burial: Mausoleum of the Domitii Ahenobarbi, Pincian Hill, Rome
- Spouses: Claudia Octavia; Poppaea Sabina; Statilia Messalina; Sporus; Pythagoras
- Issue: Claudia Augusta
Names
- Nero Claudius Caesar Drusus Germanicus
Regnal name
- Nero Claudius Caesar Augustus Germanicus
- Dynasty: Julio-Claudian
- Father: Gnaeus Domitius Ahenobarbus; Claudius (adoptive)
- Mother: Agrippina the Younger

Nero Claudius Caesar Augustus Germanicus (born Lucius Domitius Ahenobarbus, later Nero Claudius Caesar Drusus Germanicus; 15 December AD 37 – 9 June AD 68) was Roman emperor from AD 54 until his suicide in AD 68. He was the final emperor of the Julio-Claudian dynasty, which comprised the first five emperors.

Nero was born at Antium in AD 37, the son of Gnaeus Domitius Ahenobarbus and Agrippina the Younger (great-granddaughter of the emperor Augustus). Nero was three when his father died. By the time Nero turned eleven, his mother married Emperor Claudius, who then adopted Nero as his heir. Upon Claudius's death in AD 54, Nero ascended to the throne with the backing of the Praetorian Guard and the Senate. In the early years of his reign, Nero was advised and guided by his mother Agrippina, his tutor Seneca the Younger, and his praetorian prefect Sextus Afranius Burrus, but sought to rule independently and rid himself of restraining influences. The power struggle between Nero and his mother reached its climax when he orchestrated her murder. Roman sources also implicate Nero in the deaths of both his wife Claudia Octavia – supposedly so he could marry Poppaea Sabina – and his stepbrother Britannicus.

Nero's practical contributions to Rome's governance focused on diplomacy, trade, and culture. He ordered the construction of amphitheaters, and promoted athletic games and contests. He made public appearances as an actor, poet, musician, and charioteer, which scandalized his aristocratic contemporaries as these occupations were usually the domain of slaves, public entertainers, and infamous persons. However, the provision of such entertainments made Nero popular among lower-class citizens. The costs involved were borne by local elites either directly or through taxation, and were much resented by the Roman aristocracy.

During Nero's reign, the general Corbulo fought the Roman–Parthian War of 58–63, and made peace with the hostile Parthian Empire. The Roman general Suetonius Paulinus quashed a major revolt in Britain led by queen Boudica. The Bosporan Kingdom was briefly annexed to the empire, and the First Jewish–Roman War began. When the Roman senator Vindex rebelled, with support from the eventual Roman emperor Galba, Nero was declared a public enemy and condemned to death in absentia. He fled Rome, and on 9 June AD 68 committed suicide. His death sparked a brief period of civil war known as the Year of the Four Emperors.

Most Roman sources offer overwhelmingly negative assessments of his personality and reign. Most contemporary sources describe him as tyrannical, self-indulgent, and debauched. The historian Tacitus claims the Roman people thought him compulsive and corrupt. Suetonius tells that many Romans believed the Great Fire of Rome was instigated by Nero to clear land for his planned "Golden House". Tacitus claims Nero seized Christians as scapegoats for the fire and had them burned alive, seemingly motivated not by public justice, but personal cruelty. Some modern historians question the reliability of ancient sources on Nero's tyrannical acts, considering his popularity among the Roman commoners. In the eastern provinces of the Empire, a popular legend arose that Nero had not died and would return. After his death, at least three leaders of short-lived, failed rebellions presented themselves as "Nero reborn" to gain popular support.

== Early life ==
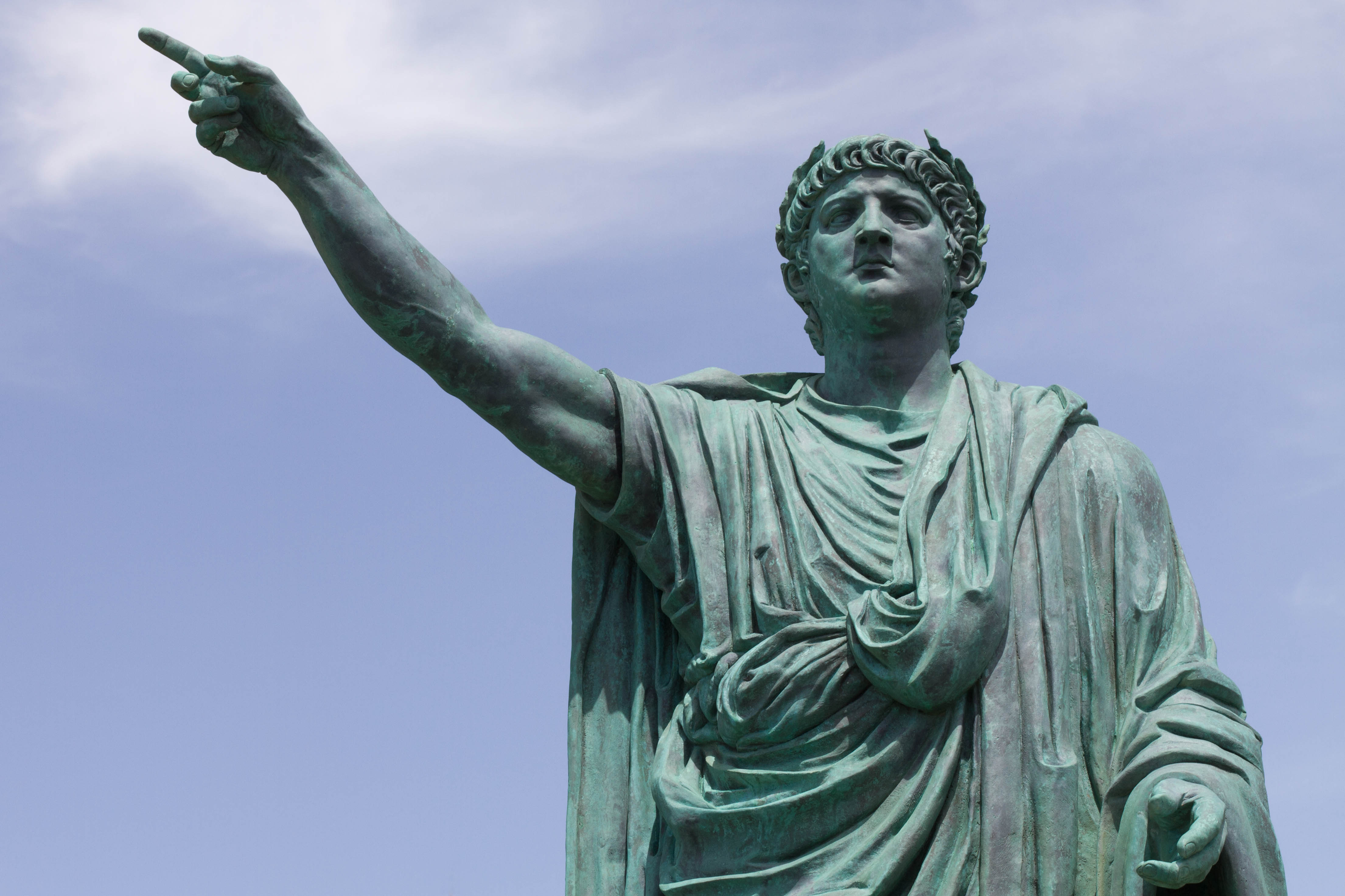
Statue of Nero in his birthplace of Anzio, Italy

Nero was born Lucius Domitius Ahenobarbus on 15 December AD 37 in Antium (modern Anzio), the only child of the politician Gnaeus Domitius Ahenobarbus and Agrippina the Younger. His maternal uncle was the reigning Roman emperor, Caligula. Nero was also the great-great-grandson of former emperor Augustus (descended from Augustus' only daughter, Julia).

The ancient biographer Suetonius, who was critical of Nero's ancestors, wrote that emperor Augustus had reproached Nero's grandfather for his unseemly enjoyment of violent gladiator games. According to Jürgen Malitz, Suetonius tells that Nero's father Domitius was known to be "irascible and brutal", and that both "enjoyed chariot races and theater performances to a degree not befitting their position". Suetonius also mentions that when Domitius was congratulated by his friends for the birth of his son, he replied that any child born to him and Agrippina would have a detestable nature and become a public danger.

Around AD 39 Nero's mother Agrippina was implicated in a plot concocted by Marcus Aemilius Lepidus and targeting Caligula. The emperor then exiled his sisters Agrippina and Livilla to a remote island in the Mediterranean Sea. Domitius himself died around AD 40, not before gaining notoriety for his involvement in a series of corruption and political scandals. Caligula took Nero's paternal inheritance and sent him to live with his paternal aunt Domitia Lepida, the mother of later emperor Claudius's third wife, Messalina.

After Caligula's death, Claudius became the new emperor. Nero's mother married Claudius in AD 49, becoming his fourth wife. (Note: Tacitus wrote the following about Agrippina's marriage to Claudius: "From this moment the country was transformed. Complete obedience was accorded to a woman—and not a woman like Messalina who toyed with national affairs. This was a rigorous, almost masculine, despotism. In public, Agrippina was austere and often arrogant. Her private life was chaste—unless power was to be gained. Her passion to acquire money was unbounded; she wanted it as a stepping stone to supremacy.") On 25 February AD 50, (Note: The date is recorded in the Acta Arvalia and the year was "in the consulate of Gaius Antistius and Marcus Suillius". Suetonius states that Nero was "in the eleventh year of his age", which is most likely a mistake.) Claudius was pressured to adopt Nero as his son, giving him the new name of "Nero Claudius Caesar Drusus Germanicus". (Note: For further information see adoption in Rome.) Claudius had gold coins issued to mark the adoption. Classics professor Josiah Osgood has written that "the coins, through their distribution and imagery alike, showed that a new Leader was in the making." However, David Shotter noted that, despite events in Rome, Nero's step-brother Britannicus was more prominent in provincial coinages during the early 50s.

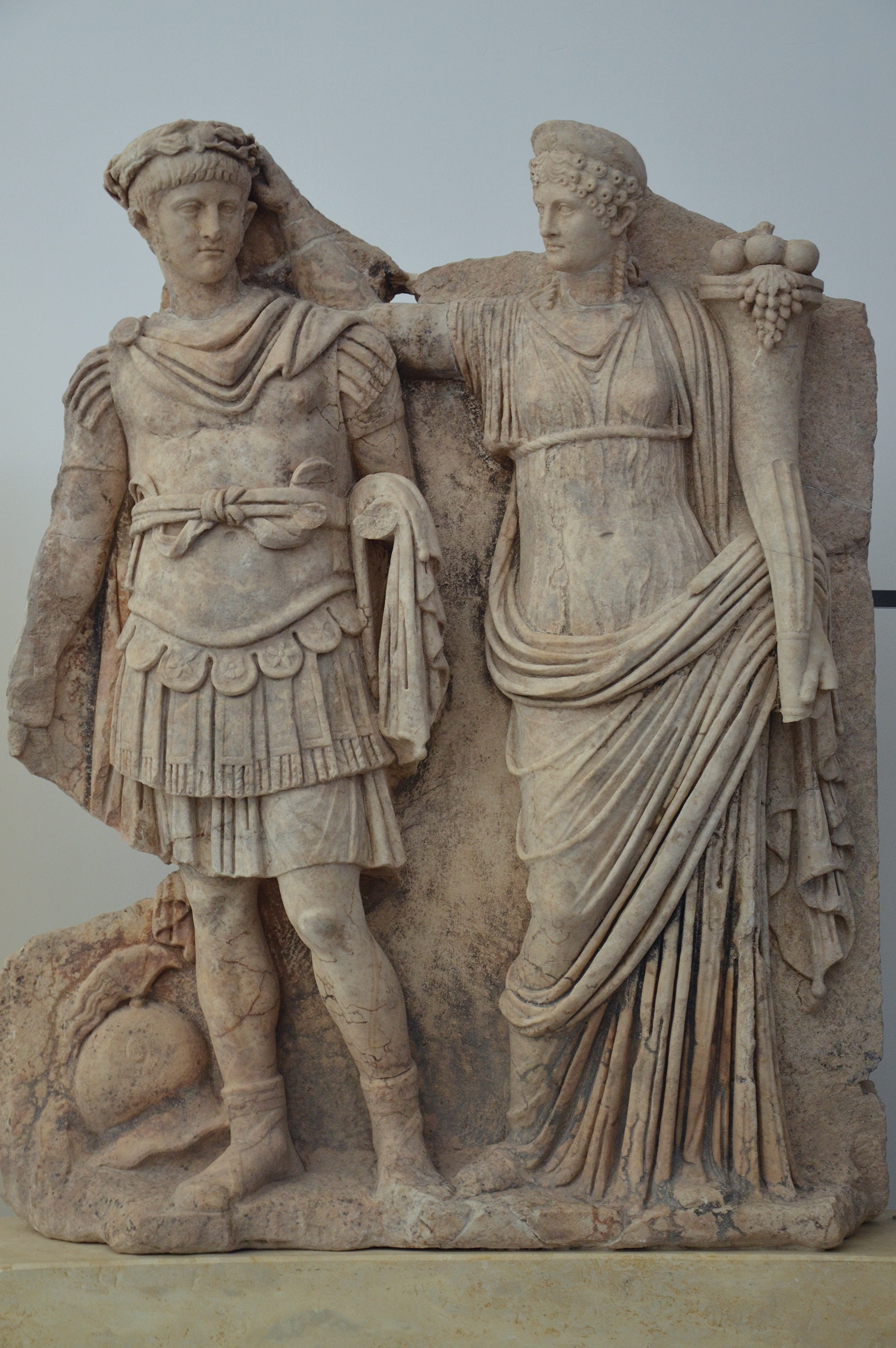
Relief from the Sebasteion depicting Nero and his mother, Agrippina

Nero formally entered public life as an adult in AD 51 while 13 years old. When he turned 16, Nero married Claudius' daughter (his step-sister), Claudia Octavia. Between the years AD 51 and AD 53, he gave several speeches on behalf of various communities, including the Ilians; the Apameans (requesting a five-year tax reprieve after an earthquake); and the northern colony of Bologna, after their settlement had suffered a devastating fire.

Claudius died in AD 54; many ancient historians claim that he was poisoned by Agrippina. Shotter has written that "Claudius' death...has usually been regarded as an event hastened by Agrippina, due to signs that Claudius was showing a renewed affection for his natural son." He notes that among ancient sources, the Roman historian Josephus was uniquely reserved in describing the poisoning as a rumor. Contemporary sources differ in their accounts of the poisoning. Tacitus says that the poison-maker Locusta prepared the toxin, which was served to the Emperor by his servant Halotus. Tacitus also writes that Agrippina arranged for Claudius' doctor Xenophon to administer poison, in the event that the Emperor survived. Suetonius differs in some details, but also implicates Halotus and Agrippina. (Note: Suetonius wrote "That Claudius was poisoned is the general belief, but when it was done and by whom is disputed. Some say that it was his taster, the eunuch Halotus, as he was banqueting on the Citadel with the priests; others that at a family dinner Agrippina served the drug to him with her own hand in mushrooms, a dish of which he was extravagantly fond.. His death was kept quiet until all the arrangements were made about the succession.") Like Tacitus, Cassius Dio writes that the poison was prepared by Locusta, but in Dio's account it is administered by Agrippina instead of Halotus. In Apocolocyntosis, Seneca the Younger does not mention mushrooms at all. Agrippina's involvement in Claudius' death is not accepted by all modern scholars.

Before Claudius' death, Agrippina had maneuvered to remove Claudius' sons' tutors in order to replace them with tutors that she had selected. She was also able to convince Claudius to replace two prefects of the Praetorian Guard (who were suspected of supporting Claudius' son) with Afranius Burrus (Nero's future guide). Since Agrippina had replaced the guard officers with men loyal to her, Nero was subsequently able to assume power without incident.

== Reign (AD 54–68) ==
The main ancient Roman literary sources for Nero's reign are Tacitus, Suetonius and Cassius Dio. They found Nero's construction projects overly extravagant and claim that their cost left Italy "thoroughly exhausted by contributions of money" with "the provinces ruined". Modern historians note that the period was riddled with deflation and that Nero intended his spending on public-work and charities to ease economic troubles.

=== Early reign ===
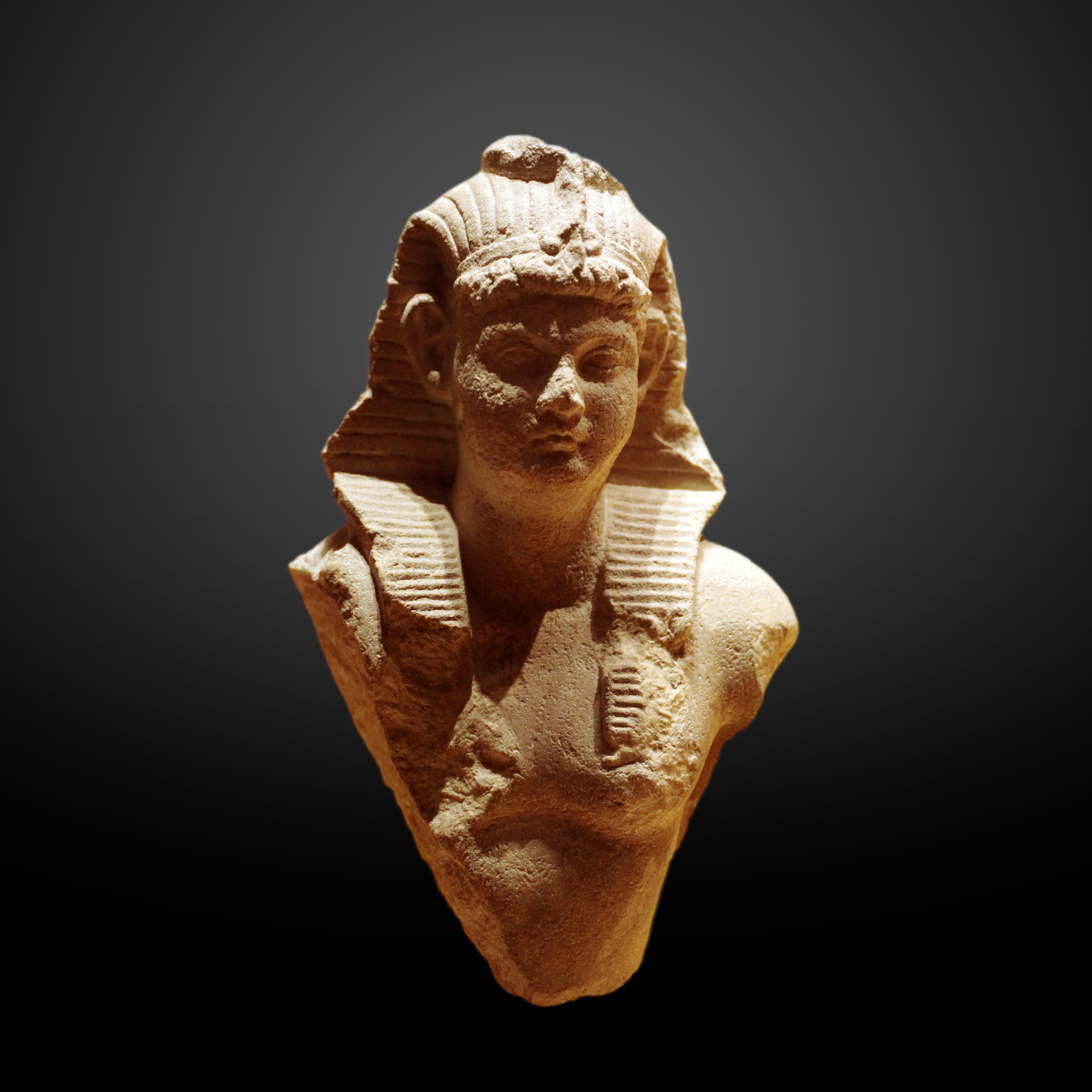
Bust of Nero as pharaoh

Nero became emperor in AD 54, aged 16. His tutor, Seneca, prepared Nero's first speech before the Senate. During this speech, Nero spoke about "eliminating the ills of the previous regime". H. H. Scullard writes that "he promised to follow the Augustan model in his principate, to end all secret trials intra cubiculum, to have done with the corruption of court favorites and freedmen, and above all to respect the privileges of the Senate and individual Senators." His respect for Senatorial autonomy, which distinguished him from Caligula and Claudius, was generally well received by the Roman Senate.

Scullard writes that Nero's mother, Agrippina, "meant to rule through her son". Agrippina murdered her political rivals: Domitia Lepida the Younger, the aunt that Nero had lived with during Agrippina's exile; Marcus Junius Silanus, a great-grandson of Augustus; and Narcissus. One of the earliest coins that Nero issued during his reign shows Agrippina on the coin's obverse side; usually, this would be reserved for a portrait of the emperor. The Senate also allowed Agrippina two lictors during public appearances, an honor that was customarily bestowed upon only magistrates and the Vestalis Maxima.

In AD 55, Nero removed Agrippina's ally Marcus Antonius Pallas from his position in the treasury. Shotter writes the following about Agrippina's deteriorating relationship with Nero: "What Seneca and Burrus probably saw as relatively harmless in Nero—his cultural pursuits and his affair with the slave girl Claudia Acte—were to her signs of her son's dangerous emancipation of himself from her influence." Britannicus was poisoned after Agrippina threatened to side with him. Nero, who was having an affair with Acte, (Note: Sources describe Acte as a slave girl (Shotter) and a freedwoman (Champlin and Scullard).) exiled Agrippina from the palace when she began to cultivate a relationship with his wife Octavia.

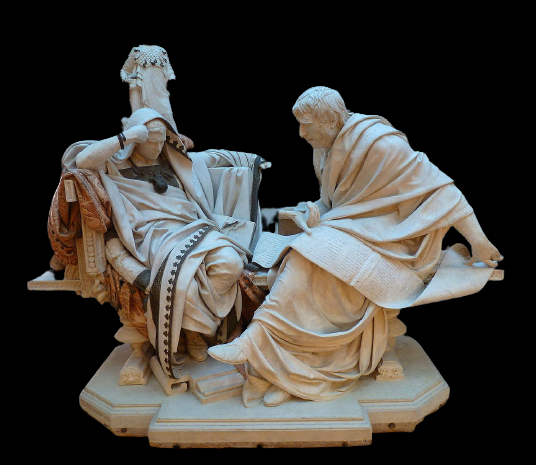
Emperor Nero being instructed by Seneca, work by Spanish sculptor Eduardo Barrón

Jürgen Malitz writes that ancient sources do not provide any clear evidence to evaluate the extent of Nero's personal involvement in politics during the first years of his reign. He describes the policies that are explicitly attributed to Nero as "well-meant but incompetent notions" like Nero's failed initiative to abolish all taxes in AD 58. Scholars generally credit Nero's advisors Burrus and Seneca with the administrative successes of these years. Malitz writes that in later years, Nero panicked when he had to make decisions on his own during times of crisis.

Nevertheless, his early administration ruled to great acclaim. A generation later those years were seen in retrospect as an exemplar of good and moderate government and described as Quinquennium Neronis by Trajan. Especially well received were fiscal reforms which among others put tax collectors under more strict control by establishing local offices to supervise their activities. After the affair of Lucius Pedanius Secundus, who was murdered by a desperate slave, Nero allowed slaves to file complaints about their treatment to the authorities.

Nero was very popular among commoners.

=== Residences ===
Outside of Rome, Nero had several villas or palaces built, the ruins of which can still be seen today. These included the Villa of Nero at Antium, his place of birth, where he razed the villa on the site to rebuild it on a more massive and imperial scale and including a theatre. At Subiaco, Lazio, near Rome he had 3 artificial lakes built, with waterfalls, bridges and walkways for the luxurious villa. He stayed at the Villa of Nero at Olympia, Greece, during his participation at the Olympic Games of AD 67.

=== Matricide ===
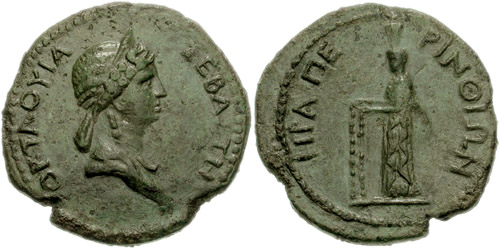
Coin of Claudia Octavia

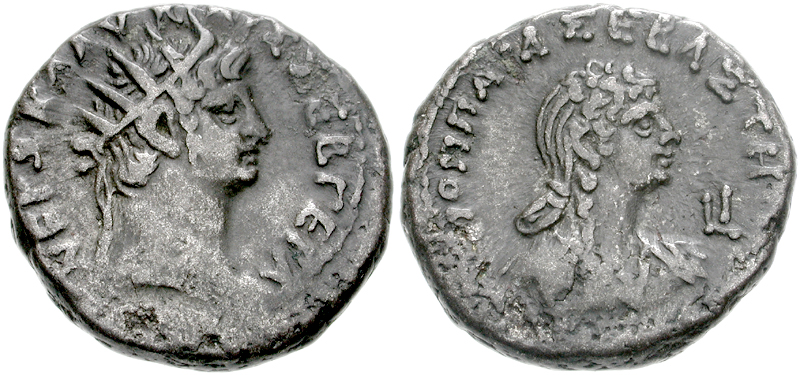
Coin of Nero and Poppaea Sabina Billon tetradrachm of Alexandria, Egypt, 25 mm, 12.51 gr. Obverse: radiate head right; ΝΕΡΩ. ΚΛΑΥ. ΚΑΙΣ. ΣΕΒ. ΓΕΡ. ΑΥ. Reverse: draped bust of Poppaea right; ΠΟΠΠΑΙΑ ΣΕΒΑΣΤΗ. Year LI = 10 = 63–64.

According to Suetonius, Nero had his former freedman Anicetus arrange a shipwreck, which Agrippina managed to survive. She then swam ashore and was executed by Anicetus, who reported her death as a suicide. The Oxford Encyclopedia of Ancient Greece and Rome cautiously notes that Nero's reasons for killing his mother in AD 59 are "not fully understood". According to Tacitus, the source of conflict between Nero and his mother was Nero's affair with Poppaea Sabina. In Histories Tacitus writes that the affair began while Poppaea was still married to Rufrius Crispinus, but in his later work Annals Tacitus says Poppaea was married to Otho when the affair began.

In Annals, Tacitus writes that Agrippina opposed Nero's affair with Poppaea because of her affection for his wife Octavia. Anthony A. Barrett writes that Tacitus' account in Annals "suggests that Poppaea's challenge drove [Nero] over the brink". A number of modern historians have noted that Agrippina's death would not have offered much advantage for Poppaea, as Nero did not marry Poppaea until AD 62. Barrett writes that Poppaea seems to serve as a "literary device, utilized [by Tacitus] because [he] could see no plausible explanation for Nero's conduct and also incidentally [served] to show that Nero, like Claudius, had fallen under the malign influence of a woman."

=== Decline ===
Modern scholars believe that Nero's reign had been going well in the years before Agrippina's death. For example, Nero promoted the exploration of the Nile river sources with a successful expedition. After Agrippina's exile, Burrus and Seneca were responsible for the administration of the Empire. However, Nero's "conduct became far more egregious" after his mother's death. Miriam T. Griffin suggests that Nero's decline began as early as AD 55 with the murder of his stepbrother Britannicus, but also notes that "Nero lost all sense of right and wrong and listened to flattery with total credulity" after Agrippina's death. Griffin points out that Tacitus "makes explicit the significance of Agrippina's removal for Nero's conduct".

Nero began to build a new palace, the Domus Transitoria, from about AD 60. It was intended to connect all of the imperial estates that had been acquired in various ways, linking the Palatine with the Gardens of Maecenas, Horti Lamiani, Horti Lolliani, etc. In AD 62, Nero's adviser Burrus died. That same year, Nero called for the first treason trial of his reign (maiestas trial) against Antistius Sosianus. He also executed his rivals Cornelius Sulla and Rubellius Plautus. Jürgen Malitz considers this to be a turning point in Nero's relationship with the Roman Senate. Malitz writes that "Nero abandoned the restraint he had previously shown because he believed a course supporting the Senate promised to be less and less profitable."

After Burrus' death, Nero appointed two new Praetorian prefects: Faenius Rufus and Ofonius Tigellinus. Politically isolated, Seneca was forced to retire. According to Tacitus, Nero divorced Octavia on grounds of infertility, and banished her. After public protests over Octavia's exile, Nero accused her of adultery with Anicetus, and she was executed. In AD 64 during the Saturnalia, Nero is said to have married Pythagoras, a freedman.

=== Great Fire of Rome ===
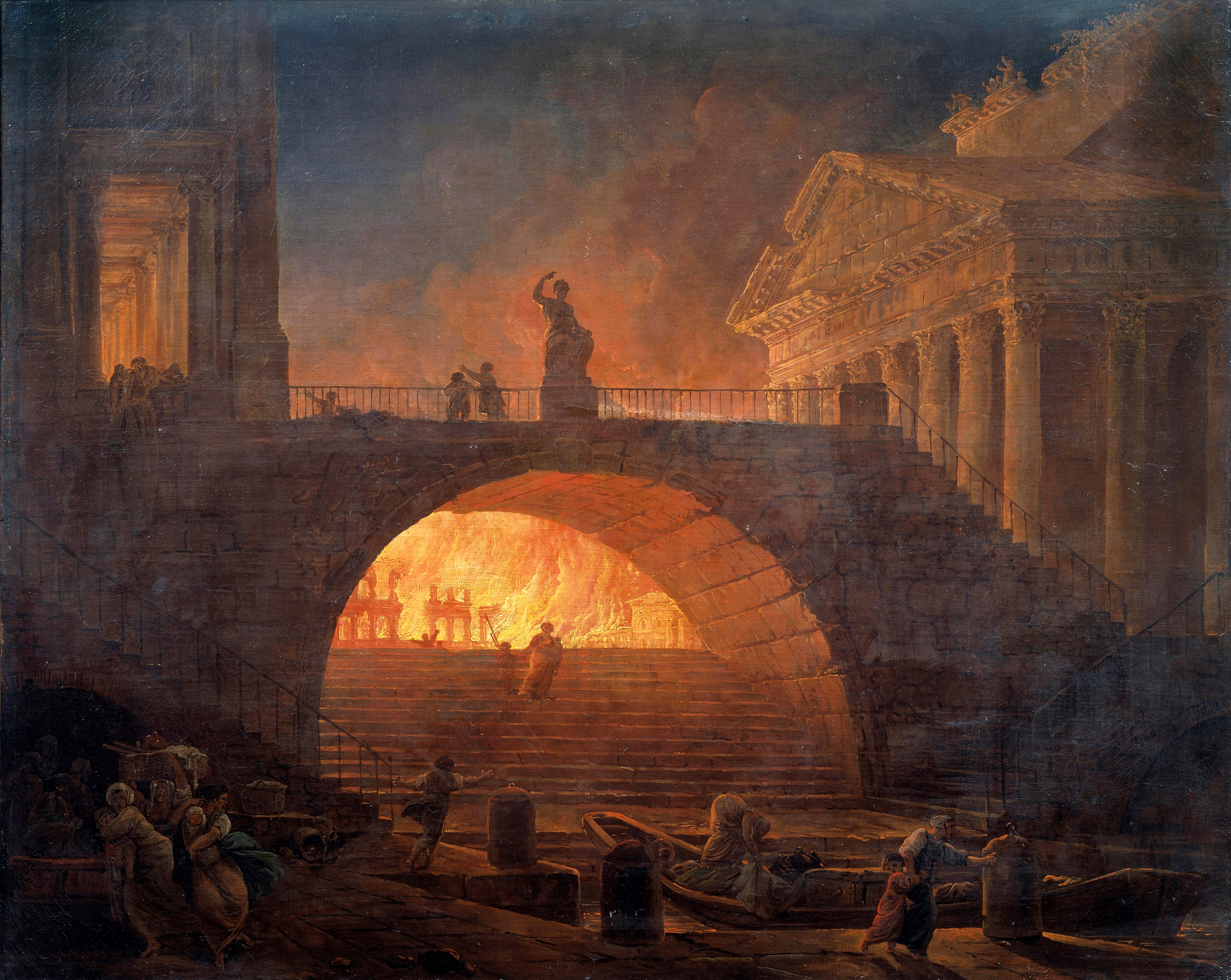
The Fire of Rome by Hubert Robert (1785)

The Great Fire of Rome began on the night of 18 to 19 July 64, probably in one of the merchant shops on the slope of the Aventine overlooking the Circus Maximus, or in the wooden outer seating of the Circus itself. Rome had always been vulnerable to fires, and this one was fanned to catastrophic proportions by the winds. Tacitus, Cassius Dio, and modern archaeology describe the destruction of mansions, ordinary residences, public buildings, and temples on the Aventine, Palatine, and Caelian hills. The fire burned for over seven days before subsiding; it then started again and burned for three more. It destroyed three of Rome's 14 districts and severely damaged seven more.

Some Romans thought the fire an accident, as the merchant shops were timber-framed and sold flammable goods, and the outer seating stands of the Circus were timber-built. Others claimed it was arson committed on Nero's behalf. The accounts by Pliny the Elder, Suetonius, and Cassius Dio suggest several possible reasons for Nero's alleged arson, including his creation of a real-life backdrop to a theatrical performance about the burning of Troy. Suetonius wrote that Nero started the fire to clear the site for his planned palatial Golden House. This would include lush artificial landscapes and a 30-meter-tall statue of himself, the Colossus of Nero, the site of its construction would become known as the Colosseum, though later the famous Flavian Amphitheater was built, and to posterity the word 'Colosseum' was incorrectly misappropriated as the name of the theater. Suetonius and Cassius Dio claim that Nero sang the "Sack of Ilium" in stage costume while the city burned. The popular legend that Nero played the lyre while Rome burned "is at least partly a literary construct of Flavian propaganda ... which looked askance on the abortive Neronian attempt to rewrite Augustan models of rule".

Tacitus suspends judgment on Nero's responsibility for the fire; he found that Nero was in Antium when the fire started, and returned to Rome to organize a relief effort, providing for the removal of bodies and debris, which he paid for from his own funds. After the fire, Nero opened his palaces to provide shelter for the homeless, and arranged for food supplies to be delivered in order to prevent starvation among the survivors. Tacitus writes that to remove suspicion from himself, Nero accused Christians of starting the fire. According to this account, many Christians were arrested and brutally executed by "being thrown to the beasts, crucified, and being burned alive". Tacitus asserts that in his imposition of such ferocious punishments, Nero was not motivated by a sense of justice, but by a penchant for personal cruelty. Houses built after the fire were spaced out, built in brick, and faced by porticos on wide roads. Nero also built himself a new palace complex known as the Domus Aurea in an area cleared by the fire. The cost to rebuild Rome was immense, requiring funds the state treasury did not have. To find the necessary funds for the reconstruction, Nero's government increased taxation. Particularly heavy tributes were imposed on the provinces of the empire. To meet at least a portion of the costs, Nero devalued the Roman currency, increasing inflationary pressure for the first time in the Empire's history. (Note: Nero or his moneyers reduced the weight of the denarius from 84 per Roman pound to 96 (3.80 grams to 3.30 grams). He also reduced the silver purity from 99.5% to 93.5%—the silver weight dropping from 3.80 grams to 2.97 grams. He also reduced the weight of the aureus from 40 per Roman pound to 45 (7.9 grams to 7.2 grams). Tulane University hand-out, archived.)

=== Later years ===
In AD 65, Gaius Calpurnius Piso, a Roman statesman, organized a conspiracy against Nero with the help of Subrius Flavus and Sulpicius Asper, a tribune and a centurion of the Praetorian Guard. According to Tacitus, many conspirators wished to "rescue the state" from the emperor and restore the Republic. The freedman Milichus discovered the conspiracy and reported it to Nero's secretary, Epaphroditus. As a result, the conspiracy failed and its members were executed, including Lucan, the poet. Nero's previous advisor Seneca was accused by Natalis; he denied the charges but was still ordered to commit suicide, as by this point he had fallen out of favor with Nero.

Nero was said to have kicked Poppaea to death in AD 65, before she could give birth to his second child. Modern historians, noting the probable biases of Suetonius, Tacitus, and Cassius Dio, and the likely absence of eyewitnesses to such an event, propose that Poppaea may have died after miscarriage or in childbirth. Nero went into deep mourning; Poppaea was given a sumptuous state funeral and divine honors, and was promised a temple for her cult. A year's importation of incense was burned at the funeral. Her body was not cremated, as would have been strictly customary, but embalmed after the Egyptian manner and entombed; it is not known where.

In AD 66, Nero funded a lavish expedition to Africa on nothing more than the promises of Cesellius Bassus that he knew where to find a hoard of buried gold, left behind by the legendary queen Dido. Bassus was either a charlatan or delusional, and no gold was ever found, though many writers noted that Nero was spending as if the gold would imminently arrive any day. In AD 67, Nero married Sporus, a young boy who is said to have greatly resembled Poppaea. Nero had him castrated and married him with all the usual ceremonies, including a dowry and a bridal veil.

=== Revolt of Vindex and Galba and Nero's death ===
In March 68, Gaius Julius Vindex, the governor of Gallia Lugdunensis, rebelled against Nero's tax policies. Lucius Verginius Rufus, the governor of Germania Superior, was ordered to put down Vindex's rebellion. In an attempt to gain support from outside his own province, Vindex called upon Servius Sulpicius Galba, the governor of Hispania Tarraconensis, to join the rebellion and to declare himself emperor in opposition to Nero.

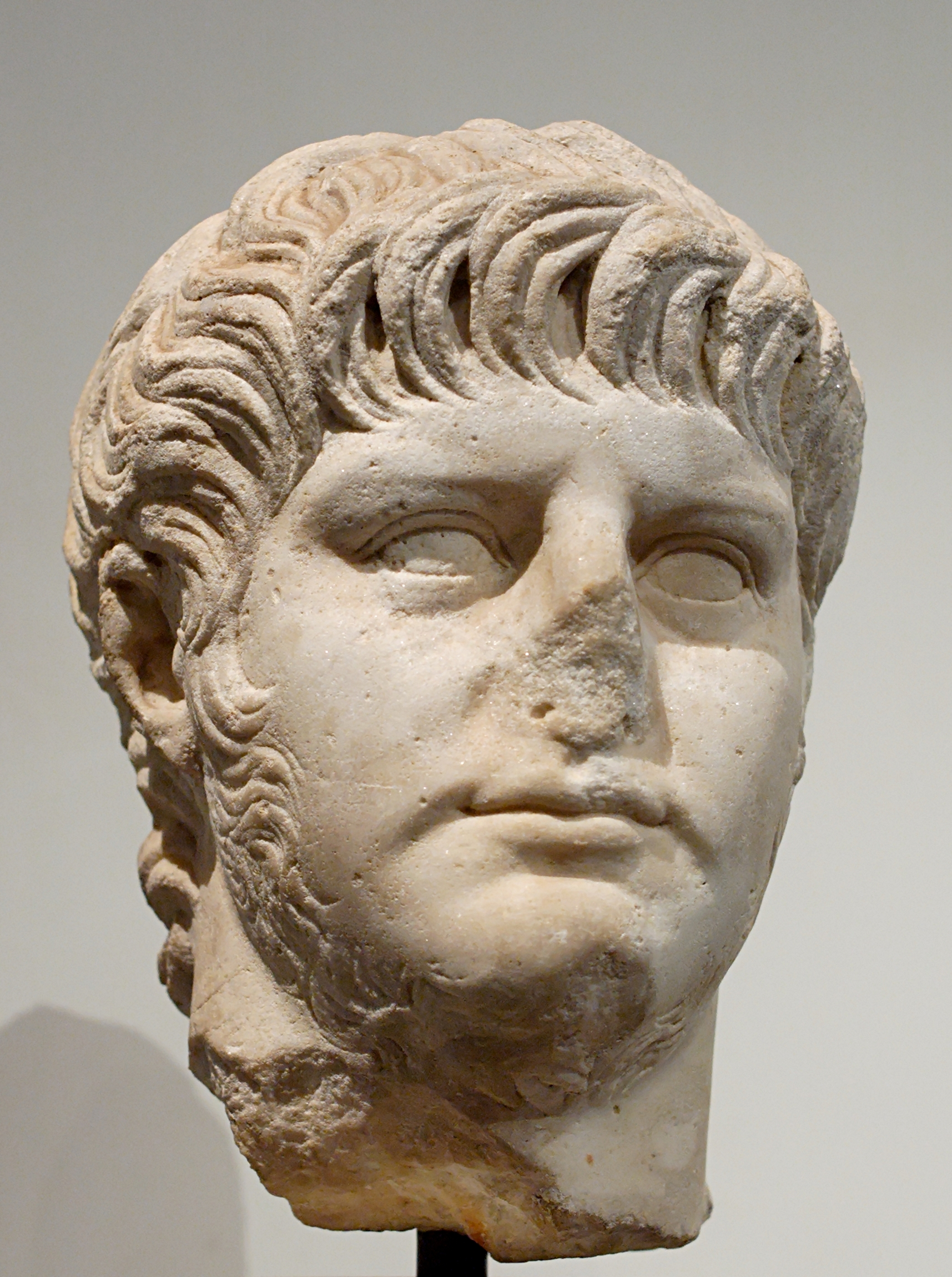
A marble bust of Nero, Antiquarium of the Palatine.

At the Battle of Vesontio in May 68, Verginius' forces easily defeated those of Vindex, and the latter committed suicide. However, after defeating the rebel, Verginius' legions attempted to proclaim their own commander as Emperor. Verginius refused to act against Nero, but the discontent of the legions of Germania and the continued opposition of Galba in Hispania did not bode well for him. While Nero had retained some control of the situation, support for Galba increased despite his being officially declared a "public enemy". The prefect of the Praetorian Guard, Gaius Nymphidius Sabinus, also abandoned his allegiance to the Emperor and came out in support of Galba.

In response, Nero fled Rome with the intention of going to the port of Ostia and, from there, to take a fleet to one of the still-loyal eastern provinces. According to Suetonius, Nero abandoned the idea when some army officers openly refused to flee with him — one of them going so far as to quote Turnus's line from Virgil's Aeneid: "Is it so dreadful a thing, then, to die?" Nero then toyed with the idea of fleeing to Parthia, throwing himself upon the mercy of Galba, or appealing to the people and begging them to pardon him for his past offences "and if he could not soften their hearts, to entreat them at least to allow him the prefecture of Egypt". Suetonius reports that the text of this speech was later found in Nero's writing desk, but that he dared not give it from fear of being torn to pieces before he could reach the Forum.

Nero returned to Rome and spent the evening in the palace. After sleeping, he awoke at about midnight to find the palace guard had left. Dispatching messages to his friends' palace chambers for them to come, he received no answers. Upon going to their chambers personally, he found them all abandoned. When he called for a gladiator or anyone else adept with a sword to kill him, no one appeared. He cried, "Have I neither friend nor foe?" and ran out as if to throw himself into the Tiber. Returning, Nero sought a place where he could hide and collect his thoughts. An imperial freedman, Phaon, offered his villa, 4 mi (6.4 km) outside the city. Travelling in disguise, Nero and four loyal freedmen — Epaphroditus, Phaon, Neophytus, and Sporus — reached the villa, whereupon Nero ordered them to dig a grave for him. At this time, Nero learned that the Senate had declared him a public enemy. Nero prepared himself for suicide, pacing up and down muttering Qualis artifex pereo ('What an artist the world is losing'). Losing his nerve, he begged one of his companions to set an example by killing himself first. At last, the sound of approaching horsemen drove Nero to face the end. He committed suicide by stabbing himself in the throat with a dagger, with the help of Epaphroditus, his private secretary.

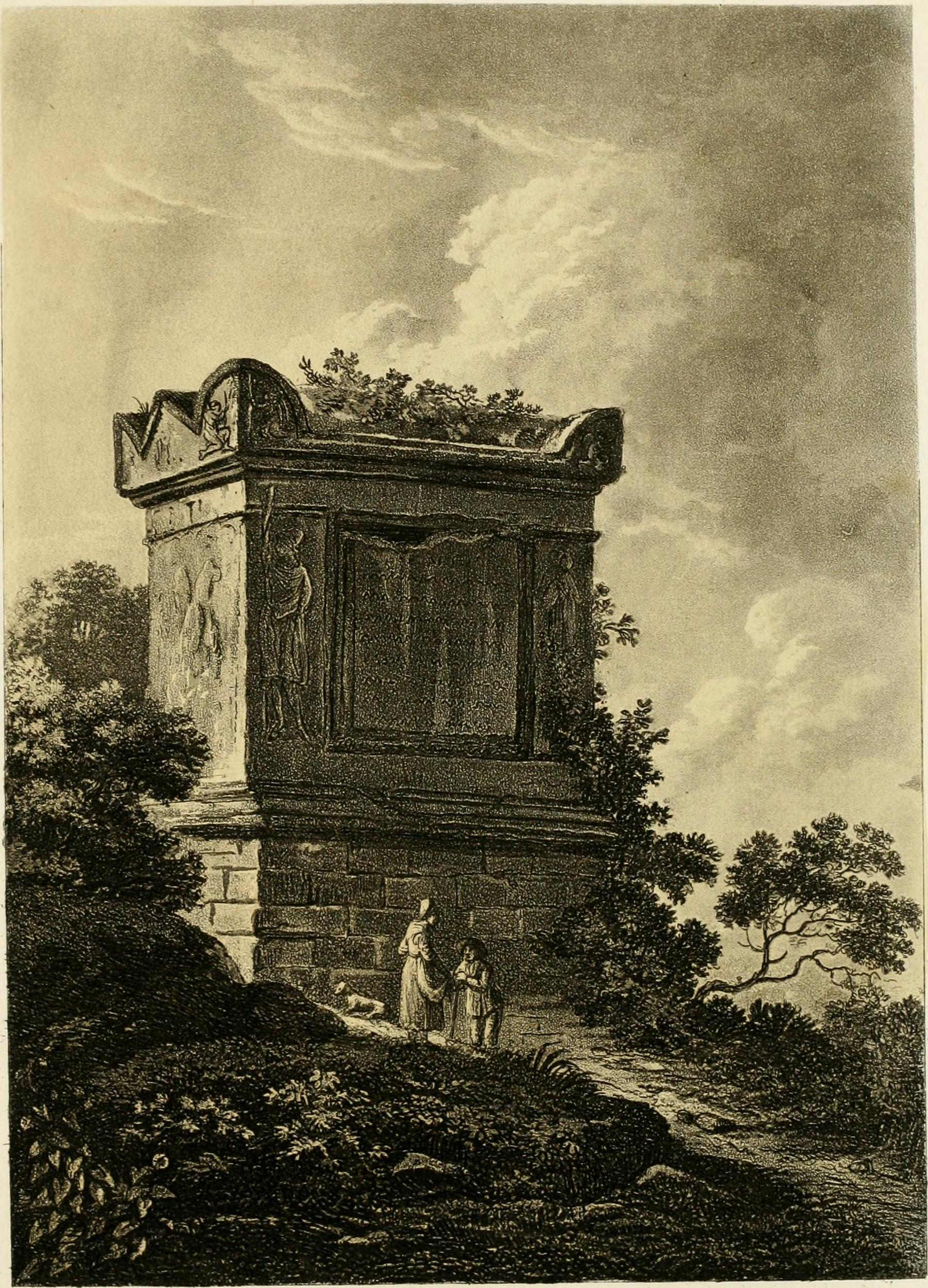
An 1815 illustration of the alleged tomb of Nero; actually tomb of proconsul Publius Vibius Marianus.

When one of the horsemen entered and saw that Nero was dying, he attempted to stop the bleeding, but efforts to save Nero's life were unsuccessful. Nero's final words were "Too late! This is fidelity!" He died on 9 June 68, (Note: Cassius Dio 66.4: "from the death of Nero to the beginning of Vespasian's rule a year and twenty-two days elapsed". Vespasian's reign officially began on 1 July (Suetonius, Vespasian 6), which places the death on 9 June. Furthermore, Epiphanius' On Weights and Measures (III) gives a reign length of "thirteen years and seven months and twenty-seven days". Jerome (2070) gives "13 years, 7 months and 28 days" (using inclusive counting).) the anniversary of the death of his first wife, Claudia Octavia, and was buried in the Mausoleum of the Domitii Ahenobarbi, in what is now the Villa Borghese (Pincian Hill) area of Rome. According to Sulpicius Severus, it is unclear whether Nero took his own life. The Mausoleum of the Domitii Ahenobarbi was destroyed by Pope Paschal II in the early 12th century and the ashes scattered in the Tiber because of a legend that the Antichrist would be a reconstructed Nero. The Church of Santa Maria del Popolo stands at the foot of the Pincian hill, while the actual mausoleum's location was somewhere higher up the slopes, visible from the Campus Martius. With Nero's death, the Julio-Claudian dynasty ended. Chaos ensued in the Year of the Four Emperors.

=== After Nero ===
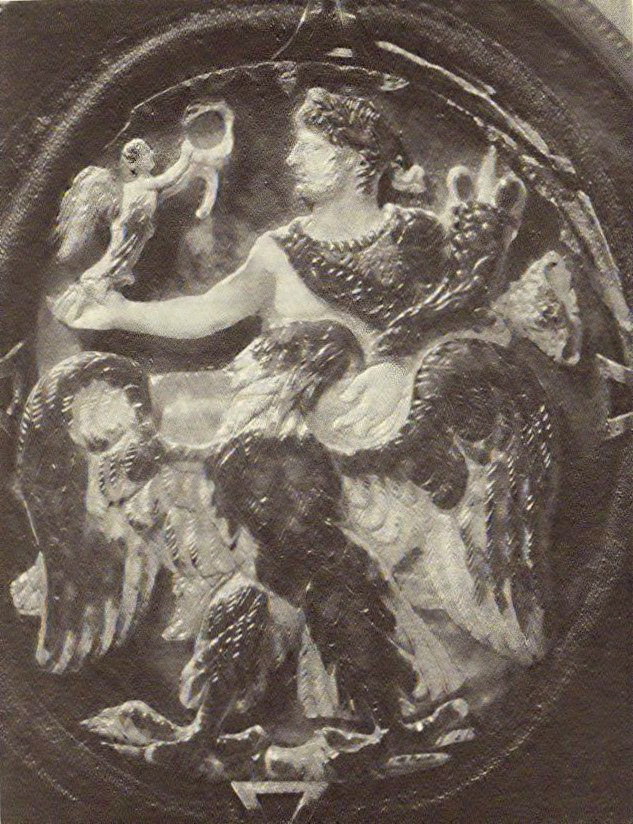
Apotheosis of Nero, c. after 68. Artwork portraying Nero rising to divine status after his death.

According to Suetonius and Cassius Dio, the people of Rome celebrated the death of Nero. Tacitus, though, describes a more complicated political environment. Tacitus mentions that Nero's death was welcomed by senators, nobility, and the upper class. The lower class, slaves, frequenters of the arena and the theater, and "those who were supported by the famous excesses of Nero", on the other hand, were upset with the news. Members of the military were said to have mixed feelings, as they had allegiance to Nero but had been bribed to overthrow him.

Eastern sources, namely Philostratus and Apollonius of Tyana, mention that Nero's death was mourned as he "restored the liberties of Hellas with a wisdom and moderation quite alien to his character", and that he "held our liberties in his hand and respected them". Modern scholarship generally holds that, while the Senate and more well-off individuals welcomed Nero's death, the general populace was "loyal to the end and beyond, for Otho and Vitellius both thought it worthwhile to appeal to their nostalgia".

Nero's name was erased from some monuments, in what Edward Champlin regards as an "outburst of private zeal". Many portraits of Nero were reworked to represent other figures; according to Eric R. Varner, over 50 such images survive. This reworking of images is often explained as part of the way in which the memory of disgraced emperors was condemned posthumously, a practice known as damnatio memoriae. Champlin doubts that the practice is necessarily negative and notes that some continued to create images of Nero long after his death. Damaged portraits of Nero, often with hammer blows directed to the face, have been found in many provinces of the Roman Empire, three recently having been identified from the United Kingdom.

The civil war during the Year of the Four Emperors was described by ancient historians as a troubling period. According to Tacitus, this instability was rooted in the fact that emperors could no longer rely on the perceived legitimacy of the imperial bloodline, as Nero and those before him could. Galba began his short reign with the execution of many of Nero's allies. One such notable enemy included Nymphidius Sabinus, who claimed to be the son of Emperor Caligula. Otho overthrew Galba. Otho was said to be liked by many soldiers because he had been a friend of Nero and resembled him somewhat in temperament. It was said that the common Roman hailed Otho as Nero himself. Otho used "Nero" as a surname and reerected many statues to Nero. Vitellius overthrew Otho. Vitellius began his reign with a large funeral for Nero complete with songs written by Nero.

After Nero's death in AD 68, there was a widespread belief, especially in the eastern provinces, that he was not dead and somehow would return. This belief came to be known as the Nero Redivivus legend. The legend of Nero's return lasted for hundreds of years after Nero's death. Augustine of Hippo wrote of the legend as a popular belief in AD 422. At least three Nero impostors emerged leading rebellions. The first, who sang and played the cithara or lyre, and whose face was similar to that of the dead emperor, appeared in AD 69 during the reign of Vitellius. After persuading some to recognize him, he was captured and executed. Sometime during the reign of Titus (79–81), another impostor appeared in Asia and sang to the accompaniment of the lyre and looked like Nero, but he, too, was killed. Twenty years after Nero's death, during the reign of Domitian, there was a third pretender. He was supported by the Parthians, who only reluctantly gave him up, and the matter almost came to war.

== Military conflicts ==
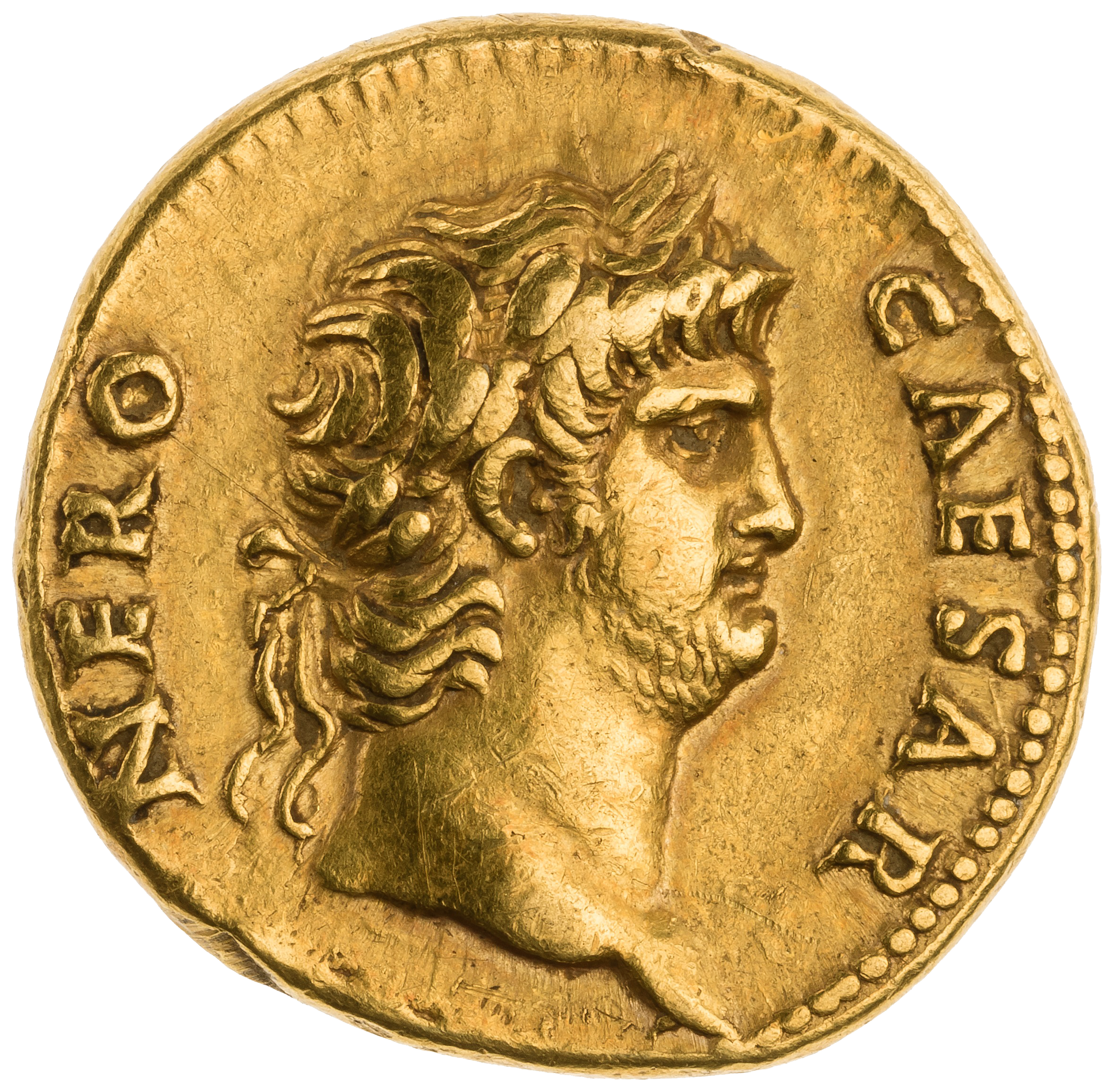
Aureus of Nero, c. AD 64

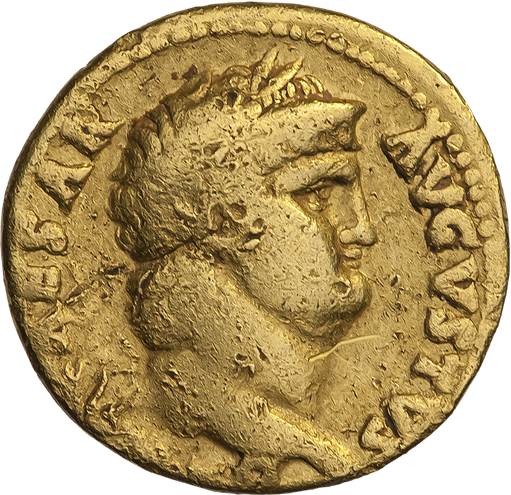
Aureus of Nero, c. AD 68

=== Boudica's uprising ===
In Britannia (Britain) in AD 59, Prasutagus, leader of the Iceni tribe and a client king of Rome during Claudius' reign, had died. The client state arrangement was unlikely to survive following the death of Claudius. The will of the Iceni tribal King Prasutagus, leaving control of the Iceni to his daughters, was denied. When the Roman procurator Catus Decianus scourged Prasutagus' wife Boudica and raped her daughters, the Iceni revolted. They were joined by the Celtic Trinovantes tribe and their uprising became the most significant provincial rebellion of the 1st century AD.

Under Queen Boudica, the towns of Camulodunum (Colchester), Londinium (London) and Verulamium (St. Albans) were burned, and a substantial body of Roman legion infantry were eliminated. The governor of the province, Gaius Suetonius Paulinus, assembled his remaining forces and defeated the Britons. Although order was restored for some time, Nero considered abandoning the province. Julius Classicianus replaced the former procurator, Catus Decianus, and Classicianus advised Nero to replace Paulinus who continued to punish the population even after the rebellion was over. Nero decided to adopt a more lenient approach by appointing a new governor, Petronius Turpilianus.

=== Peace with Parthia ===
Nero began preparing for war in the early years of his reign, after the Parthian king Vologeses set his brother Tiridates on the Armenian throne. Around AD 57 and AD 58 Domitius Corbulo and his legions advanced on Tiridates and captured the Armenian capital Artaxata. Tigranes was chosen to replace Tiridates on the Armenian throne. When Tigranes attacked Adiabene, Nero had to send further legions to defend Armenia and Syria from Parthia.

The Roman victory came at a time when the Parthians were troubled by revolts; when this was dealt with they were able to devote resources to the Armenian situation. A Roman army under Paetus surrendered under humiliating circumstances and though both Roman and Parthian forces withdrew from Armenia, it was under Parthian control. The triumphal arch for Corbulo's earlier victory was part-built when Parthian envoys arrived in AD 63 to discuss treaties. Given imperium over the eastern regions, Corbulo organised his forces for an invasion but was met by this Parthian delegation. An agreement was thereafter reached with the Parthians: Rome would recognize Tiridates as king of Armenia, only if he agreed to receive his diadem from Nero. A coronation ceremony was held in Italy AD 66. Dio reports that Tiridates said "I have come to you, my God, worshiping you as Mithras." Shotter says this parallels other divine designations that were commonly applied to Nero in the East including "The New Apollo" and "The New Sun". After the coronation, friendly relations were established between Rome and the eastern kingdoms of Parthia and Armenia. Artaxata was temporarily renamed Neroneia.

=== First Jewish War ===
In 66, there was a Jewish revolt in Judea stemming from Greek and Jewish religious tension. In 67, Nero dispatched Vespasian to restore order. This revolt was eventually put down in 70, after Nero's death. This revolt is famous for Romans breaching the walls of Jerusalem and destroying the Second Temple of Jerusalem.

== Pursuits ==
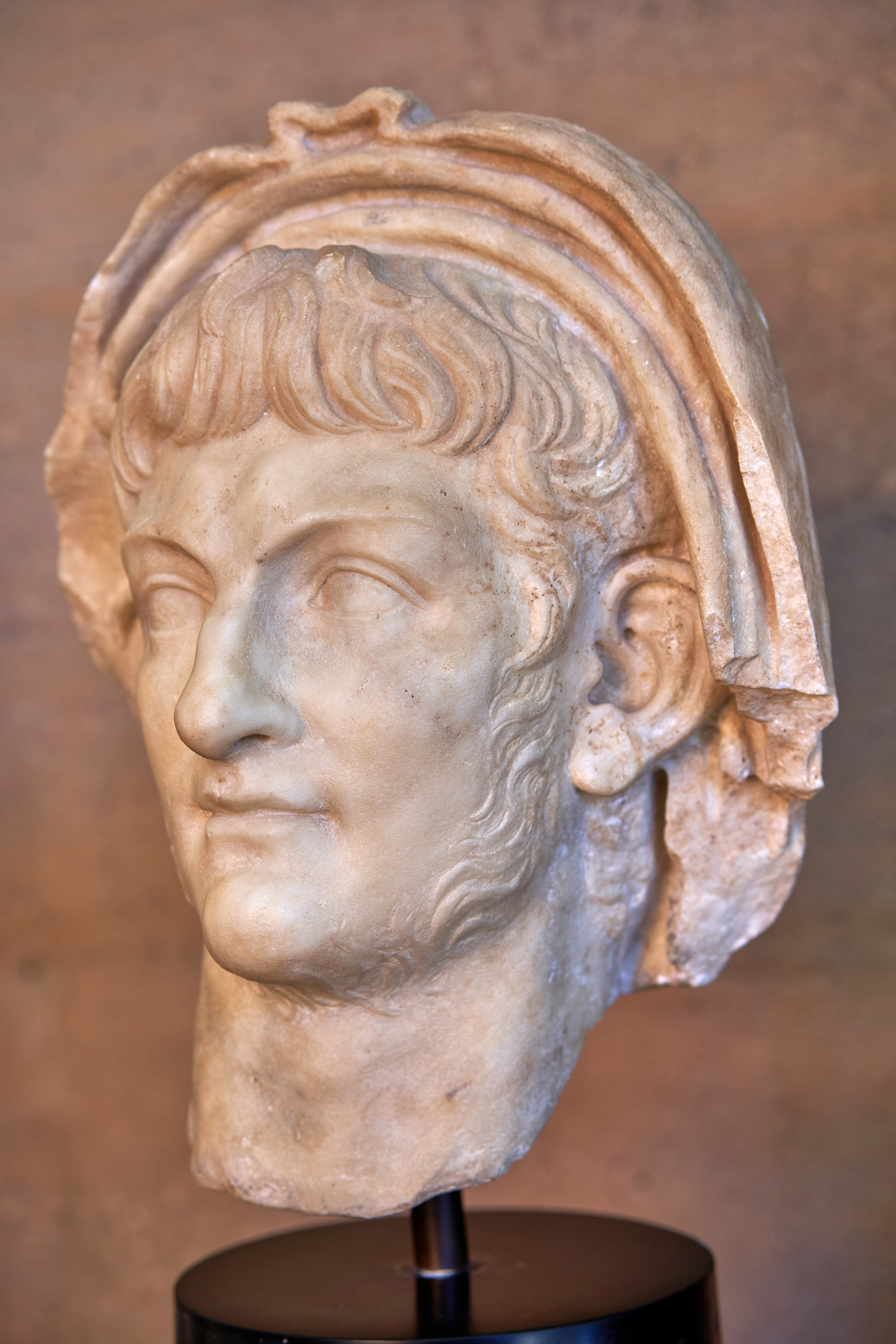
Bust of Nero, c. AD 60. Archaeological Museum of Ancient Corinth

Nero studied poetry, music, painting, and sculpture. He both sang and played the cithara (a type of lyre). Many of these disciplines were standard education for the Roman elite, but Nero's devotion to music exceeded what was socially acceptable for a Roman of his class. Ancient sources were critical of Nero's emphasis on the arts, chariot-racing and athletics. Pliny described Nero as an "actor-emperor" (scaenici imperatoris) and Suetonius wrote that he was "carried away by a craze for popularity...since he was acclaimed as the equal of Apollo in music and of the Sun in driving a chariot, he had planned to emulate the exploits of Hercules as well."

In AD 67 Nero participated in the Olympics. He had bribed organizers to postpone the games for a year so he could participate, and artistic competitions were added to the athletic events. Nero won every contest in which he was a competitor. During the games Nero sang and played his lyre on stage, acted in tragedies and raced chariots. He won a 10-horse chariot race, despite being thrown from the chariot and leaving the race. He was crowned on the basis that he would have won if he had completed the race. After he died a year later, his name was removed from the list of winners. Champlin writes that though Nero's participation "effectively stifled true competition, [Nero] seems to have been oblivious of reality." Nero established the Neronian games in AD 60. Modeled on Greek style games, these games included musical, gymnastic, and equestrian contests. According to Suetonius the gymnastic contests were held in the Saepta area of the Campus Martius.

== Historiography ==
The history of Nero's reign is problematic in that no historical sources survived that were contemporary with Nero. These first histories, while they still existed, were described as biased and fantastical, either overly critical or praising of Nero. The original sources were also said to contradict on a number of events. Nonetheless, these lost primary sources were the basis of surviving secondary and tertiary histories on Nero written by the next generations of historians. A few of the contemporary historians are known by name. Fabius Rusticus, Cluvius Rufus and Pliny the Elder all wrote condemning histories on Nero that are now lost. There were also pro-Nero histories, but it is unknown who wrote them or for what deeds Nero was praised.

The bulk of what is known of Nero comes from Tacitus, Suetonius, and Cassius Dio, who were all of the upper classes. Tacitus and Suetonius wrote their histories on Nero over 50 years after his death, while Cassius Dio wrote his history over 150 years after Nero's death. These sources contradict one another on a number of events in Nero's life, including the death of Claudius, the death of Agrippina, and the Roman fire of AD 64, but they are consistent in their condemnation of Nero.

Cassius Dio

Cassius Dio (c. 155–229) was the son of Cassius Apronianus, a Roman senator. He passed the greater part of his life in public service. He was a senator under Commodus and governor of Smyrna after the death of Septimius Severus; and afterwards suffect consul around 205, and also proconsul in Africa and Pannonia. Books 61–63 of Dio's Roman History describe the reign of Nero. Only fragments of these books remain and what does remain was abridged and altered by John Xiphilinus, an 11th-century monk.

Dio Chrysostom

Dio Chrysostom (c. 40–120), a Greek philosopher and historian, wrote the Roman people were very happy with Nero and would have allowed him to rule indefinitely. They longed for his rule once he was gone and embraced imposters when they appeared:

Indeed the truth about this has not come out even yet; for so far as the rest of his subjects were concerned, there was nothing to prevent his continuing to be Emperor for all time, seeing that even now everybody wishes he were still alive. And the great majority do believe that he still is, although in a certain sense he has died not once but often along with those who had been firmly convinced that he was still alive.

Epictetus

Epictetus (c. 55–135) was the slave to Nero's scribe Epaphroditos. He makes a few passing negative comments on Nero's character in his work, but makes no remarks on the nature of his rule. He describes Nero as a spoiled, angry and unhappy man.

Josephus

The historian Josephus (c. 37–100), while calling Nero a tyrant, was also the first to mention bias against Nero. Of other historians, he said:

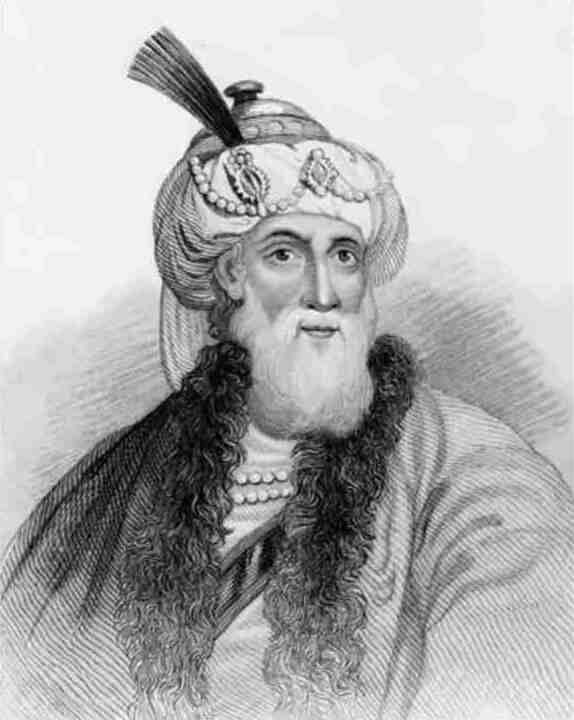
A circa 18th-century woodcut of the historian Josephus (c. 37–100), who accused other historians of slandering Nero.

But I omit any further discourse about these affairs; for there have been a great many who have composed the history of Nero; some of which have departed from the truth of facts out of favour, as having received benefits from him; while others, out of hatred to him, and the great ill-will which they bore him, have so impudently raved against him with their lies, that they justly deserve to be condemned. Nor do I wonder at such as have told lies of Nero, since they have not in their writings preserved the truth of history as to those facts that were earlier than his time, even when the actors could have no way incurred their hatred, since those writers lived a long time after them.

Lucan

Although more of a poet than a historian, Lucan (c. 39–65) has one of the kindest accounts of Nero's rule. He writes of peace and prosperity under Nero, in contrast to previous war and strife. Ironically, he was later involved in a conspiracy to overthrow Nero and was executed.

Philostratus

Philostratus II, "the Athenian" (c. 172–250), spoke of Nero in the Life of Apollonius of Tyana (Books 4–5). Although he has a generally bad or dim view of Nero, he speaks of others' positive reception of Nero in the East.

Pliny the Elder

The history of Nero by Pliny the Elder (c. 24–79) did not survive. Still, there are several references to Nero in Pliny's Natural Histories. Pliny has one of the worst opinions of Nero and calls him an "enemy of mankind".

Plutarch

Plutarch (c. 46–127) mentions Nero indirectly in his account of the Life of Galba and the Life of Otho, as well as in the Vision of Thespesius in Book 7 of the Moralia, where a voice orders that Nero's soul be transferred to a more offensive species. Nero is portrayed as a tyrant, but those that replace him are not described as better.

Seneca the Younger

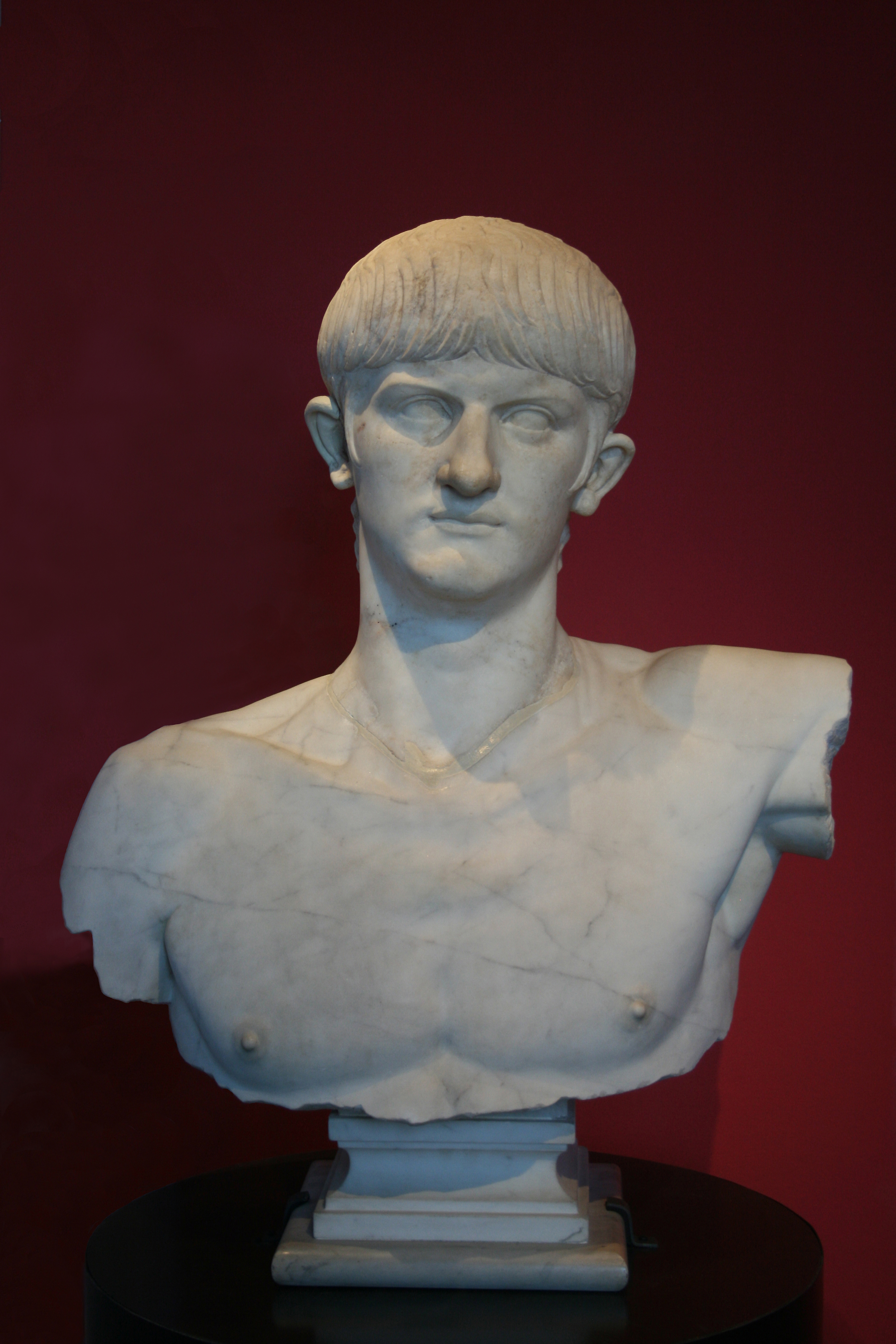
Bust of Nero c. AD 54/55-59

Seneca (c. 4 BC – AD 65), Nero's teacher and advisor, writes very positively of Nero.

Suetonius

Suetonius (c. 69–130) was a member of the equestrian order, and he was the head of the department of the imperial correspondence. While in this position, Suetonius started writing biographies of the emperors, accentuating the anecdotal and sensational aspects. By this account, Nero raped the vestal virgin Rubria.

Tacitus

The Annals by Tacitus (c. 56–117) is the most detailed and comprehensive history on the rule of Nero, despite being incomplete after the year AD 66. Tacitus described the rule of the Julio-Claudian emperors as generally unjust. He also thought that existing writing on them was unbalanced:

The histories of Tiberius, Caius, Claudius and Nero, while they were in power, were falsified through terror, and after their death were written under the irritation of a recent hatred.

Tacitus was the son of a procurator, who married into the elite family of Agricola. He entered his political life as a senator after Nero's death and, by Tacitus' own admission, owed much to Nero's rivals. Realising that this bias may be apparent to others, Tacitus protests that his writing is true.

Girolamo Cardano

In 1562, Girolamo Cardano published in Basel his Encomium Neronis, which was one of the first historical references of the modern era to portray Nero in a positive light.

== In Jewish and Christian tradition ==
=== Jewish tradition ===
An aggadah in the Talmud relates that at the end of year 66, a conflict broke out between Greeks and Jews in Jerusalem and Caesarea Maritima. During the Great Jewish Revolt, as related in tractate Gittin 56a:7, Nero went to Jerusalem and shot arrows in all four directions; all the arrows landed in the city. He then asked a passing child to repeat the Tanakh verse he had learned that day. The child responded, "I will lay my vengeance upon Edom by the hand of my people Israel" (Ezekiel 25:14). Upon hearing this, Nero became terrified: he believed that God wanted the Second Temple to be destroyed, but that he would punish the one to carry out its destruction. Nero said, "He desires to lay waste His House and to lay the blame on me", so he fled, converted to Judaism to escape retribution, and sent Vespasian to quell the revolt. The Talmud adds that the sage Rabbi Meir, who lived during Mishnah's collation and was a prominent supporter of Bar Kokhba's revolt against Roman rule, was a descendant of Nero. Rabbi Meir was considered one of the greatest of the Tannaim of the third generation (139–163).

The Talmudic stories about Nero's conversion and Rabbi Meir being of his descendant met various reactions by later Jewish scholars. Azariah de Rossi and Rabbi David Gans suggest that Nero may have converted secretly, explaining the absence of historical records. The Maharal takes the Talmudic narrative at face value, interpreting it as a reflection of Nero's moral character rather than a literal historical account. Modern scholars view the story as a rabbinic motif linking a non-Jewish figure to a Jewish sage; others, including Rabbi Zvi Ron, allegorize it as a lesson about the consequences of refusing to mediate conflict. Contemporary Roman and Greek sources do not support the Talmudic legend about Nero's alleged trip to Jerusalem or conversion to Judaism. There is also no record of Nero having any offspring who survived infancy: his only recorded child, Claudia Augusta, died aged 4 months.

=== Christian tradition ===
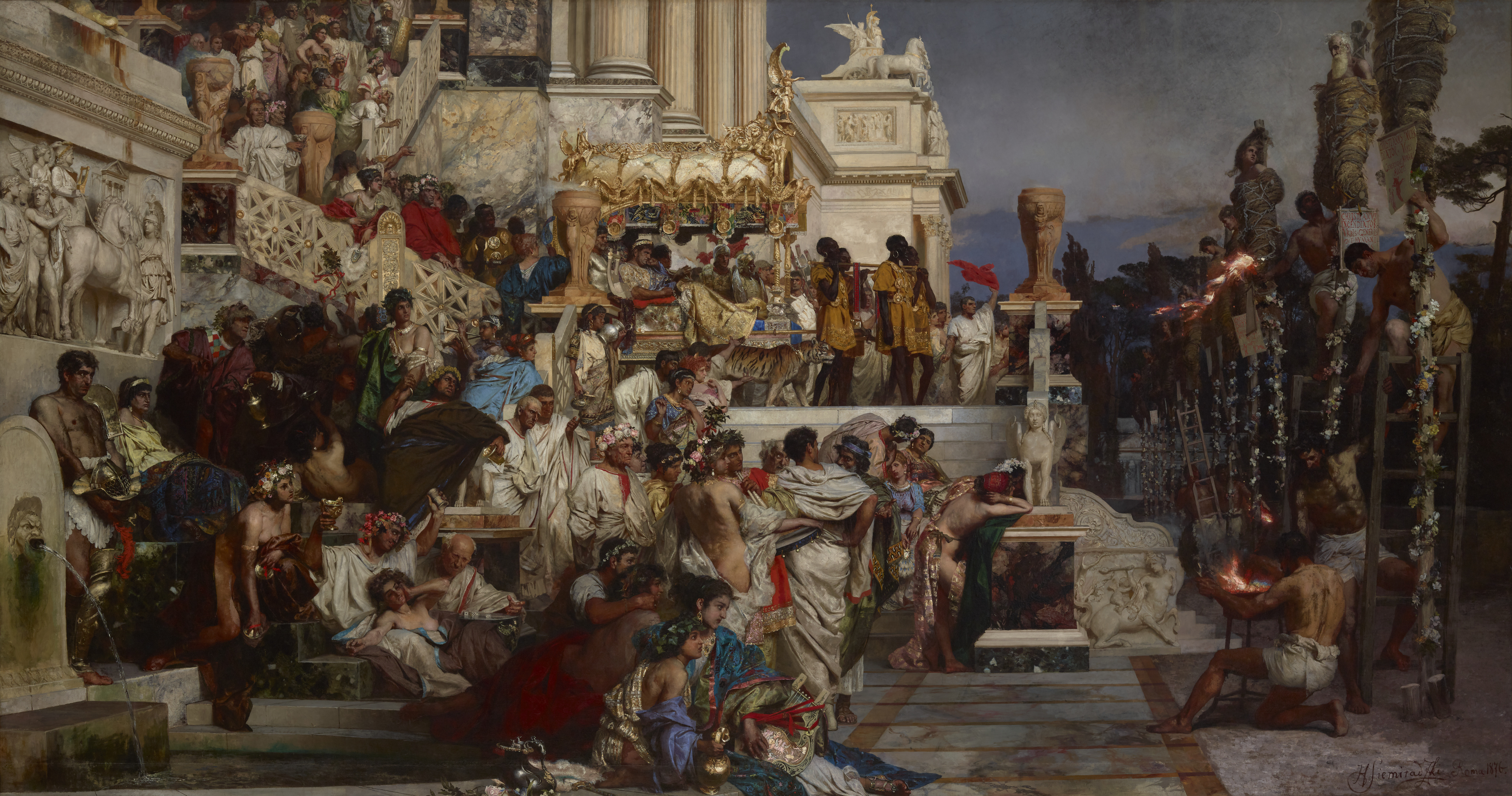
Nero's Torches, by Henryk Siemiradzki

Tacitus details Nero's extensive torture and execution of Christians after the Great Fire of Rome in 64, while Suetonius mentions Nero punishing Christians for their "new and mischievous superstition", without linking it to the fire. Christian theologian Tertullian (c. 155–230) was the first to call Nero the first persecutor of Christians, writing "Examine your records. There you will find that Nero was the first that persecuted this doctrine." Lactantius (c. 240–320) also said that Nero "first persecuted the servants of God" (i.e., Christians, in this case), as did Sulpicius Severus. However, Suetonius writes that, "since the Jews constantly made disturbances at the instigation of Chrestus, the [emperor Claudius] expelled them from Rome" ("Iudaeos impulsore Chresto assidue tumultuantis Roma expulit"). These expelled "Jews" may have, in fact, been early Christians, although Suetonius is not explicit in either direction. In his mention of Priscilla and Aquila, the author of the Christian book of Acts includes the couple among the "Jews" affected by Claudius' expulsion of Jews from Rome (Acts 18:2).

==== Martyrdoms of Peter and Paul ====
The earliest evidence suggesting that Nero ordered the execution of an apostle is found in the First Epistle of Clement, which was sent to the Christian community in Corinth and is traditionally dated c. AD 96. The apocryphal Ascension of Isaiah, a Christian text from the 2nd century, relates, "the slayer of his mother, who himself (even) this king, will persecute the plant which the Twelve Apostles of the Beloved have planted. Of the Twelve one will be delivered into his hands"—this is interpreted as referring to Nero.

Bishop Eusebius of Caesarea (c. 275–339) was the first to report that Paul the Apostle was beheaded and Peter was crucified in Rome during the reign of Nero. He claims Nero's persecution resulted in the deaths of Peter and Paul, but without specific orders. However, first-century accounts suggest Paul survived his two years in Rome, traveled to Hispania, and was tried again in Rome before his death. Peter is said to have been crucified upside-down in Rome during Nero's reign in the apocryphal Acts of Peter (c. 200). The account ends with Paul still alive and Nero abiding by God's command not to persecute Christians any longer. By the fourth century, a number of writers were stating that Nero killed Peter and Paul.

==== Antichrist ====
The Sibylline Oracles (books 5 and 8), written in the second century, speak of Nero returning and bringing destruction. Within Christian communities, these writings, along with others, fueled the belief that Nero would be resurrected as the Antichrist. In 310, Lactantius wrote that Nero "suddenly disappeared, and even the burial place of that noxious wild beast was nowhere to be seen. This has led some persons of extravagant imagination to suppose that, having been conveyed to a distant region, he is still reserved alive; and to him they apply the Sibylline verses." Lactantius maintains that it is not right to believe this.

In 422, Augustine of Hippo, referring to 2 Thessalonians 2:1–11, stated that he believed that Paul mentioned the coming of the Antichrist. Although he rejects the view, Augustine mentions that many Christians believed Nero was or would return as the Antichrist. He wrote that, "in saying, 'For the mystery of iniquity doth already work,' he alluded to Nero, whose deeds already seemed to be as the deeds of Antichrist."

Some modern Christian biblical scholars, such as Delbert Hillers (Johns Hopkins University) of the American Schools of Oriental Research and the editors of the Oxford Study Bible and HarperCollins Study Bible, contend that the number of the beast in the Book of Revelation is a code for Nero, a view that is also supported in Roman Catholic biblical commentaries. The claim is in regard to the "Babylon" mentioned in Revelation 17:1–18, which, according to Scott G. Sinclair, in the period of the book's authorship, referred to Rome (e.g., 1 Peter 5:13).

== See also ==
- List of Roman emperors
- Roman pharaoh

Nero Julio-Claudian dynasty Born: 15 December 37 Died: 9 June 68
Political offices
Preceded by Claudius	Roman emperor 54–68	Succeeded by Galba
Preceded by M. Aefulanus, and ignotus as suffect consuls	Roman consul 55 with L. Antistius Vetus	Succeeded by Numerius Cestius as suffect consul
Preceded by L. Duvius Avitus, and P. Clodius Thrasea Paetus as suffect consuls	Roman consul 57–58 with L. Calpurnius Piso (57); M. Valerius Messalla Corvinus (58)	Succeeded by C. Fonteius Agrippa as suffect consul
Preceded by T. Sextius Africanus, and M. Ostorius Scapula as suffect consuls	Roman consul 60 with Cossus Cornelius Lentulus	Succeeded by C. Velleius Paterculus, and M. Manilius Vopiscus as suffect consuls
Preceded by Ti. Catius Asconius Silius Italicus, and P. Galerius Trachalus as ordinary consuls	Roman consul 68 (suffect) sine collega	Succeeded by C. Bellicius Natalis, and P. Cornelius Scipio Asiaticus as suffect consuls
