= Epaphroditus (freedman of Nero) =

1st-century Roman freedman and secretary to Emperor Nero

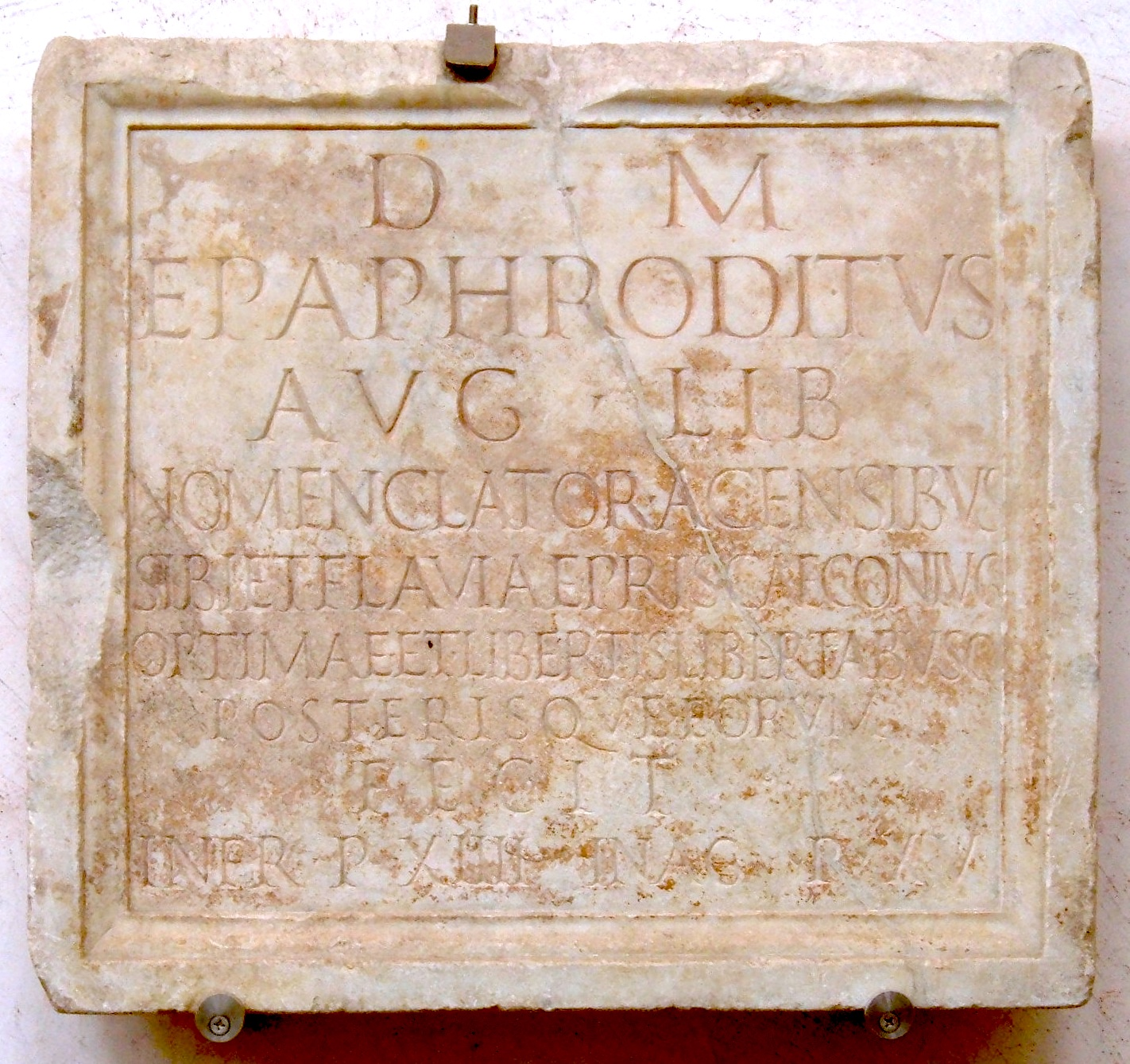
Funerary inscription for Epaphroditos, Museo Epigrafico, Rome

Epaphroditus (Greek: Ἐπαφρόδιτος; born c. 20–25 – died c. 95), was a freedman and secretary of the Roman Emperor Nero. He was later executed by Domitian for failing to prevent Nero's suicide.

== Name ==
His name originates from the Greek language and means "lovely, charming" combined with the name Aphrodite. This is preceded by the Greek preposition 'ep' which simply means 'for' thus indicating that this man was named with the intention of his life being dedicated to or for the Greek goddess Aphrodite. The Romans often gave slaves of Greek origins illustrious names from Greek mythology and culture, for example Claudius's freedman Narcissus, Nero's freedman Polyclitus and Antonia Minor's freedwoman Caenis.

== Life ==
It is not known for certain who Epaphroditus' master was, but it is likely that he was freed by the Emperor Claudius (41–54). Because freedmen received the praenomen and the gentilicium of their former master, but retained their original name as cognomen, the official name of Epaphroditus would have probably been Tiberius Claudius Epaphroditus, to which Augusti libertus ("freedman of the emperor") could be added, if he was indeed emancipated by Claudius.

Epaphroditus was an imperial freedman and secretary (a libellis), which means that he drafted the Emperor Nero's replies to petitions. He is mentioned as apparitor Caesarum, which means that he was some sort of servant of the imperial family, but his specific duties are not mentioned. (Note: Epaphroditus was called a viator tribunicius, hence he must have served someone with the powers of a Tribune, and at that time that could only have been the Emperor.)

According to Tacitus, Epaphroditus learned in 65 AD that a group led by the senator Gaius Calpurnius Piso had organized a coup. Epaphroditus immediately reported it to the Emperor and Piso and his fellow conspirators were arrested. After the conspirators had been executed Epaphroditus received military honours. He was now a wealthy man and owned the Horti Epaphroditiani, large villa-gardens on the Esquiline Hill, east of the Domus Aurea ("Golden House"), which Nero had started to construct after the Great Fire of Rome in 64 AD.

During the later conspiracy which did put an end to Nero's rule, Epaphroditus accompanied his master in his flight. When Nero attempted to kill himself (9 June 68 AD), Epaphroditus assisted him.

For rendering this assistance to Nero, however, Epaphroditus had afterwards to pay with his own life: Domitian first banished and afterwards ordered Epaphroditus to be put to death (c. 95 AD), because he had not exerted himself to save the life of Nero. It is likely that this execution is one of the main reasons that, about a year later, Domitian was assassinated by court officials.

Epaphroditus was the owner of Epictetus of Hierapolis, a Stoic philosopher taught by Musonius Rufus.

The man named Epaphroditus to whom Josephus dedicated his Antiquities of the Jews was most likely someone else by the same name, who may have been a freedman of Emperor Trajan; (Note: "It is generally believed that Josephus is speaking of one 'Epaphroditus' who lived in the reign of Trajan, and was a freedman and procurator" of Emperor Trajan.) it is disputed whether he may have been the same Epaphroditus mentioned by St. Paul in the New Testament Epistle to the Philippians. (Note: At the very least these involved Paul's own close associate 'Epaphroditus', by whom he "sends greetings" ... "especially to those in Caesar's household". (Phil. 2:25 and 4:18) "It would be difficult to conceive that this Epaphroditus could be anyone other than Nero's own secretary by that name, later blamed by Domitian for killing or (at least) helping Nero to kill himself.") (Note: "From all these persons of the name of Epaphroditus, we must distinguish the one whom the Apostle Paul mentions as his companion.")
